= François de Lorraine, Grand Prior =

French noble and soldier

François de Lorraine
- Grand prieuré de France
- Born: 18 April 1534; Joinville
- Died: 6 March 1563 (aged 28); Provence
- Noble family: House of Guise
- Father: Claude, Duke of Guise
- Mother: Antoinette de Bourbon-Vendôme

François de Lorraine, Grand Prieur de France de l'Ordre de Malte (18 April 1534 Joinville-6 March 1563) was a French noble and soldier, who fought during the latter Italian Wars. Second youngest of the sons of Claude, Duke of Guise and Antoinette de Bourbon, the Grand Prior was selected for a life with the Order of Malta. In 1549 King Henri II appointed him Grand Prior of the Order in France, giving him access to the revenues of 'commanderies.' He fought with the king in the final years of the Italian Wars, serving in Italy in 1551 and Alsace the following year at the famous defence of Metz. He and his brother Elbeuf played a key role in the capture of Corse in 1553, defending the island against attempted counter attacks by the Genoese.

In 1558 he became 'general of the galleys', providing for him a leading role in the planned combined naval campaign of that year with the Ottoman Empire. However, the Ottoman admiral ignored the plan, raiding his way into the western Mediterranean, before forming a compact with the Genoese in return for a large bribe. Thus the campaign could not proceed. In 1559 with the death of Henri II, the Grand Prior was made a chevalier de l'Ordre de Saint-Michel, the highest honour of the time. His role as general of the galleys would be key for the planned Guise expedition to Scotland in the following spring. However, difficulty with his subordinates, government finance issues, and internal instability brought about by the Conspiracy of Amboise would lead to peace being declared in June 1560 with England, cancelling the expedition while the Grand Priors fleet was still travelling up France's west coast. The following year he assisted his niece's entry into Scotland as the new queen. During 1562 he partook in the meeting at Saverne during which the Guise family floated the idea of converting to Lutheranism to restore church unity. He died in March 1563, several days after the assassination of his brother, a heavy blow to his family.

== Early life and family ==
François de Lorraine was born in 1534, the fifth son of Claude, Duke of Guise and Antoinette de Bourbon.

Despite becoming Grand Prior, the dispensation from the Pope allowing him to hold the office without joining a Holy Order meant that it was theoretically possible for him to marry. As such the Guise family floated the possibility of arranging a marriage between him and the heiress Marie de Bourbon, duchesse d'Estouteville. However before discussions could lead to anything definite, the Grand Prior had died thus a marriage was arranged between Marie and the duke of Longueville instead.

== Reign of Henri II ==
=== Grand Prior ===
While custom dictated that he not take his vows for the Order until he was 21, which would have been in 1555, his family were keen to get him moving and he became in March 1549 Grand Prior of France for the Order of Saint John of Jerusalem, Rhodes and Malta after being appointed to the position by Henri II, he would take an oath for the order in June 1549. The previous year his brother Cardinal Guise had been in Rome, campaigning for the Pope to allow for his young brother to become Grand Prior. After several months of effort, the Pope gave his assent. He began building his ecclesiastical empire receiving an income of 5250 livres from commanderies owned by knights in Troyes. In total he received 12,000 livres income from commanderies across France. His brother Charles, Cardinal of Lorraine interceded with the Pope to secure dispensation for him to take the appointment without the need to join a Holy Order. Regardless his ecclesiastical career meant that on the death of his father in 1550, the inheritance would only be divided between three sons. With the death of Claude in April, it was decided that though the body would be put in a lead lined coffin, the burial would be left until June, as time was needed for Lorraine, Cardinal Guise and the Grand Prior to hurry home from Rome where they had recently observed the election of a new Pope which had taken place in February.

=== Italian wars ===
==== 1551-1552 Campaign ====
With the resumption of the Italian Wars in 1551, the Grand Prior and Elbeuf provided support to their brother Aumale's command of the cavalry under the overall authority of Marshal Brissac. Together they would support Marshal Brissac's victory at the siege of Chieri. This would be the total of the campaign before the proxy war of the year expanded into full war between the France and the Empire the following year. In 1552 Henri eyed an opportunity to effect a major coup in Alsace with the seizure of the Three Bishoprics. To this end Guise entered the city of Metz that year at invitation, securing the valuable city for France. Emperor Charles V was not about to allow such an acquisition to go uncontested and prepared to invest the city. Elbeuf and the Grand Prior hurried into the city, alongside much of the flower of the French nobility for the opportunity of glory that a successful defence presented. They would be successful in pushing back Charles V from the city, and his broken army retreated east. During the siege however, Aumale was captured, and would spend the next several years in captivity.

==== 1553-1554 Campaign ====
During the campaign season of 1553, the French and Ottomans combined their attentions for the island of Corse. Together under the authority of Paul de Thermes they succeeded in capturing the main cities of the island. Elbeuf and the Grand Prior were dispatched to offer their assistance for the campaign in late 1553, and to help rebuff any counter offensive by the Genoese Admiral Andrea Doria. The campaign against Corse would be the solitary French success in a difficult year for the French war effort.

In 1554, Henri was determined to launch a campaign through Picardie, to punish the Emperor for the destruction of Thérouanne that he had wrought in 1553. To this end an army of 50,000 men was assembled under the overall authority of Anne de Montmorency. The duke of Guise, Aumale, recently released from captivity, Elbeuf and the Grand Prior would join him on this campaign, among many other leading nobles. During the campaign Guise would achieve the stunning success of the Battle of Renty.

==== Crisis of Saint-Quentin ====
After the disaster at the battle of Saint-Quentin in which the Constable was captured and the French army destroyed, Guise who was campaigning in Italy was urgently called back to France to assume military command. While he hurried back ahead of his army, the Grand Prior and baron de La Garde, facilitated the transport of his troops. In 1558, the Grand Prior received a new office, that of general of the galleys, giving him military authority over the naval forces in the Mediterranean, this was at the expense of the baron de la Garde, who was hoping for the appointment. At this time France and the Ottoman Empire were in accord against their shared foe of the Emperor. To this end it was agreed between Henri and the Sultan for there to be a joint naval campaign in the spring and summer of that year, to coincide with the invasion of Italy. A large fleet of 111 galleys set sail from Konstantiniyye under the command of Piyale Paşa and made their way to Italy. However, while the Grand Prior, commander of the French galley's sat waiting in Provence, the fleet decided to take a detour, pillaging the coast of Naples in June, before burning down Ciutadella de Menorca on 12 July. Increasingly frustrated, the Grand Prior requested his presence in Toulon immediately. Piyale obliged the request, entering the port, however it became clear when a Genoese frigate entered the harbour on 24 July to offer Piyale many gifts, that the Ottomans had been bought off from attacking the Ligurian coast and Corse. With the plan of the campaign in ruins, Piyale decided to return home with his fleet, happy that the Ottomans at least, had not walked away empty handed. The Grand Prior meanwhile was left with an empty campaign. Meanwhile on land Marshal Brissac was able to achieve little.

== Reign of François II ==
=== Scottish plans ===
With the death of Henri in 1559, Jacques de la Brosse secured his own ordinance company under the kings successor François II of France. The Grand Prior served as his lieutenant in this company. That same year, with the Guise now ascendent in government, the honour of becoming a chevalier de l'ordre de Saint-Michel was bestowed upon the Grand Prior. The following year, the Guise government planned a campaign to Scotland to secure their sister Marie de Guise in her position in the country. While much of the preparations were happening in Normandie, the Grand Prior had overall responsibility for the Mediterranean fleet which was to play a role. He had difficulty with his subordinates, such as François de Coligny d'Andelot, who refused to embark with his men, little desiring to campaign in Scotland, leading many other captains to follow his example. Further some of his ships were requisitioned by the Flotte du Ponant which required them for other purposes. Finally by Spring 1560 the Grand Prior was on his way with the fleet, however his fleet was still travelling up the western seaboard of France when peace was concluded in June 1560. Castelnau alleges that they stopped en route for a considerable time in Portugal where they were entertained by the young Sebastião I.

== Reign of Charles IX ==
=== Mary, Queen of Scotland ===
On 15 August 1561, the new queen of Scotland departed France, travelling by boat with her uncles Aumale, Elbeuf and the Grand Prior. She established herself in her new country shortly thereafter, with some difficulty arriving at Leith due to the opposition of Elizabeth I.

=== Saverne ===
The grand prior travelled with his brothers Guise, Lorraine and Cardinal Guise, for their rendezvous with the Duke of Württemberg in February 1562 at Saverne. The topic of the meeting was matters of faith. The Guise presented themselves as being amenable to adopting Lutheranism, as a means of reuniting the French church. The religion was a far more agreeable compromise to the family than the Calvinism which dominated the French Protestant movement. The meeting ended positively, however all good will was shattered several weeks later when, while returning to the capital, the duke of Guise's men committed a massacre of Protestant worshippers at Wassy.

=== Death ===
A couple of weeks after the assassination of the Duke of Guise, the tragedy was compounded for the family by the natural death of the Grand Prior on 6 March. The Grand Prior had been considered by much of the family one of its most capable members and the dual blow overwhelmed Lorraine who was 'carried away with grief'.

== Sources ==
- Baumgartner, Frederic (1988). Henry II: King of France 1547-1559. Duke University Press.
- Carroll, Stuart (2005). Noble Power during the French Wars of Religion: The Guise Affinity and the Catholic Cause in Normandy. Cambridge University Press.
- Carroll, Stuart (2009). Martyrs and Murderers: The Guise Family and the Making of Europe. Oxford University Press.
- Cloulas, Ivan (1985). Henri II. Fayard.
- Durot, Éric (2012). François de Lorraine, duc de Guise entre Dieu et le Roi. Classiques Garnier.
- Wellman, Kathleen (2013). Queens and Mistresses of Renaissance France. Yale University Press.
