= Cardinal of Guise =

Cardinal of Guise can refer to these members of the French ducal family de Guise who became cardinals:

- Louis I, Cardinal of Guise (1527–1578), Bishop of Troyes
- Louis II, Cardinal of Guise, (1555–1588), nephew of Louis I
- Louis III, Cardinal of Guise, (1575–1621), the third son of Henry I, Duke of Guise, and Catherine of Cleves

== See also ==
- Cardinal of Lorraine (disambiguation)
