= Antoinette of Bourbon =

Duchess of Guise (1494–1583)

Antoinette de Bourbon
- Duchess of Guise
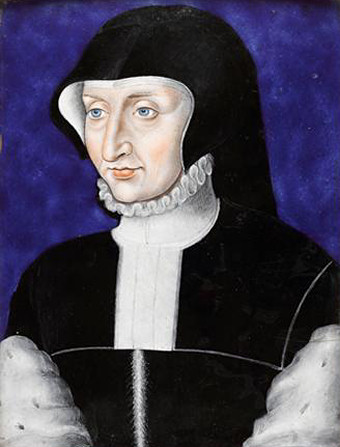
- Portrait by Leonard Limousin
- Born: 25 December 1494; Chateau de Ham, Somme department, Picardy, France
- Died: 22 January 1583 (aged 88); Chateau de Joinville
- Spouse: Claude, Duke of Guise (m. 1513; died 1550)
- Issue: Mary, Queen of Scotland; Francis, Duke of Guise; Renée, Abbess of St. Pierre; Charles, Archbishop of Reims; Claude, Duke of Aumale; Louis I, Cardinal of Guise; Antoinette, Abbess of Faremoutier; François, Grand Prior of the Order of Malta; René, Marquis of Elbeuf
- House: Bourbon
- Father: Francis, Count of Vendôme
- Mother: Marie I, Countess of Saint-Pol

Antoinette of Bourbon, Duchess of Guise (25 December 1494 – 22 January 1583), was a French noblewoman of the House of Bourbon. She was the wife of Claude, Duke of Guise.

== Life ==
Antoinette of Bourbon was born on 25 December 1494 at the Chateau de Ham, in the Somme department, Picardy, France. She was the child of Francis, Count of Vendôme and Marie I, Countess of Saint-Pol. Her paternal grandparents were John VIII, Count of Vendôme and Isabelle de Beauvau, and her maternal grandparents were Peter II, Count of Saint-Pol, and Margaret of Savoy.

Antoinette was described as having been a remarkable woman, combining a strong sense of family pride with a wry sense of humour. She exhibited considerable administrative talent at domestic economy as well as in the running of the vast Guise dominions surrounding their chateau of Joinville.

Antoinette exerted a powerful influence on the childhood of her granddaughter Mary, Queen of Scots, during the latter's thirteen-year sojourn in France, and was one of her principal advisors. Antoinette acted as proxy for her daughter, Mary of Guise, during the betrothal ceremony of the Queen of Scots and the Dauphin Francis on 19 April 1558.

Antoinette and her family have been described as "ultra-Catholic"; in 1533 Antoinette oversaw the burning of a Protestant man caught preaching in the town of Wassy. Her son Francis, Duke of Guise was held to be responsible for the anti-Protestant Massacre of Wassy on 1 March 1562 which was one of the early atrocities in the French Wars of Religion.

Antoinette of Bourbon died on 22 January 1583 at the Chateau de Joinville. She was eighty-eight years of age, having outlived all of her children except her daughter Renée, Abbess of the Abbey of Saint-Pierre-les-Dames, Rheims.

== Issue ==
Antoinette married Claude of Lorraine on 9 June 1513; they had:

- Mary of Guise (1515–1560); married first Louis II, Duke of Longueville; secondly King James V of Scotland in 1538. Their daughter was Mary, Queen of Scots.
- François, Duke of Guise (1519–1563)
- Louise of Guise (10 January 1520 – 18 October 1542); married Charles I, Duke of Arschot, on 20 February 1541.
- Renée of Guise (2 September 1522 – 3 April 1602), Abbess of the Abbey of Saint-Pierre-les-Dames, Rheims. She was the only one of Antoinette's many children to outlive her mother.
- Charles of Guise (1524–1574), Duke of Chevreuse, Archbishop of Reims, and Charles, Cardinal de Guise.
- Claude, Duke of Aumale (1526–1573)
- Louis, Cardinal de Guise, (1527–1578)
- Philip of Guise (3 September 1529 – 24 September 1529, Joinville)
- Peter of Guise (3 April 1530); died young.
- Antoinette of Guise (31 August 1531 – 6 March 1561), Abbess of Faremoutiers Abbey
- François de Lorraine, Grand Prior (18 April 1534 – 6 March 1563)
- René II de Lorraine, Marquis d'Elbeuf (1536–1566)

== Sources ==
- Carroll, Stuart (2011). Martyrs and Murderers: The Guise Family and the Making of Europe. Oxford University Press.
- Potter, David (1995). A History of France, 1460–1560: The Emergence of a Nation State. St. Martin's Press.
- Ward, A.W.; Prothero, G.W.; Leathes, Stanley, eds. (1911). The Cambridge Modern History. Cambridge University Press.
- Wellman, Kathleen (2013). Queens and Mistresses of Renaissance France. Yale University Press.
