= Louis I de Lorraine, Cardinal de Guise =

French cardinal (1527–1578)

Louis I de Lorraine
- Cardinal; Bishop of Metz
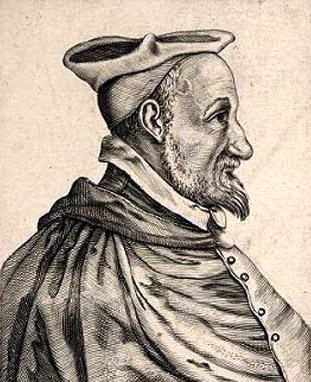
- Portrait of the Cardinal
- Church: Roman Catholic Church
- Diocese: Metz
- Appointed: 5 October 1568
- Term ended: 29 March 1578
- Predecessor: François de Beaucaire de Péguillon
- Successor: Charles de Lorraine-Vaudémont
- Other post: Cardinal-priest of San Tommaso in Parione
- Previous posts: Bishop of Troyes (1545-1550); Bishop of Albi (1550-1561); Archbishop of Sens (1561-1562)

Orders
- Consecration: 1 April 1571 by Charles de Lorraine
- Created cardinal: 22 December 1553 by Pope Julius III
- Rank: Cardinal-priest

Personal details
- Born: 21 October 1527 Joinville, France
- Died: 29 March 1578 (aged 50) Paris, France
- Children: 1 (Anna oo Jean Charles de Janowicz)

Coat of arms

Louis de Lorraine, cardinal de Guise et prince-évêque de Metz (21 October 1527, in Joinville, Champagne – 29 March 1578, in Paris) was a French Roman Catholic cardinal and Bishop during the Italian Wars and French Wars of Religion. The fourth son of Claude, Duke of Guise and Antoinette de Bourbon he was destined from a young age for a church career. At the age of 18 he was appointed Bishop of Troyes, a position he could only serve in an administrative capacity as he would not reach the Canonical Age for another 9 years. Having served in this position for 5 years, he transferred to become Bishop of Albi, staying in this role until 1561, when he was replaced due to his lethargic suppression of 'heresy'. From here he moved to become Archbishop of Sens, a see he would hold from 1561 to 1562, during which time a massacre of Protestants would occur in the city. By 1562 he decided to retire from active episcopal involvement. Nevertheless, he would become Prince-Bishop of Metz in 1568, an office he would hold until his death a decade later. While he lacked much interest in spiritual matters and was renowned for his drinking, he built up a considerable empire of abbeys during his life, which he passed on to his nephew Claude, chevalier d'Aumale.

In 1562 he travelled with his brothers to Saverne for a meeting with the Duke of Württemberg at which the family discussed converting to Lutheranism, a prospect that would be destroyed by the Massacre of Wassy perpetrated by François, Duke of Guise on his return to France. At the death of the Duke the following year, he and Aumale engineered his final days to be conservatively orthodox. In the years of peace that followed the first war of religion, he was the only member of his family who remained at court, representing the militant Catholic cause, something he would continue to do after the Peace of Longjumeau while other counsellors were trying to secure the peace. He crowned Henri III in 1575, and continued to advocate for committed prosecution of the civil wars in his final years, before dying in 1578.

== Early life and family ==
=== Siblings ===
Louis de Lorraine was born in 1527 the fourth son of Claude, Duke of Guise and Antoinette de Bourbon. His brothers François, Duke of Guise, Charles, Cardinal of Lorraine, Claude, Duke of Aumale, François de Lorraine, Grand Prior and René, Marquis of Elbeuf were born in 1519, 1524, 1526, 1534 and 1536 respectively. Meanwhile, his sister Marie de Guise, mother of Mary, Queen of Scots was born in 1515. To avoid a fracturing of the families inheritance, Louis was destined for a career in the church.

=== Ecclesiastic empire ===
While Cardinal Guise could not claim the same number of benefices as his older brother, he was not without many abbeys, and together they formed a large ecclesiastical empire. Guise for his part controlled the abbey of Notre Dame des Trois Fontaines, Saint-Pierre and Saint-Thierri in Champagne alone. With his elevation to Cardinal in 1553, the family could boast of having two Cardinals in the same generation. To maintain the families ecclesiastical empire more effectively, they engaged in benefice juggling. Cardinal Guise bequeathed several abbeys in commendam to his nephew Claude, Chevalier d'Aumale. In total these provided revenues of 40,000 livres to the young chevalier. Just one of these abbey's, which Guise resigned in 1572, that of Bec, had annual revenues of 24,000 livres which was twice the revenues provided by his brothers' duchy of Aumale. Upon Cardinal Guise's death in 1578, the chevalier acquired many more of his abbeys.

=== Cardinal des bouteilles ===
Cardinal Guise acquired in his lifetime the derisive moniker of 'cardinal des bouteilles' due to his reputed fondness for drinking. He acquired great wealth during his lifetime, and was the longest living of all the Guise brothers of his generation. However he lacked the capacity or inclination to be a leader in the way his brothers Lorraine and Guise had been in the previous decade.

His nephew was Louis II, Cardinal of Guise (made cardinal, 1578). His great-nephew was Louis III, Cardinal of Guise (made cardinal, 1615).

== Reign of Henri II ==
=== Troyes and Albi ===
Guise was made Bishop of Troyes on 11 May 1545, at the age of 18, a position he had to hold as administrator until he reached the canonical age of 27. Upon the death of François I in 1547, Cardinal Guise had reached an age at which he could participate actively in court life. During 1550 in his capacity as bishop of Troyes, he had been sent 5 suspects who had been accused of blasphemy and heresy. They had originally been sent to the Parlement of Paris for trial, but the Parlement simply sent them back for Cardinal Guise to hold in the local prison, without any further punishment. The most severe punishment the Parlement gave to a member of his diocese was a combination of banishment, confiscation of property and several days of public flogging. No suspected heretics in his diocese were killed in the chambre ardente during his tenure.

He was transferred to the see of Albi on 27 June 1550. After ceasing to be bishop of Albi in 1561, he was granted a pension of 10,000 livres. He maintained this pension through the next three bishops that succeeded him to the post, at the end of his life in 1578 Giulio de Medici was fruitlessly trying to get the Pope to cancel it. Alongside these revenues, he received 6000 livres from Condom and half of the revenues of Sens. This was despite the fact he had never served as bishop of Condom or Sens. Guise was created cardinal by Pope Julius III on 22 December 1553.

=== Italian wars ===
During the 1554 campaign season of the Italian Wars, the French achieved a surprise victory at the Battle of Renty, the king personally witnessed the battle from nearby, in the company of the Cardinal Guise. Shortly thereafter the spoils of the battle were presented to him.

By 1558, the Guise rival for political authority was a prisoner of the Spanish, and they enjoyed the fruits, a marriage secured between their niece and the dauphin. At the festivities, the Cardinals Bourbon, Lorraine, Guise, Sens, Meudon and Lenoncourt proceeded the dauphin who was brought forth by Navarre.

== Reign of Charles IX ==
=== Sens ===
Cardinal Guise was relieved of his authority over Albi in 1561, as it was felt that he lacked the energy to sufficiently prosecute a war against heresy in his diocese. He was replaced by Lorenzo Strozzi, who had called royal troops in to crush suspected heretics in his previous residence at Béziers. He received the archbishopric of Sens on 9 May 1561 but resigned it in 1562 to Cardinal de Pellevée. During Cardinal Guise's tenure as Archbishop of Sens, the Protestants of the town were massacred by militant elements of the populace in April 1562. With his departure from Sens, he retired from active involvement in the episcopacy.

=== Saverne ===
In February 1562, he travelled to Saverne to meet with the Duke of Württemberg, along with his brothers the Duke of Guise, Lorraine and the Grand Prior. Cardinal Guise and the Grand Prior would largely be a peripheral presence in the discussions that followed, with Guise and Lorraine exploring the possibility of converting to Lutheranism with the Protestant German duke. Lutheranism was a far more agreeable creed for the Guise than the Calvinism which dominated French Protestantism. The meeting ended positively, with Lorraine opining that he would trade his red robe for a black one. However the initiative of the meeting would be destroyed on the duke of Guise's return to France, his troops massacring a Protestant service as they passed through Wassy.

=== Assassination of the Duke of Guise ===
After the assassination of the Cardinal's brother, the duke of Guise in March 1563, Cardinal Guise and his brother Claude, Duke of Aumale hurried to the scene to see their brother off, and ensure his exit was stage managed in a suitably hardline Catholic fashion. The death of Antoine of Navarre, their cousin in October 1562 had been plagued with rumours of religious unorthodoxy. To this end, they selected an arch conservative confessor for him the Bishop of Riez. He reported that the duke enjoyed the Epistle of James in his final moments, a controversial epistile, described by Martin Luther as an 'epistle of straw', and that the duke defended the Real Presence. Those who were with Riez at the duke's deathbed disputed much of what he said, however by this point the words were already circulating in print. Aumale and Cardinal Guise had succeeded in their objective.

=== Peace ===
With the first war of religion brought to a close by the Peace of Amboise. Catherine de Medici worked hard to secure the nobility was reconciled with each other. To this end she sort to rehabilitate the Prince of Condé who had led the rebel army during the war. She proudly informed the duchesse de Guise that Cardinal Guise and Jacques, Duke of Nemours were reconciled with the Prince.

In the years of peace that followed, Cardinal Guise would be a regular fixture on the conseil privé. He and his brother Lorraine (after his return) represented the hardline Catholic position in the court, alongside the Duke of Montpensier and Nevers. During the royal tour that circumnavigated the kingdom from 1564 to 1566, Cardinal Guise was the only member of his family who accompanied the court on its journey. The rest of his family, feeling the sting of royal displeasure having retreated to Joinville.

In 1565 he was among the notables who attended the Bayonne Interview. During the meeting the Duke of Alba, negotiating for the Spanish complemented Cardinal Guise on his steadfast Catholicism. While the subject of the meeting was the fairly uncontroversial matter of marriage arrangements between the royal families of the two kingdoms. This was misinterpreted, deliberately or otherwise by leading Protestant nobles who were not present as a meeting to discuss the liquidation of French Protestants. This would be one of the impetuses for the Protestant coup that started the second war of religion. That same year, he attempted to prosecute a 'heretical' curate in the town of Courtenay, his efforts were however confounded when the seigneur de Courtenay seized the official that the Cardinal had sent, holding him as a hostage until the curate was released.

=== Third war of religion ===
At a council meeting in May 1568, the majority of the councillors present pre-occupied themselves with how best to ensure that the recent Peace of Longjumeau was properly enforced, proposing various methods by which the king could make his authority on the matter clear. For Cardinal Guise and Lorraine there was a different priority. They spent the meeting discussing how it was important for the Protestants to be brought back to Catholicism, and that until such time as that could be achieved, they must be kept under armed guard. For the moment their advice was ignored. Cardinal Guise was among those in the procession in Paris in 1568 at the outset of the third war of religion. Charles IX had just recovered from a grave illness, and as such the symbols of monarchical authority were carried through the streets by clergyman. On 5 October 1568 he was made Bishop of Metz. That same month, he and Lorraine travelled to Étampes in the company of the lieutenant-general of the kingdom, the king's brother, Anjou who had set out to campaign against the Protestants. During the war he would be dispatched to Spain to secure reinforcements for the crown from Philip II. Catherine wrote frustratedly to him in June, inquiring as to why the troops had not yet arrived.

At this time, the Duke of Nevers had emerged as the leading adviser to Anjou, who would one day be king as Henri III. Nevers counselled Anjou that Cardinal Guise was a dullard, who had no place on the conseil privé due to lacking the intelligence for matters of state.

=== Saint-Germain-en-Laye ===
As a mechanism to secure the Peace of Saint-Germain-en-Laye Catherine de Medici desired to establish a marriage between her daughter Marguerite de Valois and the Protestant King of Navarre. This was theologically difficult as such a marriage would require Papal blessing, due to involving a Protestant and Catholic. It proved impossible for the crown to acquire such dispensation. As a result, it was decided to do it on the authority of the king. To ensure this went over smoothly in the French church, pressure was applied to Cardinals Bourbon, Lorraine, Guise and Sens. All of them were eventually pressured into consenting.

== Reign of Henri III ==
He crowned Henry III of France at Reims on 13 February 1575. In early 1576, the Italian ambassador Morosini reported that Cardinal Guise had joined a faction of nobles, determined to resist any attempts to bring the fifth war of religion to a close without a total victory. Morosini also suggested the Duke of Guise, Nevers and Nemours as being party to this plot. Cardinal Guise again found himself in the war faction in 1577, at the outbreak of the sixth war of religion, aimed at delivering a harsher peace than that of the Peace of Monsieur, Cardinal Guise, the duke of Guise, Charles, Duke of Mayenne and Nevers all advocated for making war on the Protestants, despite the Estates General having refused to finance the effort. He died in 1578.

== See also ==
- House of Guise

== Sources ==
- Baird, Henry (1880). History of the Rise of the Huguenots: Vol 2 of 2. Hodder & Stoughton.
- Baumgartner, Frederic (1988). Henry II: King of France 1547-1559. Duke University Press.
- Baumgartner, Frederic (1986). Change and Continuity in the French Episcopate: The Bishops and the Wars of Religion 1547-1610.
- Carroll, Stuart (2005). Noble Power during the French Wars of Religion: The Guise Affinity and the Catholic Cause in Normandy. Cambridge University Press.
- Carroll, Stuart (2009). Martyrs and Murderers: The Guise Family and the Making of Europe. Oxford University Press.
- Cloulas, Ivan (1985). Henri II. Fayard.
- Diefendorf, Barbara (1991). Beneath the Cross: Catholics and Huguenots in Sixteenth Century Paris. Oxford University Press.
- Durot, Éric (2012). François de Lorraine, duc de Guise entre Dieu et le Roi. Classiques Garnier.
- Evennett, H. Outram (1930). The Cardinal of Lorraine and the Council of Trent: A Study in the Counter. Cambridge at the University Press.
- Jouanna, Arlette (1998). Histoire et Dictionnaire des Guerres de Religion. Bouquins.
- Jouanna, Arlette (2007). The St Bartholomew's Day Massacre: The Mysteries of a Crime of State. Manchester University Press.
- Knecht, Robert (2010). The French Wars of Religion, 1559-1598. Routledge.
- Knecht, Robert (2014). Catherine de' Medici. Routledge.
- Knecht, Robert (2016). Hero or Tyrant? Henry III, King of France, 1574-1589. Routledge.
- Konnert, Mark W. (2006). Local Politics in the French Wars of Religion: The Towns of Champagne, the Duc de Guise, and the Catholic League, 1560-95. Routledge.
- Roberts, Penny (1996). A City in Conflict: Troyes during the French Wars of Religion. Manchester University Press.
- Roberts, Penny (2013). Peace and Authority during the French Religious Wars c.1560-1600. Palgrave Macmillan.
- Salmon, J.H.M (1975). Society in Crisis: France during the Sixteenth Century. Metheun & Co.
- Sutherland, Nicola (1980). The Huguenot Struggle for Recognition. Yale University Press.
- Wellman, Kathleen (2013). Queens and Mistresses of Renaissance France. Yale University Press.
