= Peter Canvane =

American physician

- Born: 1720
- Died: 1786 (aged 65–66); Brussels
- Occupation: Physician

Peter Canvane FRS (1720–1786) was an American physician.

== Biography ==
Canvane an American by birth, entered as a medical student at Leyden on 4 March 1743. After graduating M.D. at Rheims he became a licentiate of the London College of Physicians in 1744. He practised for many years at St. Kitts in the West Indies, and afterwards settled at Bath. Later he retired to the continent, dying at Brussels in 1786. Canvane was a fellow of the Royal Society, and shares with Fraser, an army surgeon, the credit of introducing castor oil into this country, having had large experience of its beneficial employment in medicine in the West Indies. He published a pamphlet on the subject in 1766.
