= Chief Justice Eyre =

Chief Justice Eyre may refer to:

- Sir James Eyre (judge), Chief Justice of the Common Pleas, 1793–1799
- Sir Robert Eyre, Chief Justice of the Common Pleas, 1725–1735

== See also ==
- Justice Eyre (disambiguation)
- Justice in eyre, the highest magistrates in English law
- Justice Ayre, judicial circuit north and south of the River Forth in Scotland
