= Justice Eyre =

Justice Eyre may refer to:

- Giles Eyre (c. 1635–1695), English judge who served as Justice of the King's Bench
- Samuel Eyre (1633–1698), English judge who served as Justice of the King's Bench
- Stephen Eyre (born 1957), English judge who serves as Justice of the High Court

== See also ==
- Chief Justice Eyre (disambiguation)
