= Mary of Guise =

Queen of Scotland from 1538 to 1542

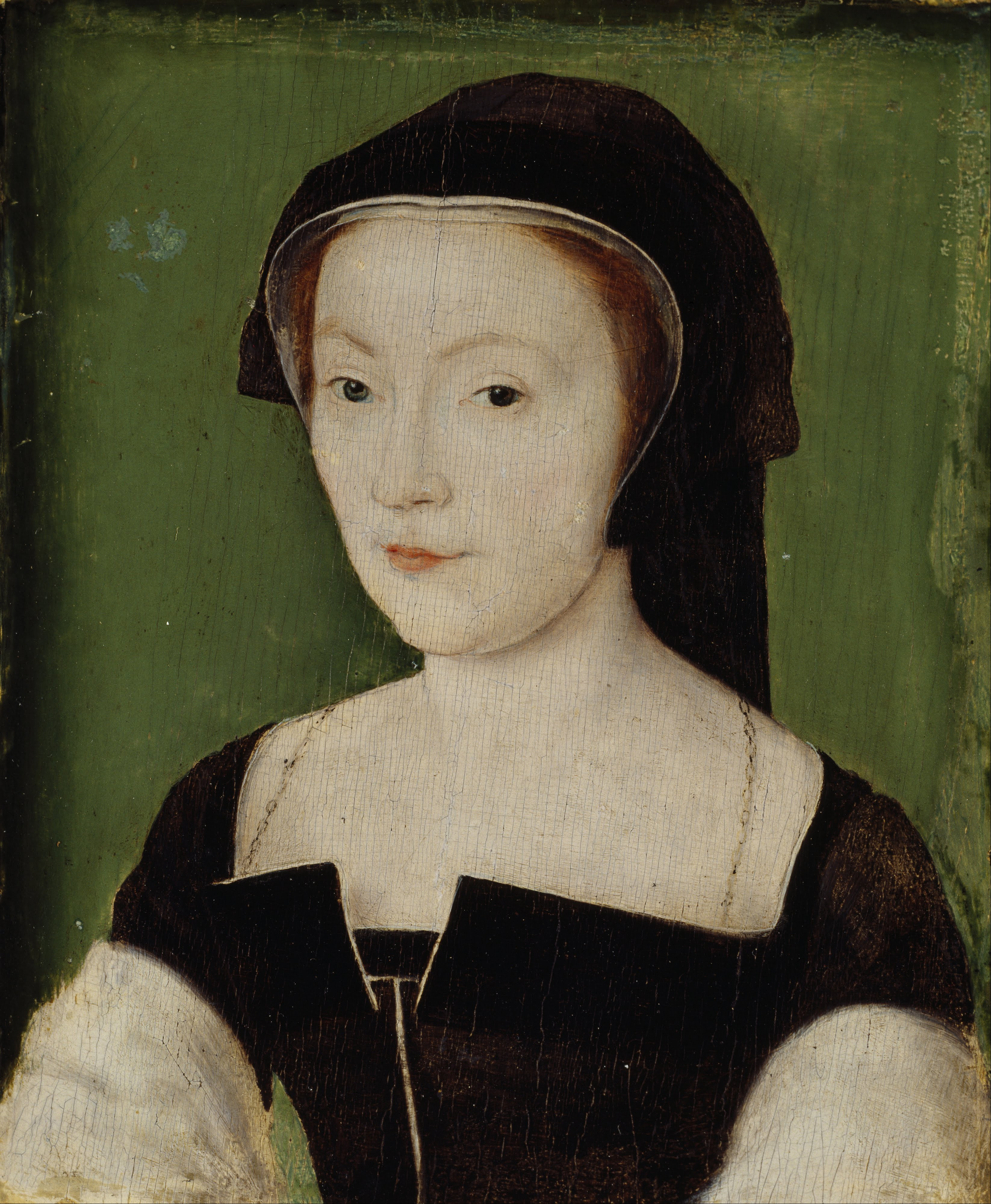
- Portrait attributed to Corneille de Lyon, c. 1537

Queen consort of Scotland
- Tenure: 9 May 1538 – 14 December 1542
- Coronation: 22 February 1540

Queen regent of Scotland
- Regency: 12 April 1554 – 11 June 1560
- Monarch: Mary
- Born: 22 November 1515; Château des ducs de Bar, Bar-le-Duc, Duchy of Lorraine, Holy Roman Empire
- Died: 11 June 1560 (aged 44); Edinburgh Castle, Edinburgh, Scotland
- Burial: July 1561; Saint-Pierre-les-Dames, Reims, France
- Spouses: Louis II, Duke of Longueville (m. 1534; died 1537) James V of Scotland (m. 1538; died 1542)
- Issue more...: François III, Duke of Longueville; Louis d'Orléans; James, Duke of Rothesay; Robert, Duke of Albany; Mary, Queen of Scots
- House: Guise
- Father: Claude, Duke of Guise
- Mother: Antoinette de Bourbon

Mary of Guise (French: Marie de Guise; 22 November 1515 – 11 June 1560), also called Mary of Lorraine, was Queen of Scotland from 1538 until 1542, as the second wife of King James V. She was a French noblewoman of the House of Guise, a cadet branch of the House of Lorraine and one of the most powerful families in France. As the mother of Mary, Queen of Scots, she was a key figure in the political and religious upheaval that marked mid-16th-century Scotland, ruling the kingdom as queen regent on behalf of her daughter from 1554 until her death in 1560.

The eldest of the twelve children born to Claude, Duke of Guise, and Antoinette of Bourbon, in 1534 Mary was married to Louis II d'Orléans, Duke of Longueville, the Grand Chamberlain of France. The marriage was arranged by King Francis I of France, but proved shortlived. The Duke of Longueville died in 1537, and the widower kings of England and Scotland, Henry VIII and James V, both sought the Duchess of Longueville's hand. After much persuasion from Francis I and James V, who wrote a personal letter pleading for her hand and counsel, Mary eventually relented and agreed to marry the King of Scots. Following the new queen's arrival in Scotland, James and Mary were married in person in June 1538 at St Andrews Cathedral. Mary was crowned queen at Holyrood Abbey on 22 February 1540, and the marriage produced three children in quick succession: James, Duke of Rothesay; Robert, Duke of Albany; and Mary. Both sons died in April 1541, just 14 hours apart, and when James V himself died in December 1542, his only surviving heir, Mary, became Queen of Scots at the age of six days.

James V's death thrust Mary of Guise into the political arena as mother of the infant Queen of Scots, with the government of Scotland entrusted to James Hamilton, 2nd Earl of Arran, as regent during the early years of the minority and the Rough Wooing. With the Treaty of Haddington in 1548, the child queen Mary was betrothed to Francis, the Dauphin of France, and was sent to be brought up in France under the protection of King Henry II. Mary of Guise replaced Arran as regent in 1554, and her regency was dominated by her determination to protect and advance the dynastic interests of her daughter, maintain the Franco-Scottish alliance, and reassert the power of the Scottish crown. Throughout her regency, Mary displayed tolerance towards the religious reform movement, and implemented a policy of accommodation towards her Protestant subjects, though she was ultimately unable to prevent the Scottish Reformation.

== Early life ==
Mary was born at Bar-le-Duc, Lorraine, the eldest daughter of Claude, Duke of Guise, head of the House of Guise, and his wife Antoinette of Bourbon, herself the daughter of Francis, Count of Vendome, and Marie de Luxembourg. Among her 11 siblings were François, Duke of Guise; Claude, Duke of Aumale; Charles, Cardinal of Lorraine; and Louis I, Cardinal of Guise.

When Mary was five, she was godmother to her younger sister Louise. Not long afterward, she joined her grandmother Philippa of Guelders in the convent of the Poor Clares at Pont-à-Mousson. Mary grew to be exceptionally tall by the standards of her time and reached a height of 5 feet 11 inches (1.80 metres). Her mother mentioned that she suffered from bad colds. When she was about 14 her uncle Antoine, Duke of Lorraine, and aunt Renée of Bourbon visited her. Impressed by their niece's qualities and stature, they took her away from the convent and prepared her for life at the French court. In 1531, Mary made her first appearance and debut at the wedding of Francis I and Eleanor of Austria. She established a friendship with the king's daughters Madeleine (whom she would later succeed as Queen of Scots) and Margaret.

== Duchess of Longueville ==
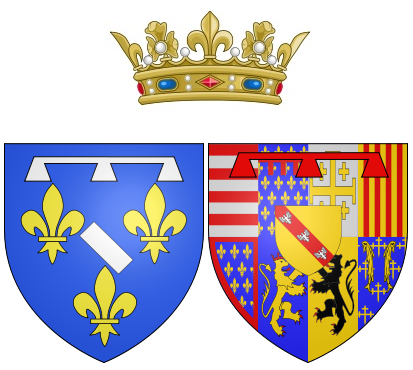
Coat of arms of Mary as Duchess of Longueville

On 4 August 1534, at the age of 18, she became Duchess of Longueville by marrying Louis II d'Orléans, Duke of Longueville, the Grand Chamberlain of France, at the Louvre Palace. Their union turned out to be happy, but brief. On 30 October 1535, Mary gave birth to her first son, Francis, but on 9 June 1537, Louis died at Rouen and left her a pregnant widow at the age of 21. For the rest of her life, Mary kept the last letter from her bon mari et ami (her good husband and friend) Louis, which mentioned his illness and explained his absence at Rouen. It can still be seen at the National Library of Scotland. On 4 August 1537, Mary gave birth to their second son, who was named Louis after his deceased father. Louis died very young, but Francis wrote letters to his mother in Scotland. On 22 March 1545 he sent a piece of string to show how tall he was, and on 2 July 1546 he sent her his portrait.

== Marriage negotiations ==
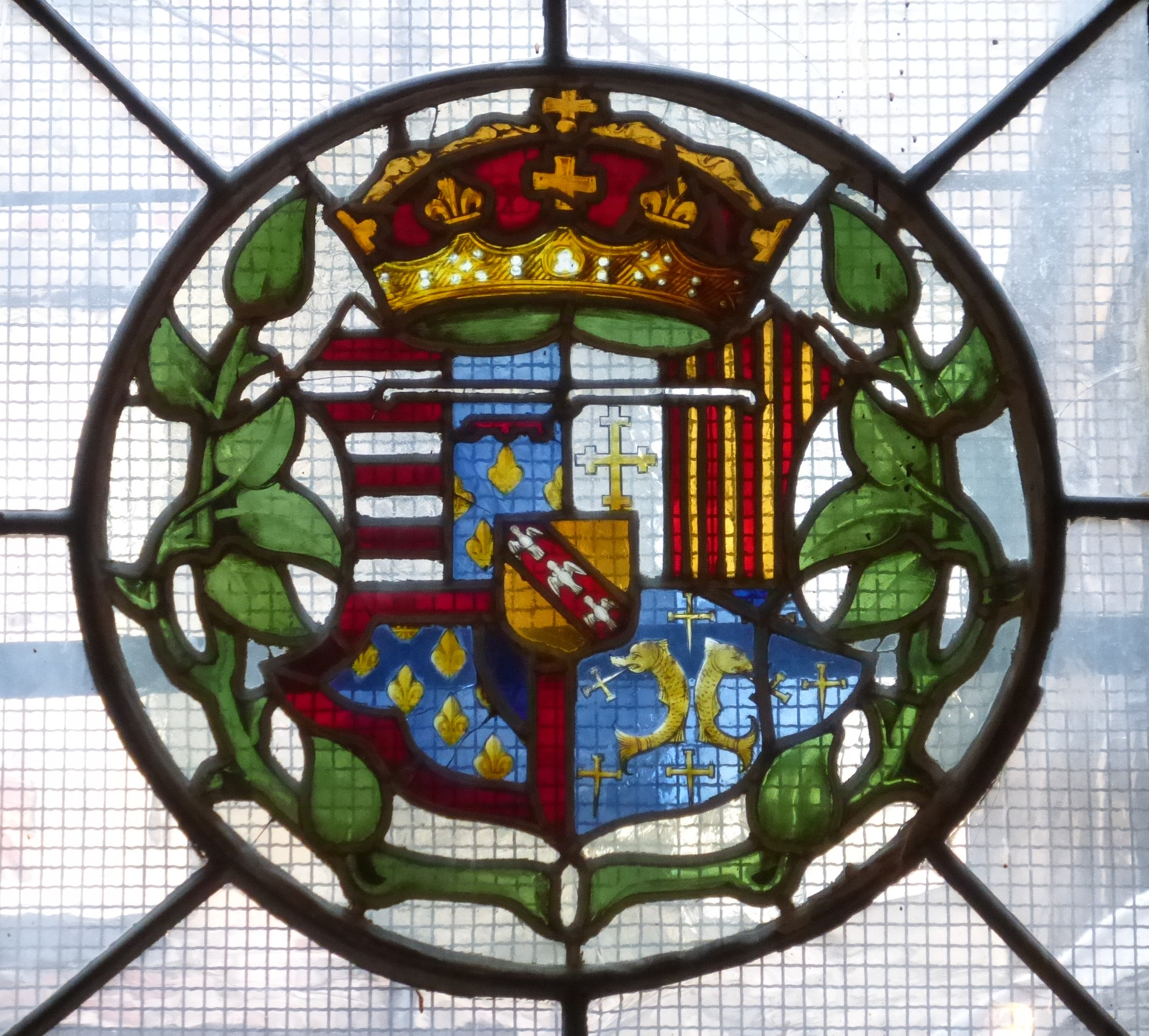
Arms of Mary of Guise, Magdalen Chapel, Edinburgh

Later, in 1537, Mary became the focus of marriage negotiations with James V of Scotland, who had lost his first wife, Madeleine of Valois, to tuberculosis, and wanted a second French bride to further the interests of the Franco-Scottish alliance against England. According to a 17th-century writer, William Drummond of Hawthornden, James V had noticed the attractions of Mary when he went to France to meet Madeleine and Mary of Bourbon, and she was next in his affections. It is known that Mary had attended the wedding of James and Madeleine.

Henry VIII of England, whose third wife Jane Seymour had just died, also asked for Mary's hand in an attempt to frustrate James' plan. In December 1537, Henry VIII told Castillon, the French ambassador in London, that he was big in person and had need of a big wife. Allegedly, Mary refused the offer by saying: "I may be a big woman, but I have a very little neck", a reference to Anne Boleyn, who had joked before her death that the executioner would find killing her easy because she had "a little neck".

King Francis I of France accepted James's proposal over Henry's and conveyed his wishes to Mary's father. Francis had a marriage contract prepared that offered James a dowry as large as if Mary had been born a princess of France. Mary's mother found the contract "marvellously strange", because the king had included Mary's son's inheritance in the dowry. Mary received the news with shock and alarm, as she did not wish to leave family and country, especially as she had just lost her first husband and her younger son. Reportedly, her father tried to delay matters, apparently until James, perhaps sensing her reluctance, wrote to her, appealing for her advice and support. However, the authenticity of this letter, which was first produced in 1935, has been questioned.

David Beaton (who was made a cardinal in 1538) travelled to France for the marriage negotiations. He wrote to James V from Lyon on 22 October 1537 that Mary was "stark (strong), well complexioned, and fit to travel". Beaton wrote that the Duke of Guise was "marvellous desirous of the expedition and hasty end of the matter", and had already consulted with his brother, the Duke of Lorraine, and Mary herself, who was with her mother in Champagne waiting for the resolution of the negotiations. The marriage contract was finalized in January 1538, with James V receiving a dowry of 150,000 livres. As was customary, if the king died first, Mary would retain for her lifetime her jointure houses of Falkland Palace, Stirling Castle, Dingwall Castle and Threave Castle, along with the rentals of the earldoms of Fife, Strathearn, Ross and Orkney, and the lordships of Galloway, Ardmannoch and the Isles.

Finally, Mary accepted the offer and made hurried plans for departure. The proxy wedding of James V and Mary of Guise was held on 9 May 1538 in the Sainte Chapelle at the Château de Châteaudun. Some 2,000 Scottish lords and barons came from Scotland aboard a fleet of ships under Lord Maxwell to attend. Lord Maxwell brought a diamond ring and stood as proxy for James V at the wedding ceremony on 9 May 1538.

== Queen of Scots ==
Lord Maxwell, and the other lords and barons who had come to France, travelled back to Scotland with Mary of Guise, who sailed from Le Havre on 10 June 1538, leaving behind her three-year-old son, Francis, Duke of Longueville. She landed in Scotland 6 days later at Crail in Fife. She came in a fleet of three French galleys commanded by Jacques de Fountaines, Sieur de Mormoulins. She was formally received by the king at St Andrews a few days later amid pageants and plays performed in her honour. James and Mary were married in person at St Andrews Cathedral on 18 June 1538. James's mother Margaret Tudor wrote to her brother Henry VIII in July, "I trust she will prove a wise Princess. I have been much in her company, and she bears herself very honourably to me, with very good entertaining."

Celebrations seem to have included a tournament and a new costume was bought for the Queen's fool. In August, Mary went into the Highlands with James on a hunting trip to Glen Finglas, with six ladies-in-waiting. She soon returned to Stirling Castle, leaving James to hunt. In September James went south to hunt at Cramalt and Mary remained at Linlithgow Palace. Wild boar were sent to stock the park at Falkland from Elbeuf near Rouen, and Mary of Guise's younger brother René II de Lorraine, Marquis d'Elbeuf later became an enthusiast for boar hunt with dogs and toiles, known as le vautrait.

The chronicle known as the Diurnal of Occurrents mentions her ceremonial royal entry to Edinburgh on Saint Margaret's Day (16 November). The Duchess of Guise sent her masons, including Nicolas Roy, miners and an armourer. Mary had a French painter, Pierre Quesnel, to decorate her palaces. Her household included a dwarf and a fool who were both dressed in green. In December 1538, the court was at Falkland Palace, and her ladies in waiting were given gowns of purple or black velvet, with white taffeta, red damask, or black satin skirts. Her serving women got gowns of Paris black and French brown cloth.

On 24 August 1539 Mary and James V made a pilgrimage to the Isle of May in the Forth. They took three ships, the Unicorn, the Little Unicorn and the Mary Willoughby. It was believed that a visit to the shrine of St Adrian could help a woman become pregnant, and Mary of Guise made a note of her pilgrimages in Scotland.

She was crowned queen at Holyrood Abbey on 22 February 1540. Preparations for her coronation had begun in October 1539 when the jeweller John Mosman made a new crown from Scottish gold and her silver sceptre was gilded. Payments made for the ceremony include the hanging of tapestries; carrying church furnishings from the Palace chapel into the Abbey; the attendance of eleven chaplains; boards for stages in the Abbey; and messengers sent to summon the ladies of the kingdom. A salute of 30 guns was fired from David's Tower in Edinburgh Castle, and there were fireworks devised by James and made by his royal gunners.

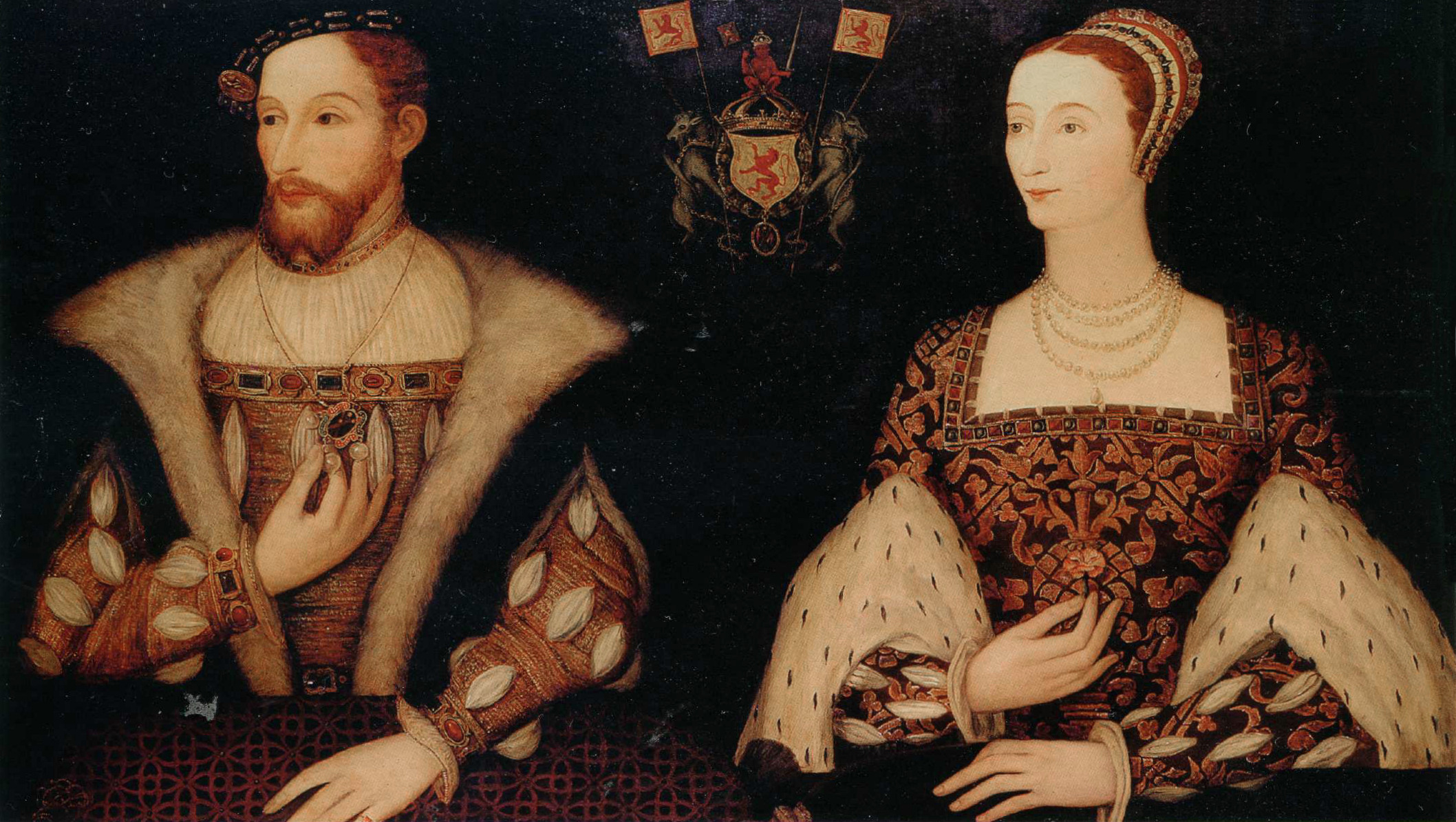
Mary of Guise and her second husband, King James V of Scotland

James and Mary had two sons: James, Duke of Rothesay (born 22 May 1540 at St Andrews), and Robert, Duke of Albany (born and baptised on 12 April 1541); however, they died 14 hours apart on 21 and 20 April, respectively, in 1541, when James was nearly one year old and Robert was nine days old. Mary's mother Antoinette of Bourbon wrote that the couple was still young and should hope for more children. She thought a change of wet nurse and over-feeding contributed.

The third and last child of the union was a daughter Mary. Mary of Guise prepared for her lying-in at Linlithgow Palace at Michaelmas 1542. James's ambassadors told Henry VIII that the Scottish king was reluctant to travel to meet him in England before the birth. Mary was born on 8 December 1542. James died six days later at Falkland Palace, without ever seeing his daughter. The infant Mary became queen of Scotland and the youngest ever monarch in Great Britain.

== Arran's regency ==
Following James V's death in 1542, the government of Scotland was first entrusted to James Hamilton, 2nd Earl of Arran, as regent. Henry VIII of England wished the infant Mary to marry his son, Prince Edward. This led to internal conflicts in Scotland between those who favoured the marriage and those who preferred the alliance with France and led to an English invasion, the so-called Rough Wooing. Guise told English diplomat Ralph Sadler that Regent Arran was a "simple man" and she could easily find out his "whole intent".

At first Mary of Guise stayed at Linlithgow Palace. Sadler visited her on 22 March 1543 to see the infant Mary for the first time. Guise showed him the infant out of her swaddling, to show the child was healthy, because Arran had spread rumours the child was sickly. Sadler wrote that the infant was "as goodly a child I have seen, and like to live". Guise reminded him of Regent Arran's plans to have his son James Hamilton marry Princess Elizabeth. Guise tried to get Sadler to intercede with Regent Arran to release her ally Cardinal Beaton from imprisonment, alleging his political expertise could be employed to mutual benefit.

In April 1543, Arran heard a rumour that Henry VIII now wished to make Mary of Guise his sixth wife. He confronted Mary with this and she prevaricated, learning from him (as she had already guessed) that he told everything to Sadler. She then sent her confidant Lord Fleming to Sadler to report the conversation. In turn, Sadler relayed to Henry VIII his account of "every man's tale whereby your grace may perceive the perplexed state of affairs in Scotland."

In July 1543, after a standoff between the forces of Beaton and Arran near Linlithgow, she moved with the infant Mary to Stirling Castle. When Ralph Sadler spoke to her again in August, Guise assured him the English marriage would go ahead when Mary was ten years old. In the meantime Mary was safe at Stirling; Guise said she was glad to be at Stirling, and "much she praised there about the house."

It soon became clear to Henry VIII that Mary and Edward would not be married, despite Scottish promises and the Treaty of Greenwich, and at the end of 1543 he launched the war now called the Rough Wooing, hoping to turn the situation around. Arran spent Christmas with Mary of Guise at Stirling where they played cards. In 1544 she spearheaded an unsuccessful attempt to replace Arran as regent, After a convention of nobility at Stirling in June suggested she should be regent, Guise was subsequently appointed to a council to advise Arran.

=== At Haddington ===
After a Scottish defeat at the Battle of Pinkie in September 1547, French military aid weakened English resolve and increased the power base of Mary of Guise, who remained in Scotland. Equipped with a newly painted spear for her royal standard, Mary came to view the progress of the siege of Haddington in July 1548. On 9 July her party came in range of the English guns and sixteen of her entourage were killed around her. Following this terrifying incident, Mary gave one of her gunners at Haddington, Andro Straitoun, a reward of a month's wages, £4 Scots.

By the resolution of the Scottish Parliament made at Haddington Abbey on 7 July, the child Mary was sent to France in August 1548 to be raised with her husband-to-be, the dauphin Francis, son of Henry II of France. Guise first planned to sail with Mary from Dumbarton as far as Whithorn where she would make pilgrimage. Instead, she returned for a council meeting in Edinburgh.

=== Conclusion of the war ===
At this time, the dedication of the Scottish book, The Complaynt of Scotland, recalled Mary of Guise's descent from Godfrey de Bouillon and claimed her courage and virtue exceeded those of the ancient heroines Tomyris, Semiramis and Penthesilea.

After negotiating on Christmas Day 1549 at Stirling Castle for more French guns for the siege of Broughty Castle, she showed more prudence by watching the successful assault on Wednesday 6 February 1550 from a vantage point across the Tay. Paul de Thermes led the French troops, 240 were injured and 50 killed. The garrison surrendered six days later at midnight. Mary of Guise was triumphant, writing that "the English had left nothing behind but the plague."

The peace process began and Scotland was included in the Treaty of Boulogne of 24 March 1550. As part of the treaty, Mary's brother Claude, Marquis de Mayenne, was one of six French hostages sent to England. After their father died on 12 April 1550, Claude was allowed to come to Scotland with a passport from Edward VI dated 11 May. Claude wrote from Edinburgh on 18 May that he would survey the fortifications of the realm. After the Treaty was signed, Mary of Guise was able to travel to France to see her family. She asked Henry II of France to make arrangements, and on 23 July he wrote to Edward VI for her passport and safe conduct.

== Travels in France and England ==
Mary left Scotland on 6 September 1550 and arrived at Dieppe in time to participate in a festival with the French court at Rouen with her daughter on 1 October 1550. At Rouen, Mary and the Queen of Scots rode in procession behind soldiers carrying banners depicting Scottish fortresses recently defended and recovered by the French. She brought with her a large retinue of Scottish gentlemen, including the earls of Huntly, Cassillis, Sutherland, Marischal and Wigtown, plus lords Home and Maxwell, and the bishops of Caithness and Galloway. Historians have analysed the Scottish retinue as a team-building exercise for Mary.

Over the winter she stayed with the French court at Blois, then spent the summer with Henry II visiting Tours, Angers and Nantes. She bought fabrics and clothes from Robert Fichepain and René Tardif. At Amboise in April, Mary was sickened by news of a plot to poison the young queen of Scots. A Scottish would-be poisoner, Robert Stewart, discovered in London was delivered to the French in May. Throughout her time in France, Mary was anxious to gain the best settlement for her daughter's marriage to the dauphin and financial support for herself in Scotland. At Tours in May, a cynical English observer, John Mason, who scanned the Scottish retinue for signs of dissent, reported, "the Dowager of Scotland maketh all this court weary of her, such an importunate beggar is she for herself. The king would fain be rid of her. The trucking is about money matters".

While accompanying her to Dieppe on her return, her son Francis died at Amiens on 22 September 1551. In October 1551, she met Edward VI in England. Mary landed at Portsmouth and was given, by the King, an escort of gentlemen to accompany her to London. She stayed her first night at Southwick Priory. On her way to London she stopped at Warblington, Cowdray, Hampton Court, where she was entertained by the Marquess and Marchioness of Northampton, and Fulham Palace. At his meeting with Mary at Whitehall Palace, Edward gave her a diamond ring and two horses with trappings of russet gold tinsel. The ring, "sett with a fayer table diamount", had belonged to Catherine Parr. The Princess Mary Tudor declined to attend her visit. According to John Aylmer, the Princess Elizabeth was present, and unlike the other women at Edward's court she did not try to emulate the novel French "frounsed, curled and double-curled" hairstyles of Guise's Scottish retinue.

On her way north to Scotland Ralph Sadler conveyed her through Hertfordshire, and she stopped at Robert Chester's house at Royston Priory and the house of the Dowager Duchess of Suffolk at Grimsthorpe Castle near Stamford. Arran summoned some of the barons of East Lothian to meet her at Berwick, and the gentlemen of Selkirk, Jedburgh and Duns, Scottish Borders, Peebles and Lauder, Haddington, Dunbar and North Berwick were summoned to meet her at Our Lady Kirk of Steill on 24 November 1551. Six cart loads of breech-loading cannon chambers were brought from the armoury at Leith up to Edinburgh Castle to fire salutes on her return.

== Residences in Leith ==
Mary resided in other palaces and castles in Scotland, apart from Holyrood and Edinburgh Castle, and lodged in at least two houses on Edinburgh's High Street. She also had two houses, in Leith, Edinburgh's port, where a garrison of French troops were stationed. According to tradition, one house was near the Shore at the Paunch Market, afterwards called Queen Street in her honour. This residence housed Oliver Cromwell in 1651 and was demolished in 1849. Additionally, she had a residence in Quality Street Wynd on Rotten Row (now called Water Street). Her coat of arms carved in stone was recovered from this site and is now inside South Leith Parish Church.

== Regent of Scotland ==
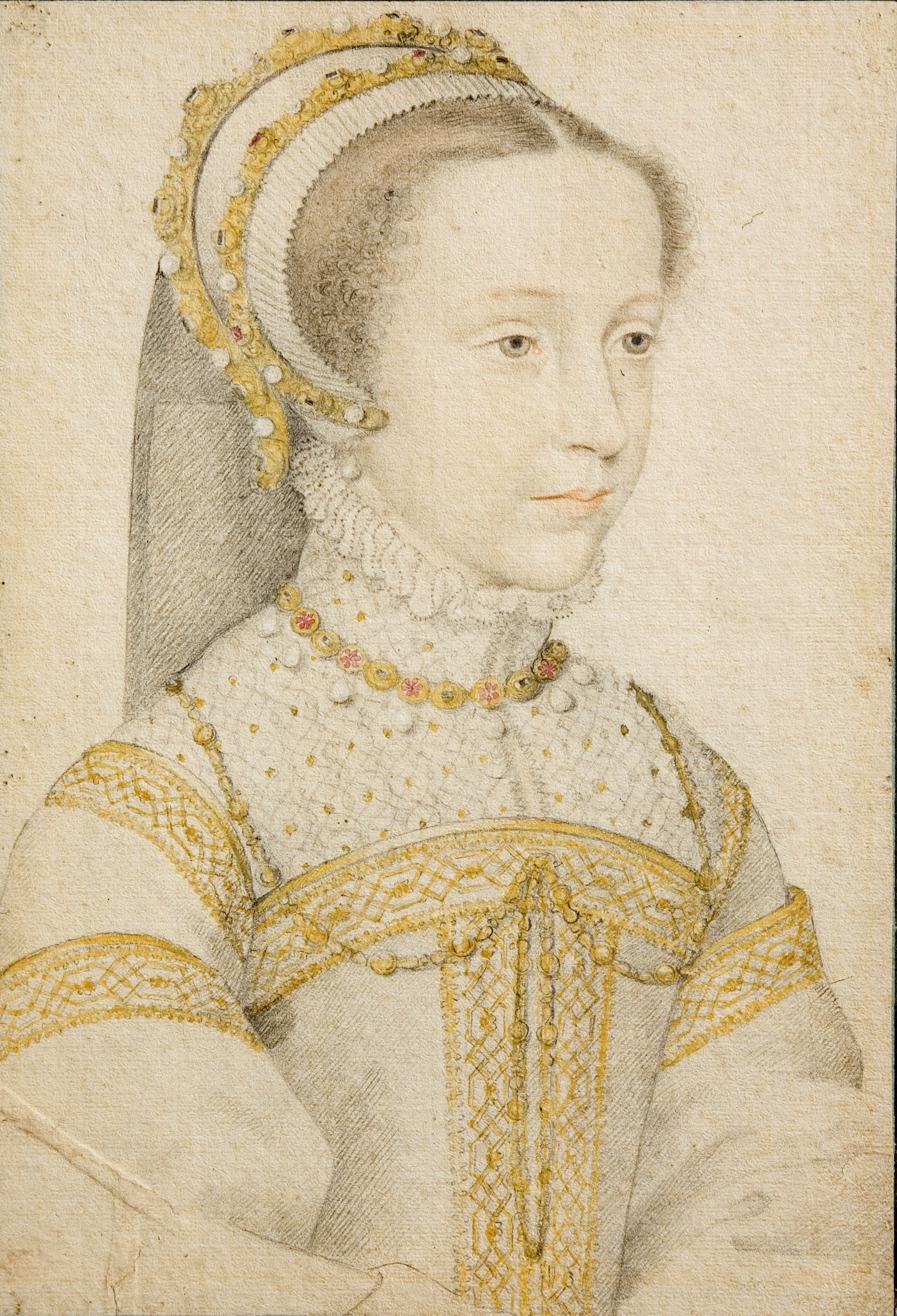
Mary, Queen of Scots, Mary of Guise's daughter, for whom she acted as regent from 1554 to 1560

In December 1552, Mary of Austria, Queen of Hungary, sister of Holy Roman Emperor Charles V, pointed out to Mary that her diplomatic complaints had no force and must come from Arran. Furthermore, she was dissatisfied by Mary's evident friendship with France. Mary's power was increasing. In May 1553, the imperial ambassador in London, Jean Scheyfve, heard she had challenged Arran's regency and proposed James Stewart, 1st Earl of Moray, her illegitimate step-son, as a replacement. From August 1553, she wrote to the French ambassador in London, Antoine de Noailles, using cipher code.

Mary herself became regent on 12 April 1554 at a meeting of Parliament. Henri Cleutin is said to have placed the crown on her head, although the nature of any ceremony is uncertain. Celebrations included a play written by William Lauder and a procession called the "Convoy of the Moors" on 10 June. Edinburgh's burgh council gave her two silver gilt cups bought from the merchants Alexander Park and Oglier Coqueil. The eleven-year-old Queen Mary sent her congratulations to "la Royne, ma mere" ("the Queen, my mother") from the Château de Meudon at Easter, where she was staying with her grandmother and her uncle, the Cardinal of Lorraine.

In many affairs, Mary of Guise consulted her brothers in France—the Cardinal of Lorraine, and François, Duke of Guise, both of whom held government positions in France—so that Scotland and France worked as allies in dealing with other nations. Henry II's representative in Scotland from 1546 to 1560 was an ambassador resident, Henri Cleutin, who had been effectively in charge of Scotland during her trip to France. During her regency (1554–1560), Frenchmen were put in charge of the treasury and the Great Seal, while the French ambassador sometimes attended the Privy Council. Yves de Rubay was Master of Requests and Keeper of the Seals and Bartholomew de Villemore was Comptroller and Receiver-General of Revenue. Although Cleutin seems to have been universally popular, the resentment of the Scottish nobility at these appointments fuelled the coming crisis.

Mary quickly began to deal effectively with Scottish affairs. In July 1554, she travelled to Jedburgh to hold a Justice Ayre for a fortnight, hoping to quell the longstanding feud between the Scott and Kerr border clans. She was escorted by armed horsemen commanded by Cleutin. In the autumn she paid for a ship, troops and a cannon to help the Earl of Sutherland arrest Iye du Mackay, Lord Reay, who had caused mischief in Sutherland. With much less success the Earls of Huntly and Argyll were despatched to pass with fire and sword to Moidart and Lewis. Huntly's failure led to his imprisonment. During another progress in 1556 she visited Inverness, Ross, Elgin, Banff and Aberdeen.

One measure made by Parliament in June 1555 was ineffective and caused problems and resentment. The offices of Deacon of the Crafts in burgh councils was abolished. This may have pleased influential merchants. Mary of Guise went to Perth to meet dissenters who disputed the right of craftsmen to be elected to the burgh council. Subsequently, the legislation was repealed. Scotland's burgh craft incorporations rewarded Guise for this reverse in policy by agreeing to contribute to a tax used for defence, including the fortification of Inchkeith. Some contributions were paid directly to the master of works, William MacDowall. Mary of Guise employed an Italian military engineer from Siena, Lorenzo Pomarelli, during the six years of her regency.

An English envoy Laurence Hussey was able to speak with her in Edinburgh in December 1556 and in January 1557 about a Russian diplomat, Osep Gregorovitch Napea, who had lost his belongings in the wreck of the Edward Bonaventure. Guise's efforts at domestic rule were hampered by the outbreak of international conflict in January 1557 and war with England, (later known as the "two years war"). An apparent set-back to Guise's command occurred in October, when she went south to Hume Castle and sent an army towards England. Instructed to cross the border and attack Wark Castle, the Scottish lords held their own council at Eckford and returned home. Efforts to make peace between England and Scotland were helped by Christophe d'Assonleville, a diplomat sent to England and Scotland by Philip II of Spain who was joint ruler of England at that time (husband of Queen Mary Tudor). The Scottish armed presence on the border was reduced in the first months of 1558.

== Conflict with Protestants ==
Mary's regency was threatened, however, by the growing influence of the Scottish Protestants. To an extent she had tolerated the growing number of Protestant preachers. She needed to win support for her pro-French policies, and they could expect no alternative support from England at a time when Mary Tudor ruled. The marriage of Mary Stuart, Queen of Scots, to the dauphin of France on 24 April 1558 was quickly followed by Mary Tudor's death and the succession to the throne of England by Elizabeth I on 17 November 1558. Mary Stuart's claim and rights of succession to the English throne depended in part on the Papal view of Elizabeth's legitimacy. If Henry II of France was to pursue Mary's claim with the Pope, as part of an ambitious plan that Scotland and England would succumb to French domination, he needed Scotland to be a secure Catholic country. Some modern historians such as Pamela E. Ritchie believe that the change to Guise's policy was not dramatic, but both Catholic and Protestant would perceive and react to the tense political situation. As the Scottish Reformation crisis was developing, Henry II died on 10 July 1559, and Mary Stuart became Queen Consort of France. In France, Mary and Francis II began to publicly display the arms of England in their blazon. This too was a motivation for English intervention in Scottish affairs.

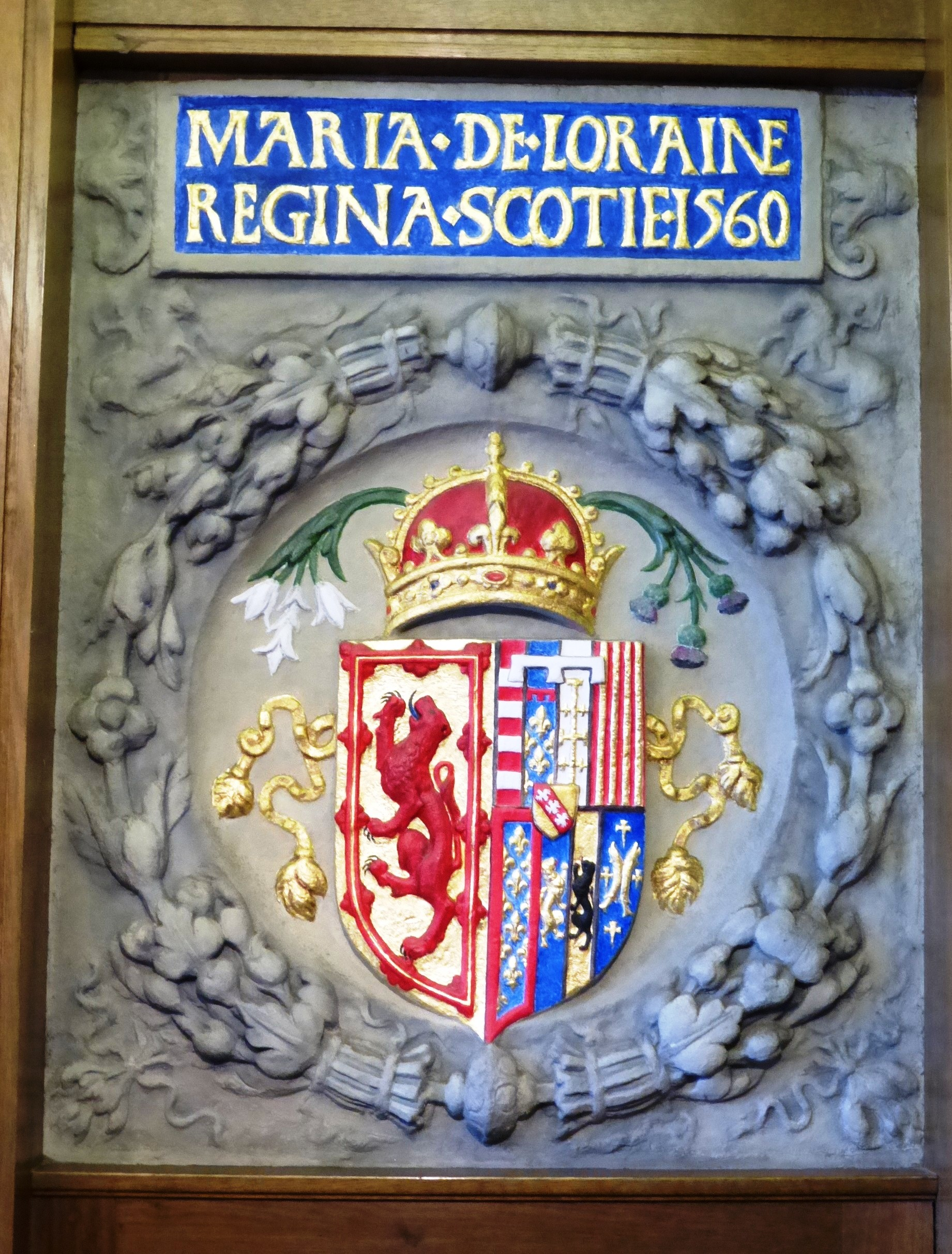
Mary's coat of arms, in South Leith Parish Church, showing Scotland impaled with Lorraine

In 1557, a group of Scottish lords who became known as the "Lords of the Congregation" drew up a covenant to "maintain, set forth, and establish the most blessed Word of God and his Congregation". This was followed by outbreaks of iconoclasm in 1558/59. At the same time, plans were being drawn up for a Reformed programme of parish worship and preaching, as local communities sought out Protestant ministers. In 1558, the Regent summoned the Protestant preachers to answer for their teaching, but backed down when lairds from the west country threatened to revolt.

The accession of the Protestant Elizabeth I in England in 1558 stirred the hopes and fears of Scottish Protestants. Elizabeth came to secretly support the Lords of the Congregation. In January 1559, the anonymous Beggars' Summons threatened friars with eviction in favour of beggars. This was calculated to appeal to the passions of the populace of towns who appeared to have particular complaints against friars. Fearing disorder and now determined by circumstance to show less tolerance, the Regent summoned the reformed preachers to appear before her at Stirling on 10 May. Insurrection followed. The men of Angus assembled in Dundee to accompany the preachers to Stirling, and on 4 May they were joined by John Knox, who had recently arrived from France. Stirred by Knox's sermons in Perth and Dundee, the mob sacked religious houses (including the tomb of James I in Perth). In response, the Regent marched on Perth, but was forced to withdraw and negotiate when another reformed contingent arrived from the west at Cupar Muir.

Among the Regent's ambassadors were the Earl of Argyll and Lord James Stewart, Earl of Moray, both professed Protestants. When the Regent stationed French mercenaries in Perth, both abandoned her and joined the Lords of the Congregation at St Andrews, where they were also joined by John Knox. Even Edinburgh soon fell to them in July, as Mary retreated to Dunbar. The Congregation Lords made a truce with Guise and signed the Articles of Leith at Leith Links on 25 July 1559 which promised religious tolerance, then withdrew to Stirling.

In September, the previous regent, the 2nd Earl of Arran, with the safe return of his son, accepted the leadership of the Lords of the Congregation and established a provisional government. However, Mary of Guise was reinforced by professional French troops. Some of these troops established themselves at Kinghorn in Fife, and after they destroyed Hallyards Castle, the house of William Kirkcaldy of Grange, Mary (according to Knox) declared, "Where is now John Knox's God? My God is now stronger than his, yea, even in Fife." In November, the rebels were driven back to Stirling.

Fighting continued in Fife. Mary of Guise, troubled by illness, contemplated resigning the Regency, and returning to France. René II de Lorraine, Marquis d'Elbeuf was appointed to rule as a French "viceroy" in her stead. His mission was abandoned, but more French troops arrived in Scotland. All seemed lost for the Protestant side until an English fleet arrived in the Firth of Forth in January 1560, which caused the French to retreat to Leith, the port of Edinburgh which Mary of Guise had re-fortified.

The Lords of the Congregation began negotiations with England. John Knox was excluded, as his published tract The First Blast of the Trumpet Against the Monstrous Regiment of Women, although it aimed at Mary I of England, rendered him unacceptable to the newly crowned Elizabeth I. The Treaty of Berwick, signed in February, agreed that England would act jointly with the Protestant Lords to expel the French. Elizabeth I sent an English land army into Scotland to join their Scottish allies in besieging the French at Leith. As the fighting continued, the English ambassador in France Nicholas Throckmorton praised Guise for having the "hart of a man of warre" and the English bishop John Jewel described her as "a woman with a man's courage".

== Death ==
After an English assault on Leith was repulsed with heavy losses, some of the leaders of the Lords of the Congregation came to Edinburgh Castle on 12 May 1560 and had dinner with Mary and the keeper of the castle, Lord Erskine. They discussed a plan that had been previously discussed, in which Mary would have travelled to France and met Elizabeth in England, and her brother would have been made viceroy in Scotland. The Lords again complained about Frenchmen being appointed to Scottish government posts. Negotiations to end the siege of Leith and demolish new fortifications at Dunbar Castle continued. The talks ended when permission was refused for the French commanders in Leith to come to the castle to discuss the proposals with Mary.

While continuing to fortify Edinburgh Castle, Mary became seriously ill, and over the course of the next eight days her mind began to wander; on some days she could not even speak. On 8 June she made her will. She died of dropsy on 11 June 1560.

She lay in state in the castle for a time, wrapped in cerecloth and covered with a white sheet, on a bed hung with black satin, attended by her ladies-in-waiting. Her body was then wrapped in lead and rested in a coffin on a bier in St Margaret's Chapel in Edinburgh Castle for several months. The chapel was hung with black cloth with a white taffeta cross above the body. On 18 March 1561, it was secretly carried from the castle at midnight and shipped to France. Mary, Queen of Scots attended her funeral at Fécamp in July 1561. Mary of Guise was interred at the church of Saint-Pierre-les-Dames, Reims, where Mary's sister Renée was abbess. A marble tomb was erected with a bronze statue of Mary, in royal robes, holding a sceptre and the rod of justice in one hand. The tomb was destroyed during the French revolution. Of Mary's five children, only her daughter Mary survived her.

In modern times, there has been speculation that Mary was assassinated (by poisoning), either by order of Queen Elizabeth I or possibly by others protecting the Queen's interests without any direct order from the Queen. However, no evidence supports such allegations, and there was an autopsy the day after she died. Mary's death was evidently from natural causes, since she herself complained she had become lame from the swelling of her legs in April and diagnosed herself as having dropsy. The swelling was confirmed by her enemy, John Knox, who wrote that in May, "began hir bellie and lothsome leggis to swell." Even in the political climate of the 16th century, in which some royal deaths were suspected to have been murders, none of Mary's contemporaries saw signs of "foul play" in her death.

The Regent's death made way for the Treaty of Edinburgh, in which France and England agreed they would each withdraw their troops from Scotland. Although the French commissioners were unwilling to make a treaty with the insurgent Lords of the Congregation, they offered the Scots certain concessions from King Francis and Queen Mary, including the right to summon a parliament according to use and custom. The effect of the treaty was to leave power in the hands of the pro-English Protestants.

== Household ==
Amongst records of her expenses and household there is a list of 27 gentlewomen or ladies-in-waiting. The names (modernised) of the "dames" or married women include; Lady Arran (Barbara Hamilton), Lady Cassillis (senior), Lady Erskine, Lady Elphinston, Lady Livingston and Coullombe (senior). The unmarried "demoiselles" were Margaret Hume, Margery Livingston (who later married James Ogilvie of Cardell), Jean Elphinston, Jean Murray, Annabell Murray, Margaret Stewart (who married James Ogilvie of Balfour), Anne Scot, Margery Kirkcaldy, Coullombe, Barbara Sandilands (who married John Forbes), Barbara Kennedy (who married John Bellenden), Cassillis, Crespy, Crespanville, with the wife of the secretary John Bruce, Elizabeth Murray the wife of Alexander Durham, the daughter of Lady Livingston, and two female fools. When Margaret Hume was married in October 1555, Guise bought her a length of crimson velvet to be a gown.

A record of food at court, the 1549 "Bread Book", mentions a "mistress of the maidens", an equivalent to the English mother of the maids. The household included a female fool or jester, called Serat, who wore a red-and-yellow gown with a green skirt. Jane, or Jean, a dwarf, wore a light-purple velvet. The treasurer's accounts do not include detail of Guise's wardrobe expenses during her Regency (1554–1560), but in November 1557 she directed the burgh council of Edinburgh to exempt Archibald Dewar from taxes. He seems to have been of her tailors. Her French tailor Nicholas du Moncel and her embroiderer Henri Le Moyne later joined the service of Mary, Queen of Scots.

== Legacy ==
Apart from her bitter enemy John Knox, the leader of the Scottish Reformation, views by historians have generally been favourable. Marshall says that "her biographers, Strickland in the nineteenth century, McKerlie and Marshall in the twentieth, [have] been unanimous in praising her intelligence and fortitude" as have most other scholars. In evaluating her life, historian Rosalind K. Marshall says:

Sacrificing her own comfort, interests, and ultimately her life, Mary of Guise had fought a long, desperate, and, in the end, hopeless struggle to preserve Scotland as a pro-French, Roman Catholic nation for her daughter....Charming, highly intelligent, and hard-working, with a diplomatic manner and an ability to fight on regardless of hostility, disappointment, and ill health, Mary was never merely a pawn of the French king.

== Archival sources ==
A manuscript journal of the siege of Leith, attributed to Jacques de La Brosse, and copies of Mary of Guise's correspondence with the French ambassador Michel de Seure are held by the Archives des affaires étrangères, Paris, (Angleterre 15). This material, and an archive of letters known as the Balcarres Papers, held by the National Library of Scotland, possibly represent the papers of one of the secretaries of Mary of Guise, Pierre de Grantrie or Grandrye. The National Records of Scotland holds some state correspondence and exchequer material.

== Portrayal in fiction ==
- Marie de Guise is the principal character in The Five Year Queen by Janet Walkinshaw.
- Mary de Guise appears in volumes 1, 2, 3 and 5 of the Lymond Chronicles by Dorothy Dunnett. Most notably, the events around her visit to her daughter in France in 1550 are portrayed in the second volume, Queens' Play.
- In the 1998 film Elizabeth, Mary was played by the French actress Fanny Ardant. Her death was depicted as assassination at the hands of Francis Walsingham.
- In The CW series Reign, Amy Brenneman portrays Marie de Guise.

Mary of Guise House of Guise Cadet branch of the House of Lorraine Born: 22 November 1515 Died: 11 June 1560
Scottish royalty
Vacant Title last held by Madeleine of Valois	Queen consort of Scotland; 1538–1542	Vacant Title next held by Francis II of France as king consort
