= Cardinal of Lorraine =

Cardinal of Lorraine may refer to:

- Jean, Cardinal of Lorraine (1498–1550)
- Charles, Cardinal of Lorraine (1524–1574)
- Charles of Lorraine (bishop of Metz and Strasbourg) (1567–1607)
- Nicholas Francis, Duke of Lorraine, Cardinal 1626–34
