= Saint-Pierre-les-Dames, Reims =

Benedictine monastery of nuns in Reims, France, founded in the 7th century

Coordinates: 49.2526°N 4.0375°E

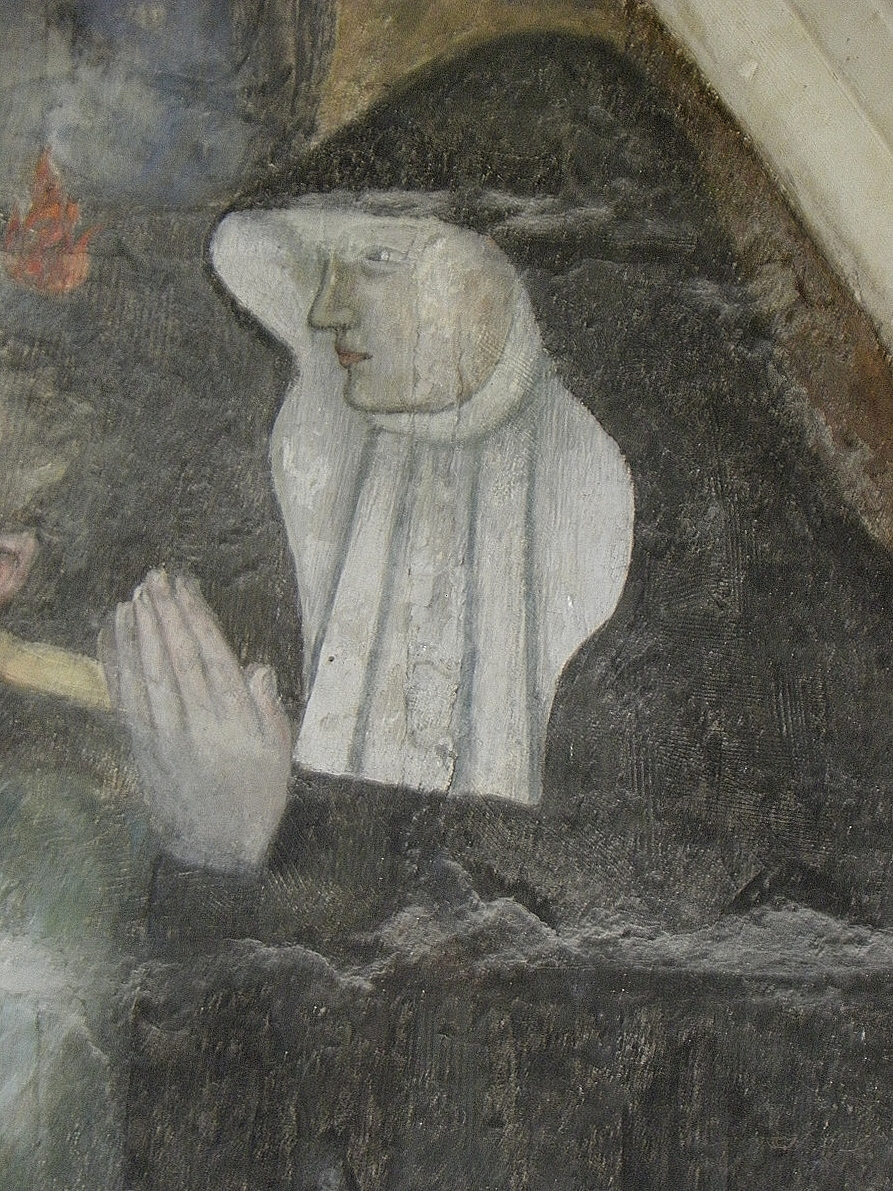
Renée de Lorraine, abbess 1546–1602

The Royal Abbey of Saint-Pierre-les-Dames (French: Abbaye royale de Saint-Pierre-les-Dames) was a monastery of Benedictine nuns established in the city of Reims for over a thousand years, from the early Middle Ages to the time of the French Revolution. The abbey was certainly in existence by the reign of Charlemagne, and according to some sources dated from as early as the 6th century, although it has been argued that the earlier date could be due to confusion with a different, short-lived monastery in the same city, also dedicated to St. Peter.

Renée de Lorraine (1522–1602), daughter of Claude, Duke of Guise, was abbess for 56 years, from 1546 to her death, throughout the French Wars of Religion. In 1560 her sister, Mary of Guise, mother of Mary, Queen of Scots, was buried in the abbey church. During the same year, Mary Queen of Scots herself spent some time in the abbey when mourning the death of her first husband, King Francis II of France, as well as her mother, and she donated his prayer book to the monastery library.
