= Charles, Cardinal of Lorraine =

French cardinal (1524–1574)

His Eminence Charles de Lorraine
- Cardinal, Archbishop of Reims
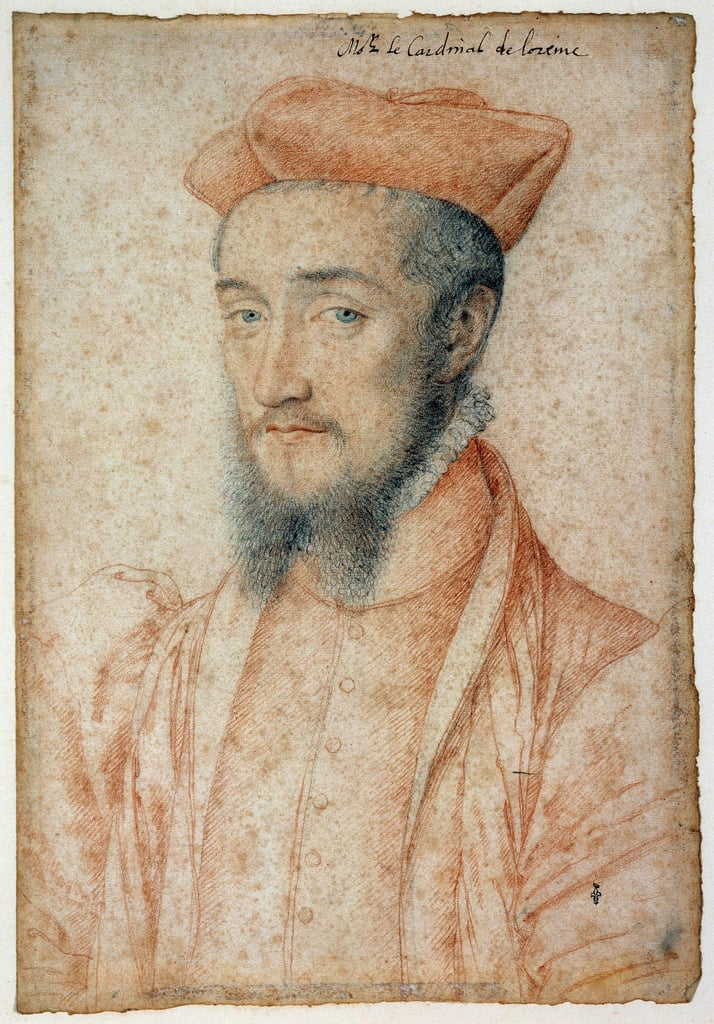
- Charles, Cardinal de Lorraine (1550) by François Clouet
- Archdiocese: Reims
- In office: 1538–1574
- Other post: Cardinal-priest of Sant'Apollinare 1555-1574
- Previous posts: Bishop of Metz 1550–1551; Coadjutor Bishop of Metz 1547–1550; Cardinal-priest of Santa Cecilia 1547–1555

Orders
- Consecration: 8 February 1545 by Claude de Longwy de Givry
- Created cardinal: 4 November 1547 by Pope Paul III
- Rank: Cardinal-priest

Personal details
- Born: 17 February 1524 Joinville, France
- Died: 25 December 1574 (aged 50) Avignon, France
- Coat of arms

Charles de Lorraine (17 February 1524 – 26 December 1574), Duke of Chevreuse, was a French cardinal and a member of the powerful House of Guise. He was known at first as the Cardinal of Guise, and then as the second Cardinal of Lorraine, after the death of his uncle, Jean, Cardinal of Lorraine (1550). He was the protector of François Rabelais and Pierre de Ronsard and founded Reims University. He is sometimes known as the Cardinal de Lorraine.

== Biography ==
Born in 1524, Joinville, Haute-Marne, Charles of Guise was the son of Claude, Duke of Guise and his wife Antoinette de Bourbon. His older brother was François, Duke of Guise. His sister Mary of Guise was the wife of King James V of Scotland and mother of Mary, Queen of Scots. King Francis I appointed him Archbishop of Reims in 1538.

== Cardinal ==
In a political move to draw France closer to the papacy, Pope Paul III created Charles cardinal in July 1547 (the day after the coronation of King Henry II of France, at which he had officiated). He became coadjutor for Bishop of Metz, his uncle Cardinal Jean de Lorraine, on 16 November 1547. Charles' uncle died on 10 May 1550 and he resigned and was succeeded as Administrator by Cardinal Robert de Lenoncourt.

The efforts of Charles to enforce his family's pretensions to the Countship of Provence, and his temporary assumption, with this object, of the title of Cardinal of Anjou were without success. He failed also when he attempted, in 1551, to dissuade Henry II from uniting the Duchy of Lorraine to France. Charles succeeded, however, in creating for his family interests certain political alliances that occasionally seemed in conflict with each other. He coquetted for instance on the one hand with the Lutheran princes of Germany, and on the other his interview (1558) with the Cardinal de Granvelle (at Péronne) initiated friendly relations between the Guises and the royal house of Spain.

In March 1558 de Pierceville wrote to Charles about building works and furnishing of the royal palaces, including the Louvre with tapestry and hangings of cloth of gold and cloth of silver. He wondered how the heraldry of the Cardinal's niece Mary, Queen of Scots and the Dauphin should be blazoned, and whether she had an open or imperial crown. The couple were married on 24 April 1558.

In 1562, he attended the Council of Trent. The seigneur de Lanssac, Arnaud du Ferrier, president of the Parlement of Paris, and Guy de Faur de Pibrac, royal counsellor, who represented Charles IX at the council from 26 May 1562, towards the end of the year were joined by the Cardinal Lorraine. He was instructed to arrive at an understanding with the Germans, who proposed to reform the church in head and members and to authorize at once Communion under Both Kinds, prayers in the vernacular and the marriage of the clergy.

In the reform articles which he presented (2 January 1563), he was silent on the last point, but petitioned for the other two. Pius IV was indignant, and the cardinal denounced Rome as the source of all abuses. In the questions of precedence which arose between him and the Spanish ambassador, Count de Luna, Pius IV decided for the latter. However, in September 1563, on a visit to Rome, the cardinal, intent perhaps on securing the pope's assistance for the political ambitions of the Guises, professed opinions less decidedly Gallican. Moreover, when he learned that the French ambassadors, who had left the council, were dissatisfied because the papal legates had obtained from the council approval of a project for the "reformation of the princes", which the latter deemed contrary to the liberties of the Catholic Church in France (the "Gallican church"), he endeavoured, though without success, to bring about the return of the ambassadors, prevailed on the legates to withdraw the objectionable articles and strove to secure the immediate publication in France of the decrees of the council; this, however, was refused by Catherine de' Medici.

When in 1564, François de Montmorency, royal governor of Paris and his personal enemy, attempted to prevent Charles from entering the capital with an armed escort, the ensuing conflict and the precipitate flight of Charles gave rise to an outcry of derision which obliged him to retire to his diocese for two years. In 1570, he aroused the anger of Charles IX by inducing Duke Henri, the eldest of his nephews, to solicit the hand of Margaret of Valois, the king's sister. His share in the negotiations for the marriage between Charles IX and Elizabeth of Austria, and for that of Margaret of Valois with the prince of Navarre, granted him temporary favour. Shortly after the death of Charles IX, the cardinal appeared before his successor, Henry III, but died soon afterwards, at Avignon.

== Legacy ==
As the Archbishop of Reims, Charles crowned successively Henry II, Francis II and Charles IX. He had a personal policy which was often at variance with that of the court. This policy rendered him at times an enigma to his contemporaries. The chronicler Pierre de L'Estoile accused Charles of great duplicity; Brantôme spoke of his "deeply stained soul, churchman though he was", accused him of skepticism and claimed to have heard him occasionally speak half approvingly of the Confession of Augsburg.

From 1560, at least twenty-two libelous pamphlets were in circulation and fell into Charles' hands; they damaged his reputation with posterity as well as among his contemporaries. One of them, "La Guerre Cardinale" (1565), accuses him of seeking to restore to the Holy Roman Empire the three former prince-bishoprics of Metz, Toul and Verdun, in Lorraine, which had been conquered by Henry II. A discourse attributed to Théodore de Bèze (1566) denounced the pluralism of the cardinal in the matter of benefices. He established Reims University and served as François Rabelais and Pierre de Ronsard's guardian.

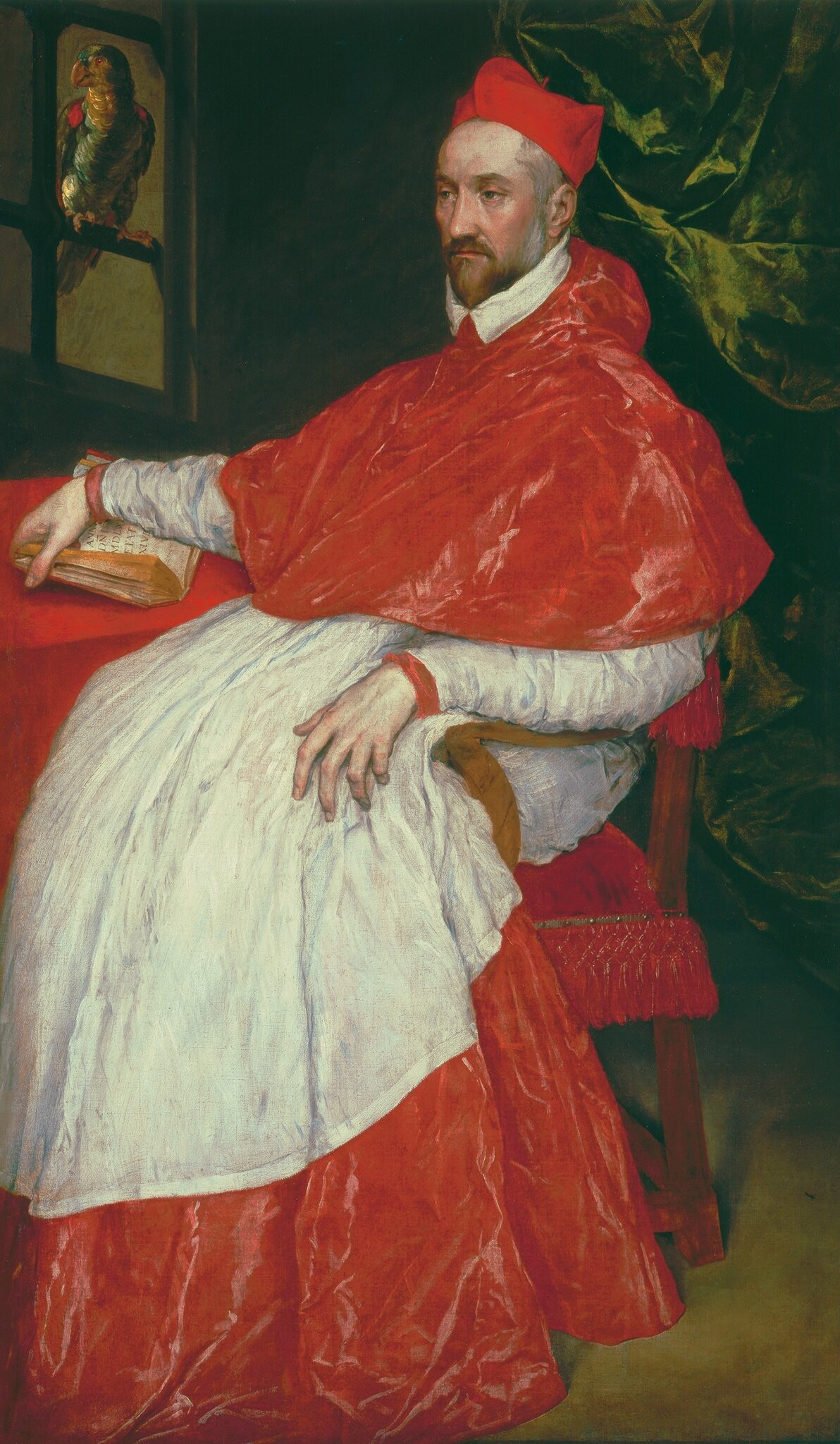
Portrait of Charles of Guise by El Greco.

== Sources ==
- Carroll, Stuart (2009). Martyrs and Murderers: The Guise Family and the Making of Europe. Oxford University Press.
- Konnert, Mark W. (2016). Local Politics in the French Wars of Religion: The Towns of Champagne, the Duc de Guise, and the Catholic League, 1560-95. Routledge.
- Knecht, R. J. (2014). Catherine de'Medici. Taylor & Francis.
- Wellman, Kathleen (2013). Queens and Mistresses of Renaissance France. Yale University Press.

Catholic Church titles
Preceded by Jean IV of Lorraine	Archbishop of Reims; 1538–1574	Succeeded by Louis II, Cardinal of Guise
Preceded by Jean IV of Lorraine	Bishop of Metz; 1550–1551	Succeeded by Robert de Lenoncourt
Preceded by Jean IV of Lorraine	Abbot of Cluny; 1550–1574	Succeeded by Claude de Guise
French nobility
Preceded by Jean	Duc de Chevreuse; 1555–1574	Succeeded by Charles
