= House of Guise =

French noble family

House of Guise Maison de Guise
- Noble house
- Coat of arms of Claude of Lorraine
- Parent house: House of Lorraine
- Country: France
- Founded: 1528; 497 years ago
- Founder: Claude of Lorraine
- Final ruler: Marie of Lorraine (Guise) Charles de Lorraine, Count of Armagnac (Guise-Armagnac) Charles Eugene, Prince of Lambesc (Guise-Elbeuf)
- Titles: Duke of Guise; Duke of Chevreuse; Duke of Mayenne; Duke of Joyeuse; Count/Duke of Aumale; Lord/Marquis/Duke of Elbeuf; Queen of Scotland; Count of Armagnac
- Motto: Dederit'ne viam casus've Deus've (Shall chance or God provide the path?)
- Dissolution: 1688; 338 years ago (Guise) 1751; 275 years ago (Guise-Armagnac) 1825; 201 years ago (Guise-Elbeuf)
- Cadet branches: Guise-Armagnac

The House of Guise (/ɡwiːz/, French: [ɡ(ɥ)iz]; Dutch: Wieze; German: Wiese) was a prominent French noble family that was involved heavily in the French Wars of Religion. The House of Guise was the founding house of the Principality of Joinville.

== Origin ==
The House of Guise was founded as a cadet branch of the House of Lorraine by Claude of Lorraine (1496–1550), who entered French service and was made the first Duke of Guise by King Francis I in 1527. The family's high rank was not due to possession of the Guise dukedom but to their membership in a sovereign dynasty, which procured for them the rank of prince étranger at the royal court of France. Claude's daughter Mary of Guise (1515–1560) married King James V of Scotland and was mother of Mary, Queen of Scots. Claude's eldest son, Francis, became the second Duke of Guise at his father's death on 12 April 1550 and became a military hero thanks to his defense of Metz in 1552 and the capture of Calais from the English in 1558, while another son, Charles, became Archbishop of Reims and a Cardinal in the Catholic Church.

== French Wars of Religion ==
In 1558, the Dauphin Francis married Mary, Queen of Scots. When the young man became king after his father's death in 1559, the queen's uncles, the Duke of Guise and his brother the Cardinal of Lorraine, controlled French politics during his short reign.

In March 1560, opposition to the Guise government coalesced into a conspiracy, led by La Renaudie with support from the Bourbon Prince de Condé. Having been made aware of it, the Guise family were able to crush the conspiracy before the king could be seized. The Guise would take the opportunity of the conspiracy to reorient the Crown's religious policy by scaling down the persecution of the last 10 years for a new policy of no toleration and no persecution with the eventual hope the two sects would reunify. Still incensed at his involvement in Amboise, the Guise called the Prince of Condé to them and oversaw a quick trial to establish his guilt, only for the death of Francis II and the succession of Charles IX to sever their links to the government. With Catherine assuming the regency for her young son, the Guise departed court and set themselves up in opposition to her toleration policy in alliance with their rival the Montmorency. In 1562, Catherine would promulgate the Edict of Saint-Germain. Francis returned to court so that he might oppose it, on his way, his retinue massacred a Protestant congregation at Wassy. In response, Condé went into open rebellion and thus started the French Wars of Religion.

Duke Francis helped to defeat the Huguenots at the Battle of Dreux (19 December 1562), but he was assassinated at the Siege of Orleans on 24 February 1563 while he was seeking a final victory. His son, Henry, inherited his titles; and under the direction of his uncle Charles began a campaign to accuse Admiral Coligny of orchestrating his fathers assassination. Charles meanwhile led the French delegation at the Council of Trent, converting to the Papal line in 1563. In 1564, no longer permitted to continue his feud with Coligny through legal channels, he and his uncle Charles, Cardinal of Lorraine would attempt to make a show of force by entering Paris, but their entry ended with both besieged in their residence and forced to concede.

In 1566, the crown forced Charles at Moulins to make the kiss of peace with Coligny to end their feud, but Henry refused to attend. He would also challenge Coligny and Anne de Montmorency to duels, but they rebuffed his attempts. No longer welcome at court, he and his brother Charles, Duke of Mayenne decided to crusade against the Ottoman Empire in Hungary. In September 1568, he reached his majority, just as Charles returned to the centre of French politics with his readmission to the Privy Council. No sooner had he returned to the council than he began leading the war party to break off the Peace of Longjumeau, which would be annulled shortly thereafter and started the Third French War of religion. He would fight at Jarnac, Moncontour and defend Poitiers from a siege by Coligny. By the termination of the third war, the Guise would once more find themselves in disgrace from court due both to their hawkish policy and Henry's affair with Margaret de Valois.

Having returned to favour, Henry helped plan the assassination of Coligny, the final culmination of his feud that would spiral into the St. Bartholomew's Day Massacre of the Huguenots in 1572. In 1576, frustrated with the Politiques' direction of the government of Henri III, Guise would be instrumental in the formation of the Catholic League. The death of the royal heir presumptive, Francis, Duke of Anjou, in 1584, which made the Protestant King Henry of Navarre the heir to the French throne, led to a new civil war, the War of the Three Henries, with King Henry III of France, Henry of Navarre and Henry of Guise fighting for control of France. Guise began the war by declaring the unacceptability of Navarre as King of France and controlled the powerful Catholic League, which soon forced the French king to follow in his wake. In 1588 Guise, with Spanish support, instigated a revolt against the king, took control of the city of Paris and became the de facto ruler of France.

After an apparent reconciliation between the French king and the Duke, King Henry III had both the Duke of Guise and his brother, Louis of Lorraine, Cardinal of Guise (1555–1588), murdered in December 1588 during a meeting in the Royal Chateau at Blois. The leadership of the Catholic League fell to their brother, Charles of Lorraine, Duke of Mayenne, the commander of the armed forces of the Catholic League.

The Duke of Mayenne's nephew, the young Duke of Guise, Charles, was proposed by the Catholic League as a candidate for the throne, possibly through a marriage to Philip II of Spain's daughter Isabella, the granddaughter of Henry II of France. The Catholic League was eventually defeated, but for the sake of the country, King Henry IV became a Catholic and bought peace with Mayenne, and in January 1596, a treaty was signed that put an end to the League.

== Decline from prominence ==
After this, the House of Guise receded from its prominent position in French politics, and the senior line, that of the Dukes of Guise, became extinct in 1688. The vast estates and title were disputed and diverted by various relatives although several junior branches of the family (Dukes of Mayenne, Dukes of Elbeuf etc.) perpetuated the male line until 1825.

Their principal title, Duke de Guise, was awarded to a branch of the House of Bourbon in 1688 and afterwards to the House of Orléans. The title, with one exception, was not used by pretenders to throne of France, who were overthrown by the French Revolution of 1848. One of House of Guise's heads, Prince Jean, Duke of Guise (1874–1940) nonetheless took it as his title of pretence to the former crown of France and was supported by some of the 19th century Orleanist activists. They formed for at the time the junior set of Legitimists, who are claimants to be senior descendants of the pre-1848 French royal family and have been supported by restorative movements before, during and after the Second French Empire of Emperor Napoleon III, the last undoubted monarch of France. By the end of the 1880s, a series of republican Presidents during the relatively new French Third Republic largely ended any hope of a restored monarchy.

== Dukes of Guise ==
See Duke of Guise for a list. See Duchess of Guise for a list of their wives.

== Other members of the House of Guise ==
- Charles, Cardinal of Lorraine
- Louis I, Cardinal of Guise
- Louis II, Cardinal of Guise
- Louis III, Cardinal of Guise
- René, Marquis of Elbeuf
- Charles I, Duke of Elbeuf
- Charles II, Duke of Elbeuf
- Claude, Duke of Chevreuse
- Claude, Duke of Aumale
- Charles, Duke of Mayenne
- Mary of Guise
- Catherine de Lorraine (1552–1596)

== Male-line family tree ==
Male, male-line, legitimate, non-morganatic members of the house who either lived to adulthood, or who held a title as a child, are included. Heads of the house are in bold.

- **Claude, Duke of Guise**, 1496–1550, founder of the House of Guise
  - **Francis, Duke of Guise**, 1519–1563
    - **Henry I, Duke of Guise**, 1550–1588
      - **Charles, Duke of Guise**, 1571–1640
        - Francis, Prince of Joinville, 1612–1639
        - **Henry II, Duke of Guise**, 1614–1664
        - Charles Louis, Duke of Joyeuse, 1618–1637
        - Louis, Duke of Joyeuse, 1622–1654
          - **Louis Joseph, Duke of Guise**, 1650–1671
            - **Francis Joseph, Duke of Guise**, 1670–1675
        - Roger, a knight, 1624–1653
      - Louis III, Cardinal of Guise, 1575–1621
      - Claude, Duke of Chevreuse, 1578–1657
      - Francis Alexander, a knight, 1589–1614
    - Charles, Duke of Mayenne, 1554–1611
      - Henry of Lorraine, Duke of Mayenne, 1578–1621
      - Charles Emmanuel of Lorraine, Count of Sommerive, 1581–1609
    - Louis II of Lorraine, Cardinal of Guise, 1555–1588
  - Charles, Cardinal of Lorraine, 1524–1574
  - Claude, Duke of Aumale, 1526–1573
    - Charles, Duke of Aumale, 1555–1631
    - Claude of Lorraine, knight of Aumale, 1564–1591
  - Louis I of Lorraine, Cardinal of Guise, 1527–1578
  - Francis of Lorraine, Grand Prior, 1534–1563
  - René II of Lorraine, Marquis of Elbeuf, 1536–1566
    - Charles I, Duke of Elbeuf, 1556–1605
      - Charles II, Duke of Elbeuf, 1596–1657
        - **Charles III, Duke of Elbeuf**, 1620–1692
          - Charles of Lorraine, knight of Elboeuf, 1650–1690
          - **Henry, Duke of Elbeuf**, 1661–1748
            - Philip of Lorraine, Prince of Elbeuf, 1678–1705
            - Charles of Lorraine, 1685–1705
          - Louis of Lorraine, Abbot of Orcamp, 1662–1693
          - **Emmanuel Maurice, Duke of Elbeuf**, 1677–1763
        - Henry, Abbot of Hombieres, 1622–1648
        - Francis Louis, Count of Harcourt, 1623–1694
          - Alphonse Henri, Count of Harcourt, 1648–1718
            - Francis-Mary of Lorraine, Count of Maubec, 1686–1706
            - Francis of Lorraine, Prince of Montlaur, 1684–1705
          - Cesar of Lorraine, Prince of Montlaur, 1650–1675
          - Charles of Lorraine, Abbé of Harcourt, 1661–1683
        - Francis-Mary, Prince of Lillebonne, 1624–1694
          - Charles, Prince of Commercy, 1661–1702
          - John Paul of Lorraine, 1672–1693
      - Henry, Count of Harcourt, 1601–1666
        - Louis, Count of Armagnac, 1641–1718
          - Henry, Count of Brionne, 1661–1713
            - Louis, Prince of Lambesc, 1692–1743
              - Louis, Prince of Brionne, 1725–1761
                - **Charles Eugene, Prince of Lambesc**, 1751–1825
                - Joseph Louis, Prince of Lorraine-Vaudémont, 1759–1812
          - Francis Armand of Lorraine, Abbot of Royaumont, 1665–1728
          - Camille of Lorraine, Count of Chamilly, 1666–1715
          - Louis Alphonse of Lorraine, bailiff of Armagnac, 1675–1704
          - Charles of Lorraine, Count of Armagnac, 1684–1751
        - Philip, Knight of Lorraine, 1643–1702
        - Alphonse Louis of Lorraine, Abbot of Royaumont, 1644–1689
        - Raymond Berenger of Lorraine, Abbot of Faron de Meaux, 1647–1686
        - Charles, Count of Marsan, 1648–1708
          - Charles Louis, Count of Marsan, 1696–1755
            - Gaston, Count of Marsan, 1721–1743
            - Camille, Prince of Marsan, 1725–1780
          - James Henry of Lorraine, Knight of Lorraine, 1698–1734

== See also ==
- Legitimists
