= Reims University (1548–1793) =

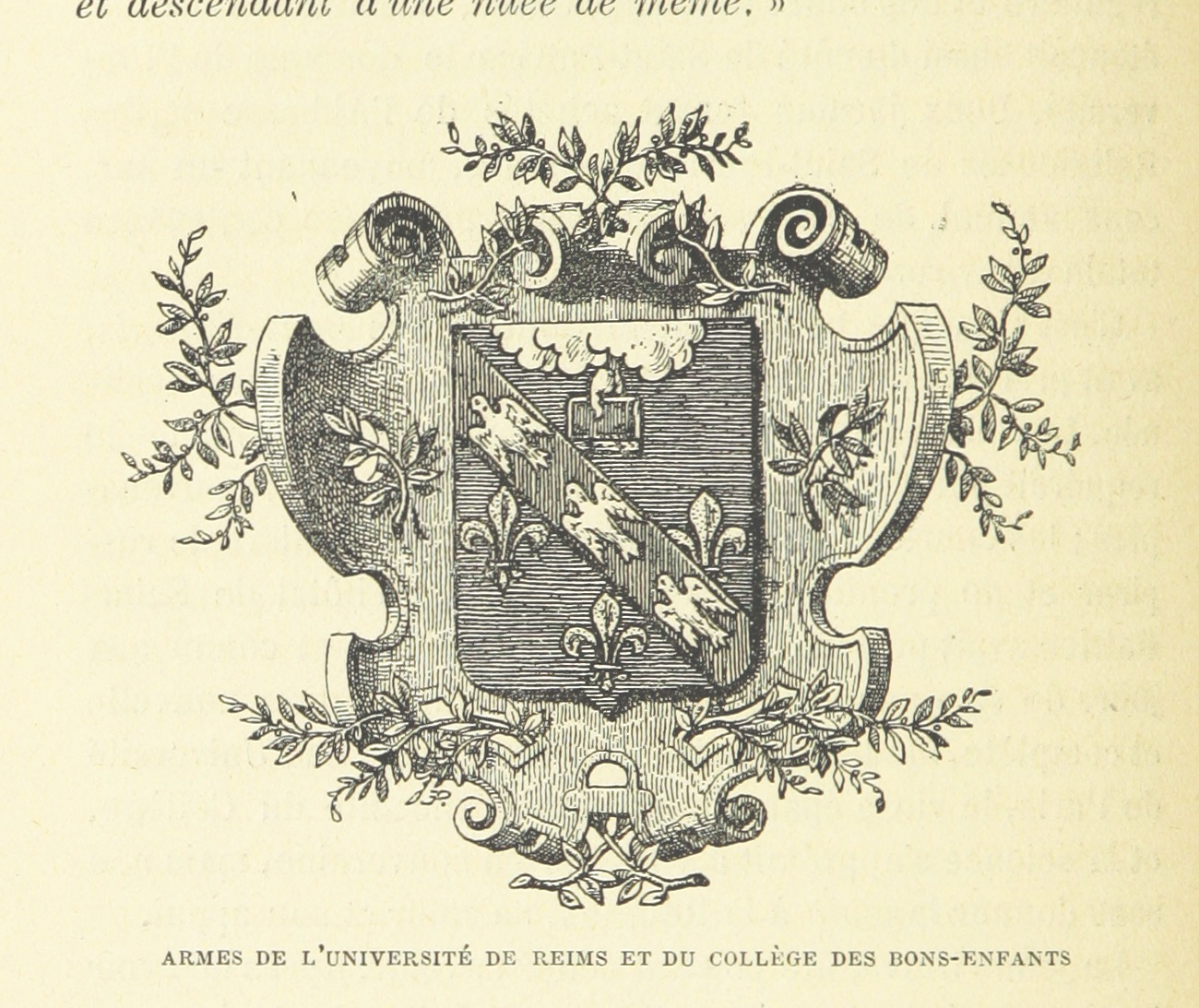
Blason

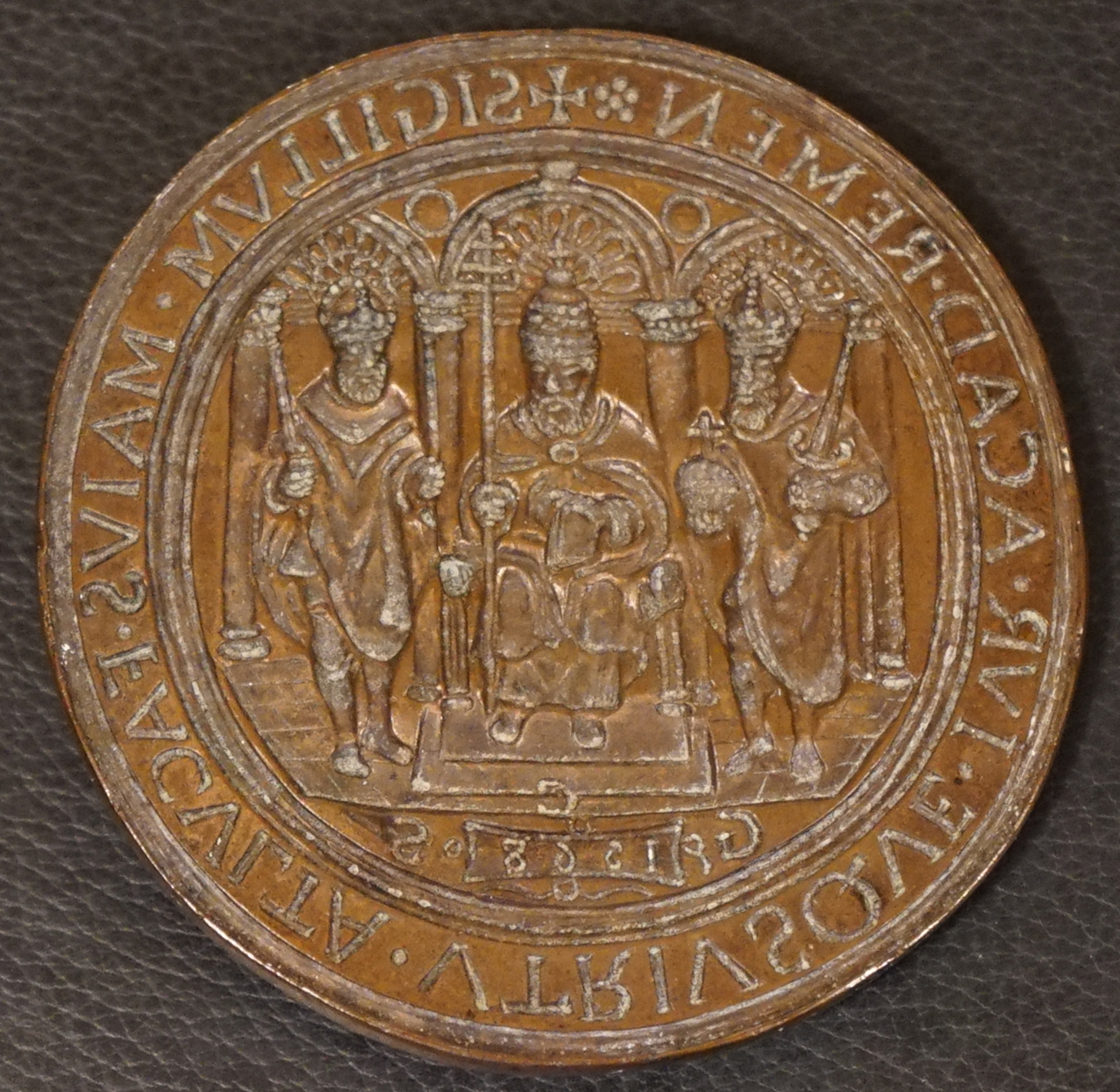
Seal

Reims University (French: Université de Reims or Rheims) was a public university in Reims, France. It was one of the largest and most prestigious universities in Europe during the early modern era. It was established in 1548 by papal bull, but shut down in 1793 during the French Revolution. Its successor, the University of Reims Champagne-Ardenne, was officially established in 1967.

== See also ==
- List of early modern universities in Europe
