= Justice Ayre =

Justice Ayre was a judicial circuit north and south of the River Forth in Scotland through the mainly English speaking areas.

The justiciar traveled this circuit to conduct criminal trials and other legal proceedings. This was a function of the Court of Justiciary.

Before each tour, the justiciar would order the local sheriff to serve indictments on the accused individuals. The sheriff was also responsible for ensuring that the accused showed up for trial, along with the jurors and the witnesses. .

== Sources ==
- Macfarlane, Lesley J. (1995), William Elphinstone and The Kingdom of Scotland, 1431–1514, Aberdeen: Aberdeen University Press, ISBN 1-857522559
- McNeil, Peter G. B.; MacQueen, Hector L. (1998). An Atlas of Scottish History to 1707 (2 ed.). Edinburgh: University of Edinburgh. p. 211. ISBN 978-0950390413.
