= François, Duke of Guise =

French soldier and politician (1519–1563)

François de Lorraine
- Duke of Aumale; Prince de Joinville; Duke of Guise
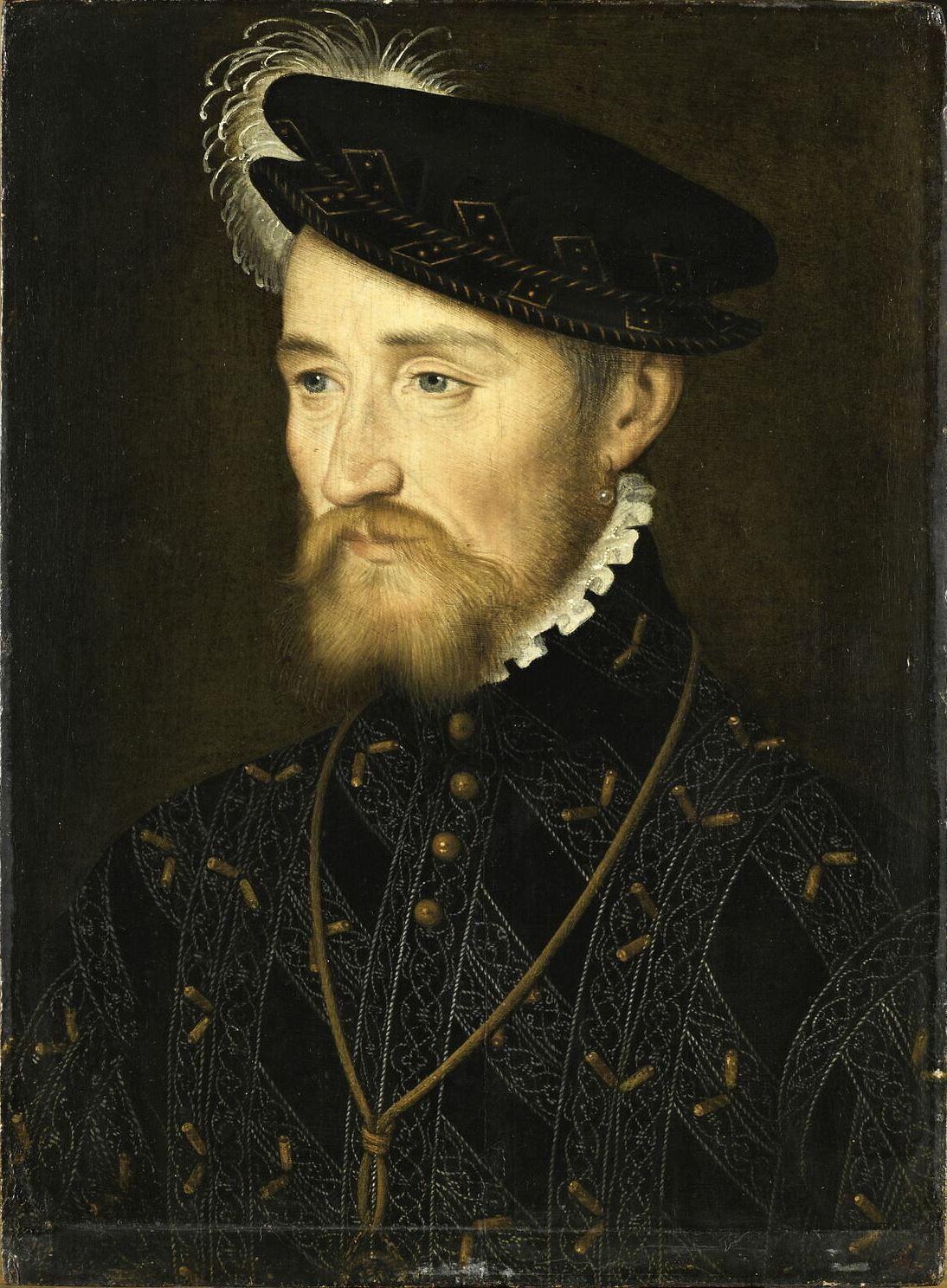
- Portrait by François Clouet, c. 1550–1560

Duke of Guise
- Tenure: 12 April 1550 – 24 February 1563
- Predecessor: Claude
- Successor: Henri I
- Born: 17 February 1519; Bar-le-Duc, Lorraine, Holy Roman Empire
- Died: 24 February 1563 (aged 44) near Orléans, France
- Spouse: Anna d'Este (m. 1548)
- Issue: Henri I, Duke of Guise; Catherine; Charles, Duke of Mayenne; Louis II de Lorraine, cardinal de Guise; François
- House: Guise
- Father: Claude, Duke of Guise
- Mother: Antoinette de Bourbon

François de Lorraine, 2nd Duke of Guise, 1st Prince of Joinville, and 1st Duke of Aumale (17 February 1519 – 24 February 1563), was a French general and statesman. A prominent leader during the Italian War of 1551–1559 and French Wars of Religion, he was assassinated during the siege of Orleans in 1563.

== Early life ==
Born in Bar-le-Duc (Lorraine), François was the son of Claude de Lorraine (created Duke of Guise in 1527), and his wife Antoinette de Bourbon. His sister, Mary of Guise, was the wife of King James V of Scotland and mother of Mary, Queen of Scots. His younger brother was Charles, Cardinal of Lorraine. He was the youthful cousin of Henry II of France, with whom he was raised, and by birth a prominent individual in France, though his detractors emphasised his "foreign" origin (he was a prince étranger), namely the Duchy of Lorraine.

In 1545, Guise (he is henceforth referred to by his title) was seriously wounded at the Second Siege of Boulogne, but recovered. He was struck with a lance through the bars of his helmet. The steel head pierced both cheeks, and 15 cm (6 in) of the shaft were snapped off by the violence of the blow. He sat firm in his saddle, and rode back unassisted to his tent; and when the surgeon thought he would die of pain, when the iron was extracted, 'he bore it as easily as if it had been but the plucking of a hair out of his head.' The scar would earn him the nickname "Le Balafré" ("The Scarred One").

In 1548 he married Anna d'Este, in a magnificent wedding. She was the daughter of Duke Ercole II d'Este of Ferrara and Princess Renée de France, daughter of King Louis XII.

== Military career ==
An engraving of the Duke of Guise

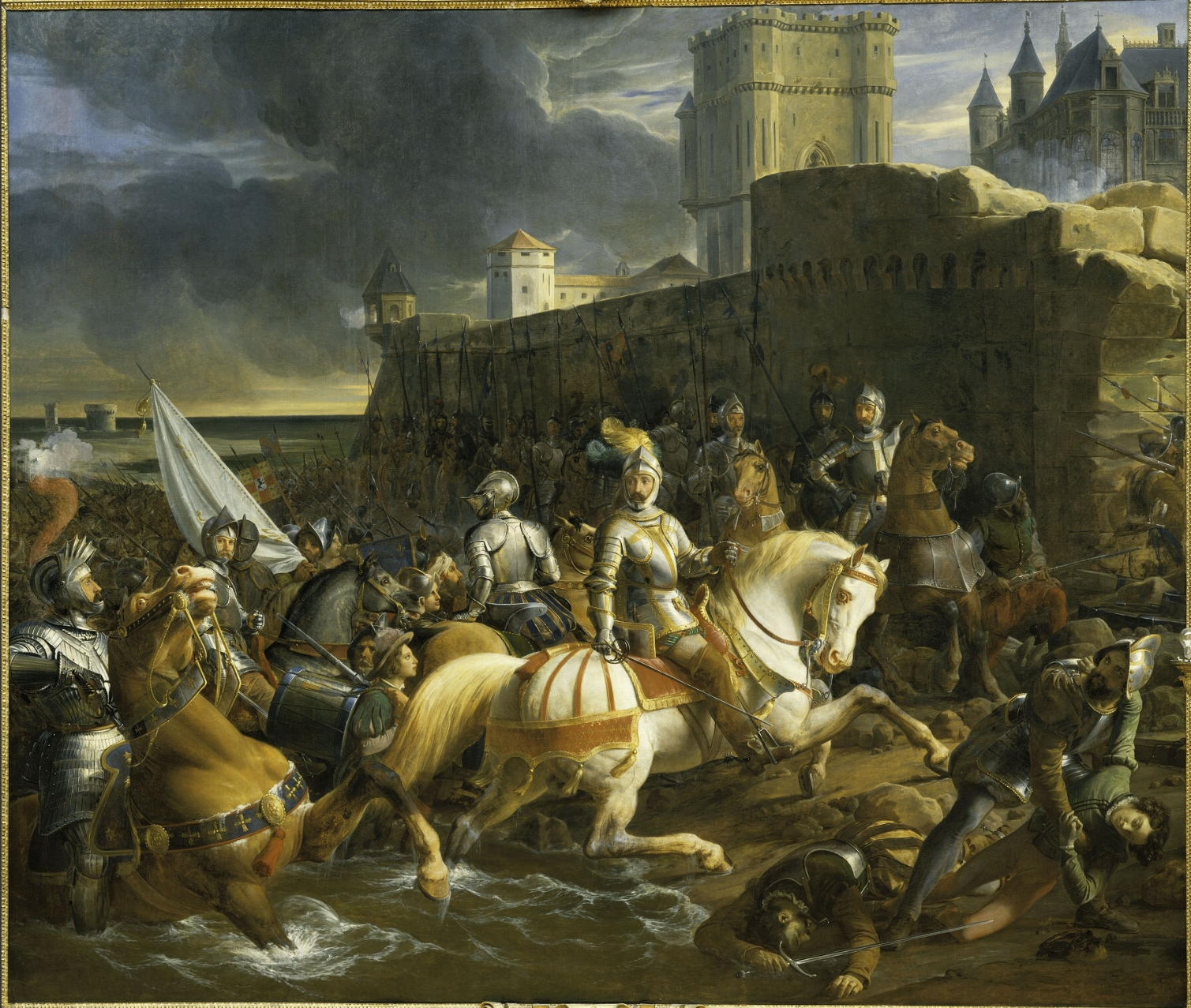
The Siege of Calais by François-Édouard Picot. The Duke of Guise at the Siege of Calais in 1558

In 1551, he was created Grand Chamberlain of France. He won international renown in 1552 when he successfully defended the city of Metz from the forces of Charles V, Holy Roman Emperor, and defeated the imperial troops again at the Battle of Renty in 1554. but the Truce of Vaucelles temporarily curtailed his military activity.

He led an army into Italy in 1557 to aid Pope Paul IV, operating in conjunction with Brissac to capture Valenza. There they parted ways. Guise continued east along the Po Valley with 16,000 men. Under instructions to take Parma, he assessed that as unfeasible, and instead proposed attacking Florence to secure lines south. The duke of Tuscany, fearing such a possibility, diplomatically reached out to Henry II and Guise was informed of the negotiations.

Advancing into Naples in April, his troops became restless from lack of pay. Hearing reports that the Duke of Alba was marching along the Adriatic coast with an army of 18,000 aiming to cut his supply, Guise sought battle, but Alba was evasive. Guise turned towards Campli and devastated it, and followed besieging the strategic city of Civitella. However, the siege was unsuccessful, and upon the arrival of Alba with a reinforced army of 25,000, Guise retreated out of Naples.

As Alba and Marcantonio Colonna marched towards Rome, Guise moved to reinforce the city. However, Guise was now instructed by king Henry to break off his Naples campaign and return to his campaign in Lombardy. This order in turn was superseded by the disastrous defeat of Montmorency at the Battle of St. Quentin.

Guise was recalled to France, and hurriedly made Lieutenant-General. Taking the field, he captured Calais from the English on 7 January 1558—an enormous propaganda victory for France—then Thionville and Arlon that summer, and was preparing to advance into Luxembourg when the Peace of Cateau-Cambrésis was signed. Throughout the reign of Henry II, Guise was one of the premier military figures of France, courteous, affable, and frank, and largely popular, the "grand duc de Guise" as his contemporary Brantôme called him. (Note: who distinguishes the personal admiration for François, shared by Catherine, from the detestation of les Guises as a faction, led by the brilliant and devious cardinal, whom even the Spanish mistrusted.)

The accession of Francis II of France (10 July 1559), husband of Guise's niece Mary, Queen of Scots, was a triumph for the Guise family. Montmorency, conscious there was no place for him in the new order, withdrew from court. The Duke of Guise and his brother, Charles, Cardinal of Lorraine were supreme in the royal council. (Note: "It is impossible to distinguish the duke's political role from that of his brother, the cardinal.") Occasionally he signed public acts in the royal manner, with his baptismal name only.

== The Wars of Religion ==
François I de Lorraine, Duc de Guise by Marc Duval.

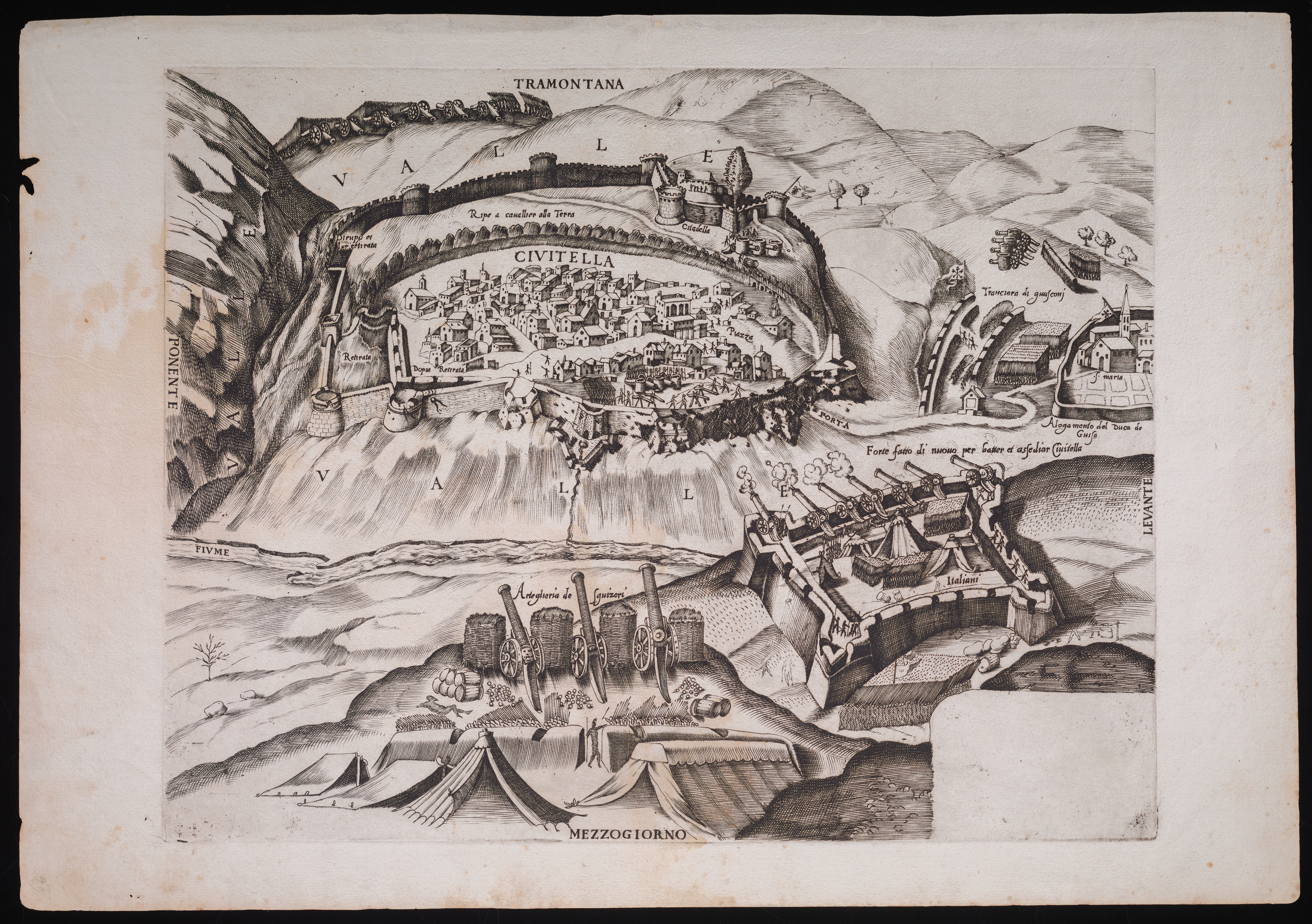
Plan of the siege of Civitella del Tronto

In reaction to the dominating power at court of the Catholic Guises, La Renaudie, a Protestant gentleman of Périgord, perhaps with the indirect encouragement of Louis of Bourbon, Prince of Condé, organised a palace coup, the conspiracy of Amboise, to seize the person of the Duke of Guise and his brother Charles, the Cardinal of Lorraine. When the ill-organised plot was put off for six days, it was discovered by the court well ahead of time. On 12 March 1560, the Huguenots stormed the Château d'Amboise, to which the Guises had moved the young king and queen for safety. The uprising was violently suppressed, with 1,200 executed, many within sight of the castle. In the immediate aftermath Condé was obliged to flee the court, and the power of the Guises was supreme. The discourse which Coligny, leader of the Huguenots, pronounced against les Guises in the Assembly of Notables at Fontainebleau (August 1560), did not influence King Francis II in the least, but resulted rather in the imprisonment of Condé, at Charles's behest.

However, the king died on 5 December 1560, making Mary, Queen of Scots a widow, and of little political importance in France. The Guises lost status alongside her, thus making a year full of calamity for the Guises both in Scotland and France. Within a year and a half, their influence waxed great and waned. After the accession of Charles IX, the Duke of Guise lived in retirement on his estates.

The regent, Catherine de' Medici, was at first inclined to favour the Protestants. To defend the Catholic cause, the Duke of Guise, together with his old enemy, the Constable de Montmorency and the Maréchal de Saint-André formed the so-called triumvirate opposed to the policy of concessions which Catherine de' Medici attempted to inaugurate in favour of the Protestants. His former military hero's public image was changing: "he could not serve for long as the military executive of this extreme political, ultra-montane, pro-Spanish junta without attracting his share of odium," N. M. Sutherland has observed in describing the lead-up to his assassination.

The plan of the Triumvirate was to treat with Habsburg Spain and the Holy See, and also to come to an understanding with the Lutheran princes of Germany to induce them to abandon the idea of covertly backing the French Protestants. About July 1561, Guise wrote to this effect to the Duke of Württemberg. The Colloquy at Poissy (September and October 1561) between theologians of the two confessions was fruitless, and the conciliation policy of Catherine de' Medici was defeated. From 15 to 18 February 1562, Guise visited the Duke of Württemberg at Saverne, and convinced him that if the conference at Poissy had failed, the fault was that of the Calvinists.

As Guise passed through Wassy-sur-Blaise on his way to Paris (1 March 1562), a massacre of Protestants took place. It is not known to what extent he was responsible for this, but the Massacre of Vassy kindled open military conflict in the French Wars of Religion. The siege of Bourges in September was the opening episode, then Rouen was retaken from the Protestants by Guise after a month's siege (October); the Battle of Dreux (19 December), at which Montmorency was taken prisoner and Saint-André slain, was in the end turned by Guise to the advantage of the Catholic cause, and Condé, leader of the Huguenots, was taken prisoner.

== Assassination ==
In the fourth encounter, Guise was about to take Orléans from the Huguenot supporters of Condé when he was wounded on 18 February 1563 by the Huguenot assassin, Jean de Poltrot de Méré, and died six days later, bled to death by his surgeons, at Château Corney.

It was not the first plot against his life. A hunting accident — Guise had been appointed Grand Veneur of France in 1556 — had been planned, as Sir Nicholas Throckmorton informed Queen Elizabeth I of England in May 1560, but the plot was divulged by one of the conspirators who lost his nerve and his five co-conspirators fled.

Guise's unexpected death temporarily interrupted open hostilities. In his testimony, Poltrot implicated Coligny and the Protestant pastor Théodore de Bèze. Though the assassin later retracted his statement and Coligny denied responsibility for Guise's death, a bitter feud arose between Guise's son Henry and Coligny, which culminated in the St Bartholomew's Day massacre.

== Family ==
Guise married Anna d'Este, daughter of Ercole II d'Este, Duke of Ferrara, and Renée of France, in Saint-Germain-en-Laye on 29 April 1548. They had:

1. Henri (1550–1588), who succeeded him as Duke of Guise.
2. Catherine (18 July 1551, Joinville – 6 May 1596, Paris), married on 4 February 1570 Louis, Duke of Montpensier
3. Charles, Duke of Mayenne (1554–1611)
4. Louis II de Lorraine, cardinal de Guise (1555–1588), Archbishop of Reims
5. Antoine (25 April 1557 – 16 January 1560) died in early childhood.
6. François (31 December 1559, Blois – 24 October 1573, Reims) died young without issue.
7. Maximilien (25 October 1562) died at birth.
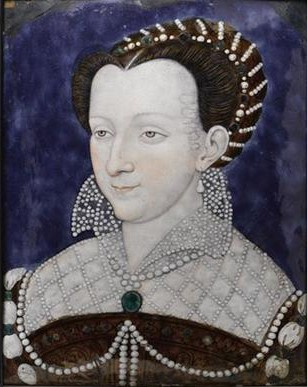
Anne d'Este

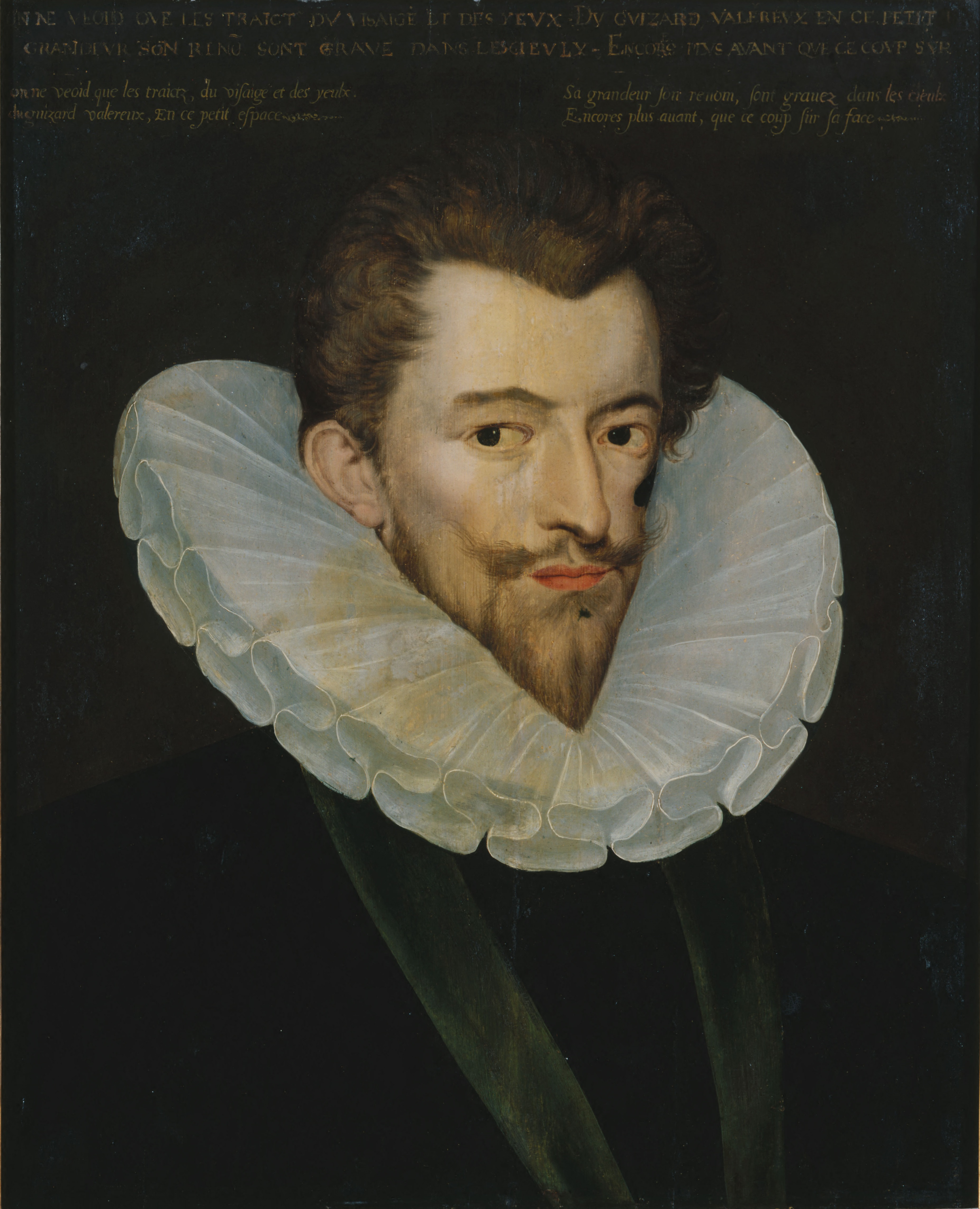
Duke Henry I of Guise

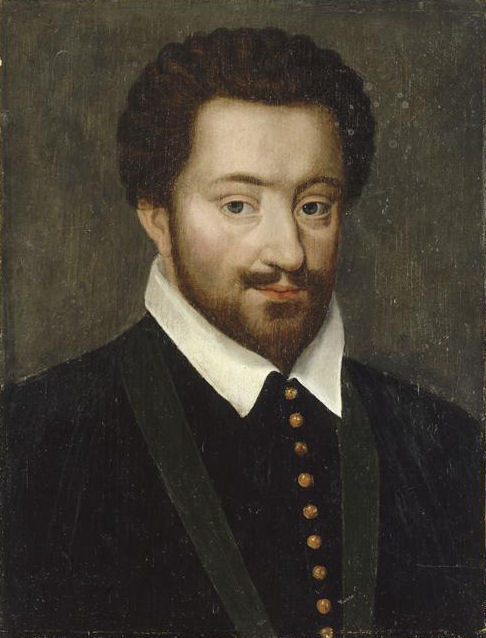
Duke Charles of Mayenne

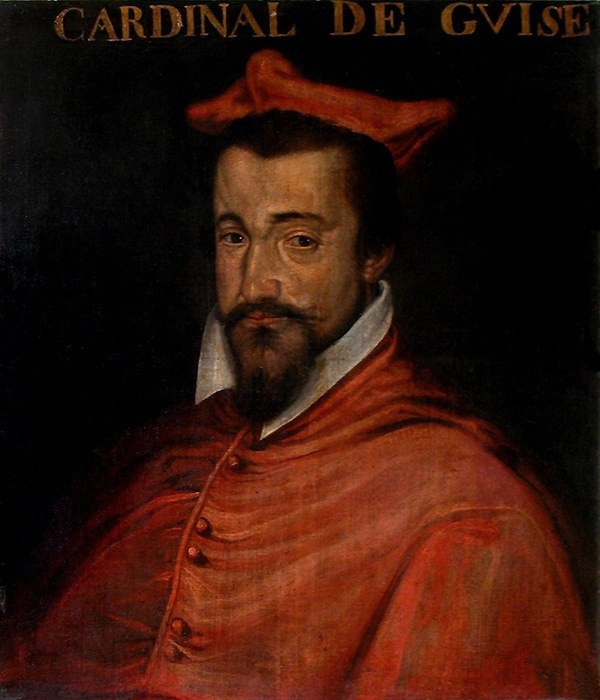
Cardinal Louis of Guise

== See also ==
- House of Guise

== Sources ==
- Carroll, Stuart (2011). Martyrs and Murderers: The Guise Family and the Making of Europe. Oxford University Press. ISBN 9780191619700.
- Durot, Éric (2008). "François de Lorraine (1520–1563), duc de Guise et nouveau Roi Mage". Histoire, Économie & Société. 54 (3): 3–16. doi:10.3917/hes.083.0003. online.
- Durot, Éric (2012). François de Lorraine, duc de Guise, entre Dieu et le roi. Classiques Garnier. Presentation online. Review in Cahiers de Recherches Médiévales et Humanistes. Review in Revue d’histoire moderne & contemporaine.
- Knecht, R.J. (1989). The French Wars of Religion, 1559–1598. Longman Group. ISBN 9780582354562.
- Knecht, Robert (2010). The French Wars of Religion, 1559-1598. Routledge. ISBN 9781317862314.
- Knecht, R.J. (2016). Hero or Tyrant? Henry III, King of France, 1574–89. Routledge. ISBN 9781317122142.
- Patterson, Benton (2013). With the Heart of a King: Elizabeth I of England, Philip II of Spain, and the Fight for a Nation's Soul and Crown. St. Martin Press. ISBN 9781466858848.
- Mallett, Michael; Shaw, Christine (2014). The Italian Wars 1494–1559: War, State and Society in Early Modern Europe. Routledge. ISBN 9781317899389.
- Sutherland, N. M. (1981). "The Assassination of François Duc de Guise, February 1563". The Historical Journal. 24, June (2). Cambridge University Press: 279–295. doi:10.1017/S0018246X00005471. S2CID 159857086.
- Johnson, C. Curtiss; Bongard, David L. (1992). "Francois de Lorraine, 2nd Duke of Guise". In Dupuy, Trevor N.; Johnson, Curt; Bongard, David L. (eds.). The Harper Encyclopedia of Military Biography. Castle Books. ISBN 9789716094299.

French nobility
Preceded by elevated from County by courtesy	Duke of Aumale; 1547–1550	Succeeded by Claude
Preceded by Claude	Duke of Guise; 1550–1563	Succeeded by Henry I
Preceded by elevated from Barony	Prince of Joinville; 1552–1563	Succeeded by Henry I
