= List of consorts of Elbeuf =

The following is a List of consorts of Elbeuf. Elbeuf is a commune in the Seine-Maritime department in the Normandy region in northern France.

== Baroness of Elbeuf ==
=== House of Harcourt, 1265–1419 ===
Picture	Name	Father	Birth	Marriage	Became Baroness	Ceased to be Baroness	Death	Spouse
	Alix de Beaumont	Jean de Beaumont (Beaumont)	-	before 1240	1265 became Baroness	4 October 1275		John I of Harcourt
	Agnes of Lorraine	Frederick III, Duke of Lorraine (Lorraine)	-	-	5 November 1288 husband's accession	-		John II of Harcourt
	Joan, Viscountess of Châtellerault	Aimery II, Viscount of Châtellerault	-	1275		21 December 1302 husband's death	16 May 1315	John II of Harcourt
	Alix of Brabant, Lady of Mézières-en-Brenne	Godfrey of Brabant, Lord of Aarschot and Vierzon (Leuven)	-	-	21 December 1302 husband's accession	9 November 1329 husband's death	aft. 11 September 1339	John III of Harcourt
	Isabelle de Parthenay, Lady of Vibraye and Bonnétable	Jean l´Archévêque, Lord of Parthenay	-	22 July 1315	9 November 1329 husband's accession	26 August 1346 husband's death	1357	John IV of Harcourt
	Blanche of Ponthieu, Countess of Aumale	John II of Ponthieu, Count of Aumale (Ivrea)	-	1340/41	26 August 1346 husband's accession	8 January 1355 husband's death	12 April 1387	John V of Harcourt
	Catherine of Bourbon	Peter I, Duke of Bourbon (Bourbon)	1342	14 October 1359		28 February 1389 husband's death	7 June 1427	John VI of Harcourt
	Marie d'Alençon	Pierre II, Count of Alençon (Valois-Alençon)	29 March 1373	17 March 1390		1417		John VII of Harcourt

=== English occupation, 1419–1444 ===
Picture	Name	Father	Birth	Marriage	Became Baroness	Ceased to be Baroness	Death	Spouse
	Margaret Holland	Thomas Holland, 2nd Earl of Kent	1385	November/December 1411	1419 husband's accession	22 March 1421 husband's death	30 December 1439	Thomas of Lancaster, 1st Duke of Clarence
	Anne of Burgundy	John the Fearless (Valois-Burgundy)	1404	14 June 1423		1425 ?	14 November 1432	John of Lancaster, 1st Duke of Bedford
	Margaret de Beauchamp	John Beauchamp of Bletso	1 January 1405/6	1439		27 May 1444 husband's death	8 August 1482	John Beaufort, 1st Duke of Somerset

=== House of Harcourt, 1444–1476 ===
- None

=== House of Lorraine, 1476–1528 ===
Picture	Name	Father	Birth	Marriage	Became Baroness	Ceased to be Baroness	Death	Spouse
	Joan, Countess of Tancarville	William, Count of Tancarville (Harcourt)	-	9 September 1471	19 April 1476 husband's accession	1485 marriage annulled	8 November 1488	René
	Philippa of Guelders	Adolf, Duke of Guelders (Egmond)	9 November 1467	1 September 1485		10 December 1508 husband's death	26 February 1547	René
	Antoinette de Bourbon	Francis, Count of Vendôme (Bourbon-La Marche)	25 December 1493	9 June 1513	1520 title conferred by the Conference of Paris	1528; Became Duchess	22 January 1583	Claude

== Marquise of Elbeuf ==
=== House of Lorraine, 1528–1583 ===
Picture	Name	Father	Birth	Marriage	Became Marquise	Ceased to be Marquise	Death	Spouse
	Antoinette de Bourbon	Francis, Count of Vendôme (Bourbon-La Marche)	25 December 1493	9 June 1513	1528; Became Marquise	12 April 1550 husband's death	22 January 1583	Claude
	Louise de Rieux	Claude de Rieux	1531	3 February 1555		14 December 1566 husband's death	1570	René

== Duchess of Elbeuf ==
=== House of Lorraine, 1583–1845 ===
Picture	Name	Father	Birth	Marriage	Became Duchess	Ceased to be Duchess	Death	Spouse
	Marguerite de Chabot	Léonor Chabot (Chabot)	1565	5 February 1583		4 August 1605 husband's death	29 September 1652	Charles I
	Catherine Henriette de Bourbon, Légitimée de France	Henry IV of France (Bourbon (illegitimate))	26 March 1596	20 June 1619		5 November 1657 husband's death	20 June 1663	Charles II
	Élisabeth de La Tour d'Auvergne	Frédéric Maurice de La Tour d'Auvergne (La Tour d'Auvergne)	11 May 1635	20 May 1656	5 November 1657 husband's accession	23 Oct 1680		Charles III
	Françoise de Montault de Navailles	Philippe de Montault de Navailles (Montault de Navailles)	1653	25 August 1684		4 May 1692 husband's death	11 June 1717	Charles III
	Charlotte de Rochechouart de Mortemarte	Louis Victor de Rochechouart de Mortemart (Rochechouart de Mortemart)	1660	28 January 1677	4 May 1692 husband's accession	18 April 1729		Henri
	Innocentia Catherine de Rougé du Plessis-Bellière	Jean de Rougé (Rougé)	28 December 1707	6 June 1747	17 May 1748 husband's accession	17 July 1763 husband's death	1794	Emmanuel Maurice
	Anna Cetner	Ignacy Cetner	14 February 1764	20 May 1803		5 June 1814		Charles Eugène
	Viktoria Folliot de Crenneville	François Méderic Folliot (Folliot)	14 August 1766	23 January 1816		2 November 1825 husband's death	19 October 1845	Charles Eugène

== See also ==
- Duchess of Guise
- Duchess of Lorraine
- Duchess of Aumale
