= François Marie, Prince of Lillebonne =

François Marie
- Prince of Lillebonne
- Born: 4 April 1624; Hôtel d'Elbeuf, Paris, France
- Died: 19 January 1694 (aged 69); Paris, France
- Spouse: Christine d'Estrées; Anne de Lorraine
- Issue Detail: Charles, Prince of Commercy; Béatrice Hiéronyme, Abbess of Remiremont; Élisabeth Thérèse, Princess of Epinoy
Names
- François Marie de Lorraine
- House: Lorraine
- Father: Charles II, Duke of Elbeuf
- Mother: Catherine Henriette de Bourbon

François Marie de Lorraine (4 April 1624 – 19 January 1694) was a French nobleman and member of the House of Lorraine. He was known as the prince de Lillebonne. He was also the Duke of Joyeuse.

== Biography ==
François Marie was born to Charles de Lorraine, Duke of Elbeuf, and his wife Catherine Henriette de Bourbon, Légitimée de France, legitimised daughter of Henry IV of France and Gabrielle d'Estrées. He was the couple's fourth and youngest son. In his youth, he was styled as the Count of Lillebonne, later styling himself as Prince. He was only sold the County of Lillebonne in 1692 by his nephew Henri, Duke of Elbeuf, who had recently lost his father Charles III, Duke of Elbeuf.

A member of the House of Guise founded by Claude, Duke of Guise, he was a Prince of Lorraine as a male line descendant of René II, Duke of Lorraine. At court, he, like members of his Lorraine family, held the rank of Foreign Prince, a rank which was below that of the immediate Royal Family and Princes of the Blood.

His paternal first cousins included the Chevalier de Lorraine (lover of Philippe I, Duke of Orléans) and the Count of Armagnac; his maternal cousins included King Louis XIV and the above-mentioned Duke of Orléans.

He was a captain of cavalry in a regiment of Cardinal Mazarin. He served in the Thirty Years War taking part in the Siege of Lleida in 1644 and, the following year in the Battle of Nördlingen in which he was injured (his brother Charles III, Duke of Elbeuf, also served in this battle). A good military man, he later fought against Spain prior to the marriage between Louis XIV and Maria Teresa of Austria, which cemented peace between the two nations.

He married twice, first on 3 September 1658 to Christine d'Estrées (d. 1658), daughter of François Annibal d'Estrées. The couple had no issue. Christine died in December 1658 having had no children. He married again on 7 October 1660, this time his cousin Anne of Lorraine (1639-1720), daughter of Charles IV, Duke of Lorraine. As a wedding gift, the Duke of Lorraine gave his daughter the Hôtel de Beauvau later renamed the Hôtel de Lillebonne, in Nancy. They were married at the Abbaye Saint-Pierre de Montmartre.

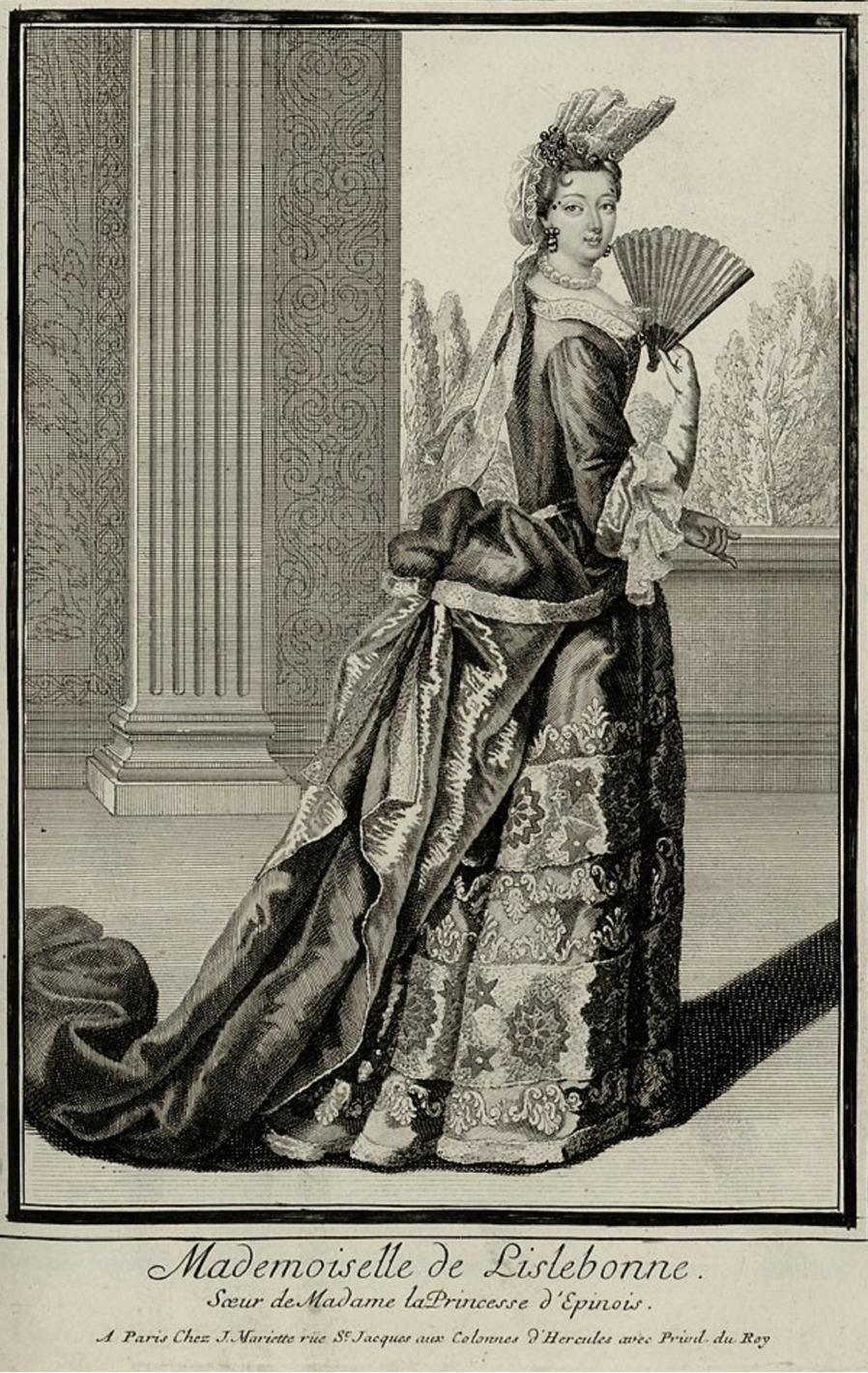
Drawing of his daughter Mademoiselle de Lillebonne.

His brother-in-law was Charles Henri de Lorraine, prince de Vaudémont, son of Charles IV, Duke of Lorraine, and his secret spouse, Béatrix de Cusance.

His eldest son, the Prince of Commercy, died in battle in 1702; his eldest daughter, Béatrice Hiéronyme, was the Abbess of the prestigious abbey at Remiremont Abbey. His other surviving daughter, Élisabeth, married the Prince of Epinoy; Élisabeth was the mother of Anne Julie Adélaïde de Melun, mother of Charles de Rohan. Charles de Rohan was the father of princesse de Condé, grandmother of duc d'Enghien, who was executed in the moat of the Château de Vincennes in March 1804.

François Marie de Lorraine died in Paris at the age of sixty-nine, his wife outliving him by twenty-six years.

== Issue ==
1. Charles François de Lorraine, Prince of Commercy (11 July 1661 – 15 August 1702), never married, died during the Battle of Luzzara in Cremona;
2. Béatrice Hiéronyme de Lorraine, Mademoiselle de Lillebonne, Abbess of Remiremont (1 July 1662 – 9 February 1738), never married, no issue;
3. Thérèse de Lorraine (12 May 1663 – 17 September 1671) died in childhood;
4. Marie Françoise de Lorraine (28 May 1666 – 10 May 1669) died in childhood;
5. Élisabeth Thérèse de Lorraine, Mademoiselle de Commercy (5 April 1664 – 7 March 1748), married Louis de Melun, parents of Louis de Melun, Prince of Epinoy, and Anne Julie de Melun, princesse de Soubise;
6. Sebastienne de Lorraine (19 April 1667 – 15 August 1669) died in infancy;
7. Jeanne Françoise de Lorraine (6 September 1668 – 1680) died in childhood;
8. Henri Louis de Lorraine (26 October 1669 – 17 March 1670) died in infancy;
9. Jean Paul de Lorraine (10 June 1672 – 29 July 1693) died in the Battle of Landen, no issue.

== Ancestry ==
Ancestors of François Marie, Prince of Lillebonne

8. René de Lorraine, Marquis of Elbeuf
4. Charles de Lorraine, Duke of Elbeuf
9. Louise de Rieux
2. Charles de Lorraine, Duke of Elbeuf
10. Léonor Chabot, Count of Charny & of Buzançais
5. Marguerite de Chabot
11. Françoise de Rye, Dame of Longvy & of Rye
1. François Marie de Lorraine
12. Antoine de Bourbon, King of Navarre
6. Henry IV of France
13. Jeanne III of Navarre
3. Catherine Henriette de Bourbon, Légitimée de France
14. Antoine d'Estrées, Marquis of Coeuvres
7. Gabrielle d'Estrées
15. Françoise Babou de La Bourdaisière

== Sources ==
- Georges Poull, La maison ducale de Lorraine, 1991
