= Suzanne Henriette of Lorraine =

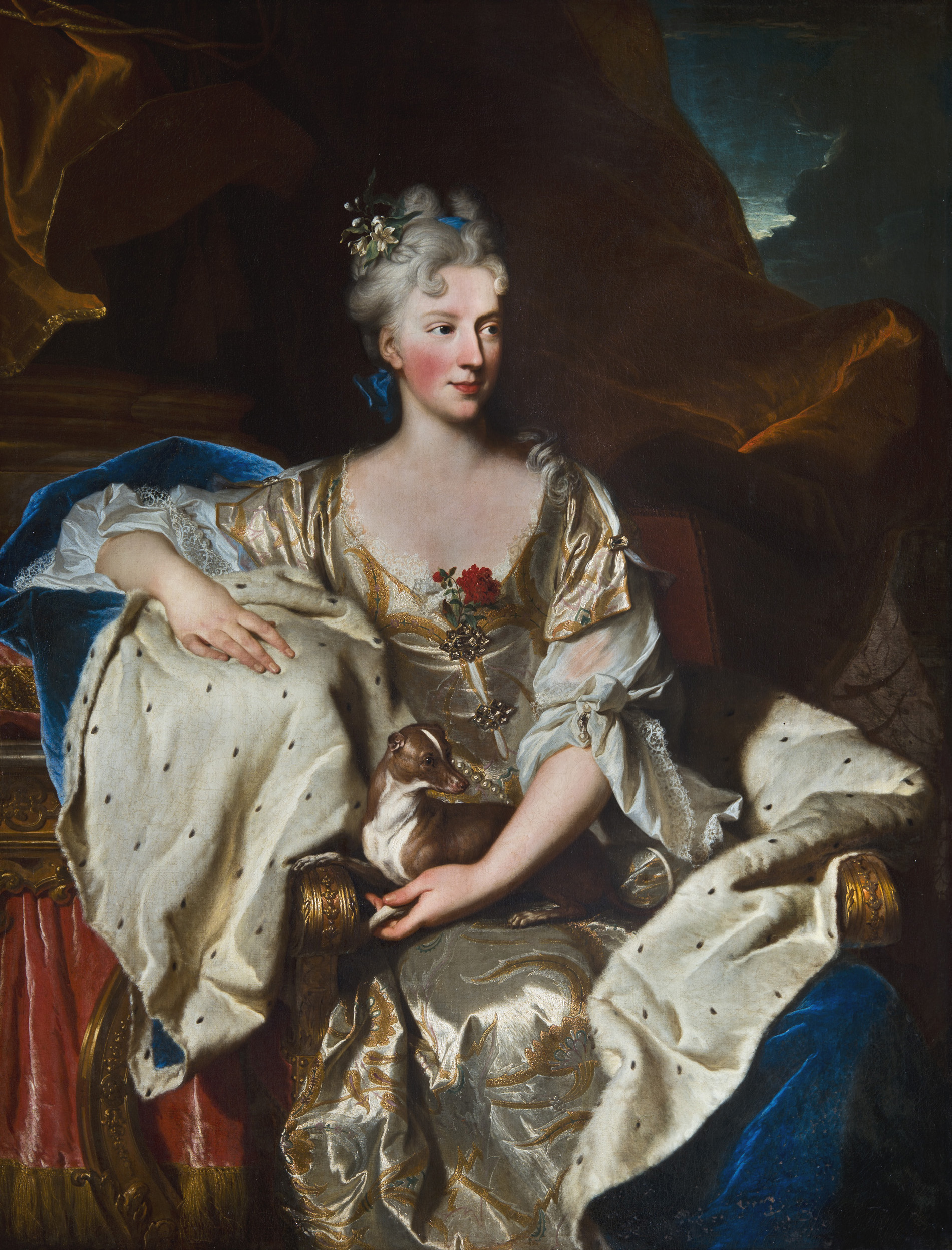
- Portrait by Hyacinthe Rigaud, 1706

Duchess consort of Mantua and Montferrat
- Tenure: 8 November 1704 – 5 July 1708
- Born: 1 February 1686; France
- Died: 19 October 1710 (aged 24); Paris, France
- Burial: Carmel du faubourg Saint-Germain, Paris
- Spouse: Ferdinand Charles Gonzaga
- House: Lorraine
- Father: Charles III, Duke of Elbeuf
- Mother: Françoise de Montault de Navailles

Suzanne Henriette de Lorraine (1 February 1686 – 19 October 1710) was a member of the House of Lorraine, Duchess of Mantua by marriage to Ferdinand Charles Gonzaga. Her spouse was the last Gonzaga duke of Mantua.

== Biography ==
Suzanne Henriette was the penultimate daughter of Charles de Lorraine, Duke of Elbeuf and his third wife Françoise de Montault de Navailles (1653-1717), daughter of Philippe de Montaut-Bénac, Duke de Navailles. Her two older half brothers, Henri and Emmanuel Maurice were successively dukes of Elbeuf and she was known as Mademoiselle d'Elbeuf.

Henri Jules, Prince de Condé (son of le Grand Condé) had proposed his daughter Marie Anne, Mademoiselle de Montmorency as a bride for Ferdinando Carlo Gonzaga, ruler of the Duchies of Mantua and Montferrat (known in France as Charles de Gonzague.), but that alliance was not realized. Ferdinando's first wife and cousin, Anna Isabella Gonzaga, died in August 1703, leaving him childless.

Although the Lorraine-Elbeufs were reckoned among the princes etrangers at the court of France, as a cadet branch of a non-reigning cadet branch (Guise) of the House of Lorraine, it was not their custom to marry crowned heads. Nevertheless, Ferdinando Carlo Gonzaga, Duke of Mantua and Montferrat sought Suzanne Henriette's hand in pursuit of a dynastic alliance with another reigning ducal house under French influence. Mlle. d'Elbeuf married the Duke in Milan, to which she had been conducted by her grandmother Catherine Henriette de Bourbon.

He died on 5 July 1708, leaving Suzanne Henriette a widow at the age of 22.

Suzanne Henriette returned to France. Later she was involved in a lawsuit between Leopold, Duke of Lorraine and Anne of Bavaria, Princess de Condé, over inheritance of the Guise fortune. Residing in Paris, she died there in 1710 at the age of 24. She was buried at the Carmel du faubourg Saint-Germain in the crypt of her grandfather, the Maréchal de Navailles. Saint-Simon observed that she died in the flower of her youth after a long illness, also noting that, having been considered a beauty, her "bizarre" marriage had been the cause of a sad life.

== Ancestry ==
Ancestors of Suzanne Henriette of Lorraine

8. Charles I, Duke of Elbeuf
4. Charles II, Duke of Elbeuf
9. Marguerite Chabot, Countess of Charny
2. Charles III, Duke of Elbeuf
10.Henry IV of France
5. Catherine Henriette de Bourbon
11.Gabrielle d'Estrées
1. Suzanne Henriette of Lorraine
12. Philippe de Montault, Duke of Lavedan
6. Philippe de Navailles, Duke of Montault
13. Judith de Gontaut, Lady of Badefol
3. Françoise de Montault de Navailles
14. Charles de Baudéan, Count of Parabère
7. Suzanne de Baudéan
15. Françoise Louise Tiraqueau
