= Emmanuel Maurice, Duke of Elbeuf =

Emmanuel Maurice
- Duke of Elbeuf
- Born: 30 December 1677; Hôtel d'Elboeuf, Paris, France
- Died: 17 July 1763 (aged 85); France
- Spouse: Marie Therese de Stramboni; Innocentia Catherine du Plessis
- House: Lorraine
- Father: Charles III, Duke of Elbeuf
- Mother: Élisabeth de La Tour d'Auvergne

Armoiries for Duke of Elbeuf

Emmanuel Maurice de Lorraine (Emmanuel Maurice; 30 December 1677 – 17 July 1763) was Duke of Elbeuf and Prince of Lorraine. He succeeded his older brother Henri (1661–1748) as duke. He died without any surviving issue.

== Biography ==
Emmanuel Maurice was born the youngest son of Charles III, Duke of Elbeuf, and his second wife, Élisabeth de La Tour d'Auvergne, daughter of the Duke of Bouillon, member of the illustrious House of La Tour d'Auvergne. She was a niece of the vicomte de Turenne.

A member of the House of Guise founded by Claude, Duke of Guise, he was a Prince of Lorraine as a male line descendant of René II, Duke of Lorraine.

His sister in law was Charlotte de Rochechouart de Mortemart, a daughter of Louis Victor de Rochechouart de Mortemart and a niece of Madame de Montespan. His half sister Suzanne Henriette was later the Duchess of Mantua.

In 1706, he served under Joseph I, Holy Roman Emperor at Naples as lieutenant general of the Cavalry. As a result, Louis XIV deserted him.

Living in Naples, he commissioned the Neapolitan architect Ferdinando Sanfelice to construct him a private residence on the outskirts of the city in Portici in 1711. The property was called the villa d’Elbeuf. From 1711 until 1716 he lived at the villa. This villa was seen by Charles, King of Naples and his wife Maria Amalia of Saxony in 1738 and the couple were so impressed that the couple ordered the construction of the Reggia di Portici which still stands today.

He is usually credited for discovering the ruins at Herculaneum and Pompeii. While living in Naples, he underwrote the first efforts to tunnel into the ground at the site. His men happened to dig right into an ancient Roman theater at Herculaneum and were able to extract a number of marble statues. Most of these were used to decorate his estate; others were distributed across Europe. The same year as the excavations he returned to France to regain his possessions.

Styled prince d'Elbeuf, he was not expected to become Duke of Elbeuf as he was the youngest of five sons born to his father and his first two wives. His older half brothers Charles (1660–1690), Henri Frédéric (1657–1666) and Louis de Lorraine (1662–1693) died before their father and the duchy was thus inherited by Emmanuel Maurice's other surviving brother Henri.

Henri died without any surviving issue, two of his sons dying within a week of each other in 1705 having been in the War of the Spanish Succession. Emmanuel Maurice became Duke of Elbeuf in May 1748 holding the title till his death.

Emmanuel Maurice married twice but neither union produced issue. He died aged 85 and was succeeded by his second cousin Charles Eugène de Lorraine.

== Marriages ==
Emmanuel Maurice married twice;

- Marie Therese de Stramboni (d.1745) - married 25 October 1713; no issue; the couple married in Naples;
- Innocentia Catherine de Rougé du Plessis-Bellière, see House of Rougé (1707–1794) - married 6 June 1747; no issue.

== Ancestry ==
Ancestors of Emmanuel Maurice, Duke of Elbeuf

8. Charles de Lorraine, Duke of Elbeuf
4. Charles de Lorraine, Duke of Elbeuf
9. Marguerite Chabot, Countess of Charny
2. Charles de Lorraine, Duke of Elbeuf
10.Henry IV of France
5. Catherine Henriette de Bourbon, Légitimée de France
11.Gabrielle d'Estrées
1. Emmanuel Maurice de Lorraine
12. Henri de La Tour d'Auvergne, Duke of Bouillon
6. Frédéric Maurice de La Tour d'Auvergne, Duke of Bouillon
13. Countess Elisabeth of Nassau
3. Élisabeth de La Tour d'Auvergne
14. Frederik van den Bergh
7. Leonora Berg-s'Heerenberg
15. Françoise de Ravenel

== Sources ==
- Georges Poull, La maison ducale de Lorraine, 1991
