= Henri, Duke of Elbeuf =

Henri
- Duke of Elbeuf
- Born: 7 July 1661; Hôtel d'Elboeuf, Paris, France
- Died: 17 May 1748 (aged 86); Elboeuf, France
- Spouse: Charlotte de Rochechouart de Mortemart
- House: Lorraine
- Father: Charles III, Duke of Elbeuf
- Mother: Élisabeth de La Tour d'Auvergne

Henri de Lorraine (7 August 1661–17 May 1748) was Duke of Elbeuf and member of the House of Lorraine. He succeeded his father Charles de Lorraine to the Duchy-Peerage of Elbeuf. He was also a Peer of France.

== Biography ==
Born to Charles III, Duke of Elbeuf, and his second wife, Élisabeth de La Tour d'Auvergne, daughter of the Duke of Bouillon, member of the illustrious House of La Tour d'Auvergne. She was a niece of the vicomte de Turenne.

His younger half sister Suzanne Henriette (1686–1710) married Ferdinand Charles, Duke of Mantua and Montferrat in 1704. His paternal cousin's included Béatrice Hiéronyme de Lorraine, Abbess of Remiremont and Anne Julie de Melun, mother of the Maréchal-Prince de Soubise.

A member of the House of Guise founded by Claude, Duke of Guise, he was a Prince of Lorraine as a male line descendant of René II, Duke of Lorraine.

In his youth he was not expected to succeed to the Duchy-Peerage of Elbeuf as his father had a son (another Charles, 1650–1690) from a previous marriage as well as his oldest full brother Henri Frédéric. Henri Frédéric died in 1666 aged 9 and Charles in 1690. During this time, he was styled as the prince de Lillebonne and prince d'Elbeuf, the latter was what he used in his marriage contract.

He was married to Charlotte de Rochechouart de Mortemart, a daughter of Louis Victor de Rochechouart de Mortemart and a niece of Madame de Montespan. The two were married at the Château de Saint Germain en Laye on 28 January 1677. The couple had three children, two sons and a daughter. None of his children married or had any children, his two sons died in 1705 having taken part in the War of the Spanish Succession, both dying within days of each other in Piedmont modern day Italy.

His wife died in 1729. Henri himself died at Elbeuf aged 86. The duchy of Elbeuf went to his younger brother Emmanuel Maurice de Lorraine.

== Issue ==
1. Philippe de Lorraine, Prince of Elbeuf (October 1678–18 June 1705), died at Piedmont in the War of the Spanish Succession, never married;
2. Armande Charlotte de Lorraine, Mademoiselle d'Elboeuf (15 June 1683–18 December 1701), never married;
3. Charles de Lorraine, Prince of Elboeuf (1 September 1685–21 June 1705), never married.

He also had two illegitimate sons by Françoise de Marsilly neither of which had issue.

== Ancestry ==
Ancestors of Henri, Duke of Elbeuf

16. René de Lorraine, Marquis of Elbeuf
8. Charles de Lorraine, Duke of Elbeuf
17. Louise de Rieux
4. Charles de Lorraine, Duke of Elbeuf
18. Léonor Chabot, Count of Charny
9. Marguerite Chabot, Countess of Charny
19. Françoise de Rye, Dame de Longwy
2. Charles de Lorraine, Duke of Elbeuf
20. Antoine de Bourbon, King of Navarre
10.Henry IV of France
21. Jeanne III of Navarre
5. Catherine Henriette de Bourbon, Légitimée de France
22. Antoine d'Estrées, Marquis of Coeuvres
11.Gabrielle d'Estrées
23. Françoise Babou de La Bourdaisière
1. Henri de Lorraine
24. François de La Tour d'Auvergne, Viscount of Turenne
12. Henri de La Tour d'Auvergne, Duke of Bouillon
25. Eléonore de Montmorency
6. Frédéric Maurice de La Tour d'Auvergne, Duke of Bouillon
26. William the Silent
13. Elisabeth Flandrina of Orange-Nassau
27. Charlotte de Bourbon
3. Élisabeth de La Tour d'Auvergne
28. Willem IV, Count van den Bergh
14. Frederik, Count van den Bergh
29. Countess Maria of Nassau-Dillenburg
7. Countess Leonora Berg-s'Heerenberg
30. Eustache de Ravenel
15. Françoise de Ravenel
31. Marie de Renty
