= Charles of Lorraine =

Charles of Lorraine (Charles de Lorraine) may refer to:

- Charles, Duke of Lower Lorraine (953–993)
- Charles II of Lorraine (1364–1431)
- Charles III of Lorraine (1543–1608)
- Charles de Lorraine de Vaudémont (1561-1587), French Roman Catholic cardinal and Bishop of Verdun
- Charles of Lorraine (bishop of Metz and Strasbourg) (1567–1607), cardinal and Bishop of Metz
- Charles IV of Lorraine (1604–1675)
- Charles V of Lorraine (1643–1690)
- Charles Alexander of Lorraine (1712–1780)
- Charles of Lorraine, Duke of Mayenne (1554–1611)
- Charles, Cardinal of Lorraine (1524–1574)
- Charles I, Duke of Elbeuf (1556–1605)
- Charles II, Duke of Elbeuf (1596–1657)
- Charles III, Duke of Elbeuf (1620–1692)
- Charles, Count of Marsan (1648–1708)
- Charles Henri, Prince of Vaudémont (1649–1723)
- Charles, Prince of Commercy (1661–1702)
- Charles Joseph of Lorraine (1680–1715)
- Charles de Lorraine, Count of Armagnac (1684–1751)
