= Louis Victor de Rochechouart, Duke of Vivonne =

French nobleman

Louis Victor de Rochechouart
- 2nd Duke of Mortemart; Duke of Vivonne
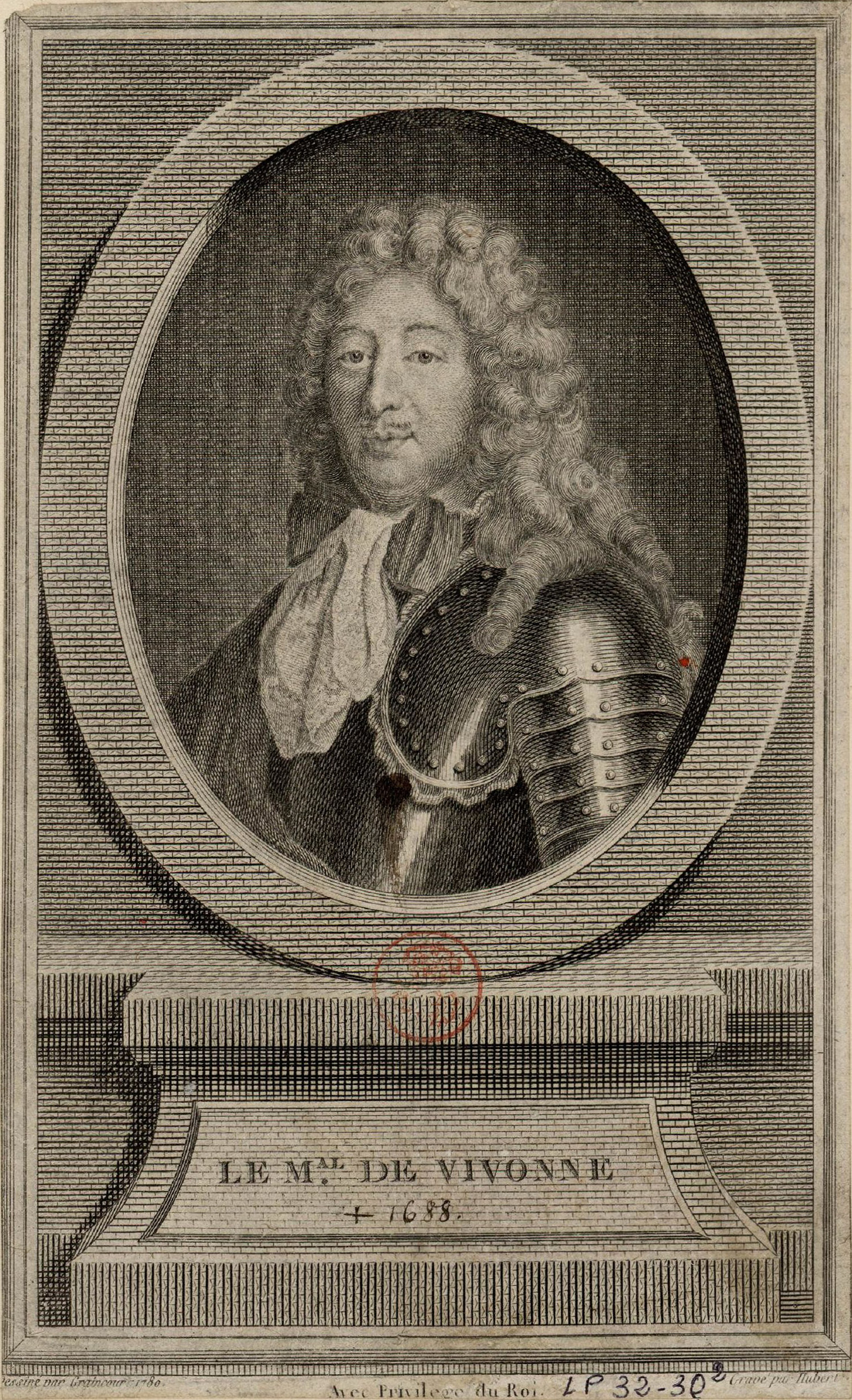
- Engraving of Louis Victor
- Full name: Louis Victor de Rochechouart
- Other titles: Maréchal de Vivonne
- Born: 25 August 1636; Hôtel de Rochechouart, Paris, France
- Died: 15 September 1688 (aged 52); Chaillot, Paris, France
- Noble family: House of Rochechouart
- Spouse: Antoinette Louise de Mesmes
- Issue Detail: Gabrielle, Abbess of Beaumont-lès-Tours; Charlotte, Duchess of Elbeuf; Louis, Prince of Tonnay-Charente; Marie Élisabeth, Countess of Castries; Louise Françoise, Abbess of Fontevrault; Gabrièlle Victoire, Duchess of Lesdiguières
- Father: Gabriel de Rochechouart de Mortemart
- Mother: Diane de Grandseigne

Louis Victor de Rochechouart, 2nd Duke of Mortemart and Duke of Vivonne (25 August 1636 – 15 September 1688) was a French military officer and nobleman who was a member of the ancient House of Rochechouart. His father, Gabriel de Rochechouart de Mortemart, was a childhood friend of Louis XIII. His older sister was Gabrielle de Rochechouart de Mortemart, a celebrated beauty of the era; another sister was Madame de Montespan, the mistress of Louis XIV. Louis de Rochechouart commanded the French fleet in the Battle of Palermo. He was made a Marshal of France.

== Biography ==
The only son of Gabriel de Rochechouart de Mortemart, he was a member of the ancient House of Rochechouart which were the most ancient noble family in France after the royal family. This powerful dynasty of the Carolingian era dates back to Foucher, supporter of Charles the Bald, who became viscount (vicomte) of Limoges in 876. His descendants—Limoges, Rochechouart, Mortemart and de Brosse—ruled over the area for several centuries. The family takes its name from their seat at Rochechouart.

His siblings were famous in their own right; his eldest sister, Gabrielle de Rochechouart de Mortemart (1634–1693), was a celebrated beauty famed for her obsession with her own self-importance; the next sister, Françoise de Rochechouart de Mortemart (1643–1707), was the future maîtresse en titre of Louis XIV from 1667 giving him seven children. His youngest, often called the most beautiful of the Mortemart daughters, was Marie Madeleine, who took a religious path in life later being nicknamed the reine des Abbesses, "Queen of Abbesses". She was the Abbess of Fontevraud, the ancient and wealthy convent in Anjou.

He was born at the Hôtel de Rochechouart, the family town house in Paris, on 25 August 1636 and was given the courtesy title of Count of Vivonne, one of the family's numerous titles. The county was later elevated to a duchy by which he is better known. He was an enfant d'honneur, a child with the right to play with the infant Dauphin, the future Louis XIV. Later on, he was noted as one of the bravest and wittiest men at Louis XIV's court.

Louis Victor voluntarily entered the military in 1653 as the Captain of the Royal Guard under the command of Roger de Rabutin, cousin of the famous Madame de Sévigné. He distinguished himself greatly in Flanders and in Artois under the command of Henri de La Tour d'Auvergne, Vicomte de Turenne. He was notable for his involvement in the sieges of Landrecies, Condé-sur-l'Escaut and Valenciennes. Roger de Rabutin reported to his cousin the bravery of the young Louis Victor at Condé under his command.

Later Colonel of the Royal Etranger, he served in Italy twice before demanding a place in the Marines. He worked with the Duke of Beaufort, and was later created the Grand Master of Navigation.

=== General of the Galleys ===
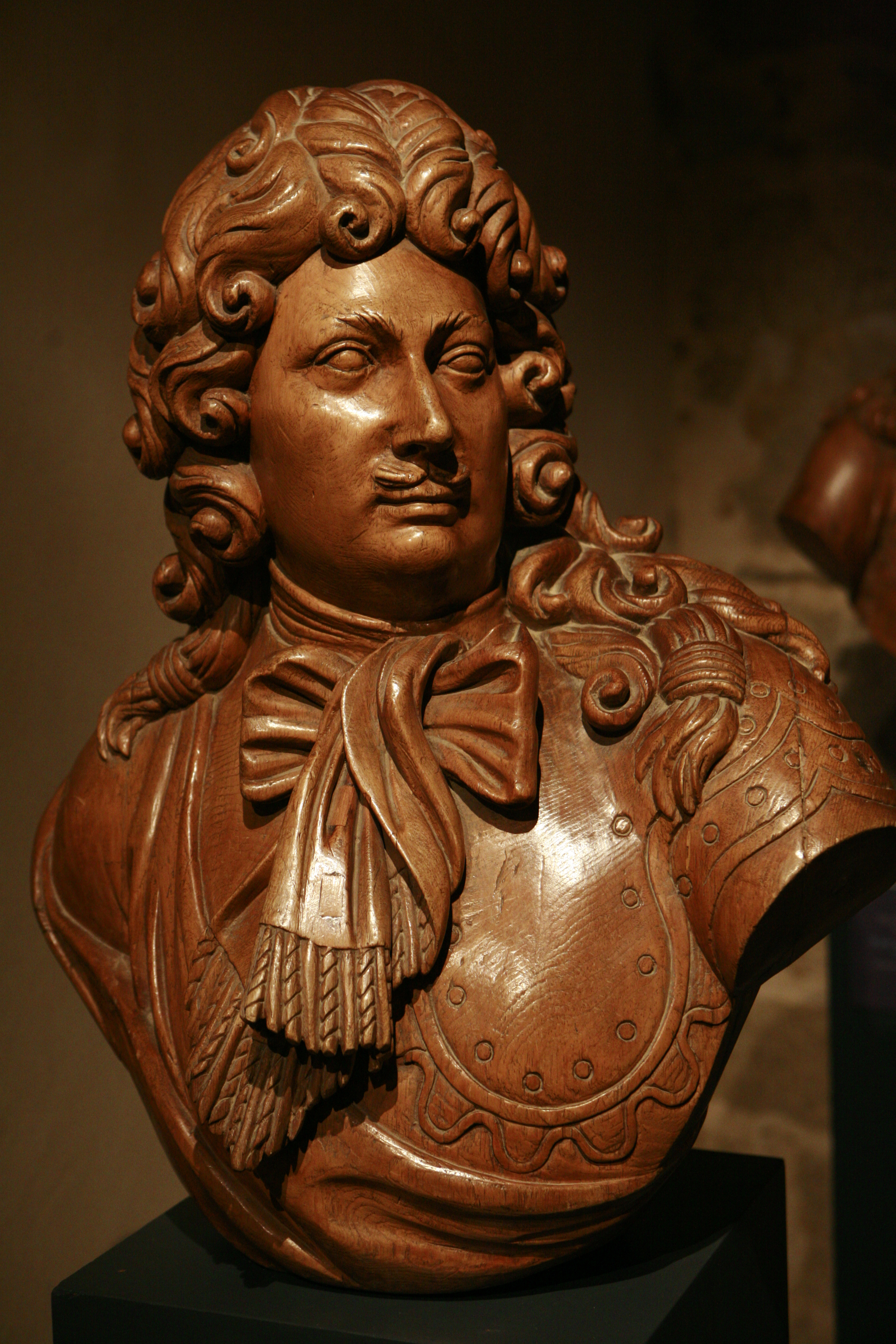
Duke of Vivone at Brest naval museum

Captain of vessels and created a Peer of France in 1663, he embarked with the unfortunate Chevalier Paul on an expedition to Jijel in north eastern Algeria. When war had been declared with Spain in 1667, Louis Victor distinguished himself in Flanders under the eyes of the king himself. When not on the field, Louis Victor was campaigning on the galleys becoming général des galères in March 1669, partly due to the influence of his sister la Belle Montespan who had been Louis XIV's mistress for about two years by then. Some time after his promotion he attacked the Turks who had invaded the Venetians at the siege of Candia. After the death of Beaufort (25 June 1669) Louis Victor bought up the vessels and continued the fight.

Injured due to combat on 24 July, he was quick to realise that he could not force the Turks to retreat, withdrawing himself to Toulon. In 1671 he was given command of protecting the southern coast of France from Barbary pirates. In 1672, in the French War with Holland, he took part in the famous crossing of the Rhine. His horse, Claud Le Blanc, tripped in the water, causing Louis Victor to fall into the river. At the same moment, he was shot in the arm and he had to be carried away in a sling but he was carried with the pride of the Mortemarts. In 1673 he signalled the siege of Maastricht. The next year he was named Governor of Champagne.

=== Viceroy of Sicily ===
The next year, 1675, Louis XIV sent him to Messina where there had been a revolt under Spanish control of Sicily. By 11 February he had sent relief to the town and on 2 August 1675 he was created a Marshal of France. He was known as the Maréchal de Vivonne. In August 1676, (22 Aug.) he was made the Viceroy of Sicily, where he sent navies to Duquesne Tourville who were fighting with the Dutch in the Battles of Augusta (22 April 1676) and Palermo (2 June 1676). Louis Victor is known to have declared to the local people on behalf of the Sun King that there was held "nothing more at heart than the triumph of the victims against their oppressors" and that he would "take them definitively under his powerful and friendly protection".

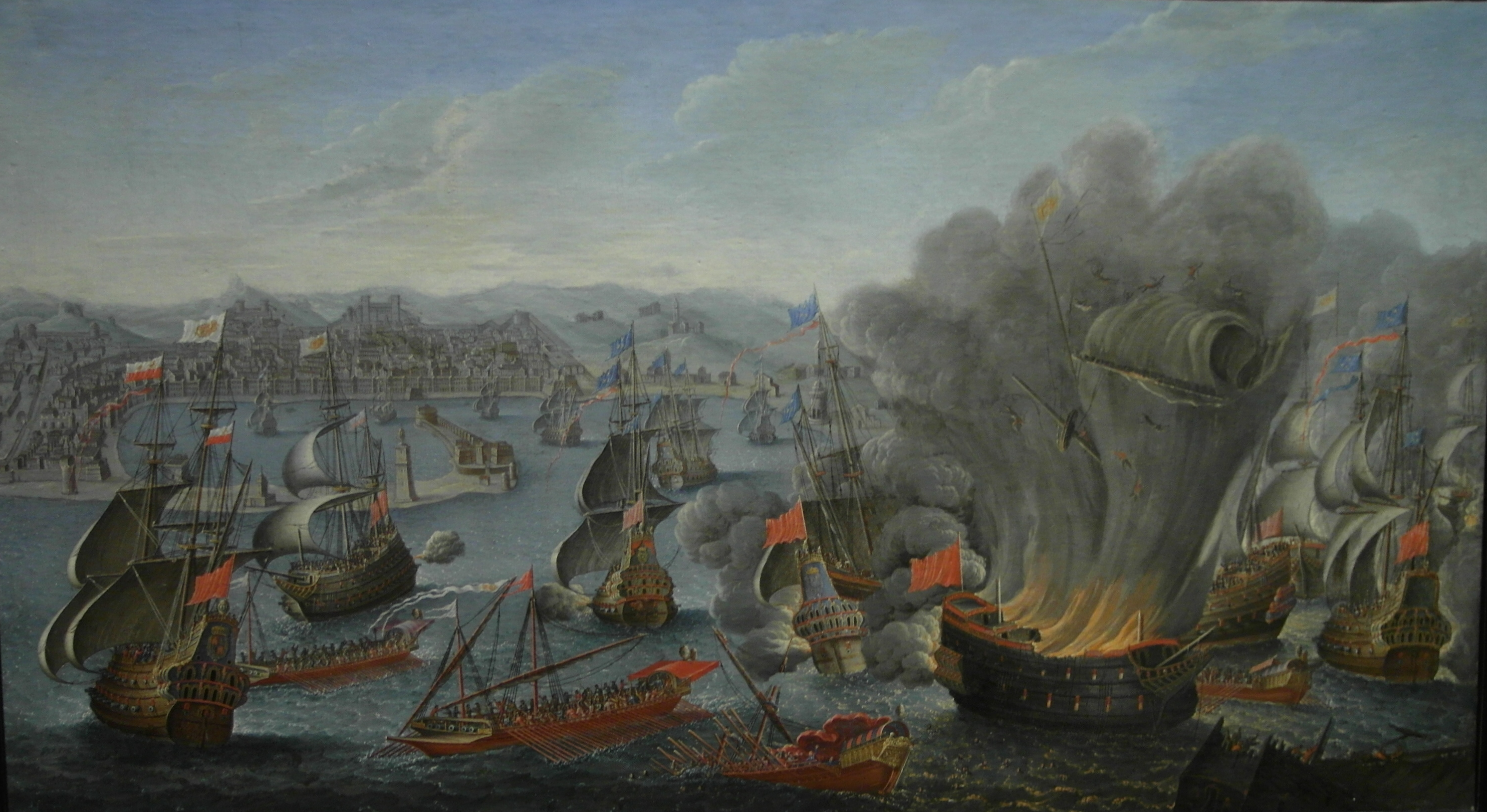
The battle of Palermo in 1676

Despite this, the king ordered Louis Victor to abandon the site in January, 1678, leaving Messina to defend itself. As time went on, French men who were left at the place were killed by Sicilians out of reaction to the French abandonment.

After the French evacuated Messina in April 1678, Louis Victor stopped working at sea.

=== First Gentleman of the King's Chamber ===
Returning to Paris having a very successful military career, he was created Premier gentilhomme de la Chambre du Roi, "First Gentleman of the King's Bedchamber". He had returned to a court that was no longer dominated by his sisters influence. Despite this, he had an intriguing life at court and later became an intimate of the king himself. "Monsieur de Vivonne had infinite spirit and entertained it without fear; he pleased the king with a hundred stories" reported the duc de Saint-Simon.

Louis Victor was also close to the playwright Molière, and Nicolas Boileau, whom, he himself presented to the king.

His only son, Louis died in April 1688; Louis Victor was greatly affected by the loss of his only son.

He died at Chaillot aged 52. He was succeeded by his grandson Louis de Rochechouart de Mortemart (1681–1740).

His daughter, Marie Élisabeth, comtesse de Castries, was a lady-in-waiting to her first cousin, the duchesse d'Orléans; the two were very close but when Madame de Castries suggested a marital union between the families, the Duchess of Orléans reprimanded her for the idea of an Orléans daughter marrying a mere nobleman.

He was outlived by his wife, Antoinette Louise who died in 1709.

== Marriage ==
In September, 1655, Louis Victor married Antoinette Louise de Mesmes (1640–10 March 1709) at the Château de Beynes. The couple had six children, three of which would have progeny.

== Children ==
1. Gabrielle de Rochechouart (1658 – 24 October 1733) never married; Abbess of Beaumont-lès-Tours like her second cousin Henriette Louise de Bourbon;
2. Charlotte de Rochechouart de Mortemart (1660 – 18 April 1729) married Henri, Duke of Elbeuf (son of Charles III, duc d'Elbeuf and Catherine Henriette de Bourbon) and had issue;
3. Louis de Rochechouart (1663 – 3 April 1688) married Marie Anne Colbert, daughter of Jean-Baptiste Colbert on 14 February 1679 and had issue; known as the prince de Tonnay-Charente; his descendants include the present Duke of Noailles and the present Marquess of Lansdowne through Émilie Jane de Flahault de Billarderie;
4. Marie Élisabeth de Rochechouart (1663 – 5 May 1718) married Joseph François de La Croix, Marquis of Castries on 19 May 1693 and had issue; she was a lady in waiting to her first cousin the Duchess of Orléans;
5. Louise Françoise de Rochechouart (1664 – 16 February 1742) never married; Abbess in Fontevrault; shared her name with her cousin the Duchess of Bourbon and Mademoiselle du Maine;
6. Gabrielle Victoire de Rochechouart (1670 - 23 April 1740) married Alphonse de Créquy on 12 September 1702 and had no issue;

== See also ==
- Vivonne (disambiguation)
