= Prince étranger =

French Nobility Hierarchy

Prince étranger (English: "foreign prince") was a high, though somewhat ambiguous, rank at the French royal court of the Ancien Régime.

== Terminology ==
In medieval Europe, a nobleman bore the title of prince as an indication of sovereignty, either actual or potential. Aside from those who were or claimed to be monarchs, it belonged to those who were in line to succeed to a royal or independent throne. France had several categories of prince in the early modern period. They frequently quarrelled, and sometimes sued each other and members of the nobility, over precedence and distinctions.

The foreign princes ranked in France above "titular princes" (princes de titre, holders of a legal but foreign title of prince which carried no right of succession to any sovereign realm), and above most titled nobles, including the highest among these, dukes. They ranked below acknowledged members of the House of Capet, France's ruling dynasty since the tenth century. Included in that royal category (in descending order) were:

1. the famille du roi ("royal family"): consisting of the king, the queen, any queens dowager, and the legitimate children (enfants de France) and male-line grandchildren (petits-enfants de France) of a French king or of a dauphin;
2. the princes du sang ("princes of the Blood Royal": legitimate male-line great-grandchildren, and their male-line descendants, of French kings, e.g. the houses of Condé, Conti and Montpensier); and
3. the so-called princes légitimés ("legitimated princes": the legitimised natural children, and their male-line descendants, of French kings, e.g. Orléans-Longueville, Bourbon-Vendôme and Bourbon-Penthièvre).

This hierarchy in France evolved slowly at the king's court, barely taking into account any more exalted status a foreign prince might enjoy in his own dynasty's realm. It was not clear, outside the halls of the Parlement of Paris, whether foreign princes ranked above, below, or with the holder of a French peerage.

Deposed rulers and their consorts (e.g. King James II of England, Queen Christina of Sweden, Duchess Suzanne-Henriette of Mantua, etc.) ranked above the foreign princes, and were usually accorded full protocolar courtesies at court, for as long as they remained welcome in France.

Foreign princes were of three kinds:

1. those domiciled in France but recognized by the current king as junior members of dynasties that reigned abroad
  - the Guise cadets of the ducal House of Lorraine
  - the Nevers cadets of Mantua's ducal House of Gonzaga
  - the Nemours cadets of the ducal House of Savoy
2. rulers of small principalities who sometimes or habitually sojourned at the French court
  - Princes of Orange, of the House of Chalon-Arlay and the House of Nassau from the 15th c. on
  - Princes of Monaco, of the House of Grimaldi from the 15 c. on
  - Dukes of Bouillon, of the House of La Marck and, later, of the House of La Tour d'Auvergne
3. French nobles who claimed membership in a formerly sovereign dynasty, either in the male line or who claimed a foreign throne as heirs in the female line
  - Rohan, male-line descendants of the dukes of Brittany
  - La Trémoïlle, heirs of the House of Trastámara as kings of Naples

== Status ==
Like knights-errant of chivalric folklore, whether in exile or in search of royal patronage, to win renown at arms, international influence, or a private fortune, foreign princelings often migrated to the French court, regarded as both the most magnificent and munificent in Europe in the seventeenth and eighteenth centuries. Some ruled small border realms (e.g., the principalities of Dombes, Orange, Neuchâtel, Sedan), while others inherited or were granted large properties in France (e.g., Guise, Rohan, La Tour d'Auvergne). Still others came to France as relatively destitute refugees (e.g. Queen Henrietta Maria of England, the Prince Palatine Eduard).

Most found that, with assiduity and patience, they were well received by France's king as living adornments to his majesty and, if they remained in attendance at court, were often gifted with high office (the princesse de Lamballe, the princesse des Ursins), military command (Henri de la Tour d'Auvergne, Vicomte de Turenne), estates, governorships, embassies, church sinecures (the Rohans in the Archbishopric of Strasbourg), titles and, sometimes, splendid dowries as the consorts of royal princesses (e.g. Louis Joseph de Lorraine, Duke of Guise).

But they were often also disruptive at court and occasionally proved threatening to the king. Their high birth not only attracted the king's attention, but sometimes drew the allegiance of frustrated noble courtiers, soldiers-of-fortune and henchmen, ambitious bourgeoisie, malcontents and even provinces in search of a protector (e.g., the Neapolitan Republic) -- often against or in rivalry with the French Crown itself. Deeming themselves to belong to the same class as the king, they tended to be proud, and some schemed for ever-higher rank and power, or challenged the king's or parliament's authority. Sometimes they defied the royal will and barricaded themselves in their provincial castles (e.g., Philippe Emmanuel of Lorraine, duc de Mercœur), occasionally waging open war on the king (e.g., the La Tour d'Auvergne dukes of Bouillon), or intriguing against him with other French princes (e.g., during the Frondes) or with foreign powers (e.g., Marie de Rohan-Montbazon, duchesse de Chevreuse).

== Rivalry with peers ==
Although during the king's formal receptions (the Honneurs de la Cour) their sovereign origins were acknowledged in deferential prose, foreign princes were not members by hereditary right of the nation's main judicial and deliberative body, the Parlement of Paris, unless they also held a peerage; in which case, their legal precedence derived from its date of registration in that body. Their notorious disputes with ducal peers of the realm, remembered thanks to the memoirs of the duc de Saint-Simon, were due to the princes' lack of rank per se in the Parlement, where peers (the highest tier of French nobility, mostly dukes) held precedence immediately after the princes du sang (or, from 4 May 1610, after the legitimised princes). Whereas at the king's table and in society generally, the prestige of the princes étrangers exceeded that of the ordinary peer, the dukes denied this pre-eminence, both in the Montmorency-Luxembourg lawsuit and in the Parlement, despite the king's commands.

They also clashed with the upstarts at court favored by Henry III, who raised to peerage, fortune, and singular honor a number of fashionable young men of the minor nobility. These so-called mignons were disdained and resisted by France's princes initially. Later, endowed with hereditary wealth and honors, their families were absorbed into the peerage, and their daughters' dowries were sought by the princely class (e.g., the ducal heiress of Joyeuse married, in sequence, a duc de Montpensier and a duc de Guise).

More frequently, they vied for place and prestige with each other, with the princes légitimés, and sometimes even with the princes du sang of the House of Bourbon.

== Noted foreign princes habitually at the French Court ==
During the reign of Louis XIV, the families which held the status of prince étranger were:

- Savoy-Carignano, cadets of the sovereign dukes of Savoy and maternally descendants of the Bourbon counts of Soissons
- Guise, cadets of the reigning dukes of Lorraine
- Rohan, descendants of the dukes of Brittany
- La Tour d'Auvergne, reigning dukes of Bouillon
- Grimaldi, ruling princes of Monaco
- La Trémoïlle, heirs of the body of the deposed Trastámara kings of Naples (who were also pretenders to the kingdoms of Jerusalem, Cyprus, and Armenia).

Most renowned among the foreign princes was the militantly Catholic House of Guise which, as the Valois kings approached extinction and the Huguenots aggrandized in defense of Protestantism, cast ambitious eyes upon the throne itself, hoping to occupy it but determined to dominate it. So great was their pride that Henry I, Duke of Guise, although merely a subject, dared to openly court Margaret of Valois, the daughter of Henry II. He was obliged to hastily wed a princesse étrangère, Catherine of Cleves, to avoid bodily harm from Margaret's offended brothers (three of whom eventually succeeded to the crown as, respectively, Francis II, Charles IX and Henry III). After the St. Bartholomew's Day Massacre the Guises, triumphant in a kingdom purged of Protestant rivals, proved overbearing toward the king, driving Henry III to have the duke assassinated in his presence.

== Titles ==
Most foreign princes did not initially use "prince" as a personal title. Since the families which held that rank were famous and few in the ancien régime of France, a title carried less distinction than the family surname. Thus noble titles, even chevalier, were commonly and indifferently borne by foreign princes in the sixteenth and seventeenth centuries without any implication that their precedence was limited to the rank normally associated with that title. For instance, the title vicomte de Turenne, made famous by the renowned marshal, Henri de la Tour d'Auvergne, was a subsidiary title traditionally borne by a junior member of the family. But he ranked as a prince étranger rather than as a viscount, being a cadet of the dynasty which reigned over the mini-duchy of Bouillon until the French Revolution.

In France, some important seigneuries (lordships) were styled principalities since the late Middle Ages. Their lords had no specific rank, and were always officially subordinate to dukes and to foreign princes. Beginning in the late sixteenth century, some of France's leading families, denied the rank of prince at court, assumed the title of prince. Often it was claimed on behalf of their eldest sons, subtly reminding the court that the princely title was subordinate — at least in the law — to that of duke-peer, while minimising the risk that the princely style, used as a mere courtesy title, would be challenged or forbidden. Typical were the ducs de La Rochefoucauld: Their claim to descend from the independent duke Guillaume IV of Guyenne, and their inter-marriages with the sovereign dukes of Mirandola, failed to secure for them royal recognition as foreign princes. Yet the ducal heir is still known as the "prince de Marcillac", although no such principality ever existed, within or without France.

In the eighteenth century, as dukes and lesser noblemen arrogated to themselves the title "prince de X", more of the foreign princes began to do the same. Like the princes du sang (e.g. Condé, La Roche-sur-Yon), it became one of their de facto prerogatives to unilaterally attach a princely titre de courtoisie to a seigneurie which not only lacked any independence as a principality but might not even belong to the titleholder, having merely been owned at some point by his family (e.g., prince d'Harcourt and prince de Lambesc in the House of Lorraine-Guise; prince d'Auvergne and prince de Turenne in the House of La Tour d'Auvergne; prince de Montauban and prince de Rochefort in the House of Rohan; prince de Talmond in the House of La Trémoïlle). Nonetheless, these titles were then passed down within families as if they were hereditary peerages. Certain non-European families were diplomatically referred to using titles equivalent to Prince de titre and were allowed to use the style of votre altesse, even if they ranked closer to Counts or Marquis (such as the Pillai-Pari family after the Carnatic wars).

Moreover, some noble titles of prince conferred on Frenchmen by the Holy Roman Empire, the Papacy or Spain were eventually accepted at the French court (e.g., Prince de Broglie, Prince de Beauvau-Craon, Prince de Bauffremont) and became more common in the eighteenth century. But they carried no official rank, and their social status was not equal to that of either peers or foreign princes.

Unsurprisingly, foreign princes began adopting a custom increasingly common outside France; prefixing their Christian names with "le prince". The genealogist par excellence of the French nobility, Père Anselme, initially deprecated such neologistic practice with insertion of a "dit" ("styled" or "so-called") in his biographical entries, but after the reign of Louis XIV he records the usage among princes étrangers without qualification.

== Privileges ==
Foreign princes were entitled to the style "haut et puissant prince" ("high and mighty Prince") in French etiquette, were called "cousin" by the king, and claimed the right to be addressed as votre altesse (Your Highness).

Although Saint-Simon and other peers were loath to concede these prerogatives to the princes étrangers, they were even more jealous of two other privileges, the so-called pour ("for") and the tabouret ("stool"). The former referred to the rooms assigned at the palace of Versailles to allow foreign princes, along with members of the royal dynasty, high-ranking officers of the royal household, senior peers and favored courtiers, the honor of living under the same roof as the king. These rooms were neither well-appointed nor well-situated relative to those of the royal family, usually being small and remote. Nonetheless, les pours distinguished the court's inner circle from its hangers-on.

The tabouret was even more highly valued. It consisted of the right for a woman or girl to sit on a stool or ployant (folding seat), in the presence of the king or queen. Whereas the queen had her throne, the filles de France and petite-filles their armchairs, and princesses du sang were entitled to cushioned seats with hard backs, duchesses whose husbands were peers sat, gowned and bejewelled, in a semicircle around the queen and lesser royalties on low, unsteady stools without any back support — and reckoned themselves fortunate among the women of France.

Whereas the wife of a duke-and-peer could use a ployant, other duchesses, domestic or foreign, lacked the prerogative. Yet not only could the wife of any prince étranger claim a tabouret, but so could his daughters and sisters. This distinction was based on the fact that a peer's rank derived, legally, from his position as an officer of the Parlement of Paris, whereas the rank held by a prince derived from a dignity rooted in his sovereign blood line rather than in his function. Thus a duchess-peeress shares in her husband's de jure rank as an official, but that privilege is extended to no other of his family. Yet all daughters and sisters in the legitimate male line of a prince share his blood, and thus his status, as do his wife and the wives of his patrilineage.

The prerogatives of the foreign prince were not automatic. The king's acknowledgement and authorization for each of the associated privileges was required. Some individuals and families claimed entitlement to the rank but never received it. Most notable among these was Prince Eugene of Savoy, whose cold reception at the court of his mother's family drove him into the arms of the Holy Roman Emperor, where he became the martial scourge of France for a generation.

Likewise denied princely precedence was Frédéric Maurice, comte d'Auvergne (1642–1707), the nephew and protégé of Marshal Turenne, who founded a Netherlands branch of the La Tour family through his 1662 marriage to Henrietta of Hohenzollern-Hechingen (1642–1698), Margravine of Bergen-op-Zoom. Although his elder brother ruled Bouillon, his younger brother became Grand Almoner and a cardinal, and Auvergne himself held as sinecures the governorship of Limousin and colonel generalship of the French Light Cavalry, when neither his birth rank nor his wife's Brabantine domain persuaded Louis XIV to allow him precedence before knights of the Order of the Saint Esprit, let alone to share in Bouillon's rank above ducal peers, Auvergne refused to attend the Order's presentations at court.

== List or Foreign Princes habitually at the French Court ==
Name	Title of chief	Date of recognition	Extinction	Arms	Notes
House of Lorraine	Duke of Mercœur	1569	1602		
House of Lorraine	Duke of Guise	1528	1675 (main line of Guise); 1825 (junior line of Elbeuf)		Cadet branches: Dukes of Mayenne (1544), Dukes of Aumale (1547), Dukes of Elbeuf (1581)
House of Savoy	Duke of Nemours	1528	1659		
House of Savoy	Prince of Carignan	1642	extant		
House of La Marck	Duke of Nevers	1538	1565		
House of Gonzaga	Duke of Nevers	1566	1627		The Duke of Nevers inherited the Duchy of Mantua and left the French Court in 1627
House of Grimaldi	Prince of Monaco	1641	1731		The Princes of Monaco were also Dukes of Valentinois in the French Peerage
House of La Tour d'Auvergne	Duke of Bouillon	1651	1802		The Dukes of Bouillon were also Dukes of Albret and Château-Thierry in the French Peerage
House of Rohan	Duke of Montbazon	1651	extant		The House of Rohan-Chabot, female-line heirs of the body of the elder branch of the House of Rohan, is extant, bearing the title Duke of Rohan, but was never acknowledged to be of princely rank.
House of La Trémoille	Duke of Thouars	1651	1933		Female-line heirs-in-exile of the Kings of Naples of the House of Trastámara.

== Equivalents elsewhere ==
The Aga Khan family, though of Persian and Indian origins, are now British citizens. Their princely titles have been recognized by the British Crown since the 1930s.

Their leader, the Aga Khan V, has also been granted the personal style of Highness by King Charles III.
