= Charles III, Duke of Elbeuf =

Charles III
- Duke of Elbeuf
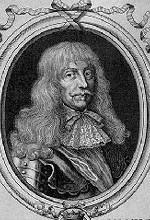
- Born: 1620; Hôtel d'Elboeuf, Paris, France
- Died: 4 May 1692 (aged 71–72); Hôtel d'Elboeuf, Paris, France
- Spouse: Anne Élisabeth de Lannoy; Élisabeth de La Tour d'Auvergne; Françoise de Montault de Navailles
- Issue Detail: Anne Élisabeth, Princess of Vaudémont; Henri, Duke of Elbeuf; Emmanuel Maurice, Duke of Elbeuf; Suzanne Henriette, Duchess of Mantua; Louise Anne, Princess of Navailles
- House: Lorraine
- Father: Charles II, Duke of Elbeuf
- Mother: Catherine Henriette de Bourbon

Charles III (1620 – 4 May 1692) was the third Duke of Elbeuf and member of the House of Lorraine. He succeeded his father Charles II, Duke of Elbeuf, to the Duchy-Peerage of Elbeuf. His mother was an illegitimate daughter of Henry IV of France and Gabrielle d'Estrées. He was also a Peer of France as well as titular Duke of Guise, Count of Harcourt, Lillebonne and Rieux.

== Biography ==
Charles was born at the Hôtel d'Elboeuf in Paris and was the eldest son of Charles II, Duke of Elbeuf, and his wife Catherine Henriette de Bourbon, legitimised daughter of Henry IV of France and Gabrielle d'Estrées.

Charles was known as the Count of Harcourt-Elbeuf while his father was alive; from circa 1650, he styled himself as the prince d'Harcourt, the county of Harcourt being one of the subsidiary titles of his father. He served in Italy (1641) and Picardy (1642) under the command of his uncle Henri, Count of Harcourt. Charles took great part in the Thirty Years' War; he was with le Grand Condé (then the Duke of Enghien) at the famous victory at Rocroi in 1643. Charles was also a part of battles at Thionville and Sierck, as well as the siege of Gravelines (1644); he latter fought in the Battle of Nördlingen (1645) as well as at Trier.

At the death of his father in November 1657, Charles became Duke of Elbeuf as well as a Peer of France. Some time after in 1661, Louis XIV started his personal reign and named Charles as the Governor General of Picardy and Artois, a post his father had previously occupied.

Charles died in Paris aged roughly 61 and was buried at the Église du couvent des Jacobins in Paris. He was succeeded by his third surviving son Henri.

== Issue ==
Charles married three times; firstly to Countess Anne Élisabeth de Lannoy (1626–1654), daughter of Count Charles de Lannoy; the couple married on 7 March 1648;

1. Anne Élisabeth of Lorraine (6 August 1649 – 5 August 1714) known as Mademoiselle d'Elbeuf, she married Charles Henri de Lorraine, a distant cousin and illegitimate son of Charles IV, Duke of Lorraine, and had issue: Charles Thomas, Prince of Vaudémont.
2. Charles of Lorraine, Chevalier d'Elboeuf (2 November 1650 – 1690), never married;

Secondly Charles married Princess Élisabeth de La Tour d'Auvergne (daughter of the Duke of Bouillon and sister of Godefroy Maurice de La Tour d'Auvergne) on 20 May 1656 and had six children;

1. Henri Frédéric of Lorraine, Count of Islebonne (26 January 1657 – 21 October 1666) died in infancy;
2. Marie Eléonore of Lorraine (24 February 1658 – March 1731), Abbess of Saint Jacques;
3. Marie Françoise de Lorraine (5 May 1659 – ?), Abbess of Saint Germaine;
4. Henri of Lorraine, Duke of Elbeuf (7 August 1661 – 17 May 1748) married Charlotte de Rochechouart de Mortemart, daughter of Louis Victor de Rochechouart de Mortemart, niece of Madame de Montespan and had issue;
5. Louis of Lorraine, Abbot of Orcamp (18 September 1662 – 4 February 1693) had illegitimate issue;
6. Emmanuel Maurice of Lorraine, Duke of Elbeuf (30 December 1677 – 17 July 1763), married twice but no issue; at his death the Duchy of Elbeuf went to Charles Eugène de Lorraine, prince de Lambesc;

Thirdly, Charles married Françoise de Montault de Navailles, daughter of Philippe de Montaut-Bénac, Duke de Navailles, on 25 August 1684;

1. Suzanne Henriette of Lorraine (1 February 1686 – 19 October 1710) married Ferdinand Charles, Duke of Mantua and Montferrat, no issue;
2. Louise Anne of Lorraine, Princess of Navailles (10 July 1689 – 1762) never married.

Charles also had three illegitimate children, including Charles bâtard de Lorraine (1645–1708), no surviving issue.

== Ancestry ==
Ancestors of Charles III, Duke of Elbeuf

8. René, Marquis of Elbeuf
4. Charles I, Duke of Elbeuf
9. Louise de Rieux
2. Charles II, Duke of Elbeuf
10. Léonor Chabot, Count of Charny
5. Marguerite de Chabot
11. Françoise de Rye, Dame of Longwy
1. Charles III, Duke of Elbeuf
12. Antoine of Navarre
6. Henry IV of France
13. Jeanne III of Navarre
3. Catherine Henriette de Bourbon
14. Antoine d'Estrées, Marquis of Coeuvres
7. Gabrielle d'Estrées
15. Françoise Babou de La Bourdaisière

== Sources ==
- Spangler, Jonathan (2009). The Society of Princes: The Lorraine-Guise and the Conservation of Power and Wealth in Seventeenth-Century France. Ashgate Publishing.
- Georges Poull, La maison ducale de Lorraine, 1991
