= Elbeuf =

- Commune
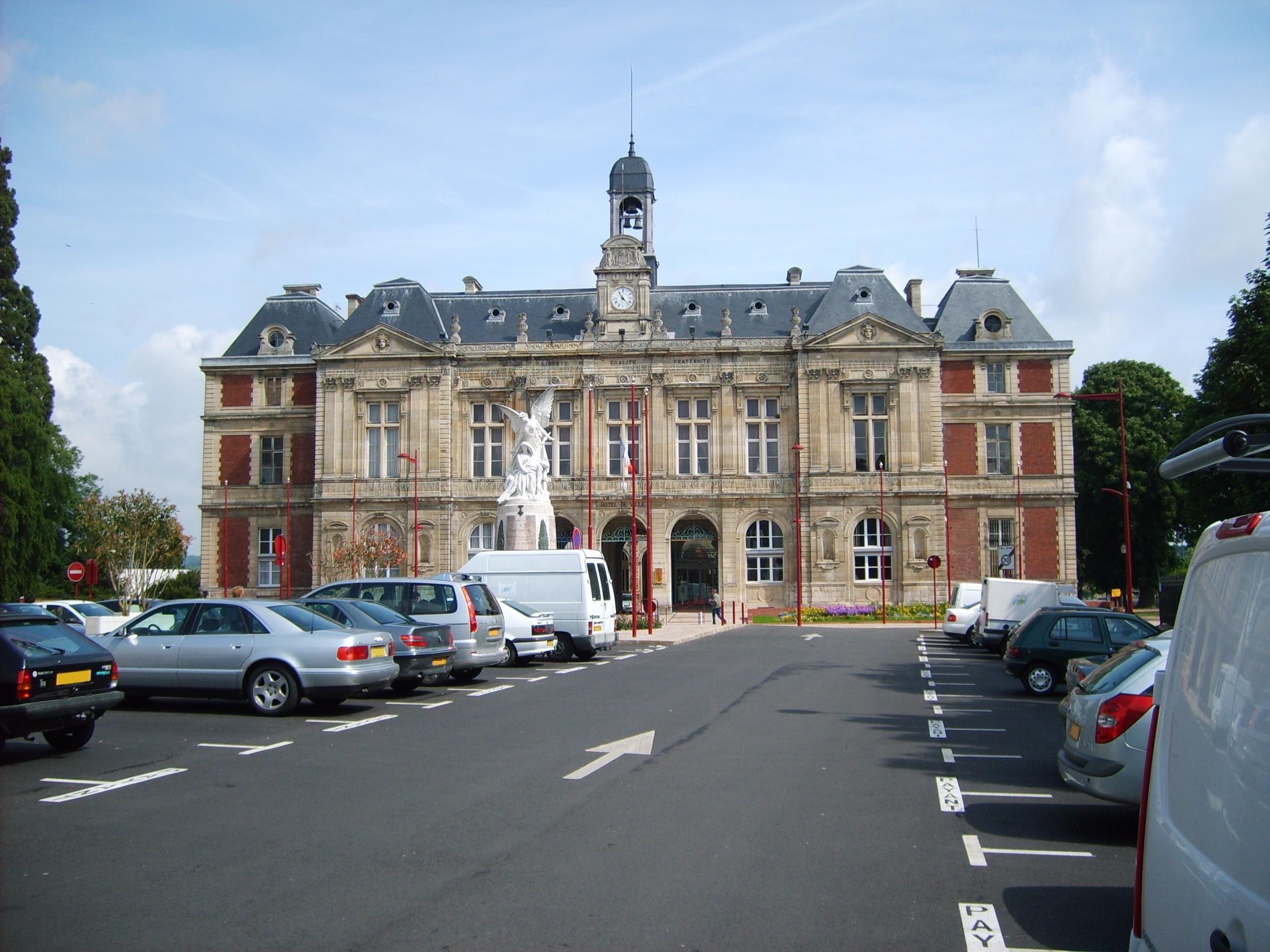
- Town hall

- Coat of arms
- Location of Elbeuf
- Location within France Location within Normandy
- Coordinates: 49°17′N 1°01′E
- Country: France
- Region: Normandy
- Department: Seine-Maritime
- Arrondissement: Rouen
- Canton: Elbeuf
- Intercommunality: Métropole Rouen Normandie

Government
  - Mayor (2026–32): Djoudé Merabet
- Area^{1}: 16.32 km^{2} (6.30 sq mi)
- Elevation: 50 m (160 ft)
- Highest elevation: 133 m (436 ft)
- Lowest elevation: 2 m (6.6 ft)
- Population (2023): 15,474
  - Density: 948.2/km^{2} (2,456/sq mi)
- Time zone: UTC+01:00 (CET)
  - Summer (DST): UTC+02:00 (CEST)
- INSEE/Postal code: 76231 /76500
- ^{1} French Land Register data, which excludes lakes, ponds, glaciers > 1 km^{2} (0.386 sq mi or 247 acres) and river estuaries.

Elbeuf (French pronunciation: [ɛlbœf]) is a commune in the Seine-Maritime department in the Normandy region in northern France.

== Geography ==
A light industrial town situated by the banks of the Seine some 11 miles (18 km) south of Rouen at the junction of the D7, D321 and the D313 roads. The commune's territory is largely residential to the north but the southern section is covered by thick woodland. Its position by a meander of the Seine leaves the town susceptible to flooding.

== History ==
The first written record of the town was in the 10th century, on a map of Richard I of Normandy, under the name "Wellebou". It passed into the hands of the houses of Rieux and Lorraine, and was raised to the rank of a duchy in the peerage of France by Henry III in favour of Charles de Lorraine. The last duke of Elbeuf was Charles Eugène of Lorraine.

The population in 1841 was 14,646 inhabitants.

=== Heraldry ===
Arms of Elbeuf	The arms of Elbeuf are blazoned : Per pale: 1 Or, a patriarchal cross gules issuant from a base, supporting a grapevine vert fructed purpure, 2 Azure, a beehive Or on a base vert, beset by bees Or.

== Population ==
Historical population
Year	Pop.	±% p.a.
1968	19,407	—
1975	19,116	−0.22%
1982	17,224	−1.48%
1990	16,604	−0.46%
1999	16,666	+0.04%
2007	16,975	+0.23%
2012	17,315	+0.40%
2017	16,166	−1.36%
2023	15,474	−0.73%
Source: INSEE

== Places of interest ==
- The mairie, also housing the museum.
- Two seventeenth-century churches.
- Some sixteenth-century houses.
- Elbeuf corp headquarters.
- A fifteenth-century stone cross.
- The theatre (1890), renovated in the late twentieth century.

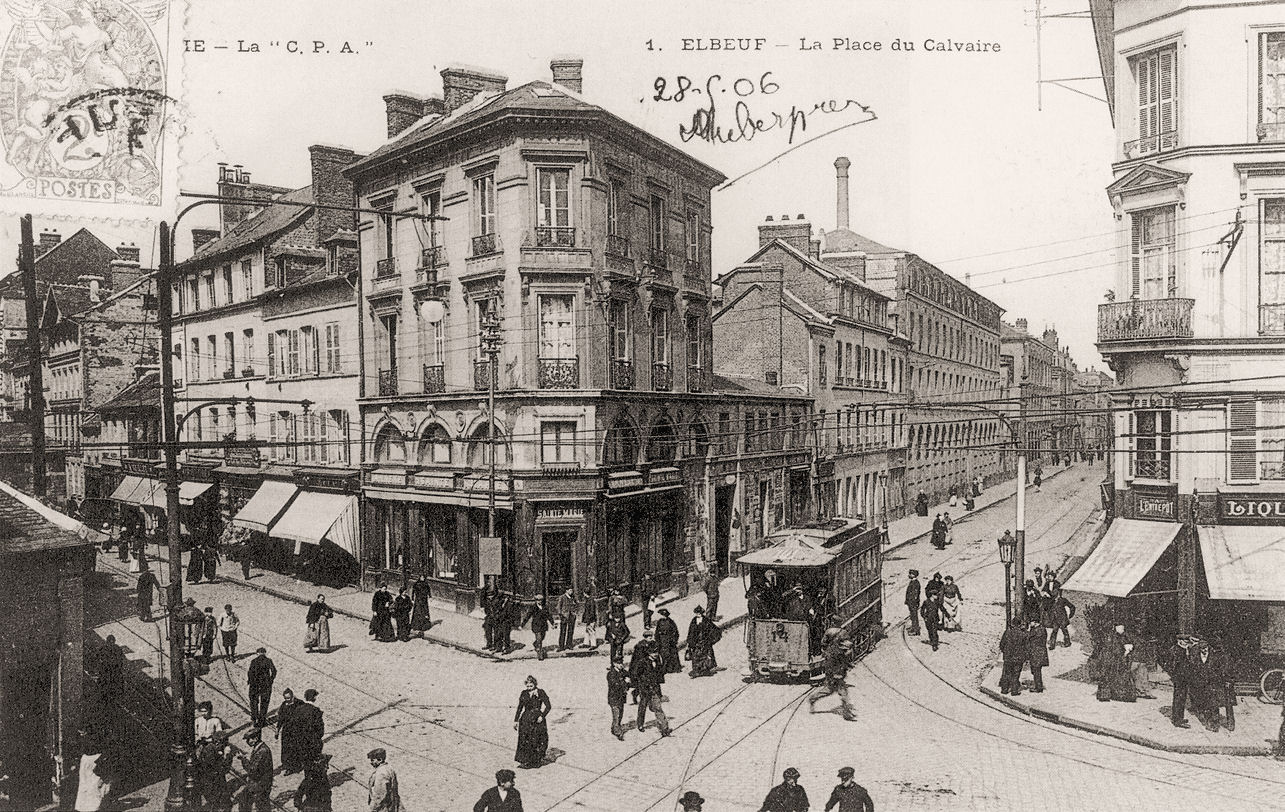
Place du Calvaire and the Tramway around 1900

== Education ==
Preschools include Brassens, Daudet, LeFrancois, Malraux, Moliere, and Prevert. Elementary schools include Brassens, Condorcet, Daudet, Michelet, Moliere, and Mouchel. The area public junior high school is Collège public Nelson Mandela. The area public senior high schools/sixth-form colleges are Lycée André Maurois and Lycée Ferdinand Buisson. There is a private junior-senior high school, Groupe scolaire Fénelon, and a private senior high school, Lycée professionnel privé Notre-Dame. For post-secondary, there is a University technical institute programme available.

== Notable people ==
- Raoul Grimoin-Sanson, cinematography inventor, was born here.
- André Maurois (né Émile Salomon Wilhelm Herzog), novelist, member of the Académie française
- David Vigor was born here and was a member of the Australian Senate, representing the Australian Democrats and the Unite Australia Party

== Twin towns ==
Lingen, Germany

== See also ==
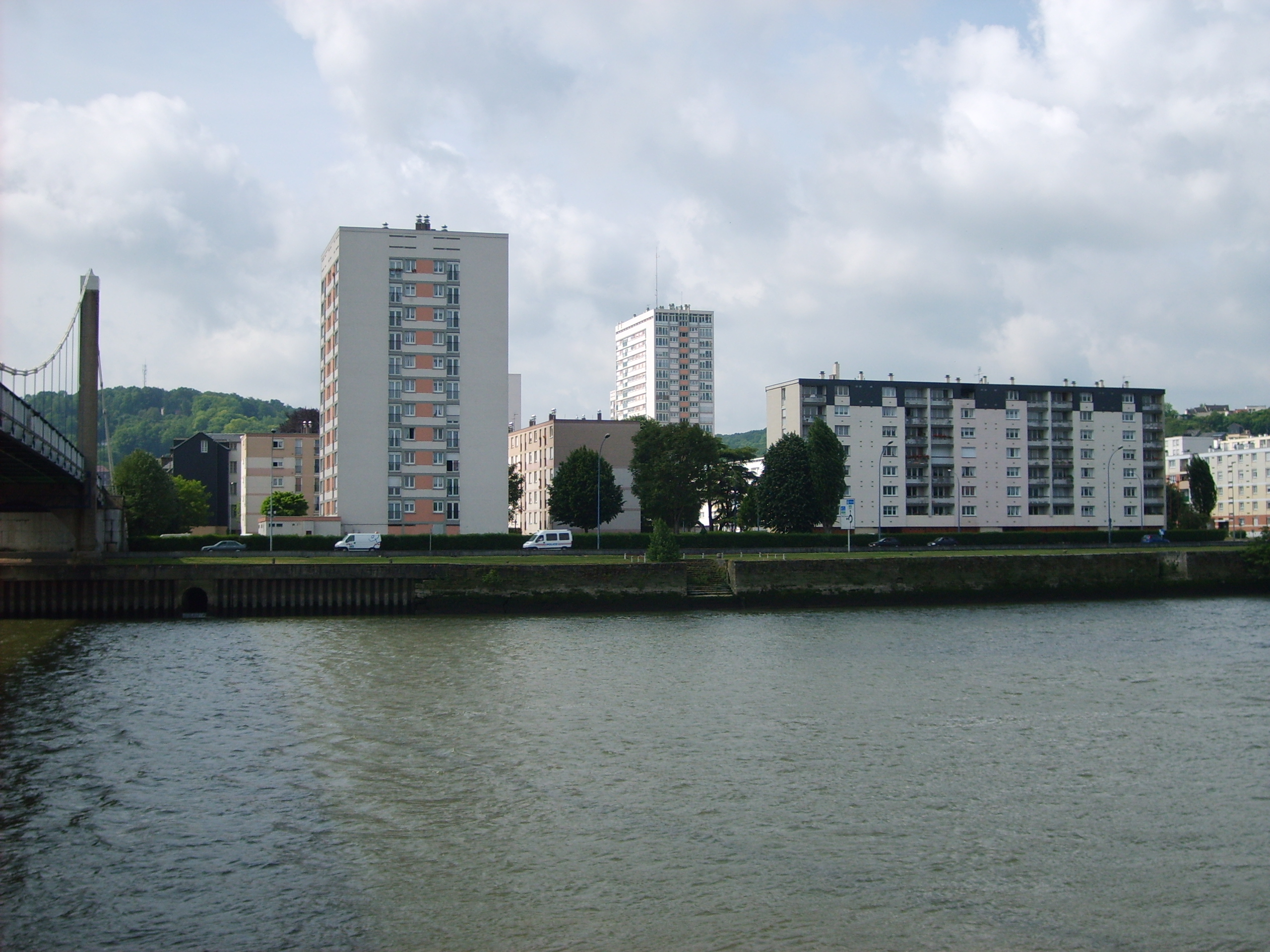
Elbeuf - Quartier du Puchot

- List of rulers of Elbeuf
- Communes of the Seine-Maritime department
