= Lords, Marquesses and Dukes of Elbeuf =

The Seigneurie of Elbeuf, later a marquisate, dukedom, and peerage, was based on the territory of Elbeuf in the Vexin, possessed first by the counts of Valois and then the counts of Meulan before passing to the House of Harcourt. In 1265, it was erected into a seigneurie for them. Occupied by the English from 1419 to 1444, it passed by marriage to the Lorraine-Vaudémont, a cadet branch of the sovereign House of Lorraine, in 1452. When René of Vaudémont inherited Lorraine, he left the Harcourt inheritance, including Elbeuf, to his second son Claude, Duke of Guise. Elbeuf was raised to a marquisate in 1528. Claude, in turn, left Elbeuf to his youngest son René. It was elevated to a ducal peerage in 1581 for his son Charles, and the title became extinct in 1825.

== Lords of Elbeuf (1265) ==
=== House of Harcourt ===
- John I of Harcourt (1265–1288)
- John II of Harcourt (1288–1302), also Lord of Harcourt
- John III of Harcourt (1302–1329), also Lord of Harcourt
- John IV of Harcourt (1329–1346), also Count of Harcourt
- John V of Harcourt (1346–1355), also Count of Harcourt and Aumale
- John VI of Harcourt (1355–1389), also Count of Harcourt and Aumale
- John VII of Harcourt (1389–1419), also Count of Harcourt and Aumale

=== English lords ===
- Thomas of Lancaster, 1st Duke of Clarence (1419–1421)
- John of Lancaster, 1st Duke of Bedford (1421–1425)
- Thomas Beaufort, 1st Duke of Exeter (1425–1426)
- John Beaufort, 1st Duke of Somerset (1426–1444)

=== House of Harcourt (restored) ===
- John VII of Harcourt (1444–1452), also Count of Harcourt and Aumale
- Marie of Harcourt (1452–1476), married Antoine, Count of Vaudémont

=== House of Lorraine ===
- Antoine, Count of Vaudémont (1452–1458) (with Marie)
- John of Vaudémont (1458–1473) (with Marie), also Count of Harcourt and Aumale
- René II, Duke of Lorraine (1473–1508) (with Marie 1473–1476)
- Claude, Duke of Guise (1508–1528)

== Marquises of Elbeuf (1528) ==
- Claude, Duke of Guise (1528–1550)
- René, Marquis of Elbeuf (1550–1566)
- Charles, Marquis of Elbeuf (1566–1582)

== Dukes of Elbeuf (1582) ==
- Charles I, Duke of Elbeuf (1582–1605)
- Charles II, Duke of Elbeuf (1605–1657)
- Charles III, Duke of Elbeuf (1657–1692) father-in-law to Charles IV, Duke of Mantua
- Henry, Duke of Elbeuf (1692–1748)
- Emmanuel Maurice, Duke of Elbeuf (1748–1763)
- Charles-Eugène, Duke of Elbeuf (1763–1825)
