= René II, Marquis of Elbeuf =

French noble and soldier

René II de Lorraine
- baron d'Elbeuf marquis d'Elbeuf comte d'Harcourt
- Elbeuf's coat of arms
- Born: 14 August 1536; Joinville
- Died: 14 December 1566 (aged 30); Provence
- Noble family: House of Guise
- Spouse: Louise de Rieux
- Issue: Charles de Lorraine, Duc d'Elbeuf; Marie de Lorraine
- Father: Claude, Duke of Guise
- Mother: Antoinette de Bourbon-Vendôme

René II de Lorraine, Marquis d'Elbeuf (14 August 1536 – 14 December 1566) was a French noble and soldier during the latter Italian Wars and early French Wars of Religion. The youngest son of Claude de Lorraine, Duke of Guise and Antoinette de Bourbon-Vendôme Elbeuf's career began at a young age. With the resumption of the Italian Wars in 1551, he joined Marshal Brissac in his siege of Chieri. In the following years he would be involved in the expedition that seized Corsica, and a further campaign in Italy in 1557, before playing a key role in the capture of Calais in early 1558. Though only the sixth son of the late duke, an advantageous marriage was secured for him with the prominent heiress Louise de Rieux through which he gained much of the County of Harcourt. In tandem with this arrangement his barony was elevated to a marquisate.

With the death of Henry II in 1559, the Guise regime that followed desired to assert itself in Scotland. To this end Elbeuf was tasked with leading an expedition, however the preparations foundered, and by June 1560 peace would be agreed with England. In the following years he spent time with his niece Mary in Scotland before returning to France with the outbreak of the French Wars of Religion. In March 1563, he would surrender the fortress of Caen to the Protestant general Admiral Coligny, revitalising Protestant fortunes in Normandy shortly before peace. Over the following years he worked with his brothers in the prosecution of their feud with the Admiral, who they blamed for the assassination of the Duke of Guise, participating in their armed entrance into Paris in 1565. The following year he would die in Provence.

== Early life and family ==
=== Childhood ===
René was born at Joinville, Haute-Marne in 1536, the sixth son of Claude, Duke of Guise and Antoinette de Bourbon. Only fourteen years old at the death of his father in 1550. It was agreed that like Claude, Duke of Aumale he would be established as a Norman lord, receiving the inheritance of the barony of Elbeuf. For now he was too young to rule it and it set aside for him, while he stayed at Joinville under the wardship of his mother. Antoinette would administer his estates during his youth, and further prosecute the struggle in the Parlement of Paris for the elevation of the barony of Elbeuf into a marquisate.

As Elbeuf's tutor she selected Charles des Boves to replace the recently deceased Etienne de Morainville, who was reputed to have provided his charge with a 'good and wise education'.

In return for the privileges he acquired, it was expected that he would be deferential to his older brothers and mother. He allowed his mother to pick the members of his household, meanwhile his gendarmerie company was to be selected by his brothers. He was a patron of the arts, particularly of the composer Pierre Clereau of Lorraine. The poet Remy Belleau followed Elbeuf on his campaign into Italy in 1557, and he became the man's patron over the next several years until Belleau's conversion to Protestantism in 1560.

=== Marriage and children ===
He married Louise de Rieux (1531 – c. 1570) on 3 February 1555. This marriage was considered very impressive for a sixth son, as she was an heiress to a considerable estate. Henry II felt it was improper for a woman of her status to marry a baron, and as such raised the barony of Elbeuf to a marquisate. As part of the dowry, Louise brought parts of the County of Harcourt making him a powerful Norman magnate.

They had two children:

- Charles de Lorraine, Duc d'Elbeuf (1556–1605)
- Marie de Lorraine (21 August 1555 – 21 August 1605), styled Mademoiselle d'Elbeuf, married at Joinville on 10 November 1576 Charles de Lorraine-Guise, Duc d'Aumale and had issue.

== Reign of Henry II ==
At the funeral of François I, the 11 year old Elbeuf carried the royal sceptre for the proceedings, while his brother the Grand Prior carried the king's crown.

=== Italian wars ===
Elbeuf participated in the opening campaign of the final period of the Italian Wars, joining Brissac in Piedmont in preparation for the invasion in favour of the duke of Parma. Instead of defending the city of Parma when it came under siege, Brissac instead sought to draw off the Imperial army, successfully reducing the town of Chieri before engaging in inconclusive skirmishing for the remainder of the year. While Imperial and French forces engaged during 1551, formal war between France and the Empire would not resume until 1552.

=== Promotion ===
Together with his brother the Grand Prior, Elbeuf was involved in the 1553 capture of Corse led by Paul de Thermes. This proved to be the solitary French success in a year of military failure.

Upon the death in 1554 of Leone Strozzi, prior of the Order of Malta for Capua and commander of the order's galleys. Elbeuf received the honour of assuming his role with the order. In total this was a fleet of 42 galleys, harboured in Toulon and Marseille granting him a sizable presence in the Mediterranean.

=== Ascendency ===
Afforded his long desired campaign in Italy, Guise set off in November 1556 with his brothers Aumale and Elbeuf providing military support to his campaign. He was unable to achieve much of note in Italy in early 1557. In the wake of Constable Montmorency's capture after the disastrous battle of Saint-Quentin in 1557. The Guise were ascendant in government. Keen to take advantage, Elbeuf hurried to court, arriving a week after the Duke of Guise became lieutenant-general of the kingdom. In his new position of total military authority, Guise sort to reclaim French honour through capturing Calais, which had been in English hands since 1347 and was heavily defended. Elbeuf and Aumale joined him for his winter attack on the city and both were to play a key role in holding a castle after it was secured. With Guise having left to return to camp, Elbeuf and Aumale led the defenders of the castle in withstanding two ferocious attempts by the English to recapture the fortification. Unable to achieve victory in this endeavour, the English soon surrendered on 8 January, Guise had pulled off a major coup, seizing a city in weeks that had resisted French control for over one hundred years. As a reward for his role in the capture, Elbeuf received a gift of 12,000 livres.

== Reign of François II ==
=== Scottish enterprise ===
In 1559, Lorraine was hopeful that Elbeuf would soon be able to be sent to Scotland, to support Marie de Guise's regime against the increasing Protestant tenor of the country. However the death of Henry II that year, would jeopardise these plans. Nevertheless, in December Elbeuf received a commission to go to Scotland as "viceroy", as Marie contemplated resigning the Regency of Scotland and a return to France. Poor weather forced his ship back when he tried to travel to the country on 21 December. Many of his ships made it through however, and as such Marie was reinforced by 900 men, though the very fact of this was preyed on by her opponents in the country as a foreign occupation. Elbeuf meanwhile took up residence in Dieppe, where the Protestant minority which was strong in the town found their worship proscribed for the next several months before departing south in March.

Elizabeth I on hearing of Elbeuf's appointment as lieutenant in Scotland, decided to act; sending William Wynter to blockade Leith in February 1560, and entering into an alliance with Marie's opponents, the Lords of the Congregation, by the Treaty of Berwick. In May, Elbeuf made another attempt to reach Scotland, this time alongside the rehabilitated governor of Normandy the Duke of Bouillon. Also in attendance for this second expedition were Aumale and Villebon bailli of Rouen. Admiral Coligny came to Le Havre to offer his assistance in preparations. All was not well however, François de Coligny d'Andelot refused to embark his men in the ships being prepared at Marseille, and many others followed his example. In June peace was made with England, negating the need for the expedition, the peace was largely forced on France by lack of funds and the problems with sailors.

== Reign of Charles IX ==
Upon the death of François II, the Guise hold over the government of France was shattered. As a result, a new government was formed for the still minor Charles IX under his mother Catherine de Medici. This reconfiguration of royal favour left little place for the Guise, and Elbeuf was among those who departed court in January 1561 in response, leaving alongside his brothers Aumale, the Grand Prior and Cardinal Guise.

=== In Scotland ===
Elbeuf joined Mary, Queen of Scots when she returned to Scotland in September 1561. With Lord John, Lord Robert, and others, he performed in a tournament on the sands of Leith in December 1561, probably to celebrate the queen's birthday. There was "running at the ring", with two teams of six men, one team dressed as women, the other as exotic foreigners in strange masquing garments. The English diplomat Thomas Randolph wrote that Elbeuf had sent to France for his tournament armour and his skill at the "ring" was commendable.

According to the chronicle of Robert Lindsay of Pitscottie, Elbeuf was impressed by the variety of Scottish produce served at the banquets in February 1562 to celebrate the wedding of the queen's half-brother, Lord James Stewart and Agnes Keith. The feasts included wild venison, poultry, and "all other kind of delicate wild beasts".

Soon after the wedding, Elbeuf was involved in a disturbance in Edinburgh that started as a kind of masque in the town. He and the Earl of Bothwell and Lord John went to the house where Alison Craik, a merchant's daughter and mistress of the Earl of Arran was lodged. When they were not admitted they broke down the doors. There were complaints to the queen and she issued a reprimand. Bothwell and Lord John ignored this and the next day there was a face-off between their followers and the Hamiltons in the market place. Elbeuf returned to France via the English court. Mary considered asking him to take her gift of a ring with a heart-shaped diamond to Elizabeth I, but decided to wait for another occasion.

=== First war of religion ===
In April 1562 Protestants had seized the city of Rouen for the rebel war effort. The following month excursions from the city raided Elbeuf's lands which were situated very close to the city. While Protestant fortunes in the first war of religion had reached a low ebb after the loss at the Battle of Dreux in December, Coligny engaged in a lightning campaign in Normandy in early 1563 seizing back many towns that had fallen to the crown, with little royal forces available to stop him. He began an assault on the castle of Caen on 1 March 1563, the next day Elbeuf who was inside surrendered it, and thus the town.

=== Assassination of the duke of Guise ===
After the assassination of the Duke of Guise, the Guise family blamed Admiral Coligny for having arranged the attack. Resultingly they decided to open a feud with the Admiral. At first this was prosecuted through legal channels, however the king little desired to see the two leading families of his realm at each other's throats, and as such he shut down the attempt. Hoping to isolate the Montmorency, the Guise engaged in a charm offensive towards the Prince of Condé, hoping to detach him from his co-religionists. By September 1565 the English ambassador reported on the friendly relations the prince held with Elbeuf and the Cardinal of Guise. In response to their legal failures however, the Guise family also turned to extra-legal means. To this end they planned a show of force in Paris, which was governed by the cousin of the Admiral, François de Montmorency. Montmorency prohibited any armed entrances into the city but this was ignored, and Lorraine entered the city via one gate, while Aumale and Elbeuf approached through the other. Lorraine was faced with intense opposition from the forces under Montmorency and his ally the Prince de Porcien. Aumale and Elbeuf meanwhile entered uncontested, but after a brief time spent in the suburbs without achieving much, decided to depart. Lorraine had been humiliated in his engagement and hounded by citizens of Paris as he retreated to his residence. The show of force had been a complete failure.

=== Death ===
Recently installed in Provence in his capacity as commander of the Mediterranean fleet, he died in 1566, a heavy blow for the Guise family. In the wake of his death the young Duke of Guise and Charles, Duke of Mayenne decided to depart the country, going on Crusade in Hungary.

== Sources ==
- Baumgartner, Frederic (1988). Henry II: King of France 1547-1559. Duke University Press.
- Carroll, Stuart (2005). Noble Power during the French Wars of Religion: The Guise Affinity and the Catholic Cause in Normandy. Cambridge University Press.
- Carroll, Stuart (2009). Martyrs and Murderers: The Guise Family and the Making of Europe. Oxford University Press.
- Cloulas, Ivan (1985). Henri II. Fayard.
- Jouanna, Arlette (1998). Histoire et Dictionnaire des Guerres de Religion. Bouquins.
- Salmon, J.H.M (1975). Society in Crisis: France during the Sixteenth Century. Metheun & Co.
- Thompson, James (1909). The Wars of Religion in France 1559-1576: The Huguenots, Catherine de Medici and Philip II. Chicago University Press.

French nobility
Preceded by Claude	Marquis d'Elbeuf; 1550–1566	Succeeded by Charles
