= Charles II, Duke of Elbeuf =

Charles II
- Duke of Elbeuf
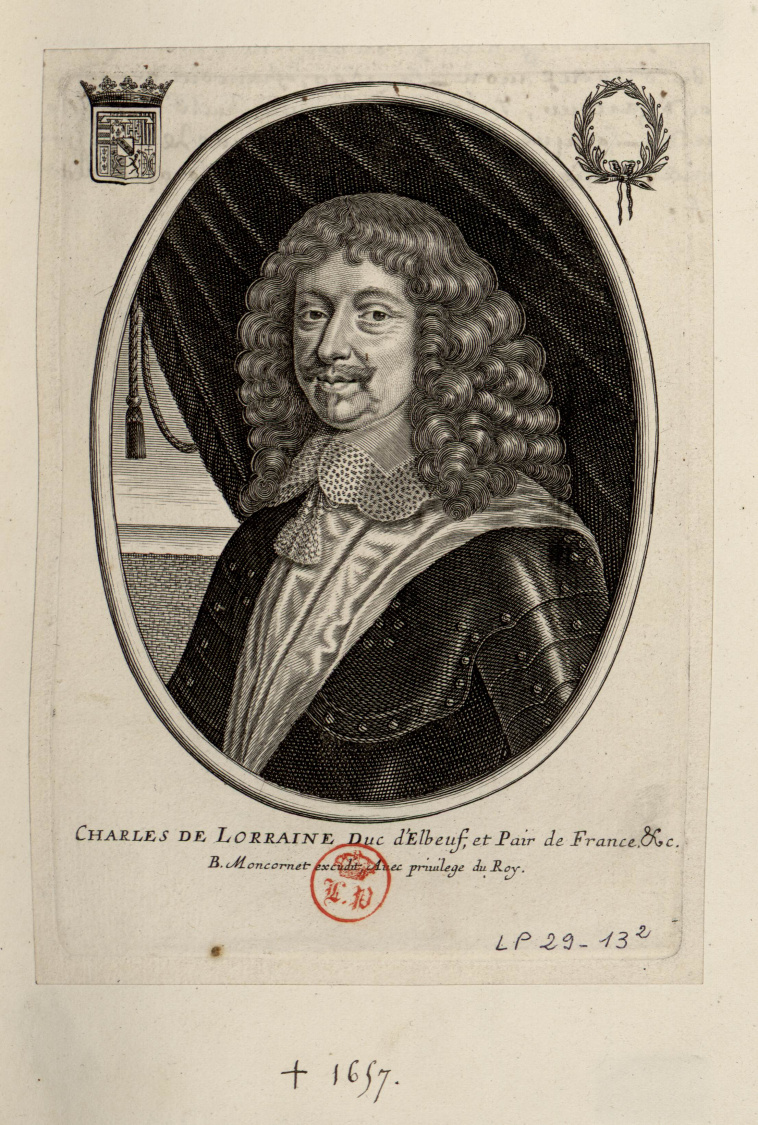
- Born: 5 November 1596; Paris, France
- Died: 5 November 1657 (aged 61); Hôtel d'Elbœuf, Paris, France
- Spouse: Catherine Henriette de Bourbon
- Issue Detail: Charles III, Duke of Elbeuf; François Louis, Count of Harcourt; François Marie, Prince of Lillebonne
- House: Lorraine
- Father: Charles I, Duke of Elbeuf
- Mother: Marguerite de Chabot

Charles II, Duke of Elbeuf (5 November 1596 – 5 November 1657), was a French nobleman, the son of Charles I, Duke of Elbeuf, by his wife, Marguerite de Chabot. He succeeded his father in the Elbeuf dukedom (Elbœuf is an alternate, anglicized spelling) in 1605.

== Biography ==
Charles joined the French royal court in 1607, becoming a playmate to the future King Louis XIII. When the latter reached his majority, Charles was appointed Grand Chamberlain of France. He was a loyal servant to the King, of assistance in conflicts with Marie de' Medici, Cardinal Richelieu, and the Huguenots. The Duke of Longueville, governor of Normandy, and loyal to Queen Marie, led a revolt against the king and established camps at Orival, near Elbeuf. The king and Richelieu were the main targets of the revolt, and Charles was appointed governor of Normandy. He took part in the siege of Rochelle, but was wounded at Saint-Jean-d'Angély. He was given the additional post of governor of Picardy.

He died at Paris in 1657.

== Marriage and children ==
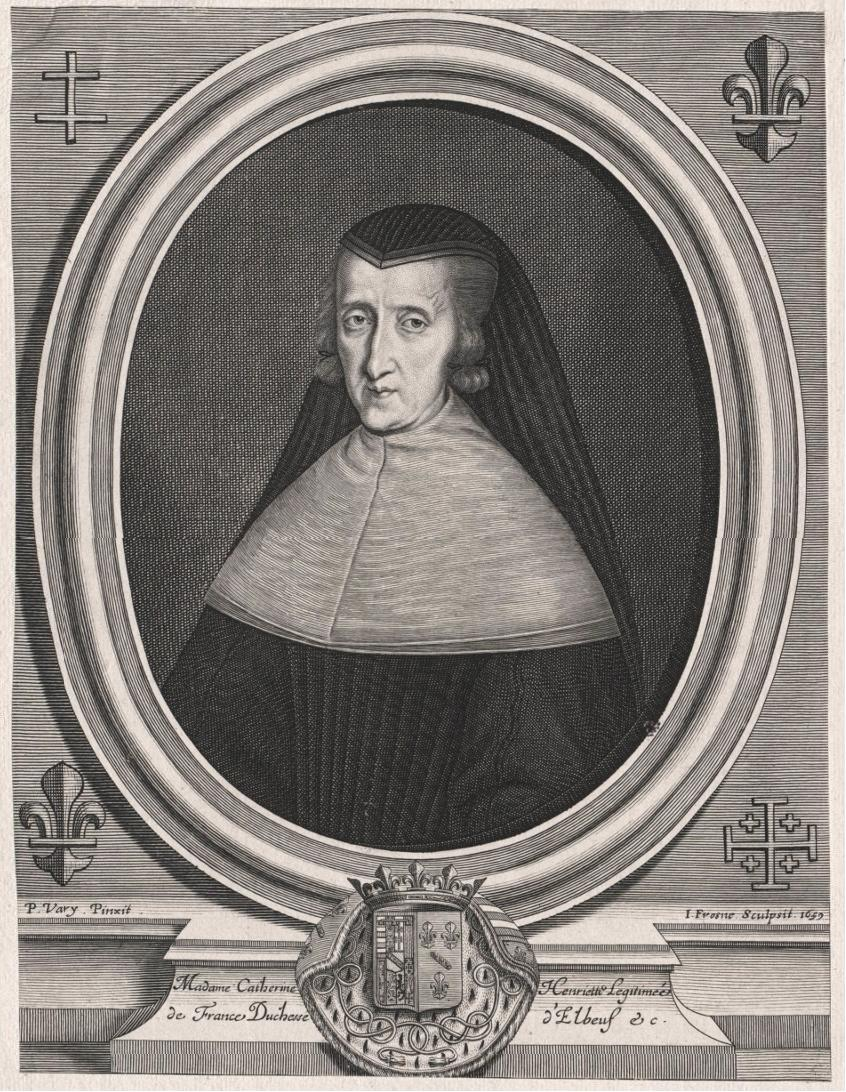
Catherine Henriette de Bourbon, Légitimée de France

On 20 June 1619 he married Catherine Henriette de Bourbon, called Mademoiselle de Vendôme, an illegitimate daughter of King Henry IV of France by Gabrielle d'Estrées. They had:

- Charles III of Elbeuf (1620 – 4 May 1692)
- Henri (1622 – 3 April 1648) never married; Abbot of Hombieres
- François Louis, Count of Harcourt (1623 – 27 June 1694)
- François Marie, Prince of Lillebonne (4 April 1624 – 19 January 1694)
- Catherine (1626–1645)
- Marie Marguerite (1629 – 7 August 1679) known as Mademoiselle d'Elbœuf

Child with Jeanne-Françoise Schotte (family, Van den Gersmoortere alias Schotte, the lords of Herbais):

- Charlotte Françoise Adrienne, born 1638

== Sources ==
- Spangler, Jonathan (2009). The Society of Princes: The Lorraine-Guise and the Conservation of Power and Wealth in Seventeenth-Century France. Ashgate Publishing Limited. ISBN 978-0-7546-5860-3.
