= Catherine Henriette de Bourbon =

- Légitimée de France; Duchess of Elbeuf
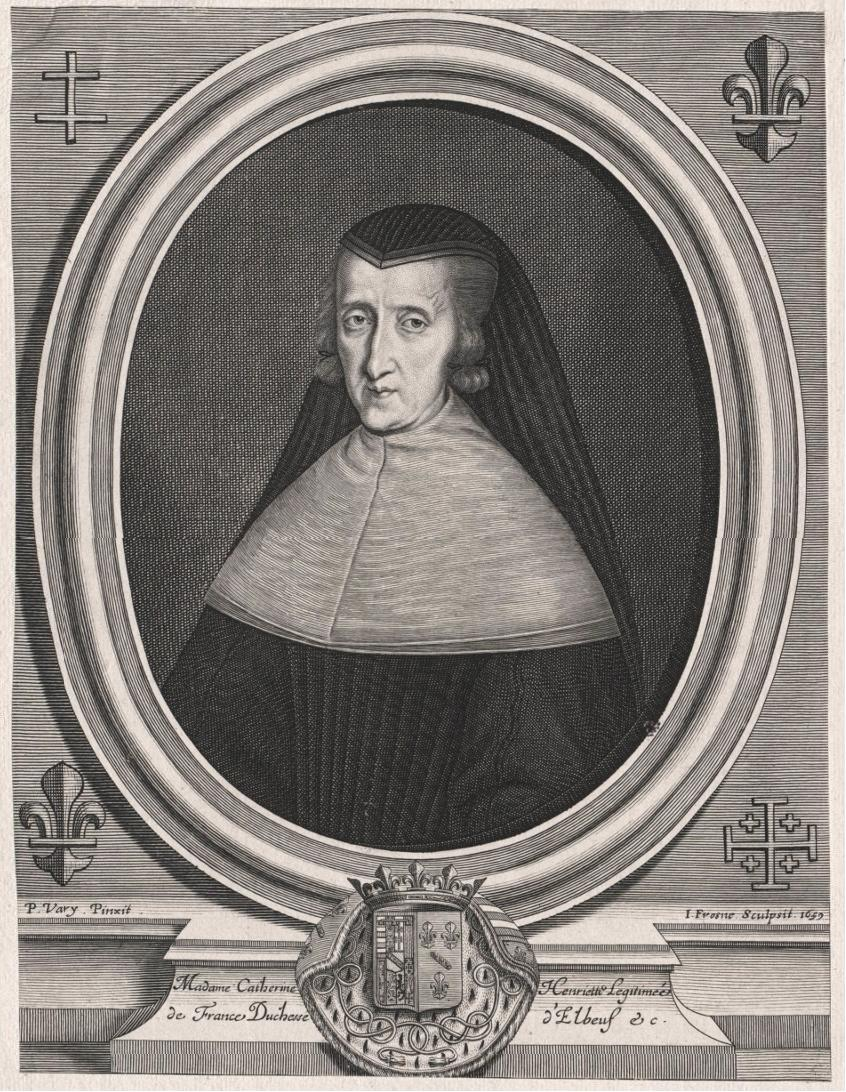
- Catherine in 1659 as a widow, by P Vary
- Born: 11 November 1596; Rouen, France
- Died: 20 June 1663 (aged 67); Hôtel d'Elboeuf, Paris, France
- Spouse: Charles II, Duke of Elbeuf
- Issue Detail: Charles III, Duke of Elbeuf; François Louis, Count of Harcourt; François Marie, Prince of Lillebonne
Names
- Catherine Henriette de Bourbon, Légitimée de France
- House: Bourbon
- Father: Henry IV of France
- Mother: Gabrielle d'Estrées

Catherine Henriette de Bourbon (also Catherine Henrietta de Vendôme, Duchesse d'Elbeuf) (11 November 1596 – 20 June 1663) was an illegitimate daughter of King Henry IV of France and his long-term maîtresse en titre Gabrielle d'Estrées. She was declared legitimate on 17 November 1596 at the Abbey of St. Ouen in Rouen and married into the Princely House of Guise. In 1619 she married Charles de Lorraine, Duc d'Elbeuf.

== Issue ==
- Charles III of Elbeuf (1620 – 4 May 1692)
- Henri (1622 – 3 April 1648) never married; Abbot of Hombieres
- François Louis, Count of Harcourt (1623 – 27 June 1694), married and had issue;
- François Marie, Prince of Lillebonne (4 April 1624 – 19 January 1694); married and had issue
- Catherine (1626–1645)
- Marie Marguerite (1629 – 7 August 1679) known as Mademoiselle d'Elboeuf; died unmarried and childless

== Sources ==
- Gerber, Matthew (2012). Bastards: Politics, Family, and Law in Early Modern France. Oxford University Press.
- Pitts, Vincent J. (2009). Henri IV of France: His Reign and Age. The Johns Hopkins University Press.
- Spangler, Jonathan (2009). The Society of Princes; the Lorraine-Guise and the conservation of power and wealth in the Seventeenth Century. Ashgate.
