= Claude, Duke of Guise =

French aristocrat, 1st Duke of Giuse (1496–1550)

Claude de Lorraine
- Marquis of Elbeuf; Duke of Guise
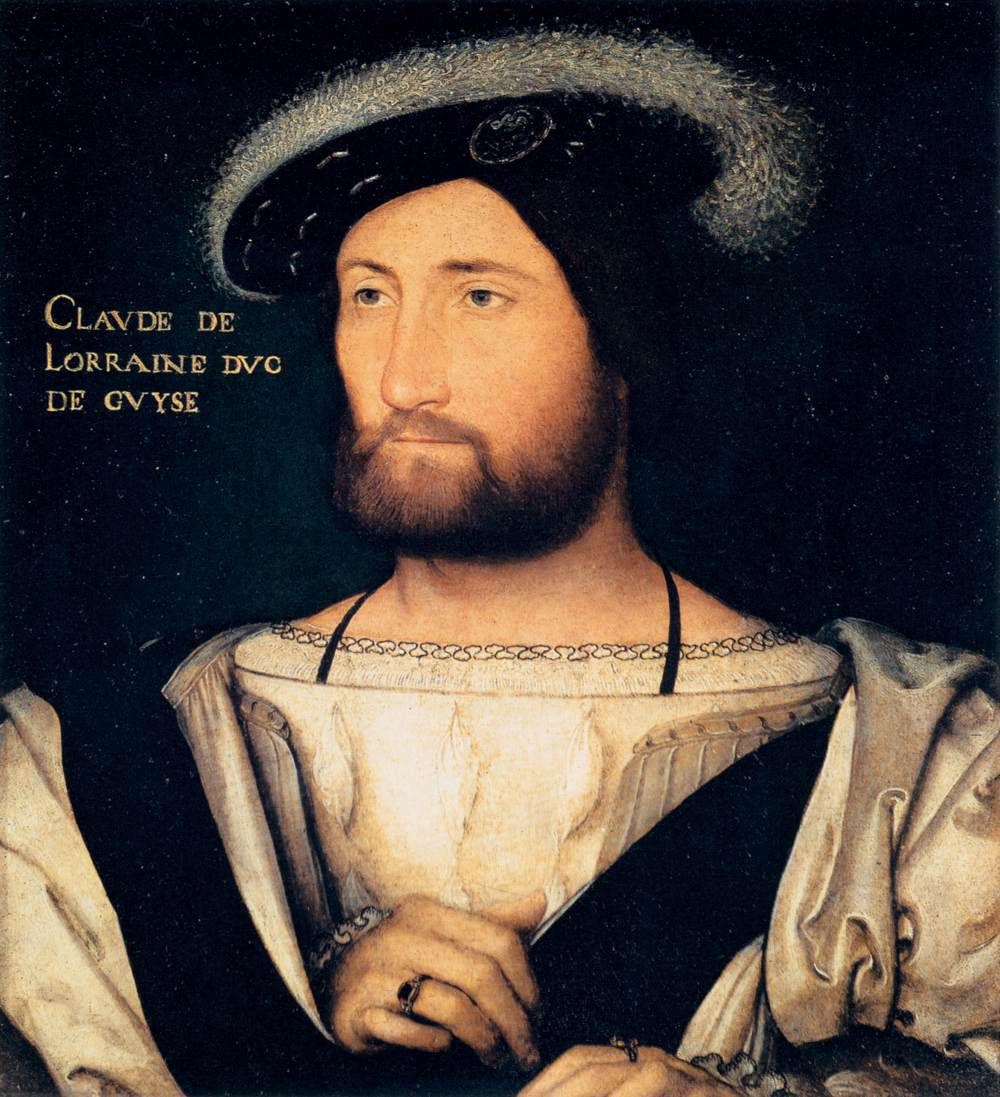
- Portrait by Jean Clouet

Count / Duke of Guise
- Tenure: 10 December 1508 – 12 April 1550
- Successor: Francis
- Born: 20 October 1496; Château de Custines
- Died: 12 April 1550 (aged 53); Château de Joinville
- Spouse: Antoinette de Bourbon (m. 1513)
- Issue: Marie, Queen of Scotland; Francis, Duke of Guise; Renée, Abbess of St. Pierre; Charles, Archbishop of Reims; Claude, Duke of Aumale; Louis I, Cardinal of Guise; Antoinette, Abbess of Faremoutier; Francis, Grand Prior of the Order of Malta; René, Marquis of Elbeuf
- House: Guise
- Father: René II, Duke of Lorraine
- Mother: Philippa of Guelders

Coat of arms of the Duke of Guise

Claude de Lorraine, Duke of Guise (20 October 1496 – 12 April 1550) was a French aristocrat and general. He became the first Duke of Guise in 1528.

He was a highly effective general for the French crown. His children and grandchildren were to lead the Catholic party in the French Wars of Religion.

== Biography ==
Claude was born at the Château de Condé-sur-Moselle, the second son of René II, Duke of Lorraine, and Philippa of Guelders. He was educated at the French court of Francis I. On 9 June 1513, at the age of sixteen, Claude married Antoinette de Bourbon (1493–1583), daughter of François, Count of Vendôme.

== Military service ==
Claude distinguished himself at the Battle of Marignano (1515), and was long in recovering from the twenty-two wounds he received in the battle. In 1521, he fought at Fuenterrabia, and Louise of Savoy, king Francis' mother, ascribed the capture of the place to his efforts. In 1522, he forced the English to raise the siege of Hesdin. In 1523, he became governor of Champagne and Burgundy, after defeating at Neufchâteau the imperial troops who had invaded this province. In 1525, Claude defeated a peasant army near Saverne (Zabern). Following Francis I's return from captivity, Claude was made Duke of Guise in 1527.

== Marriage and issue ==
Claude married Antoinette de Bourbon, daughter of François, Count of Vendôme and Marie de Luxembourg, on 9 June 1513; they had:

- Mary of Guise (1515–1560); married firstly Louis II d'Orléans, Duke of Longueville and secondly king James V of Scotland and had issue, including Mary, Queen of Scots
- Francis, Duke of Guise (1519–1563)
- Louise of Guise (10 January 1520, Bar-le-Duc – 18 October 1542); married Charles I, Duke of Arschot on 20 February 1541.
- Renée of Guise (2 September 1522 – 3 April 1602), Abbess of St. Pierre, Reims
- Charles of Guise (1524–1574), Duke of Chevreuse, Archbishop of Reims, and Cardinal of Lorraine.
- Claude, Duke of Aumale (1526–1573)
- Louis I, Cardinal of Guise (1527–1578)
- Philip of Guise (3 September 1529, Joinville – 24 September 1529, Joinville) died in early childhood.
- Peter of Guise (b. 3 April 1530, Joinville); died at birth.
- Antoinette of Guise (31 August 1531, Joinville – 6 March 1561, Joinville), Abbess of Faremoutiers
- François de Lorraine, Grand Prior (18 April 1534, Joinville – 6 March 1563)
- René, Marquis of Elbeuf (1536–1566)

By an unnamed mistress, Claude had:

- son

== Death ==
Claude fell ill in 1550, and despite being under the care of five doctors, died on 12 April.

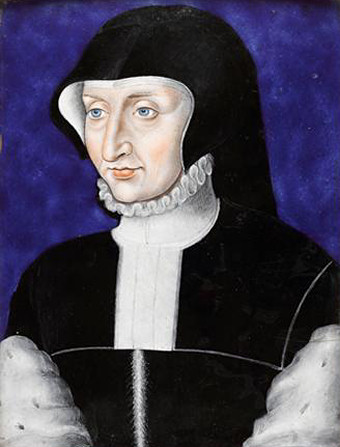
Antoinette de Bourbon

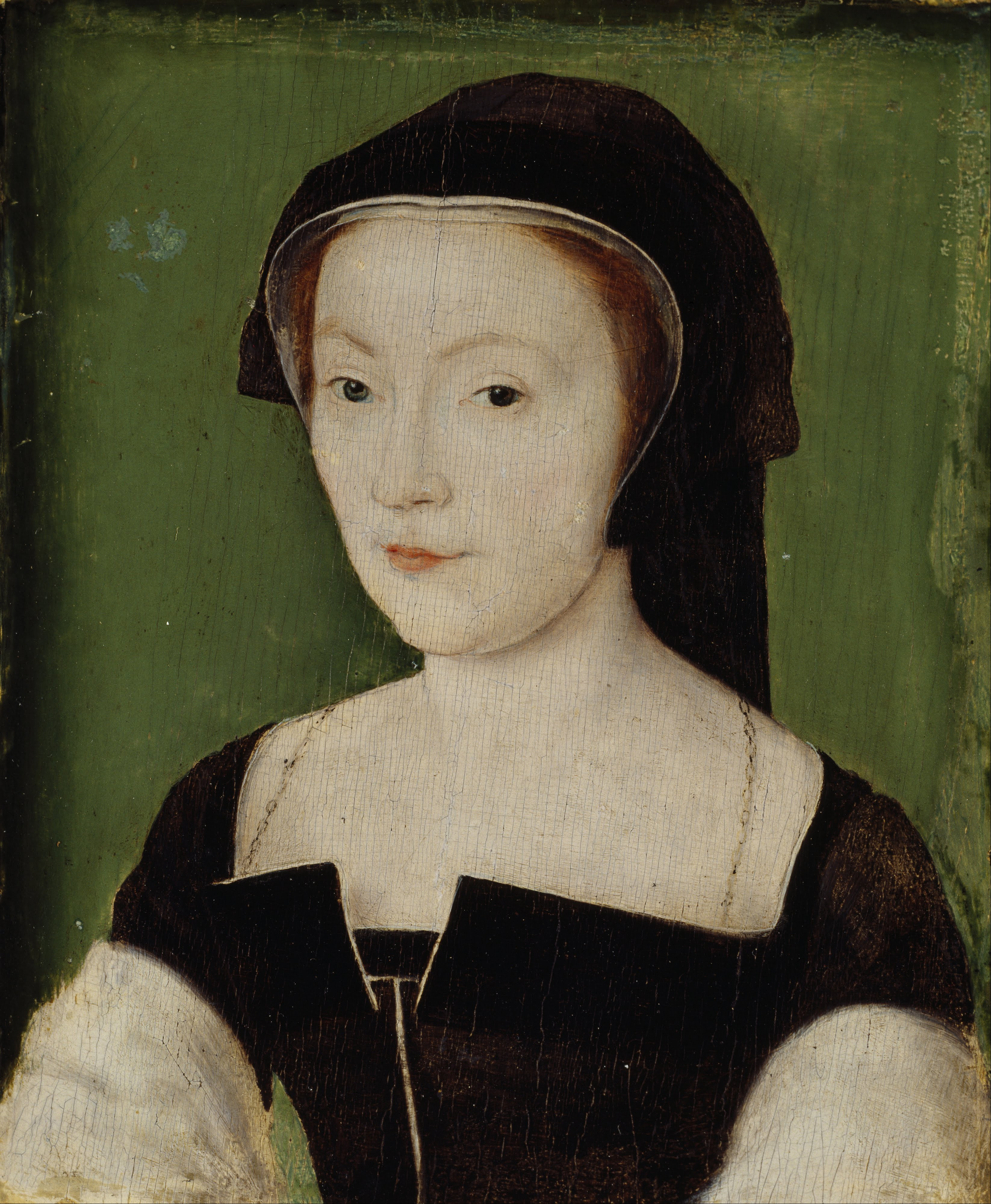
Queen-consort Mary of Scots

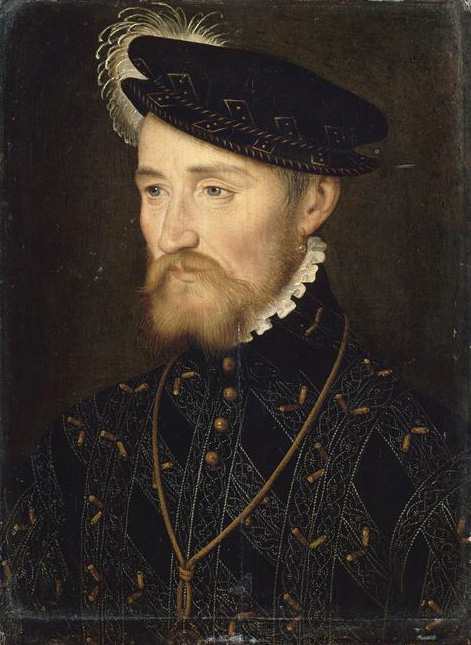
Duke Francis of Guise

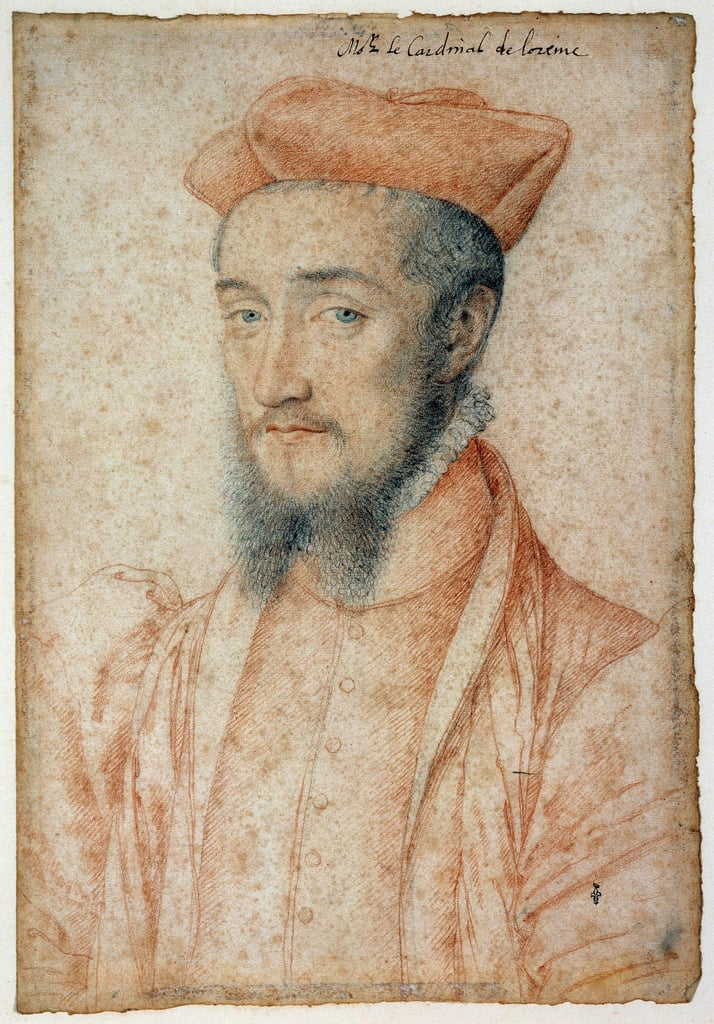
Cardinal Charles of Lorraine

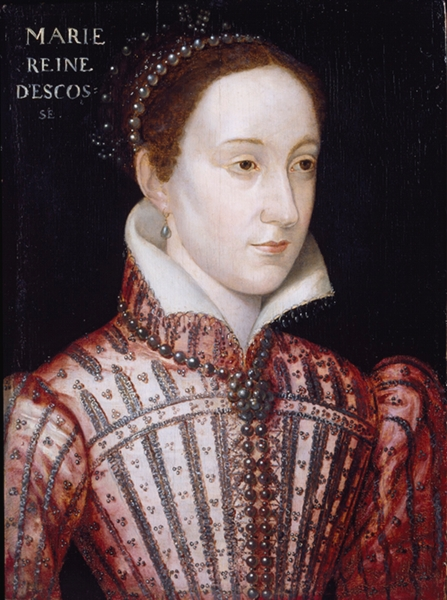
Queen Mary of Scots

== See also ==
- Duke of Lorraine
- Dukes of Lorraine family tree

== Notes ==
Claude, Duke of Guise House of Lorraine Born: 20 October 1496 Died: 12 April 1550
Preceded by René	Count of Guise; Lord of Elbeuf; 1508–1528	Elevation
Preceded by René	Count of Aumale; 1508–1547	Succeeded by Francis
New title Elevation	Duke of Guise; 1528–1550	Succeeded by Francis
New title Elevation	Marquis of Elbeuf; 1528–1550	Succeeded by René
