= Charles I, Duke of Elbeuf =

Charles I de Lorraine
- Marquis of Elbeuf then Duke of Elbeuf; Count of Harcourt
- Born: 18 October 1556; Joinville, France
- Died: 4 August 1605 (aged 48); Moulins, France
- Spouse: Marguerite de Chabot
- Issue Detail: Charles II, Duke of Elbeuf; Henri, Count of Harcourt; Claude Éléonore, Duchess of Roannais
- House: House of Lorraine
- Father: René II de Lorraine
- Mother: Louise de Rieux

Charles I de Lorraine, duc d'Elbeuf (Joinville, 18 October 1556 – Moulins, 4 August 1605) was a French noble, military commander and governor during the French Wars of Religion. The son of the most minor cadet house of the children of Claude, Duke of Guise, Elbeuf initially lacked the prominence of his cousins, however his succession to the Rieux inheritance made him important. Over the following decades he would gradually consolidate more of it under his authority, until by his death in 1605, all of the county of Harcourt belonged to the Elbeufs. A young man in 1573, he travelled with the king's brother to assume his kingship of the Commonwealth. Upon the prince's return as Henri III of France in 1574 Elbeuf would receive the honour of assuming the position of grand chamberlain during the coronation. After the establishment of the Ordre du Saint-Esprit in 1579, Elbeuf would be elevated as a knight of this chivalric body. The following year he supported the king's brother Alençon in his negotiations with the Dutch States General to assume the role of king. In the wake of these successful, if fraught, negotiations, he was nominated by Alençon as lieutenant-general of his army. Elbeuf and Alençon would travel to the Spanish Netherlands where they would relieve the besieged town of Cambrai, to much acclaim from the citizenry. Shortly after this, relations soured between Elbeuf and the prince, and Elbeuf retired back to his estates with the excuse of an illness, being refused when he offered to return the following year. In September 1581, his marquisate of Elbeuf was elevated to a peerage duchy, greatly elevating Elbeuf's social standing.

In 1584 Alençon died, and with the king childless, succession thus fell to the king's distant cousin Navarre. This was unacceptable to much of Catholic France, and the Guise family who were already disgruntled by their alienation from royal favour exploited it in the formation of a second ligue. Elbeuf for his part was frustrated by the granting of the governorship of Normandie, where all his estates were located to the royal favourite Joyeuse. With the larger family network all in agreement, rebellion was declared in early 1585, and Elbeuf received the submission of Bayeux to the ligue, while joining with the disgraced royal favourite François d'O who defected to the ligue with Caen. In May he left Normandie for Angers where he was bested in battle by Joyeuse shortly before the ligue and crown came to terms. In the peace he received the governorship of the Bourbonnais, rather than Normandie, as he had hoped. While the ligue and crown were now nominally allies, the accord was tenuous, and began to collapse in 1588 over the issue of Épernon, who the Guise despised. Elbeuf began raising forces in Normandie once again, but open confrontation was avoided, and the king capitulated to the ligue while staying in Rouen in July 1588. Henri was by now furious at the Guise erosion of his power and set his mind on the assassination of the duke. In December 1588 he had the duke and his brother executed, and Elbeuf, Nemours and others arrested.

Elbeuf spent the next 4 years in royal captivity before escaping in 1593. The ligue granted him the governorship of Poitiers however he demonstrated little interest in campaigning for their cause. He maintained cordial relations with the royal governor of Poitou, Malicorne and during a truce that year, enjoyed leisure pursuits with the ligues enemy Navarre. It thus followed that he was the first member of his family to defect to the royalist cause, doing so in 1594, in exchange for a large bribe, confirmation of his governorship of Poitiers and a sizable pension. In the following years he would receive further honours, including a return to the governorship of the Bourbonnais and the position of Grand Veneur. In his final years he continued to take an interest in Poitiers, helping suppress a tax rebellion in 1601, before dying in 1605.

== Early life and family ==
=== Childhood and inheritance ===
Charles de Lorraine was born in 1556, the son of René II de Lorraine, Marquis d'Elbeuf and Louise de Rieux. He received an education from the humanist Rémy Belleau at Joinville. At this time, he was a valuable child, the heir to part of the Rieux inheritance, and as such was kept under close wardship by Cardinal Lorraine, and Suzanne de Bourbon-Montpensier, his maternal grandmother. There were other heirs to the Rieux inheritance, and on the partage of 1584, Elbeuf found himself out of the inheritance of Harcourt, but in receipt of the smaller territories of Brionne and Lillebonne. Harcourt went to Paul de Coligny, however he died in 1586, and Elbeuf secured guardianship of his young son Guy, allowing him to control Harcourt until the boy's majority. When in 1605 Guy de Coligny died, the entire Rieux inheritance fell to the Elbeuf family.

As a result of this inheritance and other acquisitions, by the end of the century, Elbeuf could boast a yearly income of 50,000 livres.

=== Marriage ===
His sister, Marie d'Elbeuf, married his first cousin Charles, Duke of Aumale in 1576.

He married Marguerite de Chabot in 1583, the daughter of Léonor Chabot, lieutenant general of Bourgogne and Grand Écuyer, who promised to resign the latter office to his new son in law as part of the arrangement. She brought with her as a dowry the seigneurie de Pagny, and a lump sum payment of 12,000 livres. Marguerite soon moved to Normandie in 1584, and began working to bring the governor of Le Havre, a key port town, over to the ligueur cause.

The two would have many children:

- Charles II, Duke of Elbeuf who would marry an illegitimate daughter of Henri IV.
- Claude Éléonore of Lorraine (1598 † 1654) known as Mademoiselle d'Elbeuf prior to her marriage with Louis Gouffier († 1642), Duke of Roannais in 1650. The couple had no children.
- Henriette of Lorraine (1599 † 1669), Abbess of Soissons.
- Henri of Lorraine (1601 † 1666), Count of Harcourt, of Armagnac and of Brionne
- Françoise of Lorraine (1602 † 1626) never married;
- Catherine of Lorraine (1605 † 1611) died in infancy.

=== Religious outlook ===
Unlike much of his family, Elbeuf was of fairly relaxed religious disposition. He employed several Protestants in his household including members of the Fouilleuse and Sarcilly family and was friends with others. Through his mother Louise de Rieux he was connected to many of the leading Protestant aligned noble families, such as the Rieux, Laval and Coligny. This attitude was partly pragmatism, in Normandie, unlike Champagne, there were many important Protestant noble families, that a man of Elbeuf's standing needed to form relationships with.

== Reign of Charles IX ==
=== Assassination of Admiral Coligny ===
After it was agreed upon in the royal council to kill Admiral Coligny and other members of the Protestant leadership in Paris on 24 August 1572, the Guise were granted the task of killing the Admiral. The duke leapt at the chance to kill the man his family held responsible for the death of his father in 1563. Though he was only 16, Elbeuf accompanied his cousins through Paris to kill the Admiral, which they oversaw the conduct of in the early hours of the morning. A little while later a general massacre would develop in the city, before spiralling out of control across the country.

=== Commonwealth ===
In 1573, Anjou, was elected as king of the Polish-Lithuanian Commonwealth, and the fourth war of a religion was brought to a close to facilitate his travel. As he prepared to move to his new kingdom, he brought with him many young nobles of the court, of similar ages and experiences to himself. One of the nobles who travelled with him to form part of his household in the Commonwealth was Elbeuf. The day before his coronation on 20 February, Anjou gave a lunch for the Papal Nuncio and the various assembled ambassadors. At this meal Elbeuf and the other princes who had travelled with the king sat beside him to receive the dignitaries.

== Reign of Henri III ==
Upon the death of Charles IX, his brother, now styling himself Henri III was in the Commonwealth where he had recently assumed the crown. Having heard of his brothers death and the vacancy of the French throne he hurried to abandon the Commonwealth, fleeing in the night on horseback from the country. For his coronation as king of France on 13 February, the Guise family took pride of place after years in the political wilderness. Elbeuf assumed the position that was traditionally occupied by the grand chamberlain during the ceremony. After having returned to France and established himself as king, an embassy was required to be sent to the Commonwealth, so as to smooth over matters in the wake of his departure favourably towards France. To this end, Marshal Bellegarde and Elbeuf were to be dispatched to the country. However financial issues led to their expedition being continuously delayed.

In April 1578, a duel between favourites of the king and those of the duke of Guise occurred. In the combat that followed, two favourites of the king would be killed, Maugiron and Caylus. While two of Guise's favourites would also be killed in the duel, the final favourite Entragues, recognising the fury of the king at the loss of two of his close favourites decided to depart court. The extended Guise family, took the opportunity to show their displeasure at the duel by departing en masse on 10 May. Among the grandees departing, Elbeuf left court at this time.

=== Ordre du Saint-Esprit ===
Henri was conscious that in years previous, the crown's chief knightly order, that of Saint-Michel had been debased by its continuous award. To resolve this Henri decided to create a new chivalric order, naming his Saint-Esprit. This new, more prestigious order would be awarded to all of the main Lorraine princes, including Elbeuf. At this time, Elbeuf's landed interests and influence were almost entirely contained in Normandie.

=== Alençon ===
Alençon had long held the ambition to receive a crown of his own, and the Dutch rebellion offered him the possibility of realising this. In September 1580, negotiations took place between a delegation of the Dutch States-General and members of his council, among them the governor of Berry, La Châtre, brother of the duke of Montmorency, Méru and Elbeuf. The negotiations were fraught, as Alençons representatives disputed the powers their lord would receive, power of the States and other issues. On 17 September an agreement was finally reached, that papered over many of the competing visions for Alençon's kingship. Alençon thus set off the next year to assume his responsibilities.

Elbeuf would have an important role to play in Alençon's vision. The prince had promised to provide an army to assist the Dutch rebels, and Elbeuf was to be the forces lieutenant-general. This was despite his complete lack of military experience. The two men assembled forces, and rendezvoused at Evreux in May 1581. Elbeuf brought with him a retinue of 500 gentleman. The expenses of raising such forces in support of Alençon forced Elbeuf to divest himself of Quatremares in December 1583 for 80,000 livres to pay off his debts. After initially collaborating with Alençon in the relief of Cambrai, which secured the important city for the new king, the two men fell into disagreement and parted ways, Elbeuf leaving under the pretext of an illness. In March 1582, Elbeuf offered his services to the prince once more, but Alençon declined.

=== Marquis to duke ===
During the year 1581, Henri raised many seigneuries to peerage duchies. Anne de Joyeuse had his barony of Joyeuse elevated to a dukedom in August. The following month, Elbeufs' marquisate was made into a duchy. Elbeuf thus became both a duke and a peer of the realm.

Elbeuf, who had many landed interests in Normandie greatly desired the governorship of the province for himself. As such when the king decided to reconsolidate the governorship, from three separate charges (under Meilleraye, Carrouges and Matignon) to a single charge in 1583, Elbeuf had great hopes he would be invested with the office. It was instead given to one of the king's closest favourites Joyeuse, infuriating Elbeuf, who moved further into opposition to Henri. That same year, plans coalesced in the Guise family, for an invasion of England in favour of the Catholic cause. Elbeuf played a role in the organisation for this expedition, readying several ships at Harfleur in August. However the plans for the invasion would ultimately be confounded by domestic developments.

=== Ligue ===
Alençon proved to be sickly, and in 1584 he died. This created a problem for the king as the heir was now his distant cousin Navarre, a Protestant. The Guise family quickly declared themselves in opposition to Navarre's succession in favour of Cardinal Bourbon. In September a meeting was held at Nancy between the family and representatives of the more distant branches of the family, and their supporters. Elbeuf was among those gathered for this meeting. At the meeting it was agreed to conduct outreach towards Felip II and the Pope, the former proving far more receptive than the latter. The family exercised a network of control over much of north and eastern France, with the duke of Guise governor of Champagne, his brother Mayenne governor of Bourgogne, their cousin Aumale governor of Picardie, Mercœur governor of Bretagne and Elbeuf as governor of Anjou. During late 1584 each provincial leader began sounding out their clientele for support of the new ligue, which was declared in a manifesto at Reims in March 1585. Elbeuf for his part canvassed the families connections in Normandie. Many of the late Alençon's former clients in the province rallied to him. To generate funds for the force he was raising, he sold rentes in Rouen. In a secret treaty at Joinville on 31 December 1584, the Guise entered a formal agreement with Felip II, king of Spain promising various concession in return for financial subsidy. While Elbeuf and Aumale were not present at this meeting, they were represented by proxies.

In January 1585 he entered armed revolt in Normandie, in coordination with uprisings by his kinsmen governors. For the declaration of the ligue in Reims, Elbeuf conducted the aged Bourbon to the city for the declaration. This accomplished he proceeded to Bayeux, whose captain immediately defected to him. Bayeux became the centre of his operations in Normandie. François d'O, the disgraced former royal favourite, joined Elbeuf, bringing over his governorship of Caen to the ligue. The governor of Normandie, Joyeuse was for the moment absent, and the ligueur cause dominated the province.

In December 1584, the king, increasingly fearful of assassination established a new bodyguard for his own protection. 'The forty five' as it was known was composed of the clientele of Joyeuse and Épernon, the king's chief favourites. Though the organisation was designed to provide the king with more reliable protection than the grandees who traditionally composed his household, this was exploited by the ligueurs as further proof that the king trusted 'provincial ruffians' over nobles of worthy blood who should be protecting the king. In May 1585 one of the Gascons who made up the forty five, Montaud was arrested. Under interrogation he accused Elbeuf of having paid him 10,000 écus to assassinate the king. Though this accusation was false, Montaud would be executed on 14 May.

=== Treaty of Nemours ===
The king greatly resented the hold the ligueur aligned family held over much of France and initially sought to defy the ligue in favour of Navarre's succession. To this end he instructed his favourite Anne de Joyeuse, to counteract Aumale, and Elbeuf in their attempts to dominate Normandie. The main ligueur army under Guise would number 27,000 men, meanwhile Elbeuf and his chief lieutenant in Normandie Marshal Brissac led subsidiary armies. In May Elbeuf joined forces with Brissac at the latter's governorship of Angers. Having united their forces the two men were bested in an engagement with Joyeuse near Beaugency. Despite Joyeuse's success in Normandie, the king's resistance to the ligue would be short lived. In the Treaty of Nemours of July 1585 he yielded to most of their demands, excluding Navarre from the succession and banning Protestantism. Nevertheless, Elbeuf was denied his ambition for the peace, which had been to acquire the governorship of Dauphiné. Though not receiving this key governorship, he would receive the governorship of the Bourbonnais.

Now nominally allied to the ligue against Navarre, the king desired to break apart the networks that composed its aristocratic affinity. To this end in December 1585, he courted both Elbeuf and D'O, hoping to pull them into his circles, and away from the ligue, he was successful in the latter project.

One of the key bankers that the ligue dealt with in Paris was Sébastien Zemat. Though he provided great financial support to the ligue, their relationship was not without difficulties. At one point Elbeuf kidnapped him in the hopes of forcing his payment of a sum. The capture of an Italian banker delighted the Parisian population which forged a Sorbonne decree celebrating Elbeuf's actions and implying he possessed Papal infallibility.

=== Épernon ===
The nominal accord between the Guise and the king began to deteriorate in early 1588 over the matter of Épernon's authority. At a family meeting in January it was agreed that they would start seizing towns. Elbeuf returned to recruiting in Normandie as he had in 1584, and by March was ready to raise his standard at Harcourt, boasting a force of around 7000 men. He visited Rouen, allegedly on private business, so that he could gauge the support he had in the key town. Épernon responded to these probing manoeveurs swiftly, entering Rouen in May with a small army. In July the king himself arrived at Rouen, keen to be assured of its loyalty in the wake of losing Paris. Elbeuf was absent at this time from Normandie, having travelled to Paris to discuss matters with Guise. In his absence he left his wife in charge of the army. The king for his part, seeing the hopelessness of his situation was compelled to capitulate again to the ligue in a new Edict of Union on 21 July, while staying in Rouen.

=== Assassination of the duke of Guise ===
Unable to tolerate the hold the Guise family had over the crown in the wake of the Day of the Barricades, Henri resolved to kill the duke. He was encouraged towards this course of action by reports that the duke of Guise had alienated members of his familial network, including Elbeuf who were jealous of his power. The attack was accomplished in a surprise assassination in December 1588. In the preceding evening before the attempt, on 22 December, Elbeuf warned his cousin that the king desired his death, however Guise could not believe Henri would defy him in such a way. In the wake of the killing, Henri moved quickly to arrest any other members of the Guise household and their allies who might rebel in the wake of the killings. Among those arrested was Elbeuf, the prince of Joinville and the duke of Nemours. This was despite Henri's alleged assurances to his mother, who was ill in her chambers that his killing of the duke of Guise did not dissuade him from his affection for the dukes of Elbeuf, Nemours and Lorraine. Elbeuf was handed over to Épernon, who interred him in the famous Château de Loches. He would remain a captive for the next 4 years, finally escaping in 1593.

== Reign of Henri IV ==
=== Governor ===
With the north having fallen to the ligue, Elbeuf was appointed to the governorship of Poitiers. Despite his ligueur appointment, Elbeuf did not engage in any military actions against Navarre, and enjoyed friendly relations with Malicorne the royalist governor of Poitou. The two even worked out an arrangement for dividing the taille of the province.

=== Traitor ===
In 1593 Elbeuf's commitment to the ligue was already flagging. He had visited the king at Saint-Denis in the truce of that year where Henri greeted him with an embrace, nicknaming him the 'big fellow'. During the truce Elbeuf participated in a match of Jeu de Paume with the king on 28 May, much to the astonishment of the gathered crowds. The following year Elbeuf was the first member of the Guise clan to be bought back into loyalty to the crown, exchanging his ligueur position for 630,000 livres, a pension of 30,000 livres and confirmation of his ligueur granted office of governor of Poitiers. He was able to secure an Edict of Reduction, which returned Poitiers, to royal obedience in July 1594.The edict granted full amnesty to all ligueurs and instructed active forgetfullness of the crimes of the previous years. Elbeuf was in the city to receive the acclaim of many of the inhabitants to the edict. Elbeuf's position over the city was confirmed by the king the following year in July 1595, which reinforced his position as both governor and lieutenant general of the city.

After his return to obedience, Elbeuf would continue to be showered in honours. During the following decade proceeding his death he received the governorship of the Bourbonnais for the second time and one of the grand offices of state Grand Écuyer in 1597, which had formally been the title of his wife's father Léonor Chabot. His cousin Aumale's decision to choose exile over reconciliation with the king meant that his office of Grand Veneur was forfeit, and the king awarded this also to Elbeuf.

=== Poitiers ===
Though Poitiers was formally in obedience to the crown, urban disorders climaxed against royal authority again in 1601 after the issuance of the 'pancarte' tax on merchandise. The king considered sending in troops and revoking the towns privileges, to bring the city back into line. However ultimately he settled on sending in Elbeuf, to calm the urban notables, and restore them to loyalty. This method achieved success for the king. He further involved himself in disputes over the leadership of the city militia in July 1601, selecting his own candidate after the local military leaders failed to reach a decision. In 1605, he died.

== Sources ==
- Babelon, Jean-Pierre (2009). Henri IV. Fayard.
- Bernstein, Hilary (2004). Between Crown and Community: Politics and Civic Culture in Sixteenth-Century Poitiers. Cornell University Press.
- Carroll, Stuart (2005). Noble Power During the French Wars of Religion: The Guise Affinity and the Catholic Cause in Normandy. Cambridge University Press.
- Carroll, Stuart (2011). Martyrs and Murderers: The Guise Family and the Making of Europe. Oxford University Press.
- Chevallier, Pierre (1985). Henri III: Roi Shakespearien. Fayard.
- Heller, Henry (2003). Anti-Italianism in Sixteenth Century France. University of Toronto Press.
- Holt, Mack (2002). The Duke of Anjou and the Politique Struggle During the Wars of Religion. Cambridge University Press.
- Jouanna, Arlette (1998). Histoire et Dictionnaire des Guerres de Religion. Bouquins.
- Knecht, Robert (2010). The French Wars of Religion, 1559-1598. Routledge.
- Knecht, Robert (2014). Catherine de' Medici. Routledge.
- Knecht, Robert (2016). Hero or Tyrant? Henry III, King of France, 1574-1589. Routledge.
- Konnert, Mark (1997). Civic Agendas & Religious Passion: Châlon-sur-Marne during the French Wars of Religion 1560-1594. Sixteenth Century Journal Publishers Inc.
- Konnert, Mark (2006). Local Politics in the French Wars of Religion: The Towns of Champagne, the Duc de Guise and the Catholic League 1560-1595. Ashgate.
- Pitts, Vincent (2012). Henri IV of France: His Reign and Age. Johns Hopkins University Press.
- Potter, David, ed. (2004). Foreign Intelligence and Information in Elizabethan England: Two English Treatises on the State of France, 1580-1584. Cambridge University Press.
- Le Roux, Nicolas (2000). La Faveur du Roi: Mignons et Courtisans au Temps des Derniers Valois. Champ Vallon.
- Salmon, J.H.M (1975). Society in Crisis: France during the Sixteenth Century. Metheun & Co.
- Spangler, Jonathan (2009). The Society of Princes: The Lorraine-Guise and the Conservation of Power and. Routledge.
- Thompson, James (1909). The Wars of Religion in France 1559-1576: The Huguenots, Catherine de Medici and Philip II. Chicago University Press.

Preceded by René II	Marquis, then Duke of Elbeuf; 1566-1605	Succeeded by Charles II
Preceded by René II	Count of Harcourt; 1566-1605	Succeeded by Henri
