= Louis II de Lorraine, cardinal de Guise =

French prelate, Cardinal and politician

His Eminence Louis II de Lorraine
- Cardinal, Archbishop of Reims
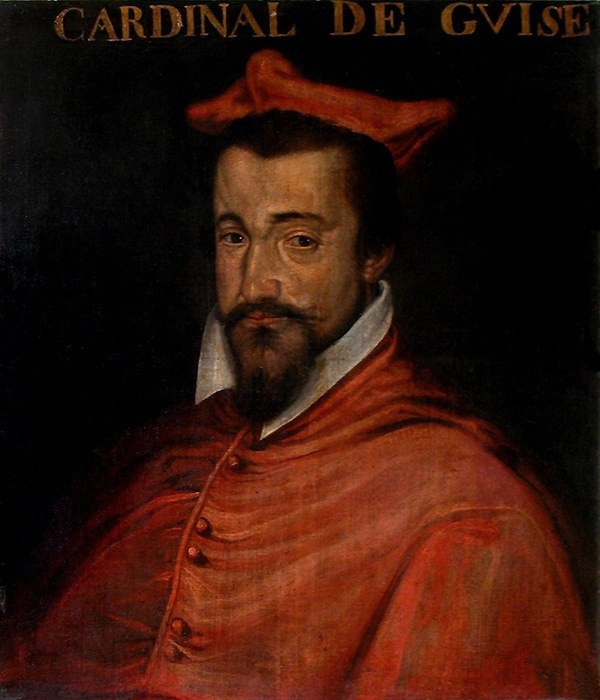
- Church: Roman Catholic Church
- Archdiocese: Reims
- Appointed: 26 December 1574
- Term ended: 24 December 1588
- Predecessor: Charles de Lorraine
- Successor: Nicolas de Pellevé

Orders
- Ordination: 2 January 1579 by Nicolas Fumée
- Consecration: 13 March 1580 by Charles II de Bourbon
- Created cardinal: 21 February 1578 by Pope Gregory XIII

Personal details
- Born: 6 July 1555 Dampierre, France
- Died: 24 December 1588 (aged 33) Château de Bois
- Parents: François de Lorraine, duke of Guise (father); Anna d'Este (mother)
- Coat of arms

Louis II de Lorraine, cardinal de Guise (6 July 1555, Dampierre – 24 December 1588, Château de Blois) was a French prelate, Cardinal and politician during the latter French Wars of Religion. The third son of François de Lorraine, duke of Guise and Anne d'Este, Louis was destined for a career in the church. His uncle Cardinal Lorraine resigned his offices of Archbishop of Reims to him in 1574, and the death of his other uncle Louis I de Lorraine, Cardinal de Guise passed his ecclesiastical empire on to him upon his death in 1578. At which time, the king made him Cardinal. Cardinal Guise actively involved himself in the first Catholic Ligue that rose up in opposition to the generous Peace of Monsieur which brought the fifth war of religion to a close in 1576. The ligue succeeded in resuming the civil war the next year and a harsher peace was concluded. Over the following years of peace, he would feud with Épernon, and receive Henri III's new honour when he was made a chevalier de l'Ordre du Saint-Esprit in 1578 among the first cohort. Finally reaching the ecclesiastical age at which he could assume his responsibilities as Archbishop of Reims in 1583, he entered the city in triumph and oversaw a council at which he pushed for the promulgation of the Tridentine Decrees.

In 1584, Henri's brother Alençon died, and as the king had no children, the inheritance of the throne was due to default to Henri's distant cousin Navarre, a Protestant. This was intolerable to the Guise family, and Cardinal Guise, and they sought to revive the ligue of 1576, agreeing to establish a new ligue at a council in Nancy in September of that year. On 21 March 1585, the Guise and their allies issued the Péronne Manifesto which denounced the failure of the king to suppress Protestantism, the problems of succession and the king's choice of favourites. Several days earlier the duke of Guise had occupied Châlons-sur-Marne, formerly declaring war on the crown. Cardinal Guise and his brother marched on Reims and succeeded in gaining entry, assuming authority over the religious capital of the kingdom for the ligue. The war with the king would be brought to a conclusion by the Treaty of Nemours in July 1585, by which Henri agreed to a series of humiliating concessions, and promised to pursue a war against heresy. His pursuit of the war was half-hearted, and in 1586 Cardinal Guise met with his brothers at the Abbey of Ourscamp where they affirmed that even if the king made peace with the Protestant Navarre they would defy him and continue the fight regardless. Guise and Cardinal Bourbon the ligueur candidate to succeed Henri, published a remonstrance in which they denounced the court as a sinful place and advocated reform on the lines of the Council of Trent.

In May 1588, Henri pushed for a confrontation with the duke of Guise during the Day of the Barricades. His plan backfired and he was forced to flee the capital, while a coup government calling itself the Seize assumed control of the city. In the wake of this humiliation, Henri was forced into further concessions, among them promising to get the Pope to make Cardinal Guise the Legate of Avignon. The Cardinal now had grander ambitions, and he headed to Troyes where after gaining entry, he effected a ligueur coup and purged the administration of royalists while urging his brother to march on the king in Chartres and force him into a monastery. With Troyes in hand, Cardinal Guise integrated the city into the ligueur Sainte-Union, alongside Chaumont, Reims and Paris, but was frustrated by the reticence of Châlons-sur-Marne. In September, Henri called an Estates General and after having assured himself of an appropriately ligueur delegation from Troyes, he left for the meeting at Blois. At the estates, he clashed with Henri, brow-beating the king into deleting parts of his opening address that were critical of nobles who were participating in the ligue. Cardinal Guise was by now increasingly incautious in his contempt for the king, and on 17 December toasted his brother as the king, and joined his sister Catherine in joking about tonsuring Henri. On 23 December, the duke of Guise was assassinated and the Cardinal was arrested. After being interrogated, he was butchered in his cell on 24 December. France exploded in outrage over the murder of the duke and his brother. Meanwhile, the legal-minded ligueurs recognised the king's folly in having the Cardinal executed, and began campaigning for Sixtus V to excommunicate the king. While Henri sought to justify himself to the Pope as acting in self-defence, the Pope found his excuses insufficient, and was preparing to excommunicate him for the crime, when the king was assassinated on 1 August.

== Early life and family ==
=== Youth ===
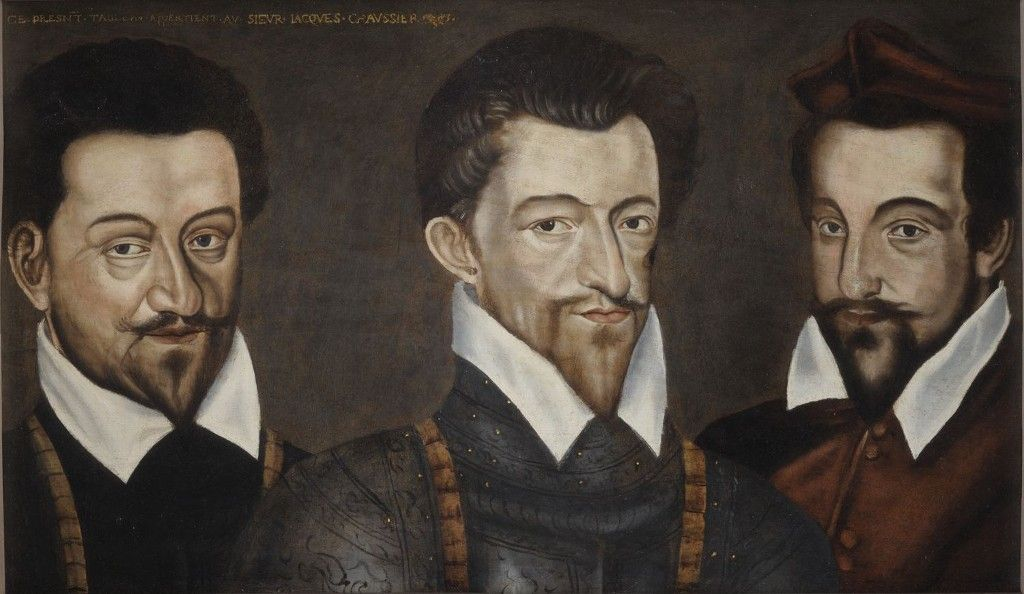
Portrait of the three sons of François de Lorraine, Cardinal Guise is on the right

Louis II de Lorraine was the third son of François de Lorraine, duke of Guise and Anne d'Este. He was born in 1555, his elder brothers Henri de Lorraine and Charles de Lorraine having been born in 1549 and 1554 respectively, while his elder sister Catherine de Lorraine was born in 1552. Unlike his elder brothers, Louis was destined for a church career.

In his youth, Gilles d'Abos served as his governor, a role for which he would be rewarded during the Cardinal's career with a place in his household. His education was conservative, led by a Benedictine scholar, contrasting greatly with the humanist education of his uncle Lorraine.

=== Ecclesiastical inheritance ===
Upon the death of his uncles, the first Cardinal of Guise, and Cardinal Lorraine Guise succeeded to many of their benefices providing him with a great number of lucrative revenues. Among the abbeys he inherited was the Abbey of Fécamp one of the two great abbeys of Normandie, which was resigned to him by Lorraine in 1574. Cardinal Lorraine had worked hard even in his final year, to ensure that Henri would agree to the transfer of his benefices upon his death, including the critical Archbishopric of Reims. The archbishopric of Reims brought with it the position of premier pair de France. His cousin Claude de Lorraine, chevalier d'Aumale held the other great Norman abbey of Bec. In 1578 upon the death of the first Cardinal of Guise, Guise was elevated to the Cardinalate. His elevation came in great part due to the efforts of Henri.

Guise was not content merely to inherit the ecclesiastical fortune granted to him however, and from 1574 to 1588 he would acquire a further six benefices, aided by the Pope's favour towards him. He would abide by the traditional rules of canonical age requirements, only assuming the authority he inherited as Archbishop of Reims in 1583, making a triumphal entry into the ancient city that year. Now invested with the authority of Archbishop, he held a provincial synod in May that looked towards Trent as a model for church reform, and put himself at the centre of a penitential procession movement that was blooming, with thousands of pilgrims descending on Reims. Despite these efforts he would be derided in Rome at the time as someone who compromised the authority of the Holy See.

=== Relationships ===
Despite the prohibitions of the ecclesiastical profession, Guise was not celibate, and with his mistress Aymerie de Lescherenne he would have four illegitimate children. He would further enter into dispute with Épernon favourite to Henri III over their mutual desire for one of the daughters of Mme d'Estrées. This reputation as a womanizer led to Pope Sixtus V describing him as a Galero, not a Cardinal.

== Reign of Henri III ==
=== First ligue ===
With the formation of the first national Catholic ligue in 1576, formed in opposition to the Peace of Monsieur which afforded generous provisions to Protestants generally and their aristocratic leaders in particular, Cardinal Guise saw advantage for his family in affiliation. The only member of his family currently in the episcopate he brought his spiritual backing to their cause.

The ligue successfully pressured Henri into resuming the civil wars in 1577. Lacking money from the Estates General, he was unable to support an army, and as such a peace party quickly developed at court. During a debate in March 1577 about the clergy's demand at the Estates for only one religion to be tolerated in France, Cardinal Guise lined himself up in support of the measure, alongside his brother the duke, their brother Mayenne and Nevers. Catherine de Medici meanwhile led the opposition on the council, arguing that there could never be peace in France if this measure was enforced. The civil war would continue for several more months before the disintegration of the royal army due to lack of finances led to the conclusion of the Treaty of Bergerac in September.

=== Years of peace ===
With the departure of Alençon, Henri's brother, from court in February 1578, the favourites of Henri turned their violent attentions to the favourites of those young men in the entourage of the duke of Guise. In April they would fight a famous duel in which two favourites of the king and two of Guise's were killed. Henri was furious at what had transpired, and the Guise family, equally frustrated with the court, and fearful of royal retribution, decided to stage a grand departure en masse. On 10 May, Cardinal Guise and his two brothers alongside their cousins the duke of Aumale and the duke of Elbeuf, all departed court.

Henri desired for his favourite, Épernon to succeed the present governor of the key port city of Boulogne, Antoine d'Estrées to his office. This brought him into conflict with Cardinal Guise, who attempted through his relationship with the d'Estrées family to obstruct this appointment. Henri complained to the Cardinal about his efforts, and ultimately Épernon would receive the governorship.

In 1578, Henri decided to create a new chivalric order, to supersede the previous Ordre de Saint-Michel which had in the 1560s been debased through its widespread awarding. The Ordre du Saint-Esprit received its first chevaliers on 31 December 1578. Cardinal Guise, alongside Cardinal Bourbon was created chevalier de l'Ordre du Saint-Esprit in the first intake.

In July 1581, the family received a major boon when a marriage was arranged between Anne de Joyeuse, chief favourite of Henri, and Marguerite of Lorraine-Vaudémont, a cousin of the Guise. The cardinal and his brothers were present on Marguerite's behalf to witness the signing of the marriage contract. The wedding took place on 24 September 1581. The Cardinal hosted one of the many marriage feasts that accompanied the event, hosting the new couple on 9 October at the hôtel de Guise.

=== Second ligue ===
While the first ligue had collapsed after the Treaty of Bergerac, the death of Alençon and the resulting situation in which Navarre, a distant cousin of Henri and a Protestant was now heir to the throne, revitalised the movement in 1584. The duke of Guise and his two brothers, met with family allies at Nancy in September, at which they agreed to form an association to exclude Navarre from the succession. To this end, they sought the support of Felipe II, who was keen to aid radical Catholics abroad. The two sides would sign a secret treaty at Joinville on 31 December of that year, by which Felipe offered financial support in return for various concessions.

The duke of Guise and Cardinal Guise met with allied ecclesiastics in 1585, to strategize the ligueur plan of action for the province of Champagne. In February of that year, a shipment of arms (7000 arquebuses and 250 Corslets) being smuggled up the Marne by Guise's écuyer Rochette was intercepted at Lagny. Henri reacted with fury to the discovery, a fury equalled by the duke of Guise, who claimed the arms were for his protection at Joinville. On 21 March the ligueurs published the Manifesto of Péronne, outlining the reason they had recently taken arms, as with Guise's seizure of Châlons-sur-Marne on 16 March. Péronne was chosen by the Guise as the location, so as to symbolically link their ligue to that of 1576, which had originated there. The manifesto expounded on the problems facing the kingdom from Protestants at arms, to the lack of a dauphin, to the monopolisation of access to the king by a small handful of favourites. Henri had also according to the manifesto betrayed his promises at the Estates General of 1576 to reunite his subjects in the Catholic faith. This manifesto was likely written by a member of Cardinal Guise's entourage, Claude Mathieu.

With Châlons secured, the duke of Guise united with his brother the Cardinal and together they marched on Reims, hoping the city would welcome them. They were unpleasantly surprised at their reception, having been beaten in a race to the city by the baron de Lux who carried orders from Henri not to admit them. An assembly of 200 notables assembled to consider whether to permit their entry, and concluded that they would follow the direct instructions of the king. Cardinal Guise sprung into action, and over the next 24 hours worked to persuade the council of his brother's good intentions, and successfully convinced the council to countermand the order. The commander of the porte de Vesle however continued to refuse their entry, noting that he had not received any countermanding orders to those he had been provided with yesterday, so the party headed to another gate via which they gained entry, proceeding to Cardinal Guise's residence of the Abbey of Saint-Rémy. While the duke of Guise initially made a poor impression upon the grandees of the city, Cardinal Guise worked to distribute privileges to a number of leading notables, bribing many others, thus securing their hold on Reims.

=== Treaty of Nemours ===
In the months of civil war that followed, Catherine de Medici, mother to the king, would conduct negotiations with both Cardinal Guise and Cardinal Bourbon at Épernay, however, these were unable to achieve an acceptable compromise. During the negotiations, Cardinal Guise demanded the city of Reims as his personal surety. Further negotiations not involving Guise conducted by Catherine would bring the short war to an end with the Peace of Nemours in July. The peace was an almost total capitulation to the ligue and the Manifesto of Péronne. Protestantism was banned, all preachers expelled and a number of surety towns granted to the Guise family and their clients. On the happy occasion of their political victory, Cardinal Guise met with his two brothers, the Prince of Joinville son of the duke and Esclavolles for a series of festivities. Among the celebrations was a ritual burning of an effigy of heresy.

Now committed to war against his heir Navarre, Henri pursued the conflict half-heartedly, continually sending out feelers for negotiation with his cousin. The duke of Guise met with his Cardinal brother and Cardinal Bourbon at the Abbey of Ourscamp a few kilometres from Noyon in September 1586, together they affirmed their alliance and agreed they would reject any peace negotiated by Henri and continue the fight against heresy alone if necessary. Cardinal Guise and Bourbon agreed to remonstrate against the king and called for a reformation of the French church. The two men denounced Henri's court as a place which produced wickedness. Despite these declarations, when Henri attempted to raise funds to prosecute the war through the alienation of church land, Cardinal Guise vehemently opposed any suggestion of the project. Remaking to the Cardinal while asking for funds 'Is this not a holy war?' he received in reply that taking funds from the church would risk the continuity of the Mass.

In September 1587 the Cardinal of Guise entered Langres which had recently paid host to both Dinteville and Guise in one of their showdowns. He sought to bring the city to the ligue through less militant means, offering a bribe to the mayor, Roussat in the form of a large pension. Roussat however refused, an act which was celebrated by the city in its official memory.

=== Day of the Barricades ===
The Day of the Barricades in Paris radically altered the balance of power between Henri and the ligue in the kingdom. On 5 June the king was forced to concede to the ligue, agreeing to establish an Edict of Union by which he would affirm the exclusion of Navarre from the succession, and forgive all those who had participated in the disorder in Paris. Soon thereafter the duke of Guise was made lieutenant-general of the army, Bourbon was granted the privilege of appointing the master of town guilds, and for Cardinal Guise, Henri promised to acquire the legateship of Avignon for him from the Pope. Cardinal Guise was not satisfied however, and urged his brother to seize his advantage, and march on the king in his Chartres exile and seize him, so that he might be deposed and confined to a monastery.

=== Troyes ===
Cardinal Guise sought to take advantage of the new ligueur ascendency by securing the family possession of the towns of Champagne. He wrote to Rouen, Troyes and Sens urging them to provide support to the ligue and remain unified in their loyalty to the movement. On 16 May representatives of the ligue arrived at Troyes hoping to secure a declaration of loyalty from the city. They presented their case in front of council, but had by this point been outmanoeuvred by Henri who had sent word to the town that Guisards were not to be received, and resultingly the président de Mesgrigny declared the town's loyalty to the crown.

Cardinal Guise himself arrived outside Troyes on 4 June, at the gate of Saint-Jacques. He was denied entry to the city, and moved over to the gate of Croncels where in a meeting with several of the city's notables he was again rebuffed. Fuming at his treatment, Guise retreated from the walls. On 9 June he attempted a new strategy, conscious that he might not have the advantage for long if the lieutenant-general Dinteville arrived he requested an interview with several officials of the town so that he might make the will of Henri and the duke of Guise known to them. By now his plans for a coup were underway and the following day he gained entry with the aid of ligueur sympathisers inside who were in control of Croncels and allowed him to enter alongside Esclavolles and an armed escort.

He travelled to the episcopal residence accompanied by a 200-strong bodyguard and mayor d'Aubeterre. He quickly set about consolidating his authority over Troyes, first through the installation of Nicolas de Hault as mayor, a man with long connections to the Guise family, and then a week later, a general purge of the administration, to remove all the councillors who were hostile to the ligue. In total 2/3 of the council was purged by the coup. Guise represented himself as a leader of a more populist regime, however, few of those appointed to replace the purged councillors were 'new men'. Several of the new councillors were however those who had helped him in assuming control over the city, among them the commander of the gate that had afforded him entry.

Among those purged from the council was d'Aubeterre, who had accompanied Guise on his forceful entry into the city. D'Aubeterre had been nominated by the king, and had relations with de Mesgrigny, making him an object of suspicion. De Mesgrigny was expelled from the city by Guise and many other residents left at this time for exile. The new regime expected the people of Troyes to toast to the health of the Guise, and not speak of Henri. Cardinal Guise arranged for the restoration of the water supply to Troyes, which he had previously cut off, and set about instilling fervour through regular religious processions. Bonfires were held where enemies of the ligue were burned.

He reached out in letters to Châlons-sur-Marne, hoping to bring them into the fold of the Sainte-Union. After several councillors were sent to meet with Guise, they stalled for time, claiming they could not come to a decision before convoking the three estates in Châlons to consider their grievances. Guise and his brother the duke were increasingly frustrated by Châlons' various stalling tactics, the city only making a tentative agreement with the ligue after the king had already conceded signing the Edict of Union on 21 July while staying in Rouen. Other cities were far more willing, and representatives from Chaumont, the Seize in Paris and Reims met in Troyes to affirm their allegiance to the ligueur Sainte-Union. Guise was delighted with Chaumont, and dispatched the prince de Joinville to the city to congratulate them.

While Cardinal Guise had achieved success in Troyes for the family, his cousin Charles, Duke of Aumale was having a more difficult time in Picardie. Unlike Guise he had failed to secure the city he desired, Boulogne.

=== Estates General of 1588 ===
With news of the calling of an Estates General, Guise prepared to depart Troyes, ensuring before he left that he would be accompanied by suitably ligueur delegates to represent the city in the Estates: Yves Le Tartrier, Philippe de Verd and Jacques Angenoust. For his own participation, he had secured election through the assembly of Rouen.

In the Estates that gathered at Blois in September, Guise secured for himself the position of Président of the first estate, alongside Charles I, Cardinal de Bourbon. In total the ligue held a majority among the first estate, with seventeen of the twenty-six prelates being affiliated at some time with the movement. Despite this, the royalist prelates were far more active in the proceedings that followed. Upon laying sight on the Cardinal Henri allegedly remarked 'Look! The reçeveur général de Champagne, a joke about the financial extraction from Troyes Guise had undertaken.

Henri opened the Estates with a polished speech. In it he mentioned 'some grandees' who in the past had formed ligues in his kingdom, and that while he would forgive and forget the past, any of his subjects who entered such organisations going forward were guilty of treason. At this the duke of Guise became pale, and after proceedings were finished for the day was pulled aside by Cardinal Guise, who chided the duke for not having followed his advice after the Day of the Barricades and having been content to do things by half. Having held council with the duke and the Cardinal de Bourbon, the Archbishop of Lyon and Cardinal Guise went to find the king. The two men explained that the presence of this portion of his speech had greatly distressed the estates, and that if it was not removed from the published version the estates would depart from Blois. Henri yielded to the threat and removed the offending phrases. This new humiliation added to Henri's grievances with the Guise.

Despite their theoretical ligueur alliance with the Third Estate deputies, the duke of Guise and his brother were increasingly frustrated by the intransigence of the Third Estate as the Estates General continued. At a meeting with La Chapelle-Marteau, the ligueur mayor of Paris and président of the Third Estate, Cardinal Guise tried to convince him that his deputies inflexibility in their fiscal demands, would destroy the French state. Henri for his part saw the hand of the Guise behind the Third Estates radical demands.

=== Assassination ===
The situation between the Guise and Henri was thus increasingly strained. At a dinner party on 17 December, Cardinal Guise raised a toast to his brother, describing him as the king, meanwhile Catherine de Lorraine, the duke's sister joked that she would soon have need of her scissors (to tonsure Henri), to which Cardinal Guise added that he would hold the king's head still. The events of the evening were reported to the king by the Venetianelli. Unable to tolerate the continued erosion of his authority, as represented by this and the slights of the Estates, Henri resolved to kill the duke of Guise and his brother.

Cardinal Guise arrived to attend the king's council on 23 December, alongside his brother the duke of Guise and the Archbishop of Lyon. The archbishop and Cardinal arrived first, worrying Henri that some traitor had warned the duke of his plan, causing him to stay away. Shortly after their arrival the duke was called off to meet the king in a side room, and on his way to Henri was murdered by several members of the king's bodyguard the Quarante Cinq. The sound of his murder was not quiet and Guise and Lyon could hear the struggle and rose to rush to their brother and compatriot. The Cardinal, in terror, cried out to the captain of the Scots guard for his life. Cardinal Guise had to be restrained by four councillors from moving to the door. At this, Marshal Aumont put his hand on his sword and warned Guise and Lyon to stay seated. The two men were arrested shortly thereafter. For the rest of the day Guise was interrogated by Marshal Retz as to the 'true designs' of the ligue. Under pressure, he confessed that the ligue had planned for the duke of Nevers to seize the king. Left in a cell for the night with Lyon, the two men feared they were to be put to death, and gave each other the necessary absolution to face their demises. Alongside offering each other absolution Guise and Lyon comforted each other through the night, and refused to eat any food offered to them out of fear that it might be poisoned.

Henri made the decision to have Cardinal Guise executed on 24 December 1588, after initially considering sparing him due to his high ecclesiastical status. Upon remembering how the Cardinal had spoken of him during the dinner of the 17th he decided he would only spare the Archbishop of Lyon. The sacrilegious prospect of murdering a Cardinal did not appeal to even the members of his personal bodyguard and only one of the Quarante Cinq could be convinced to carry out the deed. Captain Michel de Gast and several soldiers who were each compensated several hundred livres for their participation entered his cell and butchered him with halberds. Shortly after his murder his body and that of his brother were burned, so that their bones could not become a tool of martyrdom.

=== Consequences of murder ===
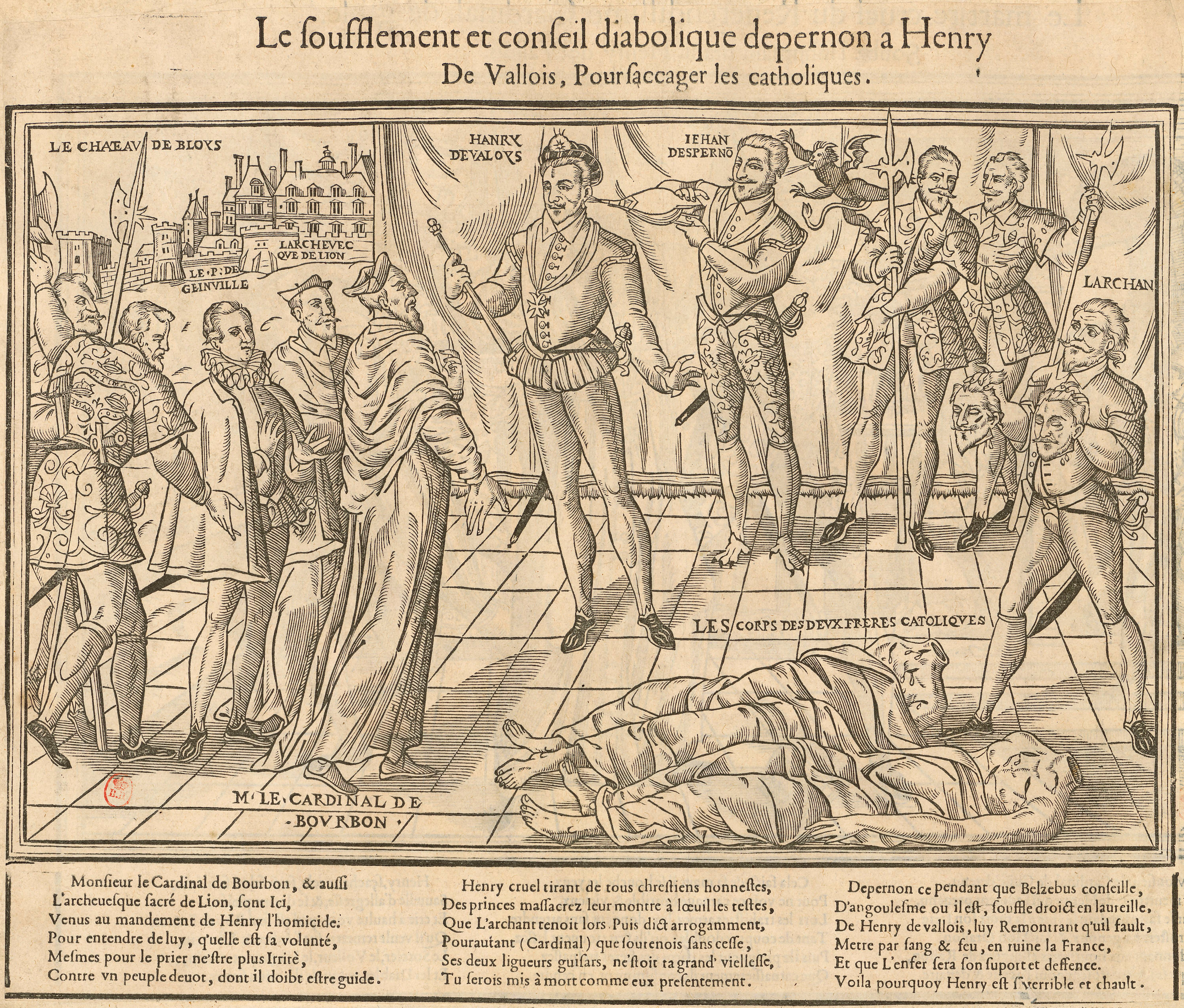
Polemical image denouncing Henri and Épernon for their roles in killing the duke and his brother.

In the wake of the dual assassination Paris and France at large exploded in fury. The streets rang with cries of 'Murder!' 'Fire!' 'Vengeance!' The Seize which ruled Paris, vowed that they would expend every last drop of blood to avenge the two princes. In early 1589, Rouen would fall to a ligueur coup, and servants of the deceased Cardinal would be among those who composed the new ligueur council in the key city. While the population of Paris was largely upset about the murder of their Catholic hero, the duke of Guise, for the legally tactical ligueurs, the murder of Cardinal Guise was far more strategically advantageous to their cause. It was possible to declare that by killing a Cardinal, Henri had incurred an automatic excommunication, not even requiring the word of the Pope to establish. As such they were legally obligated to rebel against him to restore 'Christian rule'. The doctors of the Sorbonne certainly took this view and in anticipation of the imminent excommunication of the king for the murder of the Cardinal, they declared Henri deposed, and elaborated that it was the duty of all Frenchman to resist him forcefully.

Pope Sixtus V was sympathetic to these efforts, and commented that Henri's murder of Cardinal Guise was a sacrilegious act that carried with it the possibility of excommunication. As early as 24 December Henri had requested a meeting with the Papal Legate Morosini to explain his actions, he asserted he would have preferred to deal with the Guise brothers via the normal legal process, but their threats to his authority were too immediate. Morosini was disgusted, and informed the king he had violated the Papal bull In Cena Domini through his murder of the Cardinal, and that he would need to seek absolution from the Pope. Henri retorted that he was exempt from excommunication by virtue of being king of France. While Morosini had the authority to excommunicate him in that meeting, through his office, he decided not to, leaving it to the Pope to decide. On 25 December, Henri confessed to the theologal of Blois for his murder of Cardinal Guise and was absolved by him.

In early January Henri dispatched Cardinal Joyeuse to Rome to justify the assassination of the Cardinal to the Pope. Joyeuse tried to offer the king's justification to Sixtus, but was interrupted by the angry Pope who remarked that Cardinal Guise should have been sent to Rome for trial and that 'never before had a king killed a Cardinal'. Sixtus concluded by saying that he expected Henri to submit an appeal for absolution to him in writing. On 9 January Sixtus held a consistory in which he discussed the death of the Cardinal. He expounded upon the 'infinite pain' he had been in upon receiving the news, and how Emperor Theodosius I had been excommunicated for far less. He warned that if Henri was allowed to get away with the murder, other Cardinals would be vulnerable also. Claude d'Angennes the bishop of Le Mans was dispatched the following month to continue entreating with the Pope, he was received several times into Sixtus' presence, but failed to achieve absolution for the king.

As Henri lay dying after he was stabbed on 1 August, he sought absolution from his confessor. The confessor refused, as he had yet to satisfy the demands made of him by Sixtus; releasing Cardinal Bourbon, and doing penance for the murder of Cardinal Guise. Henri, desperate to die a good Catholic promised that he would meet all the Pope's demands.

== See also ==
- House of Guise

== Sources ==
- Babelon, Jean-Pierre (2009). Henri IV. Fayard.
- Baumgartner, Frederic (1986). Change and Continuity in the French Episcopate: The Bishops and the Wars of Religion 1547-1610.
- Carroll, Stuart (2005). Noble Power During the French Wars of Religion: The Guise Affinity and the Catholic Cause in Normandy. Cambridge University Press.
- Carroll, Stuart (2011). Martyrs and Murderers: The Guise Family and the Making of Europe. Oxford University Press.
- Chevallier, Pierre (1985). Henri III: Roi Shakespearien. Fayard.
- Cloulas, Ivan (1979). Catherine de Médicis. Fayard.
- Constant, Jean-Marie (1996). La Ligue. Fayard.
- Durot, Éric (2012). François de Lorraine, duc de Guise entre Dieu et le Roi. Classiques Garnier.
- Eire, Carlos M. N. (2016). Reformations: The Early Modern World, 1450-1650. Yale University Press.
- Holt, Mack P. (2005). The French Wars of Religion, 1562-1629. Cambridge University Press.
- Jouanna, Arlette (1998). Histoire et Dictionnaire des Guerres de Religion. Bouquins.
- Knecht, Robert (2010). The French Wars of Religion, 1559-1598. Routledge.
- Knecht, Robert (2014). Catherine de' Medici. Routledge.
- Knecht, Robert (2016). Hero or Tyrant? Henry III, King of France, 1574-1589. Routledge.
- Konnert, Mark (1997). Civic Agendas & Religious Passion: Châlon-sur-Marne during the French Wars of Religion 1560-1594. Sixteenth Century Journal Publishers Inc.
- Konnert, Mark (2006). Local Politics in the French Wars of Religion: The Towns of Champagne, the Duc de Guise and the Catholic League 1560-1595. Ashgate.
- Pitts, Vincent (2012). Henri IV of France: His Reign and Age. Johns Hopkins University Press.
- Roberts, Penny (1996). A City in Conflict: Troyes during the French Wars of Religion. Manchester University Press.
- Le Roux, Nicolas (2000). La Faveur du Roi: Mignons et Courtisans au Temps des Derniers Valois. Champ Vallon.
- Le Roux, Nicolas (2006). Un Régicide au nom de Dieu: L'Assassinat d'Henri III. Gallimard.
- Salmon, J.H.M (1979). Society in Crisis: France during the Sixteenth Century. Metheun & Co.
- Sutherland, Nicola (1980). The Huguenot Struggle for Recognition. Yale University Press.
