= Claude, Duke of Aumale =

French aristocrat (1526–1573)

Claude II de Lorraine
- Duc d'Aumale Duc de Mayenne Comte de Maulévrier
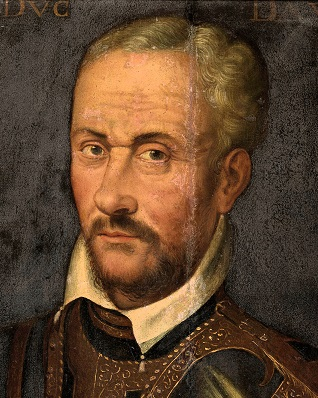
- Seventeenth Century Portrait of the duke
- Born: 18 August 1526; Joinville
- Died: 3 March 1573 (aged 46); La Rochelle
- Noble family: House of Guise
- Spouse: Louise de Brézé
- Issue: Henri de Lorraine Count of Valentinois; Catherine Romula; Charles, Duke of Aumale; Diane de Lorraine; Antoinette Louise de Lorraine; Claude de Lorraine; Marie de Lorraine
- Father: Claude de Lorraine
- Mother: Antoinette de Bourbon

Claude II de Lorraine, duc d'Aumale (18 August 1526, Joinville – 3 March 1573, La Rochelle) was a Prince étranger, military commander and French governor, during the latter Italian Wars and the early French Wars of Religion. The son of the first Duke of Guise he started his career in a pre-eminent position in French politics as a son of one of the leading families in the court of Henri II of France. Upon the death of his father in 1550, Aumale inherited the governorship of Burgundy from his father, and the duchy of Aumale from his brother who assumed the titles of Guise. Aumale was made colonel-general of the light horse by the new king and fought in Italy, Alsace and Picardie between 1551 and 1559. While leading the light cavalry during the defence of Metz he was captured, and held for the next two years, until his mother in law Diane de Poitiers paid his ransom. He achieved success at the siege of Volpiano and played an important role in the capture of Calais for which he was rewarded with the governorship of French Piedmont.

With the death of Henri II he found himself further pushed into prominence in the Guise regime for the young François II. He took part in the effort to suppress the Conspiracy of Amboise that threatened to topple the regime in early 1560. He played a key role in the organisation of the expedition to Scotland in 1560, however the instability that racked the country in the wake of the conspiracy in combination with financial issues ensured the cancellation of the expedition, in December of that year the king died and the Guise regime was displaced by a regency under Catherine de Medici. Alienated by the new regime he departed court in early 1561, before returning as part of his brother Charles, Cardinal of Lorraine's attempted policy of religious reconciliation at the Colloquy of Poissy, the failure of this and the increasing Protestant nature of Catherine's inner circle led to him leading the family into a second exile from court. In early 1562 he was with his brothers at their meeting with the Duke of Württemberg where the topic of uniting around the Lutheran creed was broached. Any hope of this policy was shattered on the return to the capital, where Guise's men committed a Massacre of Protestant worshippers at Wassy.

This served as the instigating incident for the French Wars of Religion. Aumale served the crown throughout the first war, repeatedly trying to besiege Rouen without success, before the main royal army arrived with sufficient force to subdue the town. He failed to stop François de Coligny d'Andelot bringing mercenaries into the kingdom to reinforce the rebel cause. He was wounded at the Battle of Dreux in December. In January his brother was assassinated, leaving him and Lorraine as heads of the family. Guise's son inherited his governorship of Champagne. Aumale would act as de facto governor until the young Guise attained his majority. He played a far more active role in the governance of Champagne than his own government of Burgundy. Meanwhile he and his family prosecuted a bitter vendetta against Gaspard II de Coligny who they blamed for the assassination of Guise. This culminated in skirmishes in Paris, before the king was able to enforce a peace in 1566 between the parties. Aumale continued to fight in the second and third civil wars, but was repeatedly unable to stop incursions into France by German reiters in favour of the rebels. While he was not involved in the planning of the liquidation of the Protestant leadership he was intimately involved in the killing of the Protestant leaders on 24 August 1572 that would spiral out of control into the Massacre of Saint Bartholomew. The following year he was among the nobles present at the siege of La Rochelle where he was killed on 3 March 1573.

== Early life and family ==
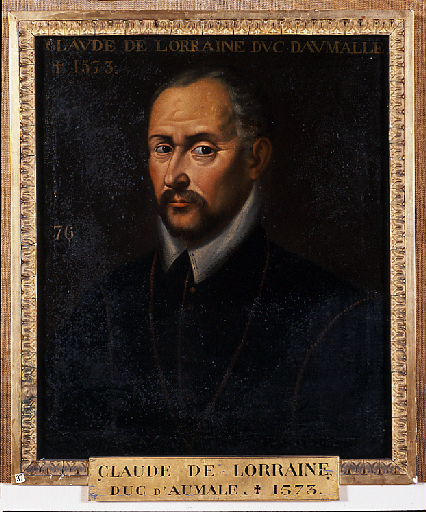
Claude, Duke of Aumale

Coat of arms of the Dukes of Aumale

=== Family ===
Claude II de Lorraine, duc d'Aumale, was born in 1526, the third son of Claude, Duke of Guise and Antoinette de Bourbon. The eldest son François, Duke of Guise was 7 years his elder, while Charles, Cardinal of Lorraine was born in 1524. Louis I, Cardinal of Guise was born in 1527, while François de Lorraine was born in 1534. The youngest Guise son René, Marquis of Elbeuf was born in 1536. Meanwhile his sisters Mary of Guise, Louise of Guise, Reneé of Guise and Antoinette of Guise were born in 1515, 1520, 1522 and 1531 respectively.

=== Louise de Brézé ===
On 1 August 1547 he married Louise de Brézé (c. 1518 – January 1577), dame d'Anet, the daughter of Louis de Brézé, seigneur d'Anet, and Diane de Poitiers in one of the key political marriages of the decade. Diane gifted her new son in law Rhuys and Sucinio in Bretagne. She further favoured him with her Norman possessions. The Duke of Guise inquired of Gaspard II de Coligny as to his opinions on the marriage, Coligny replied that he felt Aumale had debased himself by marrying for profit as opposed to the honour of his family. Guise retorted that Coligny was jealous.

The de Bréze inheritance took a considerable time to settle. Aumale and Louise traded Mauny for Anet with the other heirs, the La Marcks. The La Marcks' poor financial situation allowed them to purchase the County of Maulévrier and Barony of Bee Crespin in 1562. Henri-Robert de la Marck was compelled into this by the debts he had acquired as the result of his father's ransom. Aumale continued to acquire land in Normandie until by the late 1560s he was one of the great landholders of upper Normandie.

=== Children ===
They had:

- Henri (21 October 1549, Château de Saint-Germain – 1 August 1559), Count of Valentinois died in childhood.
- Catherine Romula (8 November 1550, Saint-Germain – 25 June 1606), married on 11 May 1569 Nicholas, Duke of Mercœur
- Madeleine Diane (b. 5 February 1554), died at birth.
- Charles, Duke of Aumale (1555–1631)
- Diane (10 November 1558 – 25 June 1586, Ligny), married on 13 November 1576 François, Duke of Piney-Luxemburg
- Antoinette (b. 9 June 1560, Nancy), died at birth
- Antoinette Louise (29 September 1561, Joinville – 24 August 1643, Soissons), Abbess of Soissons
- Antoine (b. 12 November 1562), died at birth
- Claude (13 December 1564 – 3 January 1591, Saint-Denis), called the "Chevalier d'Aumale", Abbot of St.-Pere-en-Valle, Chartres, Knight of the Order of Malta, General of the Galleys
- Marie (10 June 1565 – 27 January 1627), Abbess of Chelles
- Charles (25 January 1566 – 7 May 1568, Paris) died in early childhood.

== Reign of Henri II ==
At the beginning of Henri II's reign, the king was faced with revolts against the Gabelle tax in the Garrone. To this end he dispatched his favourite Anne de Montmorency alongside François, Duke of Guise and Aumale. Together they achieved success in suppressing the tax revolt. That same year the king elevated the marquisate of Aumale to a duchy for its current holder, Guise. Aumale for his part held the marquisate of Mayenne. In May 1547 Aumale was made a Chevalier de l'ordre de Saint-Michel and in either 1548 or 1549 he became colonel general of the light cavalry.

As part of the Treaty of Boulogne which ended the war of the Rough Wooing, Aumale and François de Vendôme, Vidame de Chartres, were among six French hostages sent to England.

=== Inheritance ===
Upon the death of Claude, Duke of Guise in 1550, the duke's Norman territories were split between the two Guise children with the most landed interests in Normandie, Aumale and René, Marquis of Elbeuf. Aumale's brother François, Duke of Guise provided the title of Aumale to him in April, given he was set to inherit that of Guise. Alongside his Norman inheritance, the king permitted the new duke to inherit his father's governorship of Burgundy. He was also made Grand Veneur during the reign of Henri II. Aumale was contemptful of the prospect of administering his governorship personally, mockingly saying in 1556 that having to administer his province would take only one hour a week, it was therefore a matter best left to a lieutenant-general. He would later brag that he had many governors across France who would follow his whim i.e. Guisard clients. Aumale was allowed to come to Scotland, with a passport from Edward VI dated 11 May, to see his sister Mary of Guise. He wrote from Edinburgh on 18 May that he would view the strong places of the realm. Regent Arran gave him three horses and organised a banquet for him in Edinburgh on 21 May. He returned to France through England, visiting Edward VI at Greenwich on 12 June before taking a ship at Dover.

=== Resumption of the Italian Wars ===
==== Piedmont Campaign ====
Seeing potential advantage, Henri II resumed the Italian Wars in 1551. To this end Brissac assembled an army in the Piedmont for an invasion of Italy. Among the forces under him were the flower of the French nobility, including Aumale. The army successfully reduced the town of Chieri. This conflict was not however technically war with the Emperor. Both Henri and Charles V were fighting a proxy war in these engagements, and it would not be until the following year that full scale conflict would develop between the powers.

==== Capture of the Three Bishoprics ====
Having received an invitation to take the Three Bishoprics, Henri invaded Alsace in 1552. With Metz occupied, Charles V, Holy Roman Emperor now offered his response, beginning a large scale siege of the city, which was under the military leadership of Aumale's brother Guise. With the duke of Alba moving to set up his forces against the city, Aumale, who was present in his capacity as colonel-general was dispatched with the light cavalry to harass and stymy his efforts, to delay the full investment of Metz. Near the town of Nancy Aumale's troops were caught up in a skirmish, and after a bloody fight in which he was taken off his horse, he was forced to surrender. His brother was proud when he heard of the fight that he had put up prior to his capture. Guise would successfully hold the city and Charles V was forced to raise the siege. Diane ensured that Aumale's heavy ransom would be provided, paying the Margrave of Brandenburg 60,000 livres in 1554 to secure her son in laws release from captivity. Aumale was released from captivity on 28 April 1554.

==== Second Italian Campaign ====
Later that year Aumale was back in command, leading a force of 4000 infantry and 2000 horse at Laon as part of Henri's revenge campaign for the destruction of Thérouanne the previous year. The campaign would achieve surprising success, with a small force under Guise besting the Imperial army at Renty. The following year Aumale was back in Italy under the command of Brissac. Having recently received reinforcements from Henri, Brissac made an attack on the town of Volpiano however sickness overcame him and he ceded command of the siege to Aumale. As in years previous, many ambitious young nobles flocked to the siege lines to participate in the victory, including Condé, Nemours and Enghien. Aumale's first attack lacked enough artillery support and failed, this failure alerted Alba to the attack, and he sent companies to reinforce the town. Aumale dispatched Enghein, Blaise de Monluc and other captains to intercept them, which they achieve. By 19 September Brissac returns from his convalescence expecting to receive the towns surrender, but fighting continues until 23 September when the town surrenders.

=== Disaster in the north ===
In the late 1550s, the campaign against Charles moved north into Picardie. Guise meanwhile campaigned in Italy, but without much success, Alba grinding him down in a war of attrition. In May 1557 Lorraine wrote to the king, urging him to relieve command of the Italian forces from Guise, giving the responsibility to Aumale, the king for the moment did nothing however. Meanwhile the Imperial army delivered a crushing blow to a French force under Anne de Montmorency, constable of France and the king's favourite at the battle of Saint-Quentin. Much of the high French nobility including Montmorency were captured in the debacle. This left the Guise with an opportunity to assert their dominance at court, and shortly thereafter Guise travelled from Italy to meet the king, and was made lieutenant-general of France, the highest military office in the absence of the Constable. His brothers Aumale, Elbeuf and François de Lorraine, Grand Prior joined him as he planned his next moves, Aumale having commanded the Italian army on its withdrawal back to France as Guise raced off ahead. With the armies withdrawal from Italy, the Pope was forced to make peace with the Imperial forces in September.

Aumale for his part would request the Marshal baton vacated by the death of the Duke of Bouillon in Spanish captivity. Bouillon had been made prisoner in the Battle of Hesdin in 1553 and had died shortly after his release in 1556. Henri considered the prospect, but decided against it, holding onto the baton for the next two years before awarding it to Paul de Thermes. Guise settled on conquering siege of Calais as a way to restore French honour and gain a strategic advantage, a city which had been in English hands since 1347. Aumale and Elbeuf joined him for the siege and, after capturing a weak fortress that guarded the approach to Calais, entrusted Aumale and Elbeuf with its defence while he retired to camp. The brothers held the castle against two ferocious counter attacks by the desperate English, who recognised the strategic importance of the site. By 8 January the commander of Calais sued for terms, and yielded the critical city. In reward for the victory, Henri provided gifts to those captains he held most responsible. Aumale was provided the governorship of French controlled Piedmont replacing Brissac in the role. This necessitated a replacement for Aumale as commander of the light horse, an honour which was given to Jacques, Duke of Nemours. He was further provided with a temporary lieutenancy giving him military command in Picardie, an office he would make use of from May to July of that year, working in concert with Jacques d'Humières. At the end of this tenure the disastrous battle of Gravelines again threw the French forces into disarray.

== Reign of François II ==
As part of the 'Palace Revolution' that accompanied the death of Henri II, Diane de Poitiers was forced into exile from court to satisfy Catherine de Medici who had never liked her husband's mistress. Aumale, the son in law of Diane protested but the needs to satisfy the queen mother overruled his own.

=== Conspiracy of Amboise ===
In opposition to the Guise government that was formed in the wake of the death of Henri II, a conspiracy formed, combining religious and political malcontents with the new order. This conspiracy attempted to kidnap the young François II while he was staying at the Castle of Amboise. Forewarned of the conspiracy, the Guise invited much of the upper nobility to the court, including Aumale and set about preparing a defence. When the conspiracy activated in March 1560, various bands were repelled from the castle. Marshal Saint-André, favourite of the deceased king, was tasked with heading to Tours with 200 horse, so that he might suppress any disorder related to the rebellion in that city. Aumale, Nemours and the Prince of Condé were instructed to support his efforts in Tours and travelled there in the following days. The rebellion was successfully crushed, and the leaders were summarily executed at Amboise. Nevertheless the conspiracy was an impetus for a new royal policy as regards Protestantism, where previously the concepts of heresy and sedition had been treated as a unified crime, they were for the first time separated as concepts in the Edict of Amboise, in which those convicted of heresy without taking up arms were pardoned on condition they live as good Catholics henceforth. Aumale was present at the formulation of this edict which inaugurated a new era for royal policy as concerned combatting heresy.

=== Scottish ambitions ===
The Guise government had great ambitions for Scotland and desired to send an expedition to the kingdom in 1560. Aumale, as a brother of the governments leaders and major land holder in Normandy was to be key in these plans. Elbeuf and Aumale worked in tandem with Bouillon and Jean d'Estouteville, seigneur de Villebon in organising the nobles that were gathering in the province, ready for transportation. The campaign would however founder due to problems of lack of money and the problems of internal instability that wracked France in the wake of Amboise.

== Reign of Charles IX ==
=== Fall from power ===
In December the young king François, who had always been sickly, died. With his death the Guise connection to the government through his wife was severed and their dominance at court was greatly threatened. With Catherine de Medici and Antoine of Navarre taking the lead for the young Charles IX of France, the Guise recognised there was little place for them in the new government. In an exodus in January 1561 Guise, Lorraine, Aumale, Cardinal Guise, Elbeuf and the Grand Prior departed from court.

=== Change in religious policy ===
The Colloquy of Poissy which attempted to resolve the religious question through a reconciliation of the faiths descended into acrimony. With the failure of this royal policy, Catherine as regent began to move the crown in the direction of formal toleration of two faiths simultaneously in the kingdom. Such a policy was intolerable and in combination with the increasing presence of open Protestants on the conseil privé which left little space for the Guise, the family decided once more to depart court. Aumale was the first to leave on 8 October, shortly to be followed by the rest of his family and sympathetic nobles, including the Protestant Longueville and Nemours. Catherine and Navarre pleaded for the family to return to court, conscious that they lacked a wide enough support base for a stable regime.

In early 1562 the city council of Dijon wrote a lengthy complaint to Aumale, urging him to punish Protestants in Burgundy who were 'in violation' of the Edict of January, the council had no plans to grant the Protestants the rights offered to them under the same edict, but saw it as a useful tool nevertheless. The lieutenant general of Burgundy, Tavannes who had Aumale's authority in his absence from the province was not willing to wait for Aumale to respond, and in May ordered all Protestant preachers to assemble in the square of Dijon so they could be expelled from the town. Back in February, the duke of Guise, Lorraine and Aumale travelled for a meeting with the duke of Württemberg at Saverne. The matter of discussion was Christian doctrine, Württemberg being a Lutheran, a version of Protestantism not practiced in much of France but more of interest to Lorraine in terms of bringing about a reconciliation of the two faiths than Calvinism. Lorraine was interested in subscribing to the Confession of Augsburg and the meeting ultimately concluded on cordial terms. However the friendly words with the Protestant prince would be shattered by the betrayal of the Massacre of Wassy as Guise made his way back to the capital on 1 March in which the duke's men massacred a congregation of Protestant worshippers.

=== First war of religion ===
==== Failure outside Rouen ====
In May 1562 after the fall of Dieppe to a Protestant coup, Aumale was dispatched with a special commission to restore order in Normandie. Bouillon was furious that his government was being undermined by this extraordinary commission, and he besieged Aumale's deputy Matignon in his residence. Having achieved successes elsewhere in Normandy Aumale moved on Rouen. Aumale appeared before the walls of Rouen on 28 May 1562, in the previous month the city had joined the Protestant rebels under the overall authority of the Prince of Condé. Keen to avoid a costly siege he demanded the city open its gates to him. The rebels inside, confident of their defences refused his entreaties. Aumale was therefore forced to begin a siege. He lacked the forces to fully invest the city, however the 3000 soldiers under his command were able to spend the next month harassing the surrounding area as a means of putting pressure on the inhabitants, meanwhile the city continued to fill with reinforcing Protestant forces. Withdrawing from the siege in June, Aumale brought his forces to the main royal army under Guise which was facing off in a stalemate with Condé near Orléans. Aumale's forces were gathered at Beaugency, between those of his allies Navarre and Guise. Condé stalled, unwilling to meet the growing royal army in an open battle, as he waited it continued to grow until such time as he felt it necessary to disperse his army and retreat inside Orléans. This gave the royal army the freedom of action to reduce the other towns that had fallen to the Protestants in the early months of the war. As a result the army was divided into four, with Aumale to deal with Rouen, Saint-André to seize Lyon, Montpensier to head south to Guienne and the main body under Navarre to confront Condé. A little while after Condé's deteriorating forces retreated into the city Aumale seized Honfleur on 21 July. This accomplished Aumale returned again to the walls of Rouen on 29 July with 6500 men, and set up batteries, however his forces were again able to do little against the walls with their small number.

==== Blocking effort ====
Having been unable to achieve success at Rouen, Aumale was tasked by the chiefs of the royal army with responsibility for blocking Andelot in his attempt to bring back the mercenary force of German reiters he had recruited in Germany to bolster the beleaguered Protestant army, that was shut up in the city of Orléans under loose siege. Aumale's attempts would be a failure however as Andelot was able to outmanoeveur him and join his forces with those inside Orléans. This failure meant that the loose siege of the city was now untenable and Saint-André had to withdraw his forces from around Orléans. Aumale returned to his bête noire, the siege of Rouen. Continually short on funds he expropriated cloth that belonged to the merchants of Rouen that was sitting at Brienne. He also utilised methods that were more controversial among his fellow nobles, instructing Catholic peasants to harass Protestant forces. Hoping to aid his brother, Guise instructed for recently recruited German mercenaries to be directed from the Loire where they weren't required to reinforce Aumale outside the city. During September and October the main royal army would come to Orléans, and successfully prosecute the siege where Aumale couldn't. At the Battle of Dreux in December, the only major field engagement of the first war of religion, Aumale fought with the crown. According to his brothers' report of the days event he was thrown from his horse in the fighting, and had broken his shoulder from the impact. Aumale's forces had tried to fight the Swiss Protestant reiters early in the day, in hopes of saving the left wing of the royal army, but his troops were routed by the oncoming Swiss.

==== Assassination of the duke of Guise ====
In January 1563, while conducting the siege of Orléans Guise was assassinated by Jean de Poltrot. In the absence of Lorraine, Aumale and Cardinal Guise hurried to the siege, keen to ensure their brothers exit was stage managed in an appropriately orthodox fashion after all the rumours that had surrounded Navarre's exit at Rouen. They selected for him the conservative confessor the Bishop Riez, those who were present accused Riez of manipulating the dukes final words and downplaying his sorrow for his crime at Wassy. Riez provided the epistle of Saint James for the duke to listen to, one denounced by Martin Luther as an 'epistle of straw' and ensured Guise defended the Real presence. Their brothers death successfully managed the whole family met for a council in March, where they established the plan of their vendetta against Gaspard II de Coligny who they blamed for orchestrating the dukes death. Guise's death meant that the Catholic cause at court had lost its most charismatic defender. Aumale lacked his brothers charisma but had a far more consistent Catholic militarism. Aumale and Lorraine acted as the leaders of the ultra Catholic faction at court, holding the role until the young Henry I, Duke of Guise reached his majority. Alongside Aumale's role representing his nephew's interests at court, it was also his duty to act as governor of Champagne during the young princes minority until he reached adulthood.

=== Champagne ===
In the capacity of de facto governor Champagne, when controversy arose between the governor of Châlons-sur-Marne, Louis de Clermont, seigneur de Bussy and his town council over his desire to have a royal garrison to protect the town while German mercenaries returned over the border. Aumale was deferred to, he responded fiercely, harshly criticising the council for their intransigence on the issue. The council apologised to the duke, but maintained their opposition to a royal garrison. Aumale visited the city himself in May to enforce a garrison of four companies of soldiers on the community. When the election results in Troyes did not go the way the local administration wanted, they appealed to Aumale, who got them voided, the election was held again with the same result causing a new appeal, Aumale secured a guarantee that the present administration could continue regardless. In some localities near Troyes, Aumale oversaw the prohibition of Protestantism.

=== Feud ===
At first pursuing their feud with Coligny through legal channels, Aumale argued bitterly with the Constable during council and took advantage of the courts presence in Champagne to argue with the Prince de Porcien a Protestant prince and ally of the Montmorency. With legal channels a failure, the king shutting down any attempts to re-open an investigation into the murder, the Guise turned to extra-legal methods. In 1565 they attempted a show of force in the capital, traditionally the backyard of the Montmorency. When Lorraine entered under arms, the governor François de Montmorency demanded he explain himself for violating his prohibition on armed entries into the capital. Forces of the governor and Lorraine got into skirmishes, and Lorraine came out the worse, beating a hasty retreat first to his residence. where he was besieged by heckling Parisians, and then from the city. A short while later Aumale entered Paris via a different gate, meeting far less resistance than Lorraine, he largely remained in the suburbs. Montmorency wrote to Montpensier opining his fears that these moves were a prelude to a Guisard attempt to seize the capital, however there is little evidence of any plan to do this.

Aumale and his brother Elbeuf tried to establish a ligue of anti-Montmorency nobles in the provinces. They elicited oaths from nobles swearing to 'avenge the killers of the duke to the fourth generation' however none of this support provided material aid to their cause. These ligues should not be confused with the later Catholic ligue, the target was not Protestantism but rather the house of Montmorency. In January 1566 while the court was staying at Moulins Lorraine warned that Aumale would seek to take Coligny's life, irrespective of a decision by the council. However later in his time at Moulins the eldest Guise brother Lorraine was forced by the king to exchange the kiss of peace with Coligny, Aumale for his part refused to acknowledge the Admiral.

=== Second war of religion ===
With civil war resumed in 1567 after the failure of the Protestant Surprise of Meaux, Aumale was again tasked with defending the frontier against attempts to reinforce Condé's army, which was investing Paris, with German reiters. That December the main royal army broke out of Paris under the command of the Constable Montmorency. In the battle of Saint Denis his forces bested those of Condé, however he himself was killed on the field. The office of Constable was now vacant and with it overall command of the royal army. The Guise family pushed for Aumale to be named as the new Constable, while the Montmorency pushed for Marshal Montmorency to receive the post. Neither would be successful, the crown little desiring to see such an important office held outside the royal family again, instead Anjou was made lieutenant-general of the kingdom, giving him equivalent authority over the army. While these disputes were ongoing, none of the crowns forces were able to stop the juncture of Condé and the reiters in December, the Prince having fled eastwards with his forces after the bruising but small engagement. By early 1568, the drive of the war had diminished, and the king's council moved towards peace. Lorraine for his part was keen to send Aumale to Scotland, to liberate Mary, Queen of Scots and secure the Catholic religion in the country. This expedition would not however come to pass, and war would resume later that same year as the peace was overturned.

=== Third war of religion ===
In the following civil war, after the abortive Peace of Longjumeau Aumale was for a third time entrusted with protecting the border against attempted mercenary incursions. He was encamped in Champagne with eighteen companies of men-at-arms, while Cossé defended the border up in Picardie with a further fifteen. To assist him in his efforts in Champagne, he oversaw the assembling of a second army largely composed of mercenary contingents under the duke of Nemours. The Duke of Zweibrücken crossed the frontier in January 1569. Nemours and Aumale attempted with great urgency to stop him joining forces with the main Protestant body under Coligny, however they failed in their task and Zweibrücken outmaneuvered them, capturing La Charité on 20 May allowing him to link with the rebels. The two commanders forces, once outflanked had followed him in on his march into the interior, failing to confront him. Their inability to coordinate with each other and interpersonal difficulties aroused the fury of the secretary of state Villeroy who lambasted how noble feuding compromised the greater interests of the state. Catherine reproached Aumale for his conduct in the campaign, accusing him of incompetence and cowardice. After the crushing royal victory at the Battle of Moncontour in which the main Protestant army under Coligny was annihilated, Aumale and Marshal Biron were tasked with chasing down several of the routed columns. The columns were however skilfully handled, and they were unable to catch them. Moreover by this point the royal armies under their authority, absent of pay and racked with disease were beginning to disintegrate.

=== Assassination of the Admiral ===
Frustrated by the continuity of the feud between Coligny and the Guise despite the supposed termination of the disagreement with the settlement of Moulins. Charles planned in 1571 further efforts to reconcile the two families. In October he summoned Aumale and the two sons of the murdered duke Guise and Charles, Duke of Mayenne to court. Hoping to effect a reconciliation between them and the Admiral, it would not however come to pass and tensions continued to escalate between the families. After exchanging threats of military action, things cooled in 1572. In May 1572 Aumale, Guise and Mayenne formally recognised Coligny's innocence for the assassination of the previous duke of Guise. This represented an arm of Catherine's reconciliation policy, and enabled Coligny to return to court in June.

After the attempt on Coligny's life on 22 August 1572, the situation in Paris deteriorated fast, as the Protestant nobles threatened to take justice into their own hands against those they held responsible, namely the Guise family. Aumale and Guise, son of the deceased duke, well aware that their complicity was suspected came to the king and asked him whether they could have permission to depart from court. He replied coldly that he would bring them to justice if the need arose and that they could depart. While the two considered this course of action for a while, they ultimately decided this would be an admission of guilt for the attempt and chose to stay. Catherine de Medici held a council in which it was decided to pre-emptively assassinate the leading Protestants in the city. While the Guise were not involved in these discussions, they were invited to a meeting at 23:00 on 23 August in which the specific list of targets was drawn up. Aumale and Guise were involved in this process alongside Anjou brother to the king and the king's cousin Louis, Duke of Montpensier, Aumale and Guise were to lead the attack against their hated enemy Coligny and those lodged with him. To this end they were provided with forces of Anjou's personal guard. In the early hours of 24 August Guise rode out with 60 men including Aumale and Angoulême towards the residence of Coligny. The men waited outside while their subordinates went up and dealt with Coligny. In the following hours militant elements of the population of Paris would jump on the assassinations as an excuse for a general slaughter of Protestants in the city. The party of assassins meanwhile, now finished with Coligny's residence, proceeded to their next target, Gabriel de Lorges, Count of Montgomery the former captain of the Scots Guard who had accidentally killed king Henri II in 1559. By now though Paris was descending into chaos, and Montgomery was not unawares to the danger. As such Guise and Aumale were forced into a pursuit, they were unable to catch him and he fled north to Normandie.

=== Siege of La Rochelle and death ===
He was killed at the siege of La Rochelle on 3 March 1573 during one of the many assaults on the bastion de l'Évangile. The king was conscious that his death at the hands of the Protestants had a serious chance of inflaming religious tensions in the capital again, though order was maintained. He would be buried at Aumale, the first member of the Guise family to have a burial in Normandie since Jean de Lorraine in 1472. His nephew Charles, Duke of Mayenne became governor of Burgundy upon his death, the young duke was determined to have a far more hands on role in the administration of Burgundy than Aumale had done.

== Sources ==
- Baird, Henry (1880). History of the Rise of the Huguenots: Vol 2 of 2. Hodder & Stoughton.
- Baumgartner, Frederic (1988). Henry II: King of France 1547-1559. Duke University Press.
- Benedict, Philip (2003). Rouen during the Wars of Religion. Cambridge University Press.
- Carroll, Stuart (1998). Noble Power During the French Wars of Religion: The Guise Affinity and the Catholic Cause in Normandy. Cambridge University Press.
- Carroll, Stuart (2005). Noble Power during the French Wars of Religion: The Guise Affinity and the Catholic Cause in Normandy. Cambridge University Press.
- Carroll, Stuart (2009). Martyrs and Murderers: The Guise Family and the Making of Europe. Oxford University Press.
- Cloulas, Ivan (1985). Henri II. Fayard.
- Diefendorf, Barbara (1991). Beneath the Cross: Catholics and Huguenots in Sixteenth Century Paris. Oxford University Press.
- Durot, Éric (2012). François de Lorraine, duc de Guise entre Dieu et le Roi. Classiques Garnier.
- Harding, Robert (1978). Anatomy of a Power Elite: the Provincial Governors in Early Modern France. Yale University Press.
- George, Hereford Brooke (1875). Genealogical Tables Illustrative of Modern History. Oxford at the Clarendon Press.
- Holt, Mack P. (2005). The French Wars of Religion, 1562-1629. Cambridge University Press.
- Holt, Mack P. (2020). The Politics of Wine in Early Modern France: Religion and Popular Culture in Burgundy, 1477-1630. Cambridge University Press.
- Jordan, W.K., ed. (1966). Chronicle of Edward VI. Folger Shakespeare Library.
- Jouanna, Arlette (1998). Histoire et Dictionnaire des Guerres de Religion. Bouquins.
- Marshall, Rosalind Kay (2006). Queen Mary's Women: Female Relatives, Servants, Friends and Enemies of Mary, Queen of Scots. John Donald.
- Knecht, Robert (2010). The French Wars of Religion, 1559-1598. Routledge.
- Knecht, Robert (2016). Hero or Tyrant? Henry III, King of France, 1574-1589. Routledge.
- Konnert, Mark (2006). Local Politics in the French Wars of Religion: The Towns of Champagne, the Duc de Guise and the Catholic League 1560-1595. Ashgate.
- Michaud, Joseph François; Poujoulat, Jean Joseph François (1839). Nouvelle Collection des Memoires pour servir a l'Histoire de France (in French). Vol. 6. Imprimerie de Firmin Didot Freres.
- Paul, James Balfour (1911). Accounts of the Treasurer. Vol. 9. HM Register House.
- Potter, David (1993). War and Government in the French Provinces: Picardy 1470-1560. Cambridge University Press.
- Ritchie, Pamela E. (2002). Mary of Guise in Scotland, 1548-1560: A Political Career. Tuckwell Press.
- Salmon, J.H.M (1975). Society in Crisis: France during the Sixteenth Century. Metheun & Co.
- Shimizu, J. (1970). Conflict of Loyalties: Politics and Religion in the Career of Gaspard de Coligny, Admiral of France, 1519–1572. Geneva: Librairie Droz.
- Sutherland, Nicola (1962). The French Secretaries of State in the Age of Catherine de Medici. The Athlone Press.
- Sutherland, Nicola (1980). The Huguenot Struggle for Recognition. Yale University Press.
- Thompson, James (1909). The Wars of Religion in France 1559-1576: The Huguenots, Catherine de Medici and Philip II. Chicago University Press.
- Wellman, Kathleen (2013). Queens and Mistresses of Renaissance France. Yale University Press.
- Wood, James (2002). The King's Army: Warfare, Soldiers and Society during the Wars of Religion in France, 1562–1576. Cambridge University Press.

French nobility
Preceded by Francis	Duke of Aumale; 1550–1573	Succeeded by Charles
