= Catherine de Guise =

Catherine de Guise may refer to:

- Catherine de Lorraine (1552–1596), Duchess of Montpensier
- Catherine of Cleves, (1548–1633) was the wife of Henry, Duke of Guise and Duchess of Guise from 1570 to 1588
