= Louise de Brézé =

French noblewoman (1521–1577)

- Born: 1521
- Died: 1577
- Noble family: Brézé (by birth); Lorraine (by marriage)
- Spouse: Claude, Duke of Aumale (m. 1547; died 1573)
- Issue: Henri de Lorraine; Charles, Duke of Aumale; Claude, Chevalier d'Aumale; Catherine, Duchess of Mercœur; Diane, Countess of Roucy; Antoinette-Louise de Lorraine; Marie de Lorraine
- Father: Louis de Brézé
- Mother: Diane de Poitiers

Louise de Brézé (1521–1577), Duchess of Aumale and Dame d'Anet, was a French noblewoman of the 16th century, the second daughter of Diane de Poitiers and Louis de Brézé.

== Early life ==
Louise was born to the influential Norman landowner Louis de Brézé, Governor and Grand Seneschal of Normandy, and his wife Diane de Poitiers. Diane would later become the mistress of Henry II of France, a role which gave her immense power and privileges. Louise's older sister was Françoise de Brézé (c. 1518-1577).

== Estates ==
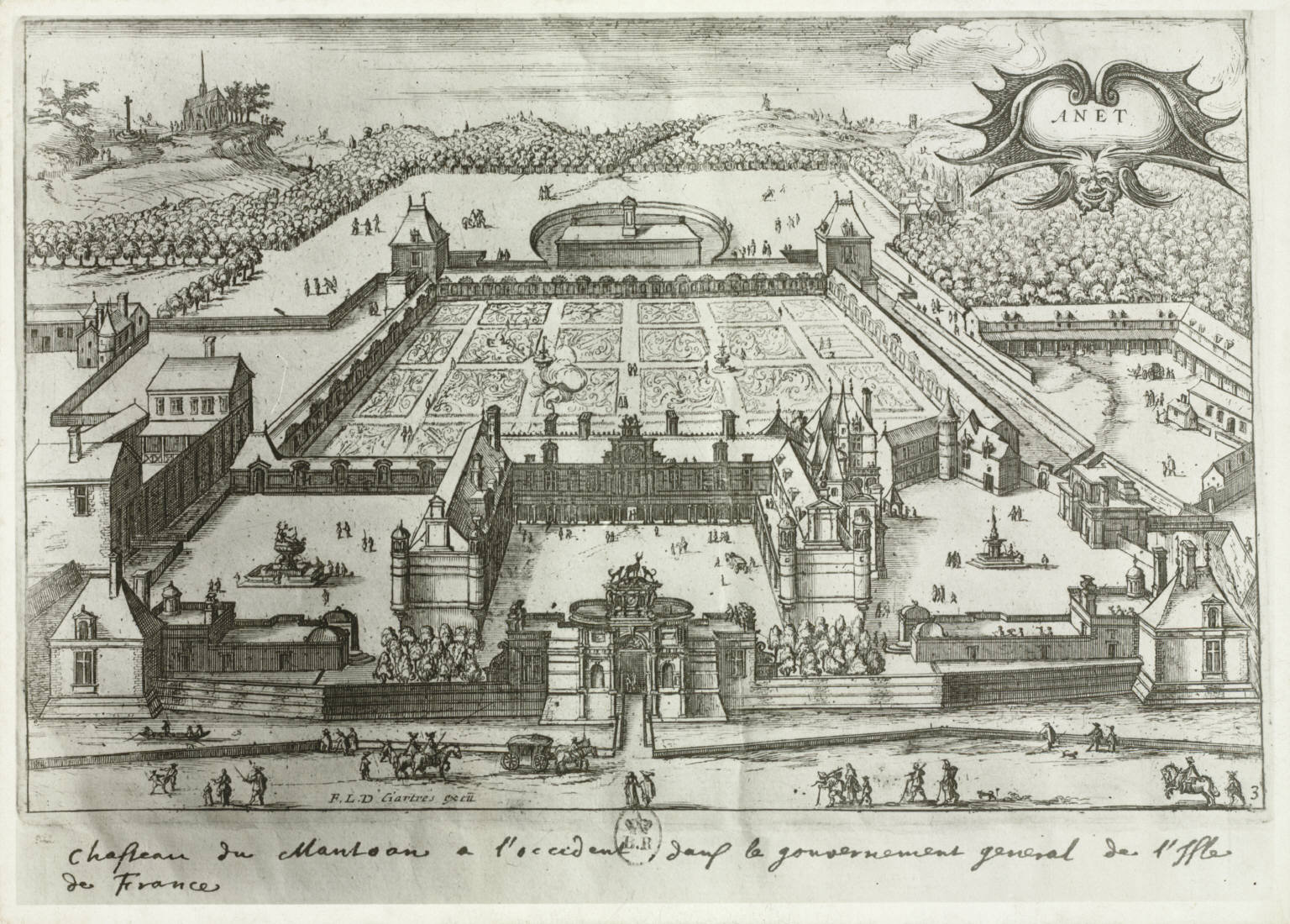
Bird's-eye view of the Château d'Anet, published by François L'Anglois in the early 17th-century

Part of Louise's dowry included the Barony of Mauny, near Rouen. Upon the death of her mother in 1566, her immense estates were divided between Louise and her sister Françoise. Louise inherited the Château d'Anet and its estate. In the 1560s, the Duke and Duchess of Aumale expanded their land holdings in Normandy, buying the countship of Maulévrier, the barony of Bec-Crespin, and other estates. This made Claude one of the greatest landowners in Upper Normandy by the late 1560s. The financial difficulties of Louise's nephew, Henri Robert de la Marck, gave the couple an opportunity to obtain land from Françoise's share of the Brézé inheritance.

== Personal life ==
In 1547, Louise married Claude, Duke of Aumale, a member of the powerful House of Lorraine and son of Claude, Duke of Guise. Socially, Louise and the Brézés were considered the inferiors to the Guises. Gaspard II de Coligny tried to dissuade the Guises from the match, stating that "it was not very honorable for them and that it was worth more to have an inch of authority and favor with honor, than an armful without honor." However, the match gave the Guises the opportunity to strengthen their alliance with Diane, which thus ensured that they would remain in favor with the King.

Together, Louise and Claude had at least 7 children.

- Henri de Lorraine, Count of Saint Vallier (d. 1559), who died at age 10.
- Charles de Lorraine, Duke of Aumale (1566–1631), who married first cousin, Marie de Lorraine, Mademoiselle d'Elbeuf, daughter of the René II de Lorraine, Marquis of Elbeuf and Louise de Rieux, in 1576.
- Claude de Lorraine, chevalier d'Aumale (d. 1591), the Abbot of Bec.
- Catherine de Lorraine, who married Nicholas de Lorraine, Duc de Mercœur in 1569.
- Diane de Lorraine, who married François de Luxembourg, Count of Roucy, in 1576.
- Antoinette-Louise de Lorraine, the Abbess of Notre-Dame de Soissons.
- Marie de Lorraine, the Abbess of Chelles.

Louise was widowed after Claude was killed by a cannonball on 1 August 1573, during the Siege of La Rochelle. Louise transferred ownership of Anet to her son Charles at the time of his marriage in 1576.
