= Garrone =

Garrone is an Italian surname. Notable people with the surname include:

- Andrés Garrone (born 1976), Argentinean footballer
- Gabriel-Marie Garrone (1901–1994), French Cardinal of the Roman Catholic Church
- Laura Garrone (born 1967), Italian former professional tennis player
- María Virginia Garrone (born 1978), Argentine former swimmer
- Matteo Garrone (born 1968), Italian film director
- Nelda Garrone (c. 1880–?), Italian operatic mezzo-soprano
- Riccardo Garrone (disambiguation), multiple people
- Sergio Garrone (1925–2023), Italian director, screenwriter and film producer
- Virginia Galante Garrone (1906–1998), Italian writer

== See also ==
- 16997 Garrone, main-belt asteroid
