= Charles, Duke of Aumale =

Charles I de Lorraine
- Duc d'Aumale
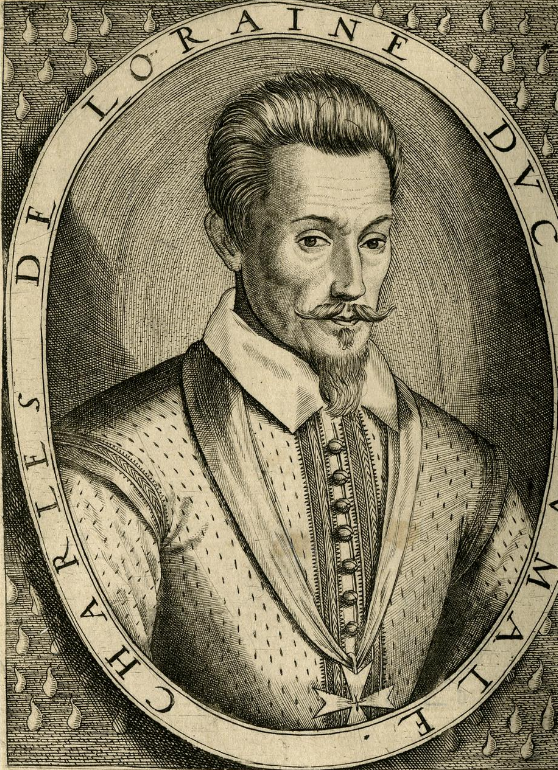
- Contemporary portrait of the duke
- Born: c. 1555
- Died: c. 13 February 1630; Bruxelles, Spanish Netherlands
- Spouse: Marie de Lorraine
- Issue Detail: Anne de Lorraine; Marie de Lorraine
- House: House of Lorraine
- Father: Claude, Duke of Aumale
- Mother: Louise de Brézé

Charles de Lorraine, duc d'Aumale (25 January 1555 – c. 1631, Brussels) was a French noble, military commander and governor during the latter French Wars of Religion. The son of Claude, Duke of Aumale and Louise de Brézé, Aumale inherited his families position in north eastern France, and his fathers title of Grand Veneur. Educated as a fervent Catholic, his clients engineered the creation of the first national Catholic Ligue in 1576, and he continued to support the remnants of the organisation after the Treaty of Bergerac caused much of the ligue to dissolve. During the sixth civil war that the ligue had induced, he fought with the king's brother Alençon at the sieges of La Charité-sur-Loire and Issoire. During the seventh civil war in 1579, he brought his ligueur forces to support the royal army under Marshal Matignon during the siege of La Fère but left on bitter terms with the commander when the siege was brought to a close on generous terms.

In 1584 Alençon died, leaving the Protestant Navarre as heir to the throne. This was unacceptable to Aumale, and the Lorraine family at large, and they engineered the refounding of the ligue to oppose his succession. In the civil war that followed with the crown, Aumale operated in his base of Picardie, seizing the town of Doullens in March and later marching on Reims, before the war was brought to a close in July, with Henri conceding to most of the ligueur demands, though not establishing Aumale as governor of Picardie. In the years that followed Aumale continued a low grade rebellion, and in 1587 captured Doullens again, alongside Corbie and Le Crotoy. In June a plot was engineered to capture the key port town of Boulogne held by a client of Aumale's enemy Épernon, but it failed. The king was outraged by these provocations but felt unable to confront Aumale and openly resume civil war. In early 1588 Aumale made another attempt on the town, this time by direct force as opposed to subterfuge, Épernon and his clients successfully resisted his assaults, and the town held. With an Estates General due to be called in late 1588 after the Day of the Barricades in Paris forced further concessions from the king, Aumale ensured the deputies from Picardie delivered to the main meeting in Blois the message that he should be governor of Picardie, and that Épernon should be divested of Boulogne. The king, increasingly unable to tolerate the corner he was backed into by the ligue, assassinated the duke of Guise, Aumale's cousin, on 23 December. In response much of the country went into rebellion against the crown. Paris which was already in rebellion appointed Aumale its governor, and he proceeded to help the rebel government (the Seize) purge royalists from possessing weapons. Aumale took a central role in the new ligueur administration of the country, and was resultingly declared guilty of lèse majesté in February 1589. In May, his forces attempted to recapture the town of Senlis for the ligue but were badly defeated by a royal force. That August the king was assassinated, revenge for the death of Guise, and the Protestant Navarre succeeded him.

By this time Aumale had been elected governor of Picardie by the local ligueur government, and he clashed with Navarre (now Henri IV) at the Battle of Arques in September 1589. With Henri's conversion to Catholicism in 1593, many of the ligueur towns in Picardie began to defect to the crown, and Aumale's position became increasingly tenuous. By 1595 he was the only member of his family who had not either defected to Navarre or entered negotiations, despite repeated attempts to bring him around. Aumale remained steadfast, and chose exile in the Spanish Netherlands. Though he would later have a change of heart, it was too late, and a death sentence had been pronounced against him for treason by the Paris Parlement. He fought with the Spanish at Amiens and Nieuwpoort in 1600, while his estates in France deteriorated. He died in 1631 in Bruxelles, still a Spanish exile.

== Early life and family ==
=== Family ===
Charles de Lorraine was born in 1555 the eldest surviving son of Claude de Lorraine, duc d'Aumale and Louise de Brézé the wealthy heiress. He had four sisters who made it to adulthood among them Diane de Lorraine and Catherine de Lorraine, who would marry her distant cousin the duke of Mercœur, and one brother the chevalier d'Aumale.

=== Education ===
Aumale received an elite education, alongside many other leading nobles he attended the College de Navarre in Paris, an institution that rivalled the Sorbonne in prestige at the time. In 1572 he attended the Jesuit university at Pont-à-Mousson in Lorraine. He was shaped by the two years he spent in the institution, becoming far more devoutly Catholic than his cousins and resultingly developing a more uncompromising religious worldview as far as compromise with Protestantism was concerned.

=== Inheritance ===
Aumale inherited his father's office of Grand Veneur, one of the Great Offices of State. Under his father hunts had been regular, and the office significant. The post however decreased in importance during the reign of Henri III, who rarely went on hunts. The budget was cut from 70,000 livres to 24,500 livres, forcing Aumale to sell lands to cover the costs of the honour. In 1583, Henri chided Aumale for granting other nobleman too much access to the royal forests for hunting, asking him to be more moderate in the amount of permission he granted to others, so that the forests would still be well stocked for the king.

=== Marriage and children ===
In late 1576, at Joinville, Aumale married his first cousin, Marie de Lorraine, Mademoiselle d'Elbeuf, daughter of the marquis of Elbeuf and Louise de Rieux. Marrying a first cousin required an expensive Papal dispensation. Another of Aumale's cousins the duke of Guise paid the 100,000 livres dowry required for the match. It was hoped this would ease Aumale's financial troubles, however it took a while for Guise to produce the money. At the same time as his wedding, his sister Diane de Lorraine married the prince François de Luxembourg, comte de Roucy. In January 1582, Mademoiselle d'Elbeuf would catch the king's eye, and he quickly became infatuated. During the religious war of the 1590s, Elbeuf would find herself increasingly managing the families financial situation.

Together they had two children. His elder daughter, would marry his kinsmen Henri I, Duke of Nemours, transmitting what was left of the Aumale inheritance to the Nemours, while the younger daughter would marry the Spanish general Ambrogio Spinola.

== Reign of Henri III ==
At the coronation of Henri III on 13 February 1575, the Guise family had pride of place in the ceremony. The duke of Elbeuf took the role of the Grand Chambellan for the coronation, Cardinal Guise took the place of the archbishop of Reims, while the three lay peers of the event were all of the house of Lorraine, the duke's of Guise, Mayenne and Aumale.

=== First ligue ===
The fifth war of religion was brought to a close by the generous Peace of Monsieur which afforded many liberties to the Protestants, and granted their leading aristocratic representatives major concessions. Catholic ligues arose in opposition to many of its terms, and the kingdom was soon pushed back into civil war. The ligue was initially founded by Jacques d'Humières, governor of Péronne, though the driving force was to be found in two lesser nobles, one of them Jacques d'Applaincourt an ensign in Aumale's company.

The king tasked Alençon with leading the royal army, and he conducted a campaign that captured La Charité-sur-Loire and Issoire, before the lack of pay caused his army to disintegrate. Accompanying him in the conduct of this campaign was the duke of Guise, the governor of Berry Claude de La Châtre and Aumale. Meanwhile, Aumale's cousin campaigned successfully against Condé near La Rochelle. With the main royal army dissolved for want of funds, Henri brought the war to a close with the harsher Treaty of Bergerac, which sated many of the ligueur demands, and abolished the ligue. Aumale, who was staying at the Château d'Anet, provided an early copy of the treaty to the leading Norman ligueur Maineville, who took responsibility for rallying the uncompromising ligueurs against the new peace, though most were satisfied with its terms and the organisation faded away.

In April 1578, a famous duel occurred between Caylus favourite for the king and Entragues a favourite of the duke of Guise. In the combat that followed Caylus and one of his seconds were killed, while both of Entragues' seconds were killed. Henri was furious about the loss of two of his favourites, and Entragues fled to the Guise for protection. On 10 May the entire Guise family made their displeasure at the events of the previous month clear through a coordinated departure from court, Aumale leaving with them at this time.

Increasingly unsatisfied with the dilution of honour that had befallen the Ordre de Saint-Michel, Henri decided to found a new order of chivalry, in the hopes of more tightly controlling its recipients. To this end he established the Ordre du Saint-Esprit in 1578. All the Lorraine princes received the honour of elevation as chevaliers, including Aumale. Aumale would be among the first intake to receive the honour alongside the king, Nevers and Mercœur, in 1578 itself. Elbeuf would have to wait until 1581 and Mayenne to 1582.

=== Seventh war of religion ===
In November 1579, Condé, frustrated at his failure to be returned to the governorship of Picardie, seized the Picard town of La Fère, he ravaged the nearby countryside and made an abortive attempt on Doullens. Henri was keen to negotiate with the renegade prince and dispatched Catherine de Medici to speak with him. Condé told the king through Catherine that he rebelled because Aumale was attempting to revitalise the ligue in contravention of the terms agreed in Bergerac. In June 1580, a royal army was dispatched to besiege La Fère under the overall authority of the royalist Marshal Matignon. Aumale joined the army with his own force, which contained many Picard nobles sympathetic to the ligue. Matignon had significant success in the siege, though he was keen to avoid the possibility of Aumale attaining too much glory from the expedition, and offered generous terms to the garrison for their surrender. Aumale, furious that he had not been consulted, stormed from the royal camp without leave.

Henri planned a grand marriage in 1581 between one of his favourites Joyeuse and his queen's half sister Marguerite de Lorraine-Vaudémont, daughter of Mercœur a cousin of the Guise. The Lorraine's turned out in force to act as witness to the marriage, and Aumale was among those who gathered for the signing of the contract on 18 September 1581. The king hoped this marriage would bind the Lorraine family to one of his chief favourites. Further elevations for the king's favourites were arranged with the elevation of Épernon to the honour of being a Duke Peer of the kingdom with seniority over the Lorraine's and all other non royal princes. Aumale and Guise bore witness to the signing of the letters patent in Parlement on 21 November.

=== Financial reform ===
During October 1583, the king, keen to enact financial reform for the kingdom, summoned an Assembly of Notables to meet at Saint-Germain-en-Laye. Each notable of the kingdom was sent a personal invitation, with 68 showing up to the meeting. Several princes attended, among them Aumale and Guise. Protestant grandees did not show, despite Navarre having received an invite. Henri hoped for discussions of tax reform and justice administration to be discussed, however the proceedings became derailed when Cardinal Bourbon fell to his knees and begged the king to outlaw Protestantism. While the talks would ultimately not produce much directly, they influenced the king's policy in 1584 and 1585. Though Aumale was consulted at such occasions, he increasingly chafed over the fact that he lacked a governate, with royal favour in the bestowal of offices devoted to Henri's circle of provincial favourites. Further alienation came from a spat that developed at Saint-Germain between Aumale's brother and Épernon, which pulled in Aumale and the wider Lorraine clan to the defence of their relative.

=== Second ligue ===
Aumale was not present for the family council at Nancy in September which established the reconstitution of the Catholic ligue as the course of action to take in response to the death of Alençon and resulting change of the succession to the Protestant Navarre. Present at the meeting was his brother the chevalier d'Aumale and his cousins, the duke of Guise and the duke of Mayenne. To represent his interests and perspective at the council, he delegated a proxy to stand in for him. Maineville was also present, as a representative for the absent Cardinal Bourbon.

Aumale took responsibility for recruiting among his allied networks in Picardie. In total Aumale could count on around a quarter of the nobility of Picardie to offer support to the ligue. In March 1585 open war with the crown was declared with his cousin Guise's seizure of Châlons-sur-Marne. Aumale for his part captured the town of Doullens, and made an attempt on Abbeville in May but was rebuffed by the town's governor. Henri dispatched the governor of Normandie Joyeuse to return to his governate, in the hopes that he would frustrate attempts by Aumale and his brother Charles I, Duke of Elbeuf to threaten royal authority in the key province. Moving south in June, Aumale seized the villages in the surrounds of Reims. In July Henri conceded to many of the ligueurs demands in the Peace of Nemours: excluding Navarre from the succession, outlawing Protestantism and granting surety towns to the various members of the Guise clan. Guise himself received a collection of towns among them Châlons, Mayenne was granted Beaune, Aumale for his part was granted the town of Rue in Picardie. Aumale did not however receive his larger ambitions, to preserve the towns he had conquered in the past months under his authority and thus be the crowns authority in Picardie.

=== 'Peace' ===
Though formally reconciled with the king, Aumale and his local ligueur allies continued to build their power in Picardie in 1586–7, seizing more towns for the ligue, united by their hatred of the royal favourite Épernon. Among the towns that fell to them were Doullens, Corbie and Le Crotoy. Henri, concerned that Picardie represented the most obvious entry for Spain into the kingdom, dispatched Nevers the governor of the region to act as a countervailing force to Aumale's influence. Alongside the strategic value for inviting an ally into the kingdom, the ligueur control of Picardie also afforded Spain a potential launch pad for their upcoming Armada against England. In negotiations with Guise and Cardinal Bourbon from late May to early June, Henri asked that they yield the towns of Le Crotoy and Doullens which Aumale had seized to the governor of Picardie, Nevers, but they refused to hand them over. In June, a plot was hatched by the ligue to deliver Boulogne to Aumale, the prévôt of the town, Vétus was recruited so that on one of his regular visits to the settlement, he would open the gates and deliver it to Aumale. A man named Poulain was however able to catch wind of the plan, and he warned Henri. Henri in turn alerted the governor Bernet who promptly had Vétus arrested. He then prepared to greet Aumale with cannon shot as he approached the city, Aumale only narrowly avoiding death. Vétus for his part was released through the intervention of Guise.

As Aumale continued to seize towns in the winter of 1587, Mendoza the Spanish ambassador looked on with contentment. In early 1588 Aumale made an attempt on the important port town of Boulogne, the port resisted his assault under the tenacious defence of Épernon's clients Gourdan and Bernet. To reinforce the town against further attempts, Épernon dispatched Louis de Berton-Crillon with 1200 arquebusiers to support the defenders and they were able to slip into the town through Aumale's blockade. Foiled in this effort he raised his siege, and turned his attention to Abbeville, arriving in the suburbs to impede any royalist entry to the town on 16 March. Henri ordered him to cease his acts of aggression and return the towns he was already occupying but Aumale ignored him. Indeed, Aumale infuriated Épernon when, after capturing one of his servants attempting to enter the town, he had him executed.

Later that month Henri met with Épernon, hoping to persuade him that it was necessary to divest him of some of his many offices. Among those offices Henri asked him to abandon was that of Boulogne, which Henri desired to give to a royalist Catholic whose religious credentials could not be doubted like Épernons. Épernon retorted that such concessions were futile, but he would cede his post as governor of Provence and Metz, on the condition that the latter was granted to the count of Brienne. He refused any compromise over his possession of Boulogne. Around this time Aumale was responsible for two assassination attempts against the royal favourite.

=== Day of the barricades ===
During May, Henri attempted a showdown in Paris with the duke of Guise, increasingly unable to tolerate the demands of the ligue upon him. Radical Catholic Parisians responded by rallying to Guise and rioting against the king. To this end the Parisians began constructing barricades throughout the town, the first time this course had been taken. Guise was caught by surprise to see these barricades, and dispatched Aumale and Brissac to investigate their purpose. They reported back that the barricades were intended to impede the movement of royal troops through the city. As the situation increasingly escalated Henri decided he had no choice but to flee Paris, and he departed for Chartres with those who remained loyal to him, leaving the capital in the hands of the ligue.

As a result of the concessions made in the wake of his exile from Paris, an Estates General was called. The ligue hoped to dominate it and force the king into further concessions. Aumale arrived in Amiens to oversee the discussions of the nobility that had assembled in the region, before their departure to Blois. As a result of the influence he exerted, he succeeded in getting the cahiers of the assembled delegates to suggest to the king that he be made governor of Picardie instead of Nevers, that Bernet be relieved from his command in Boulogne and the key town reunited with the rest of the governate. He was aided in his influencing of the delegates by the lieutenant-general of the baillage, who omitted invitations to any supporters of Henri, leading to a situation where only three to four had turned up.

Despite the unity of the broader Guise family in support of the ligue project, the family was not without internal divisions. Aumale and Elbeuf jealously resented the popularity of their cousin the duke of Guise. Suspicions of family disunity was one of the aided the king in resolving on the course he settled on in December, to assassinate the duke of Guise, a plan that was executed on 23 December. After the death of the duke, leadership of the ligue was no longer clear. In the estimation of the Spanish ambassador, either Guise's brother Mayenne, or the governor of Berry, La Châtre were best suited to assuming leadership. The ambassador assessed Aumale poorly, feeling he was too inexperienced to take on such an important task.

=== Assassination of the duke of Guise ===
The Seize which had taken over Paris during the Day of the Barricades, responded to the assassination of the duke of Guise in December 1588 by declaring Henri III deposed. Exercising their newfound authority the Seize appointed Aumale as the ligueur governor of Paris shortly thereafter on 26 December. In this role he oversaw the disarmament of members of the Parisian population who could not be relied upon to support the ligue. To achieve this house searches of the 'politically unreliable', (among them the famous diarist Pierre de L'Estoile) were undertaken. He further received the appointment as ligueur governor of Picardie in February 1589, a province in which he had considerable influence. He was elected to this office by the Picard conseil des état. As part of this role, the ligue afforded him a pension of 10,000 écus.

Aumale and his brother had been collaborating with the Seize in the underground of Paris since 1586, and the chevalier d'Aumale considered himself the seventeenth member of the organisation. Aumale and the Seize took it upon themselves to provide instructions and exhortations to all the major municipal governments of the kingdom. Those which were already ligueur were to be mobilised, while those which had not yet embraced the ligue cause were to join it. In the coming months around half of the largest 50 towns would defect from the crown. Aumale, Mayenne and their ally Nemours were received rapturously by the population of Paris with cries of 'Long live the Catholic princes!'. Paris was filled with Catholic processions, and on 16 February the militia marched through the city in a show of force, accompanied by the clergy, walking barefoot with relics, and leading members of the ligueur nobility, Aumale and the duchesse de Montpensier, sister of the late Guise.

The Seize took it upon itself to purge the Paris Parlement of all suspected royalists in early 1589. Aumale oversaw the remaining judges in their taking of an oath to uphold the ligue on 26 January. On 16 February Aumale assisted in the establishment of a general ligueur council for national administration under the auspices of his cousin Mayenne at the hôtel de ville. The assembly was to cover the intermediary period until such time the Estates General could be reconvened, under ligueur auspices. In total it comprised 54 members, among them five princes; Mayenne, Nemours, Aumale, the chevalier d'Aumale and Chaligny a cousin of Aumale's.

A ligueur coup overthrew the government of Rouen in February 1589. Initially the royal governor Carrouges attempted to maintain his position in the new order, presenting himself as a convert to the ligue cause. However the urban authorities did not take his conversion seriously, and he was replaced as overall authority in the city first by Aumale on an interim basis, then by Meilleraye before finally coming under the authority of Tavannes in early 1590.

=== Lèse majesté ===
The war against the ligue was increasingly total for Henri. To this end, in late February he declared Mayenne, Aumale and the chevalier d'Aumale to be guilty of the crime of lèse majesté for their armed rebellion against him. They were thus stripped of their offices and honours. He did not entirely exclude the possibility of reconciliation, promising he would show clemency if they abandoned their rebellion and returned to obedience. With Henri and Navarre reconciled, now in an alliance against the ligue they began a march on Paris.

=== Senlis ===
The town of Senlis had expelled its ligueur garrison on 26 April in favour of the king. Aumale in collaboration with Maineville, an influential Norman ligueur made an attempt to recapture the town of Senlis, with 6000 foot and 1800 horse in May. Their effort was a failure, as a royal army under Longueville forced him to break off his siege in 17 May and yield the town to them. 1500 ligueur soldiers were killed in the disaster among them Maineville, with Aumale forced to seek refuge in Saint-Denis. The destruction of the ligueur force by an inferiorly sized royal army was cause for celebration in the royalist camp, and a Te Deum was performed at Tours.

== Reign of Henri IV ==
=== Arques ===
The attempt on Paris ruined by the assassination of Henri on 1 August, Navarre, now styling himself Henri IV, entered Normandie. He quickly received the submission of Caen and Dieppe to the royal cause, however Rouen, centre of the ligueur government in Normandie proved more resilient. Aumale and Marshal Brissac dispatched an urgent appeal to Mayenne to provide support to the city. Henri quickly decided against putting Rouen to siege, and set himself up at the Château d'Arques. In September the ligueur forces came to Arques to face him, among them Aumale and his brother. Henri achieved victory in the encounter, and false reports spread that both Aumale and his brother had been killed in the combat, and Nemours wounded.

While Épernon was travelling at the head of a body of horse near Corbie, Aumale nearly succeeded in ambushing him, but was unable to capture or kill his hated enemy. Henri for his part returned to Rouen in late 1591 and put the city under a full siege. The situation in the city looked dire, but it was relieved by the duke of Parma and his Spanish forces. The elated population praised Mayenne, Aumale and Guise for their delivery.

=== Beginning of the end ===
By 1594 the situation facing the ligue in Picardie was increasingly bleak, Château Thierry, Amiens, Noyon and Beauvais which had been under Aumale's authority as governor rose up against him alongside other towns in the region, forcing out the ligueur administrations, and restoring their loyalty to the crown. Aumale had even sacked the town of Aumale to punish the citizens for yielding too easily to the royalists. To support his war effort Aumale sold the border town of La Fère to the Spanish. He was also increasingly compelled to mortgage large parts of his holdings to keep the war effort stable, and divested himself of parts of his seigneurie of Boves to provide even more cash.

=== Holdout ===
Now negotiating with Henri, Mayenne proposed his return to the royal fold in return for the following conditions, his maintenance as governor of Bourgogne, the young duke of Guise as governor of Champagne and Aumale as governor of Picardie, alongside various other concessions. Increasingly isolated with the prospect of the defection of Mayenne to the royalist camp, Aumale was unwilling to yield like the rest of his family, despite receiving generous offers from the king for his return to the crown. Indeed, his commitment to the ligue had hardened after the king's conversion to Catholicism. As such he was forced into a Spanish exile during 1595, where he entered Felipe II's service in the Low Countries.

While Henri was absent from Paris, the Paris Parlement took the opportunity to declare him guilty of lèse majesté and sentenced him to death for his treason. Henri was displeased, as he still desired to bring Aumale back into the French fold. Aumale for his part, now regretted his earlier defiance, and was desperate to be returned to the king's favour, he and his wife besieged the king with letters but to no avail. He further kept in touch with Mercœur who assured him that his coming to terms with Henri was only temporary, and that he still had the fire of rebellion in him, though he died before any such plans could come to fruition.

=== Exile ===
In 1597 Aumale led a Spanish force at Amiens against Henri and expanded his Spanish service to taking command against the Dutch in 1600 during the siege of Nieuwpoort. Alongside their legal troubles, the families lands were increasingly in ruin, his creditors seized Boves in 1606, and Ivry in 1609. In 1631 he died in Bruxelles, still in exile.

== Sources ==
- Babelon, Jean-Pierre (2009). Henri IV. Fayard.
- Benedict, Philip (2003). Rouen during the Wars of Religion. Cambridge University Press.
- Carroll, Stuart (2005). Noble Power During the French Wars of Religion: The Guise Affinity and the Catholic Cause in Normandy. Cambridge University Press.
- Carroll, Stuart (2011). Martyrs and Murderers: The Guise Family and the Making of Europe. Oxford University Press.
- Chevallier, Pierre (1985). Henri III: Roi Shakespearien. Fayard.
- Constant, Jean-Marie (1996). La Ligue. Fayard.
- George, Hereford Brooke (1875). Genealogical Tables Illustrative of Modern History. Oxford at the Clarendon Press.
- Harding, Robert (1978). Anatomy of a Power Elite: the Provincial Governors in Early Modern France. Yale University Press.
- Jouanna, Arlette (1998). Histoire et Dictionnaire des Guerres de Religion. Bouquins.
- Knecht, Robert (2010). The French Wars of Religion, 1559-1598. Routledge.
- Knecht, Robert (2014). Catherine de' Medici. Routledge.
- Knecht, Robert (2016). Hero or Tyrant? Henry III, King of France, 1574-1589. Routledge.
- Konnert, Mark (2006). Local Politics in the French Wars of Religion: The Towns of Champagne, the Duc de Guise and the Catholic League 1560-1595. Ashgate.
- Pitts, Vincent (2012). Henri IV of France: His Reign and Age. Johns Hopkins University Press.
- Roberts, Penny (1996). A City in Conflict: Troyes during the French Wars of Religion. Manchester University Press.
- Le Roux, Nicolas (2000). La Faveur du Roi: Mignons et Courtisans au Temps des Derniers Valois. Champ Vallon.
- Le Roux, Nicolas (2006). Un Régicide au nom de Dieu: L'Assassinat d'Henri III. Gallimard.
- Salmon, J.H.M (1979). Society in Crisis: France during the Sixteenth Century. Metheun & Co.
- Sutherland, Nicola (1962). The French Secretaries of State in the Age of Catherine de Medici. The Athlone Press.

French nobility
Preceded by Claude	Duke of Aumale; 1573–1595	Succeeded by Anne with Henri I, Duke of Nemours
