= Riccardo Garrone =

Riccardo Garrone may refer to

- Riccardo Garrone (actor), (1926–2016) Italian actor
- Riccardo Garrone (entrepreneur), (1936–2013) Italian entrepreneur and football chairman
