= Claude de Lorraine, chevalier d'Aumale =

French nobleman and military commander (1564-1591)

Claude de Lorraine
- Abbot of Bec
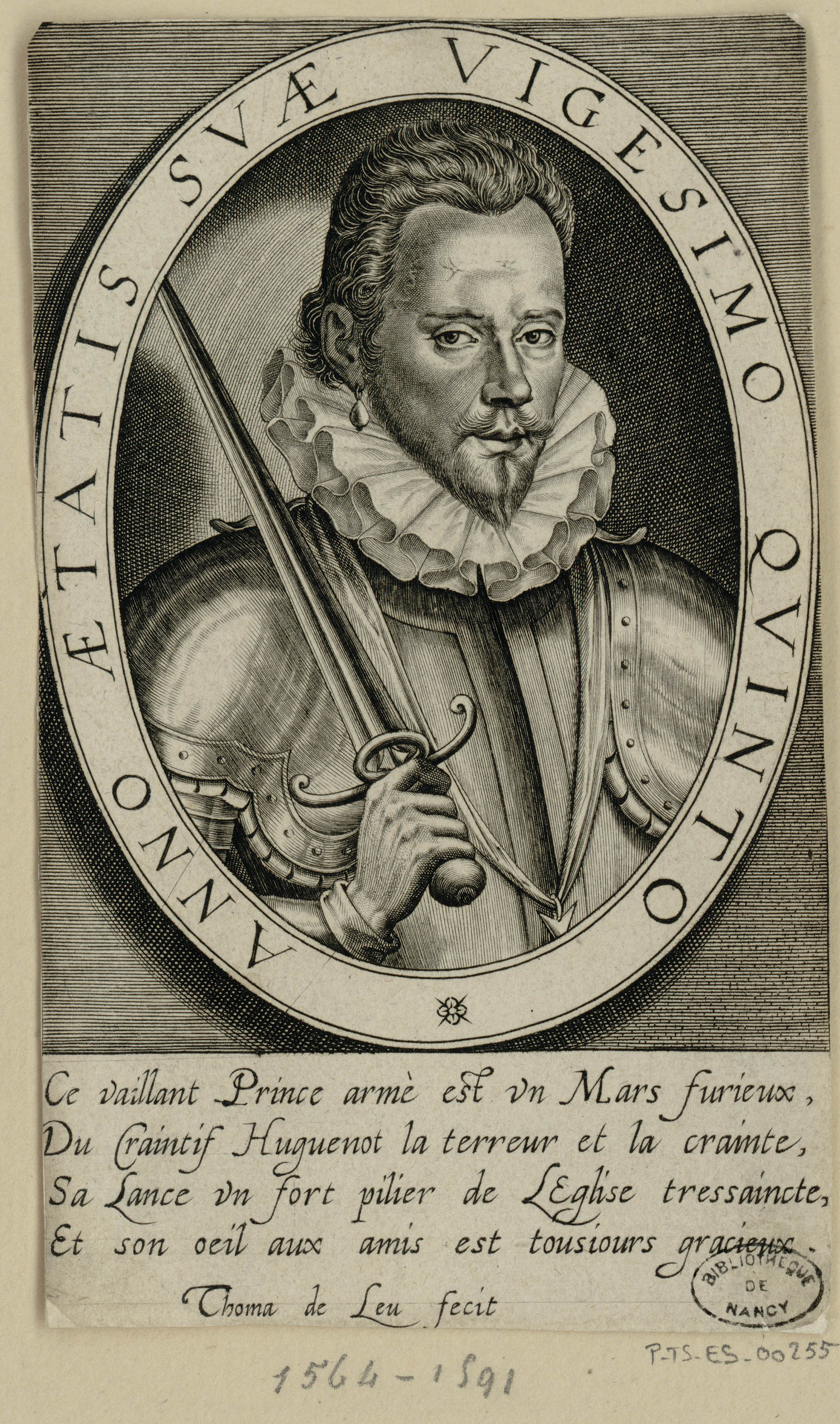
- Ligueur portrait of the chevalier
- Born: 13 December 1564
- Died: 3 January 1591 (aged 26); Saint-Denis
- Noble family: House of Guise
- Father: Claude, Duke of Aumale
- Mother: Louise de Brézé

Claude de Lorraine, chevalier d'Aumale (13 December 1564 – 3 January 1591) was a French churchman, noble and military commander during the French Wars of Religion. The second son of Claude, Duke of Aumale and Louise de Brézé, Aumale was destined for a life in the church. His uncles Cardinal Lorraine and Cardinal Guise ensured that he was granted many abbeys, that brought him a sizable income. At the age of 19 in 1583, he travelled to Malta to perform his service as a Knight of the Order of Saint John, finding success in his campaign.

Returning to France, he brought his family into dispute with the king's favourite Épernon, and began working with the radical Seize faction of the Catholic ligue, which seized control of Paris during the Day of the Barricades. In 1589, after the assassination of his cousin by Henri III Aumale and the ligue at large entered open war with the king, who was forced into an alliance with the Protestant Navarre. Forces under Aumale succeeded in almost catching the king at Tours in early May, but were driven back when reinforcements arrived. At another engagement later that month, Aumale was driven from Senlis by troops under the duke of Longueville. With the assassination of Henri III in August, the ligue was left to fight Navarre, now styling himself Henri IV. In March he participated in the seminal Battle of Ivry, commanding the right flank of the ligue army. He was bested by forces under the duke of Biron and his father Marshal Biron. In the wake of the battle Navarre attempted to besiege Paris, with Aumale leading the defence alongside the duke of Nemours and the Seize. They were saved from defeat by the duke of Parma, who brought a Spanish army to their aid. Pivoting his strategy to the northern surrounds of Paris, Navarre successfully rebuffed an attack by Aumale upon the suburb of Saint-Denis on 3 January, during which Aumale was killed. He was a key martyr for the ligue which eulogised their 'Catholic warrior' in pamphlets.

== Early life and family ==
Claude de Lorraine was born in 1564, the second son of Claude, Duke of Aumale and the great Norman landholder Louise de Brézé.

=== Ecclesiastical empire ===
Destined for an ecclesiastical career, Aumale was granted several abbeys in commendam, bequeathed to him by his guardian uncle Cardinal Lorraine. The income of these various holdings afforded him an annual income of 40,000 livres. In 1572, Cardinal Guise resigned the lucrative Bec Abbey to Aumale. This brought him a further 24,000 livres in income, which was twice the revenue of his brothers Duchy of Aumale. On Cardinal Guise's death in 1578, he inherited further ecclesiastical possessions.

=== Relationships ===
Despite his ecclesiastical holdings, Claude had a mistress, La Dame de Sainte-Beuve. She was sister in law to Jean de Bauquemare, who became one of the ligueur council of 12 that took control of Rouen in February 1589.

== Reign of Henri III ==
=== Knight of the order ===
In 1583, Aumale, as a knight of the order of Saint John, was expected to travel to Malta. His brother, the duke of Aumale, borrowed 42,000 livres to equip a ship for the chevalier. Aumale's time in Malta was successful, and the prisoners he took were ransomed to invest in improvements to the galley. Upon returning to France, Aumale entered a quarrel with Épernon, favourite of the king. His brother defended him and the dispute quickly became one between the Guise at large and Épernon.

=== Seize ===
During May 1588 the king was expelled from Paris, and a coup government under the ligueur organisation known as the Seize took charge of the city. The chevalier d'Aumale, and his elder brother the duke of Aumale had been involved with the Seize for several years by 1588, at least since 1586. The chevalier boasted that he was the seventeenth member of the Seize.

=== Rouen ===
Shortly after the assassination of the duke of Guise Rouen defected from the crown to the ligue, the royal militia commander Dyel had at first been complacent about the threat of a takeover, until he overheard one of his men bemoaning the fact that Aumale was not in the city to lead them. Many of the ligueurs of Rouen considered him an exemplar idol. Across France the majority of the major cities defected to the ligue.

=== Tours ===
Henri III, now on the back foot, joined forces with the Protestant Navarre, forming a compact in April at Plessis-lès-Tours. The two men began a drive on ligueur controlled Paris. The duke of Mayenne, brother to the deceased duke moved to intercept them. His advance guard, led by the chevalier d'Aumale met the king accompanied by only a small party on the north bank of the Loire, near Tours on 8 May. The king fled back to the gates of Tours with Aumale in pursuit. Aumale entered the suburbs but was stopped at the bridge across the river by Crillon. After offering brief resistance Crillon was overwhelmed. The king appealed for support from elements of Navarre's army, under La Trémoille and Châtillon, who arrived late in the day to reinforce the bridge. The ligueurs on the other bank under Aumale mocked the Protestant force, hoping to induce a rash attack. By now Mayenne and Navarre arrived to take charge of their forces, and after a hard night of fighting, in which Henri fought personally, Mayenne withdrew from the surrounds of Tours, destroying the suburbs as he departed. During the fighting, one of the Quarante Cinq, Henri's bodyguards who had killed the duke of Guise, was killed on the field. Aumale and Mayenne's troops mutilated the body and it was taken back to Paris to be displayed.

On 17 May, royal forces put the town of Senlis to siege. With the duke of Longueville leading the assault, supported by forced under La Noue, the defenders, among them Aumale and Balagny the governor of Cambrai were forced to flee. Aumale having been wounded in the fighting. The royalist forces advanced on Paris from two directions, before the assassination of the king on 1 August through them into chaos.

== Reign of Henri IV ==
=== Battle of Ivry ===
In early 1590, Navarre campaigned in Normandie, hoping to bring Mayenne out into the open for a decisive confrontation. To this end he divided his forces, hoping to induce Mayenne to descend on a vulnerable target. Part of his army besieged Dreux, while the rest maintained their presence in Normandie. Mayenne approached Dreux to challenge him, and Henri hurriedly called up his other forces under the baron de Rosne. The two sides met at Ivry on 14 March 1590. Navarre's right, led by squadrons under Gaspard de Schomberg faced off against units under the command of the chevalier d'Aumale who had with him a Spanish Walloonian company. During the combat that followed Aumale had an inconclusive struggled with the duke of Biron which ended when Biron's father, Marshal Biron brought in reserves that overwhelmed Aumale. The battle was a decisive victory for Navarre.

=== Saint-Denis ===
Navarre again made an attempt to capture Paris in 1590, but was again confounded, This time by the arrival of the army of the duke of Parma. Prior to Parma's arrival, the defence of the city had been led by the duke of Nemours, and the chevalier d'Aumale who worked in an uneasy alliance with the Seize. Unwilling to fully cut his losses, Navarre decided to conduct a more limited objective of controlling the northern Parisian basin. The chevalier d'Aumale, who had been in Paris during the siege made an attempt to retake the suburb of Saint-Denis from Navarre. The Protestant forces were able to rebuff Aumale, killing the chevalier during the battle. Navarre laughed when he learned the attack had been on the feast day of Saint Geneviève, .

Ligueur pamphleteers characterised him as a Christian warrior and a martyr for the holy cause, his loss was greatly mourned as he had been one of the ligues chief heroes.

== Sources ==
- Babelon, Jean-Pierre (2009). Henri IV. Fayard.
- Carroll, Stuart (2005). Noble Power during the French Wars of Religion: The Guise Affinity and the Catholic Cause in Normandy. Cambridge University Press.
- Chevallier, Pierre (1985). Henri III: Roi Shakespearien. Fayard.
- George, Hereford Brooke (1875). Genealogical Tables Illustrative of Modern History. Oxford at the Clarendon Press.
- Knecht, Robert (2010). The French Wars of Religion, 1559-1598. Routledge.
- Knecht, Robert (2016). Hero or Tyrant? Henry III, King of France, 1574-1589. Routledge.
- Pitts, Vincent (2012). Henri IV of France: His Reign and Age. Johns Hopkins University Press.
- Salmon, J.H.M (1975). Society in Crisis: France during the Sixteenth Century. Metheun & Co.
