= Catherine of Lorraine (1551–1596) =

Catherine-Marie de Lorraine
- Duchess of Montpensier
- Born: 18 July 1551; Joinville, France
- Died: 5 May 1596 (aged 44); Paris, France
- Spouse: Louis de Bourbon, Duke of Montpensier
- House: Guise
- Father: Francis, Duke of Guise
- Mother: Anna d'Este

Catherine-Marie de Lorraine, Duchess of Montpensier (18 July 1551 – 5 May 1596), was a French princess from the house of Guise who played a leading political role in the Catholic League during the French Wars of Religion.

== Early years ==
Catherine-Marie de Lorraine (or de Guise) was born on 18 July 1551. (Note: Many genealogists perpetuate the error that Catherine was born on 18 July 1552 rather than the correct date of 18 July 1551. The earlier date is confirmed by a letter from Charles de Cossé, Count of Brissac, to the Duke of Guise dated 4 August 1551 congratulating him on the birth of his daughter.) She was the second child of Francis, Duke of Guise, and Anna d'Este. Her elder brother was Henry I, Duke of Guise (1550–88), known as the Balafré. Her younger brothers included Charles, Duke of Mayenne (1554–1611) and Louis II, Cardinal of Guise (1555–88). She grew up during the French Wars of Religion, a civil war between Protestant and Catholic factions. In 1570 she married Louis, Duke of Montpensier, of the Bourbon family.

Louis of Montpensier died on 23 September 1582 leaving Catherine a widow at 30 years of age. She did not remarry. She was known at the court of Henry III of France as a malicious intriguer. She was taunted for her limp, and in return was strongly hostile to the king's favorites. She was also opposed to the Bourbons, her relations by marriage. She became the heroine of the Holy League that formed to oppose Henry III.

== Ascendancy of the Catholic League ==
On 7 July 1585 Henry III was forced to sign the Treaty of Nemours with Catherine's brother Henry I of Guise and the Catholic League. On 18 July 1585 he signed an edict that cancelled all previous edicts of tolerance, paid mercenaries of the Catholic League from the royal treasury and prohibited Protestantism. The Guise party received favors and positions, while Henry of Navarre, the future Henry IV of France was disinherited. However, the king did not give the Guises enough support to defeat the Protestants, and the conflict dragged out. Henry III proposed to marry Catherine to his favorite Jean Louis de Nogaret de La Valette, but Catherine flatly refused to marry him.

Jacques Auguste de Thou and Pierre de L'Estoile, both hostile to Catherine, portrayed her as directing League propaganda, and called her "the governess of the League in Paris." In July 1587 a board was erected in the cloister of Saint Sévérin that represented the sufferings of Catholics under Queen Elizabeth I of England. The final scene was the execution of Mary, Queen of Scots. It was generally thought that Catherine de Montpensier was responsible for the board, which was viewed by many people each day. The board probably used images from the Theatrum Crudelitatum Haereticorum Nostri Temporis of Richard Rowlands, who had been paid large sums of money by King Philip II of Spain for activities that would undermine support for Henry III.

Catherine's enemies were not inactive. The Library of the Duchess of Montpensier, published in 1587, tried to discredit her and other women of the court with a satirical list of imagined titles that implied sexual voracity and infidelity. One was entitled "Inventory of the Proportions of French Cocks, with the Great Balls of Lorraine, by Madame de Nermoutier". This referred to rumoured liaisons between Charlotte de Sauve, Marquise de Noirmoutier, with Henry of Guise, Henry of Navarre and the king's brother Francis, Duke of Anjou.

Catherine controlled the media and sent bulletins to the preachers telling them what news to preach. According to Pierre de L'Estoile she bribed the preachers and curates to convey her message with money and offers of bishoprics, abbeys and other valuable offices. She could do this since her brother Louis II Cardinal de Lorraine was the leading prelate in France. In January 1588 Henry III asked her to leave Paris due to her hostile activity. He said she had done more for the League than any army.

Fighting broke out in Paris on 12 May 1588 and about 60 of the king's soldiers were killed. The next day the Bastille fell, Catherine's brother Henry I of Guise took control of Paris and Henry III of France fled to his Château de Blois. The Parlement of Paris began a trial of Henry III. Catherine now considered herself queen of Paris. She took to wearing a pair of scissors at her belt that she said she would use to tonsure the king before locking him up in a monastery.

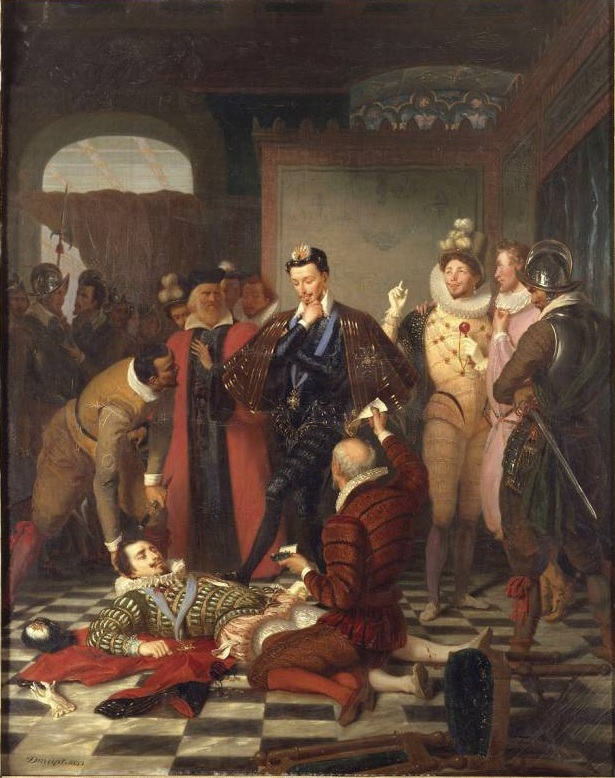
Henry III with his foot on the corpse of Henry I of Guise

On 23 December 1588 Henry III of France arranged for Henry I of Guise to be assassinated at the Château de Blois. The next day Catherine's younger brother Cardinal Louis II was also assassinated at the Château de Blois. The bodies of both men were burned and their ashes thrown into the Seine. The deaths of two of her brothers confirmed Catherine in her hatred of King Henry III of France. Her third brother Charles, Duke of Mayenne, now became the leader of the league. Catherine was a woman warrior in the French tradition. In 1588 she led the resistance to Henry of Navarre wearing a soldier's helmet and brandishing a sword.

== Defeat of the Guise party ==
The king became reconciled with his brother-in-law Henry of Navarre, and the two gathered an army to retake Paris. On 1 August 1589 Henry III formally recognized Henry of Navarre as his heir. A few hours later Henry III was assassinated by a fanatical League adherent and member of the Dominican Third Order. Catherine boasted of having caused the assassination of Henry III as an enemy of her family and of the League. According to Paul Lacroix,

The man who brought the first news to the Duchess of Montpensier (Catherine Marie de Lorraine) and her mother, Mme de Nemours, was received as a saviour; the duchess flung her arms round his neck and kissed him, crying, ' Ah, my friend, welcome! But it is true, is it not? Is the scoundrel, the traitor, the tyrant, dead? God, how you relieve me! I am only crossed by one thing; that is, that he did not know before he died that it was I who had him killed!

Catherine now directed her hatred towards Henry of Navarre. To end the conflict he announced that he would become a Catholic. During the struggle that continued from 1589 to 1594 Catherine, her mother Anna d'Este and her sister-in-law Catherine of Cleves occupied the Hôtel de la Reine in Paris. In 1593 Charles of Mayenne convoked the States-General in Paris and tried unsuccessfully to be elected King of France with Catherine's support. On 27 February 1594 Henry of Navarre was crowned Henry IV of France at Chartres Cathedral. The leading noblemen supported the coronation, and on 22 March 1594 Henry IV entered Paris in triumph.

Henry IV showed clemency and generosity to Catherine. After Paris surrendered on 22 March 1594 she asked if there was someone who would stab her in the breast, but as soon as he entered the city Henry IV sent her greetings and told her she was under his personal protection. He received her that evening and played cards with her. In 1595 there were rumours that the Parlement wanted to seek the perpetrators of the disorders caused by the League. Catherine was terrified and sought refuge with Catherine de Bourbon in the Château de Saint-Germain-en-Laye. She later returned to Paris. Thunder was heard during the night that she died on 6 May 1596. Pierre de L'Estoile wrote in his diary that he was sure this was caused by the passing of her malignant and tempestuous spirit.

== Sources ==
- "Catherine-Marie de Lorraine", Histoire de l'Europe et de la Méditerranée (in French)
- Coates, Colin MacMillan; Morgan, Cecilia Louise (2002), Heroines and History: Representations of Madeleine de Verchères and Laura Secord, University of Toronto Press, ISBN 978-0-8020-8330-2
- Guiffrey, George Maurice (1866), Lettres inédites de Dianne de Poytiers (in French), Vve J. Renouard
- Hare, Augustus John Cuthbert (1888), Walks in Paris, G. Routledge and sons
- La Rédaction (5 May 2013), "6 mai 1596 : mort de la duchesse de Montpensier (Catherine-Marie de Lorraine)", La France pittoresque
- Sully, Maximilien de Béthune duc de (1778), Memoirs of Maximilian de Bethune: Duke of Sully, Prime Minister to Henry the Great, Containing the History of the Life and Reign of that Monarch, and His Own Administration Under Him, J. Rivington (and others)
- Wilkinson, A. (2004-06-10), Mary Queen of Scots and French Public Opinion, 1542-1600, Palgrave Macmillan UK, ISBN 978-0-230-28615-3
