= Charles Emmanuel de Savoie, Duke of Nemours =

Late 16th-century French noble and governor

Charles-Emmanuel de Savoie
- duc de Nemours prince de Genevois
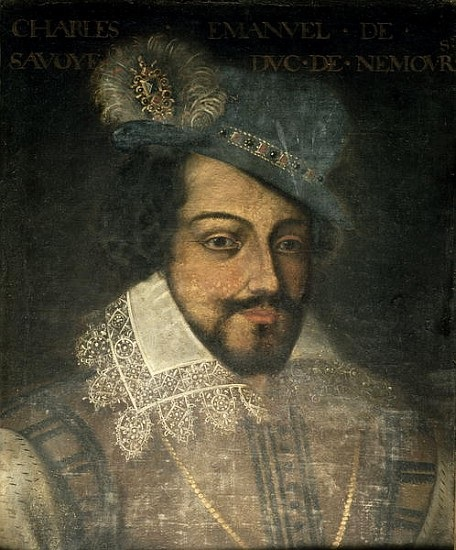
- Charles-Emmanuel de Savoie portrayed in the gallery of portraits of the Château de Beauregard, 17th century
- Born: c. 1567
- Died: 13 August 1595; Château d'Annecy
- Noble family: House of Savoy
- Father: Jacques de Savoie, duke of Nemours
- Mother: Anne d'Este

Charles-Emmanuel de Savoie, prince de Genevois and duc de Nemours (c. 1567 – 13 August 1595) was a French prince étranger, governor, military commander and rebel during the latter French Wars of Religion. The eldest son of Jacques de Savoie and Anne d'Este, Nemours was a member of a prominent princely family. He entered French political at the age of 18 as a partisan of the second Catholic ligue, rallying cavalry to the rebel army, and assisting in forcing Henri III to capitulate to their demands. In the following years, the king was compelled by the terms of the peace to make war against Protestantism. The former rebel ligueurs hoped the 'cowed' king would afford them advantage, but Henri was keen to dilute the authority of the former rebels. As a result Nemours' position as colonel-general of the light cavalry was diluted with several appointments of royal favourites. During this period, Nemours coveted the governate of the Lyonnais, which had previously been held by his father before 1571. When François de Mandelot, who held the office, died in November 1588, Henri was compelled to recognise Nemours as the new governor due to his political weakness. Frustrated at his continued capitulations to the ligue, on 23 December 1588, Henri assassinated the leader of the ligue the duke of Guise. In the wake of the assassination, Nemours and other ligueur leaders were arrested by the king. Nemours was however quickly able to bribe his guards and secure freedom.

Arriving in ligueur held Paris, Nemours received a warm welcome from the radical Catholics of the city. He then headed to Lyon which had declared itself for the ligue in February 1589. Nemours, granted an initially warm welcome from the ligueurs in the city, set to work imposing himself on their structures before departing to join the main ligueur army in the north. He fought at the two royalist victories of Arques and Ivry. The Protestant Henri IV, the royalist candidate for king followed up his victories by besieging Paris. Nemours led the defence of the city in conjunction with the chevalier d'Aumale, putting down a royalist rebellion, before the city was saved for the ligueurs by a Spanish army under the duke of Parma. Returning to his governate in 1591, Nemours found himself increasingly in conflict with the archbishop of Lyon, who led the main ligueur faction in the city. In 1592 he campaigned into Dauphiné against the royalist commander Lesdiguières, and capturing Vienne. He participated in the ligueur Estates General of 1593, where he was among the candidates to become king. By his next return to Lyon, his tyrannical treatment of the city had become intolerable, and he was deposed in a coup by the archbishop, and detained in the citadel. In February 1594 the city would be delivered to the royalists, and Pomponne de Bellièvre would arrive to negotiate with Nemours for the capitulation of his brother, but he refused to cooperate. On 25 July he escaped his second captivity, and continued his rebellion. By mid 1595 he was forced into exile by declining military fortunes, and died of a fever on 13 August of that year.

== Early life and family ==
Charles-Emmanuel de Savoie was born in 1567 the eldest son of Jacques de Savoie and Anne d'Este. He had a younger brother, Henri de Savoie, marquis of Saint-Sorlin who was born in 1572.

Anne d'Este had great ambitions for her son's marriage. She sought a match with Christine de Lorraine for him. Christine was a granddaughter of Catherine de Medici, mother to the king. Henri was prepared to countenance such an advantageous prospect, but only if the Lorraine family returned from their scheming to royal obedience. Therefore it would not transpire and he would remain unmarried.

== Reign of Henri III ==
=== Second Catholic ligue ===
During July 1584, the brother to the king and his heir Alençon died. The kingdom was thus moved to a succession crisis as by the laws of succession the next in line was the king's distant cousin the Protestant king of Navarre. In opposition to this succession and other grievances concerning access to royal favour, the duke of Guise and the wider Lorraine family formed the nucleus of a new Catholic ligue. In early 1585, the ligue entered a state of war with the crown. Nemours rallied to the cause in support of his kinsmen. As part of the recruitment drive to build up an army in opposition to the royal forces, he was charged to bring to bear 600 Italian horsemen. At this time he was prince de Genevois while his father held the ducal office. By June 1585 the main ligueur army had reached 25,000 men and 2000 horse, excluding their subsidiary armies. Henri was left with little alternative but to capitulate to the ligue, and in the Treaty of Nemours he agreed to exclude Navarre from the succession, commit to a war against heresy and grant various towns and cities to the ligueur leaders.

=== Chevau-léger ===
After the crisis of the war with the ligue, Henri sort to reinforce the position of his favourites in control over the military. To this end in January 1586 Joyeuse was made commander of 12 companies of light horse, which were reclassified as a component of the royal guard. This aroused the fury of Guise, and also Nemours who by this time had acquired for himself the position of colonel-general of the light cavalry and saw this dilution of his authority for what it was. When Nemours arrived in Paris shortly thereafter on 1 February, Joyeuse and the other chief favourite of the king Épernon were there to greet him. In contravention to the behaviour expected of them upon the arrival of a prince, neither dismounted their horses to greet him.

Nemours' authority over the light cavalry was further attacked in 1587 after the Battle of Coutras when, at Épernon's request, his brother the seigneur de La Valette was installed as maître de camp for the light cavalry.

=== Lyonnais ===
The governor of the Lyonnais since 1571, François de Mandelot was aware that the duke of Nemours coveted the position, which prior to 1571 had been held by his father. To this end Mandelot sought to walk a careful line in his governorship between appeasing the moderate ligueurs in the city and remaining a loyal servant of the king.

In November 1588, while the Estates General was in progress, Mandelot died. Nemours was appointed by the king to succeed him to the high office on 24 November. The king had promised the position to his secretary of state Villeroy who had married Mandelot's daughter, but the hopes of being able to successfully appease the ligue faction were still alive in November. Having established himself in the position, Nemours would appoint the seneschal of Lyon the sieur de Bothéon as lieutenant-general of the province.

=== Assassination of the duke of Guise ===
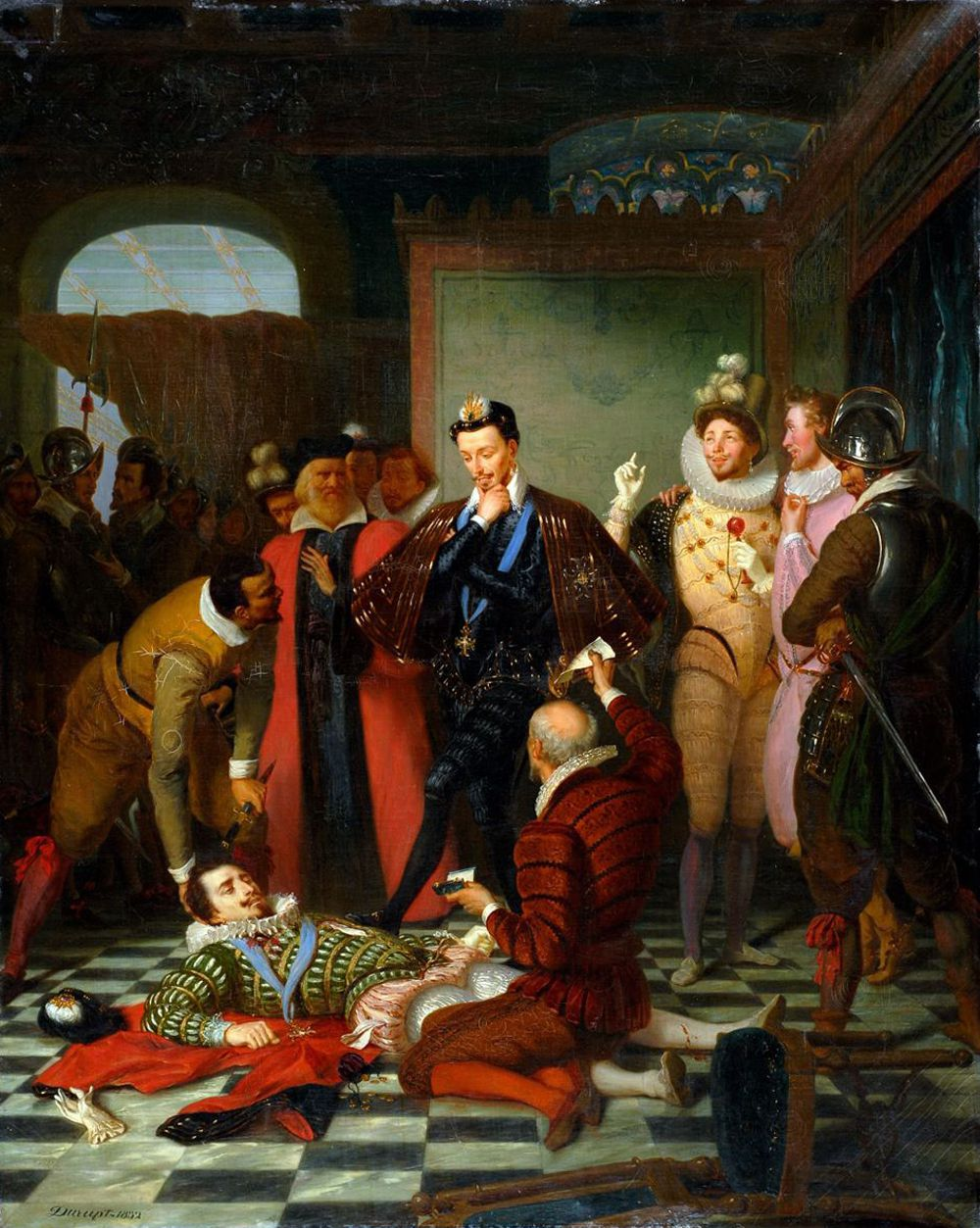
Assassination of Henri I, Duke of Guise, by Henri III, in 1588. Painting by Charles Durupt in the Château de Blois, where the attack took place.

Despite being politically allied to his half brother the duke of Guise the relationship was not without issues. Guise's particular popularity inspired jealousy in Nemours and other members of the Lorraine family. This jealousy contributed to the king's feelings that he could dispose of his most powerful enemy without encountering overwhelming opposition.

Having committed to the execution of assassinating the duke of Guise it was necessary for Henri to secure control over as many of the dukes political allies as he could to avoid them retaliating against the move. In the arrests that followed Nemours was imprisoned, alongside Guise's cousin the duke of Elbeuf, the ligueur candidate for the throne Cardinal Bourbon, the archbishop of Lyon, a prominent ally of the Lorraine family and the duke's young son the prince of Joinville. Nemours' mother Anne d'Este would also be arrested on a short term basis.

Despite this arrest, when he visited his ill mother Catherine de' Medici to tell her what he had just done, he assured her that having dealt with the threat to his authority embodied by the duke of Guise, he had nothing but affection for Elbeuf, Nemours and the duke of Lorraine.

=== First escape ===
His imprisonment would not be a long one, quickly escaping the Château d'Amboise where he was held, during January through the expedient of bribing his guards. He arrived in ligueur controlled Paris on 1 February and on 12 February, he was received at the church of Saint-Jean-de-Grève alongside Guise's brother Mayenne and cousin, the duke of Aumale. All three were received rapturously by the fiercely Catholic crowd, who cried 'Long live the Catholic princes!'. Aumale would be elevated by the Parisian ligue becoming governor of Paris on 26 December. On 16 February a general assembly was held at Paris' hôtel de ville. Present were Mayenne; Aumale; the chevalier d'Aumale, brother of Aumale and the comte de Chaligny among many ligueur notables of the city. Mayenne swore his oath to the ligue in front of the assembly, and shortly thereafter a Conseil générale de la Sainte Union was established under his direction. The following day, the nobles who had been with Mayenne were inducted as members of this new sovereign authority. The following month on 13 March, Mayenne was elevated to the position of 'lieutenant-general' of the kingdom by the ligue, giving him overall authority until such time as they had a king. This displeased Nemours, who had ambitions to lead the ligue of his own, and received encouragement in this from his mother Anne d'Este.

=== Ligueur governor ===
The city of Lyon rose up on 23 February in a violent reaction to news of the assassination of the duke, declaring itself for the ligueur cause. The city was greatly sympathetic towards the ligue due to their hatred of the royal commander in the region the seigneur de La Valette, brother to the royal favourite the duke of Épernon. Nemours arrived in the city on 22 March to cries of 'Long live the Catholic prince' from the ligueur population. Soon thereafter he attended a Te Deum at the cathédrale Saint-Jean and took over the post of lieutenant-general in addition to that of governor of the Lyonnais. Ligue control of the city would be contested between the various poles of ligueur authority, Nemours, the archbishop of Lyon and the urban elite of the city.

To assist in his administration of the Lyonnais in the ligues war with the crown, Nemours established a conseil de guerre for the province. This was largely dominated by his personal clients, but afforded the town council of Lyon the right to elect two members. He would rarely visit Lyon in the coming years, and as such left his brother Saint-Sorlin as his lieutenant in the city to manage relations with the ligueur council of the city while he conducted rural operations. Saint-Sorlin, only 16 years old when placed into the authority, proved weak and ineffective, and thus the archbishop of Lyon provided the cities leadership in practice.

The ligueur council in Lyon was also manipulated by Nemours, with the grandee installing two loyal nobles from each of the three components of his governate on the council (Lyonnais, Forez, Beaujolais). This was not enough however to command a majority, allowing the archbishop to take the lead on the council.

The Italian bankers of the city, much despised by the ligueur partisans were pushed from Lyon. with only around 6 families remaining by 1589. The merchants of the city, who had previously taken out loans from these Italian bankers tried to have relief for their debts granted by the ligue leadership as represented by the lieutenant-general Mayenne and Nemours. To this end they argued at the town council to the great nobles that the loans were a product of the 'tyrannical' Henri III and his 'bloodsucker' administration. The Italians continued to depart, and by 1592 only one family, the Capponi, remained.

Relations between the urban ligueurs and Nemours would not long survive their initial honeymoon period. In 1591, Nemours sought to gain advantage in his influence over the city through an appeal to the general xenophobia of the ligue towards Italians. To this end he ordered that the property of François Fortis, originally of Florentine extraction, be seized. During the seizure of the property Fortis was killed by the guards who came to repossess it. The ligue had however appointed Fortis the militia captain for the quarter of Saint-Vincent. Therefore, the council complained to Nemours about his arbitrary treatment of Fortis. Nemours protested, that Fortis was not a Frenchman and was a Florentine. The council retorted that regardless, it was not Nemours place to conduct violent actions against residents of the city, and that Fortis had great affection for Lyon.

=== Fight for the crown ===
Henri was put into a desperate position by the assassination of the duke, with much of the country rising up against him. To this end he entered compact with his former heir, the Protestant Navarre, uniting their forces against the ligue in April. Shortly after establishing this concord, Henri reached out to Mayenne with a proposal for his submission. The Lorraine's would be preserved in their governorships, and Nemours was to be offered maintenance of his control over Lyon with a pension of 10,000 écus added as a sweetener. This proposal was however unacceptable to the ligueurs. Nemours meanwhile left Lyon and moved north, taking Mâcon for the ligue on his path north. Arriving near the capital he fought in the indecisive battles with the royalists in the summer of 1589. The alliance of Henri and Navarre would last until Henri's assassination on 2 August 1589 at which point Navarre ascended as the royalist candidate for king, as Henri IV. The assassination damaged the royalist position, and Henri retreated from the capital, which the two kings had been besieging, into Normandie.

== Reign of Henri IV ==
=== Arques ===
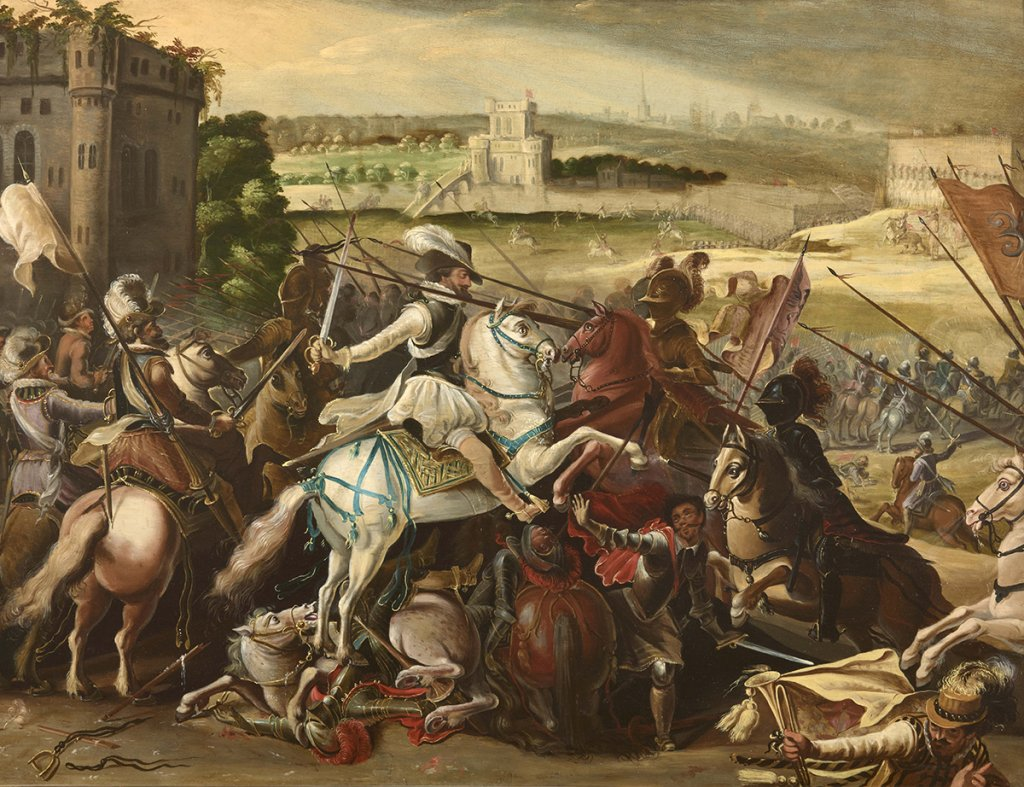
Henri IV leading the royalist charge during the Battle of Arques

Mayenne led the ligue army in pursuit, aiming to drive Henri into the sea, and the two sides met first at the Battle of Arques, where Henri triumphed, and it was reported that Nemours was wounded. On the first day of the combat, Mayenne had charged Nemours with control of half of the army to conduct an assault on the royal camp while Mayenne assaulted a suburb of Dieppe, however Mayenne faced stern opposition from Châtillon in this effort and decided to reunify the army under his personal command. After the defeat at Arques, Nemours was charged with racing back to Paris with an advanced guard of cavalry to see to the cities defences against any advance from the king, a task in which he was successful, leading to Henri's approach to the city being only brief before pulling back. The two sides met again at the Battle of Ivry on 14 March 1590.

=== Ivry ===
Nemours led Mayenne's cavalry on the ligueur right, facing off against the royalist cavalry under the command of Marshal Aumont and the duke of Montpensier. The battle began after an ineffective artillery duel, with a series of engagements along the line. Nemours mauled the forces under Montpensier however this could not make up for the victory of Henri himself in the centre, who bested the forces under Mayenne and sent them fleeing. Henri was left in control of the field.

=== Paris ===
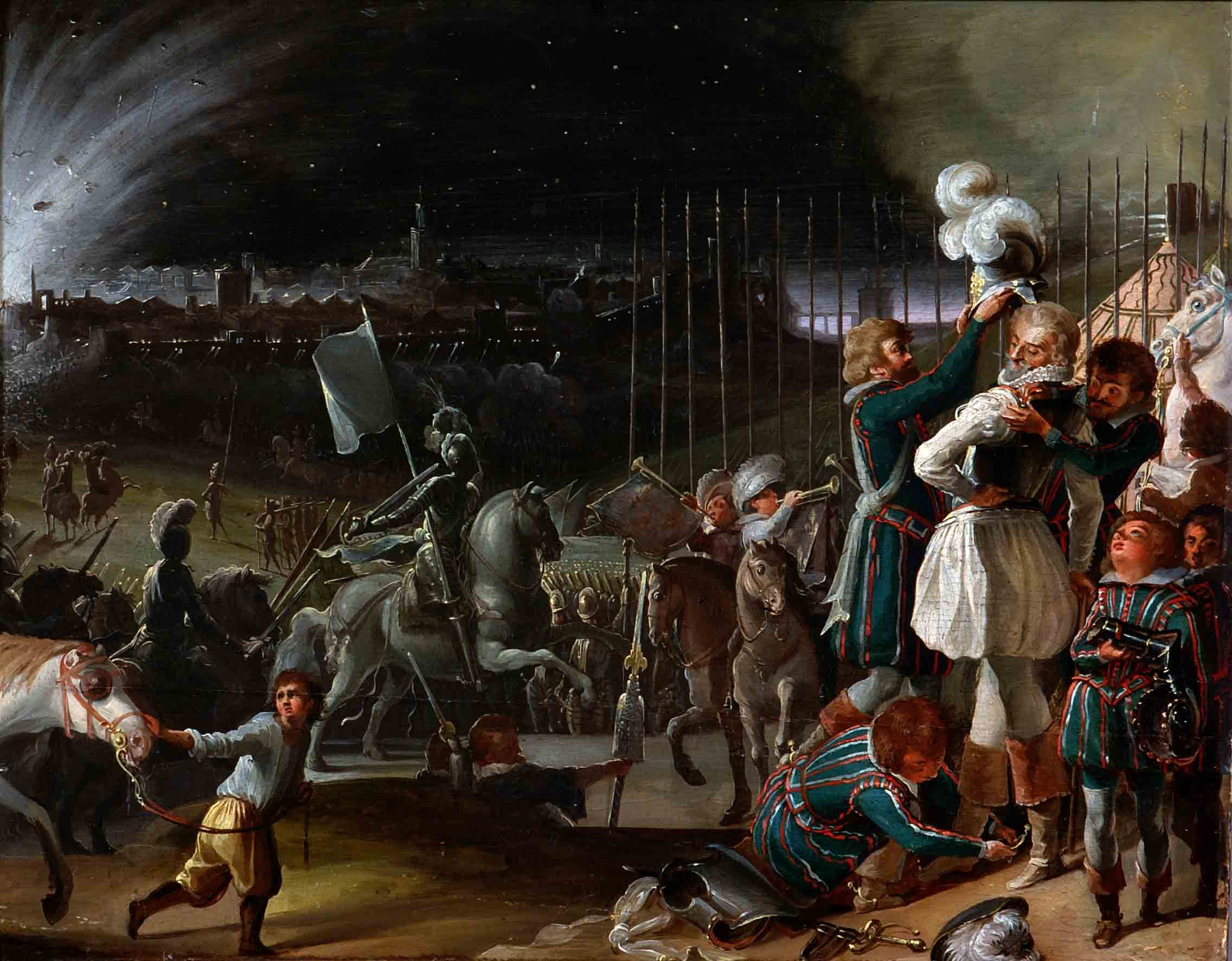
Henri IV at the unsuccessful siege of Paris, where Nemours led the defence of the city

Henri looked to convert his victory at Ivry to a decisive defeat of the ligue in France, and moved back to Paris for a new siege which began in earnest in May. Nemours who had retreated into the city after Ivry was joined by the chevalier d'Aumale one of the late duke of Guise's junior cousins. The two men led the cities defences in alliance with the ligueur government, known as the Seize. On 31 May the two joined a large procession to conduct the relics of Saint-Denis to Notre-Dame. Arriving in the cathedral the men and the other notables present swore at the altar that they would devote their lives to preserving the Catholic religion in Paris, and would die before serving Henri IV. In July Henri secured Saint-Denis and the faubourgs on the left bank of the river, causing a panic in the city proper. Protestors who wanted to yield to Henri broke into the palais de justice demanding peace and bread. The royalist protestors were however easily swept up by Nemours who organised arrests, hangings and ransoms in response, breaking the movement. He was less keen than many ligueurs in the city to institute bloody reprisals however. Paris would however be saved from without, by the arrival of an army under the duke of Parma, who forced Henri to retreat from the city in September.

In April 1591 Nemours returned back down south to Lyon, hardened by his experience of campaigning in the north. He was determined to impose himself on his governate. Importing luxury furniture and expanding his residence he was determined to carve out a place for himself in the manner of a prince. He developed his network in the city, in opposition to the Mayenniste party embodied by the archbishop of Lyon's affinity.

Nemours' relations with the 'lieutenant general' of the ligue, Mayenne were frosty. Mayenne showed himself hostile to the authority of Nemours over the Lyonnais. In response, Nemours interfered inside Mayenne's governorship of Bourgogne. In usurpation of Mayenne's authority, Nemours ordered the arrest of the baron de Sennecy, Mayenne's lieutenant-general for the region, due to his perceived caution. It was suspected that he desired to rebuild the Château of the city, which had been destroyed in 1585 in case it became necessary to come to blows with Mayenne.

Mayenne attempted further negotiations with Henri during March 1592. He insisted that his governorship of Bourgogne be a hereditary guarantee, something the king could not countenance, a host of other demands, among which was the provision of the governorship of the Lyonnais to him as an expansion of the governate of Bourgogne. Nemours who would lose his territory would be granted some indeterminate compensation. These negotiations did not progress anywhere.

=== Vienne ===
In the campaign season of 1592, Nemours attacked into Dauphiné against the Protestant commander Lesdiguières and succeeded in containing the commander, causing him to cease interventions into Provence. Lesdiguères had been aiming to combat the intervention of the duke of Savoie who sought to carve out French territory for himself. Nemours was happy to support his kinsmen in this enterprise. He achieved the further goal of securing for himself the city of Vienne in Dauphiné that year, further weakening the royal position in the province.

=== Estates General of 1593 ===
At the ligueur Estates General of 1593, called to elect a new ligueur king in opposition to Henri IV many candidates for the title were present. Among them were Mayenne, the young duke of Guise, the duke of Savoie, the duke of Lorraine and Nemours, who was a cadet of the sovereign Savoyard dukes. The Spanish in attendance pushed hard for the candidacy of the Isabella Clara Eugenia, daughter of Felipe II and Elisabeth of Valois, initially proposing marrying her to the Erzherzog von Österreich. Receiving strong resistance to this, they conceded to marrying her to a French prince, which left the candidacy of the unmarried Nemours and duke of Guise open. The Estates would be thrown into chaos when Henri announced his conversion to Catholicism, and be unable to reach any consensus as to who to elect in opposition, breaking up with little accomplished.

Ideologically flexible if it secured his families interests, he was open to becoming a royalist in return for his receipt of the governate of the Lyonnais, and Saint-Sorlin's receipt of that of Dauphiné. However this was too much for Henri.

=== Coup and counter coup ===
During 1593 Nemours made an unsuccessful attempt to replicate what Mayenne had achieved in Rouen by having the ligueur council absorbed into his advisory council. The ligueur council, which had always found him an absent and overbearing governor, chafed under the tax burden his military adventures created for Lyon, and in July 1593 executed a coup d'état, with the six representatives appointed by Nemours expelled from the council. Nemours arrived for a showdown with the rebellious council in September of that year and was promptly detained on 21 September and imprisoned in the citadel of Pierre-Scize. The council, which no longer styled itself as ligueur but rather a consulate council justified their actions in print as a response to his attempts to rule the council through 'two or three persons who were slaves of his passions'. According to pamphleteers the only politics he understood was that of The Prince and he continually extorted the people. In revenge for the imprisonment of his brother, Saint-Sorlin, who had been campaigning, unleashed his troops on the countryside around Lyon.

With Nemours influence over the Lyon council expunged, it would continue to convene under the leadership of the archbishop of Lyon until February 1594, when the town made its submission to the king's representative Marshal Ornano. Pomponne de Bellièvre, who took charge of the city began marshalling its resources towards fighting ligueurs.

Bellièvre conducted negotiations with the captive Nemours, necessary as his brother Saint-Sorlin held the city of Vienne and several smaller places around Lyon. Nemours held out from assisting Bellièvre, hopeful that he still had supporters in Lyon, and allied foreign armies in the area. Saint-Sorlin also resisted negotiations. Bellièvre reported to the king on the hopeless situation on 22 July. Nemours escaped from captivity 3 days later, disguised as a valet.

=== Second escape and death ===
Having escaped imprisonment for the second time in five years, he took charge of a ligueur army around the south-eastern frontier of the kingdom, with troops afforded to him by the duke of Savoy. Their presence was considered a great threat by Henri, who appointed the recently submitted duke of Guise as governor of Provence, hoping that he could combat the rebel presence in the region. In a further effort to combat him, in early 1595 Constable Montmorency invaded Dauphiné in the hopes of vanquishing him.

He would not gain any final showdown with the royalists however, retreating into Savoyard territory after the royalist victory of Fontaine-Française. He died not long thereafter at the Château d'Annecy on 13 August 1595 of a fever. His brother Saint-Sorlin became the duke of Nemours, and shortly thereafter laid down him arms and joined the royalist camp in return for 660,000 livres and immunity from any prosecutions. Meanwhile La Guiche became the governor of the Lyonnais.

== Sources ==
- Babelon, Jean-Pierre (2009). Henri IV. Fayard.
- Carroll, Stuart (2011). Martyrs and Murderers: The Guise Family and the Making of Europe. Oxford University Press.
- Cloulas, Ivan (1979). Catherine de Médicis. Fayard.
- Constant, Jean-Marie (1984). Les Guise. Hachette.
- Constant, Jean-Marie (1996). La Ligue. Fayard.
- Harding, Robert (1978). Anatomy of a Power Elite: the Provincial Governors in Early Modern France. Yale University Press.
- Heller, Henry (2003). Anti-Italianism in Sixteenth Century France. University of Toronto Press.
- Jouanna, Arlette (1998). Histoire et Dictionnaire des Guerres de Religion. Bouquins.
- Knecht, Robert (2010). The French Wars of Religion, 1559-1598. Routledge.
- Knecht, Robert (2016). Hero or Tyrant? Henry III, King of France, 1574-1589. Routledge.
- Pitts, Vincent (2012). Henri IV of France: His Reign and Age. Johns Hopkins University Press.
- Le Roux, Nicolas (2000). La Faveur du Roi: Mignons et Courtisans au Temps des Derniers Valois. Champ Vallon.
- Le Roux, Nicolas (2006). Un Régicide au nom de Dieu: L'Assassinat d'Henri III. Gallimard.
- Salmon, J.H.M (1979). Society in Crisis: France during the Sixteenth Century. Metheun & Co.
- Sauzet, Robert (1992). Henri III et Son Temps. Librarie Philosophique J. Vrin.
- Sutherland, Nicola (1980). The Huguenot Struggle for Recognition. Yale University Press.

Preceded by Jacques de Savoie	Duke of Nemours; 1585–1595	Succeeded by Henri de Savoie
