= Jacques de Savoie, Duke of Nemours =

French military commander, governor and Prince Étranger

Jacques de Savoie
- Duke of Nemours
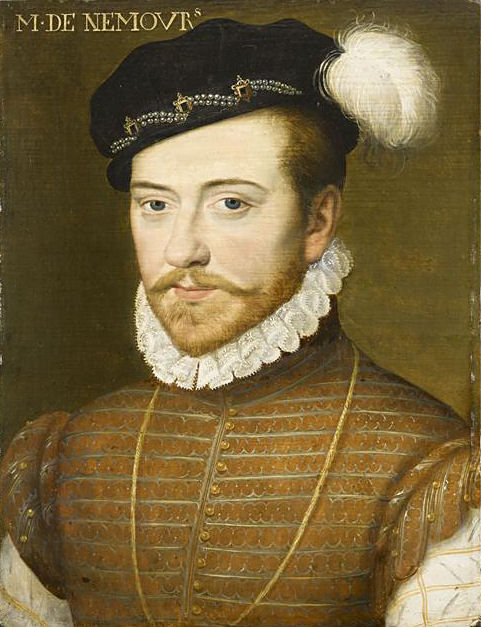
- Portrait by the Workshop of François Clouet, 1566
- Born: 12 October 1531; Vauluisant
- Died: 18 June 1585 (aged 53); Annecy
- Noble family: House of Savoy
- Spouses: Anna d'Este (m. 1566–85; his death)
- Issue: Charles Emmanuel, Duke of Nemours; Henri I, Duke of Nemours
- Father: Philippe, Duke of Nemours
- Mother: Charlotte d'Orléans

Jacques de Savoie, duc de Nemours (12 October 1531 – 15 June 1585) was a French military commander, governor and Prince Étranger. Having inherited his titles at a young age, Nemours fought for king Henri II during the latter Italian Wars, seeing action at the siege of Metz and the stunning victories of Renty and Calais in 1554 and 1558. Already a commander of French infantry, he received promotion to commander of the light cavalry after the capture of Calais in 1558. A year prior he had accompanied François, Duke of Guise on his entry into Italy, as much for the purpose of campaigning as to escape the king's cousin Antoine of Navarre who was threatening to kill him for his extra-marital pursuit of Navarre's cousin.

In 1559 Henri II died during a joust, and was succeeded by his young son François II. The new administration, led by the Guise due to François' young age was plagued with religious and financial difficulties, that emboldened a conspiracy to form against it. Nemours played a key role in crushing the Conspiracy of Amboise, capturing several of the leaders, and infamously promising the baron de Castelnau that if he surrendered no harm would come to him, the baron shortly thereafter being executed despite the pleas of many nobles.

The following year he involved himself in a conspiracy to spirit away the 10-year-old Anjou from court, so that he could be 'raised in Catholic environs'. The plot was uncovered, and facing arrest, Nemours fled from court. The case against him collapsed, however, as the only evidence was the word of the young prince. Around this time a case was also looming against him for his relationship indiscretions. Françoise de Rohan being distraught that he had given her a child without fulfilling his promise to marry her, the case would gestate for the next four years until the archbishop of Lyon ruled in his favour in 1565, allowing him to marry the widowed Anne d'Este the following year. Nemours fought during the first war of religion, fighting the baron des Adrets around Lyon and the Dauphiné. With the death of the Marshal Saint-André on the field of Dreux in December, he became the governor of the Lyonnais, an office he would hold for the next nine years before resigning it in favour of his lieutenant-general François de Mandelot.

Nemours remained close with the Guise, supporting them in their feud with the Montmorency over the assassination of the duke of Guise without notable results. Nemours was with the court during the Surprise of Meaux and successfully counselled the court to make a flight to Paris. While besieged in Paris the following month, he aided in breaking the ring the Protestants had set up around the city before Anne de Montmorency's victory at the battle of Saint Denis. With Montmorency's death on the field, the young prince, whom Nemours had once tried to lure away from court, Anjou, became lieutenant-general of the army. To support him in the practicalities of conducting the campaign Nemours was among those chosen as his advisers. During the third war of religion, Nemours was tasked with assisting Claude, Duke of Aumale, the late duke of Guise's brother in blocking an entry into France by a German mercenary force in favour of the Protestant army. Aumale and Nemours found themselves too consumed in bickering to effectively block the force, and it linked up with the main Protestant body.

By the 1570s Nemours moved away from active politics and military command. Having resigned his governorship, he devoted himself more fully to matters of the arts. Though he was suspected of involvement in the Ligues after 1576, the king was satisfied with his swearing that he did not desire the overturn of the Peace of Monsieur. In 1585, he died, and was succeeded as duke of Nemours by his son.

== Early life and family ==
Nemours, born in 1531, was the son of Philippe, Duke of Nemours, the first holder of the title and Charlotte d'Orléans, and became Duke of Nemours on his father's death in 1533.

As early as 1555 Nemours was courting Françoise de Rohan, and had given her the impression he was seeking marriage. Even now however, he was also showing interest in the duke of Guise's wife, causing much scandal at court. By 1556 Françoise had become pregnant, and tearfully pleaded with Nemours to go through with his promise of marrying her but he refused. The Guise, who wished to remain close with Nemours despite his indiscretions, promised him that he could marry Lucrezia d'Este instead. Upon the death of her husband Anne d'Este was left widowed. In 1565 she was ready to marry again, and married Nemours at Saint-Maur-des-Fosses in May 1566. The king provided the majority of the dowry to secure the marriage. Nemours looked to the church to handle the situation with Françoise due to his promise to marry her. He was able to void this arrangement, to proceed with his planned marriage of Anne, much to the fury of the Rohan and Catherine de Medici. The daughter of Duke Ercole II of Ferrara and Renée of France, Anne brought with her to the marriage the county of Gisors, a title she would continue to hold until her own death in 1607.

Together they had the following issue:

- Charles Emmanuel (1567–1595)
- Marguerite (1569–1572)
- Henry I (1572–1632)
- Emmanuel Philibert

Back in 1561 Nemours' scandalous behaviour regarding Françoise had been the subject of litigation as she attempted to sue Nemours into marrying her, having made her pregnant. Supporting her was her cousin Jeanne d'Albret, and Antoine of Navarre, though he withdrew his support that year. Back in 1557 he had sworn to kill Nemours and all his friends for the duke's behaviour. In 1566 the Archbishop of Lyon ruled against Françoise, and the court endorsed the ruling. Albret was furious, challenging the competence of all the members of the council that she could to rule on the case. She urged the Parlement of Paris to have jurisdiction over the case, however they refused as legally it had been sequestered from them to the attention of the king's council.

In 1571, 5 years after the marriage of Nemours and d'Este, the Pope endorsed the decision of the archbishop of Lyon, leading Françoise to formally convert to Protestantism.

The child of this illegitimate pregnancy was Henri de Savoie, comte de Genevois.

== Reign of Henri II ==
=== Italian wars ===
Nemours fought in the recently resumed Italian Wars in 1552, fighting at the spectacular victory of the defence of Metz and the siege of Lens where he distinguished himself. In the following years he fought at the shocking French victory of the Battle of Renty in 1554 and then in Piedmont the following year.

In late 1556, the French invaded Italy in support of the Pope. Nemours travelled with the expedition as commander of the infantry. Alongside the usual benefits of campaign it afforded him some distance from Navarre, who wanted him dead. The campaign would achieve little of note, becoming mired in the intrigues of Italian politics.

With François, Duke of Guise's remarkable capture of Calais, the king was in the mood to hand out favours to those who had participated in the victory. Claude, Duke of Aumale was made governor of Piedmont, leaving his post at the head of the light cavalry vacant. Nemours was thus granted the privilege of commander of the light cavalry in Aumale's stead.

=== Peace ===
To celebrate the end of the Italian Wars with the peace of Cateau-Cambrésis it was decided to host a joust. Henri, always a lover of martial sports, decided to participate. Also participating were François I, Duke of Nevers, Guise and Nemours. Nemours and Guise both rode against the king, Henri getting the better of his nobles in both engagements. It would be at this event that during a joust against Montgommery, the captain of his Scots Guard, Henri would be killed as a splinter of his opponent's lance embedded itself in his head.

== Reign of François II ==
The new Guise-led administration that formed for the young François II of France was faced with a kingdom in financial and religious crisis. Opposition on both of these impetuses coalesced into the Conspiracy of Amboise where an array of nobles sought to seize the king and kill his advisers. The Guise became aware of this conspiracy, and prepared to respond militarily on its launch. Nemours, fresh off the capture of Mazères and Raunay, was tasked with reducing a château held by the baron de Castelnau, one of the ringleaders. His forces surrounded the château du Noizay but decided it would be more advantageous to reduce the fortified residence through negotiation. In an interview with the baron he was able to convince him to come peacefully, in return for a promise 'on his honour' that neither Castelnau or his followers would be executed. The administration would not however honour this promise Nemours made, either due to disinterest or due to him not mentioning it to the court. As such despite the protestations of many Catholic nobles, including Anne d'Este a man of 'good birth' would be put to death.

== Reign of Charles IX ==
Ousted from government by the death of the young king in December 1560, the Guise retreated from court, conscious that they were unlikely to receive much office or favours under the new formal regency for Charles IX. Accompanying them on their departure in January were Nemours and Longueville.

=== Conspiracy ===
To many Catholics the environment in which the young princes were being raised appeared far too Protestant. To this end a plot was devised to spirit the young Anjou away from court so that he could be raised in properly Catholic environs such as Savoy. Nemours was implicated as a leader in this attempted conspiracy. To encourage the young prince away from the court, Nemours had enlisted the young Henri de Guise, to draw his playmate away. Having gained awareness of the plot, Catherine questioned her child as to who had tried to persuade him to leave court; the 10-year-old implicated Nemours on 29 October. Shortly thereafter Catherine ordered Nemours' arrest, and he fled court. However as she began to pursue a case against them, it became apparent that the only testimony in support would be from a 10-year-old child; as such the case against Nemours was dropped shortly thereafter and he was given permission to return to court.

With the departure of the Guise and their allies from the court for the second time in October 1561, Nemours was among those who joined them on their exodus. The motive for the departure was not purely religious but also factional, with Longueville, a long-time associate of the Guise, departing also, despite his Protestantism. In total their retinue numbered 700 horse, a large section of the nobility gathered at court. Their departure, alongside that of Anne de Montmorency left the regency government of Catherine de Medici with a precariously thin base of support, propped up only by the Bourbon-Vendôme and the Châtillon.

=== First war of religion ===
During the first civil war, Nemours attempted to reduce the city of Lyon which had risen up in support of the prince of Condé. He fought with the baron des Adrets in Dauphiné, and in December was in the process of negotiating a favourable truce with the infamous commander which would have seen him secure the defection of the rebel army. However, Adrets' subordinates learned of the negotiations and had him arrested. In the major field battle of the war at Dreux, the governor of the Lyonnais, Beaujolais and Forez, Marshal Saint-André was murdered on the field after having surrendered. This left a vacancy for his governate, which was to be filled by Nemours.

In the wake of the Edict of Amboise which brought the first civil war to a close with the provision of limited toleration to Protestants the crown desired to reconcile the factions to ensure internal peace. To this end they courted Condé, hoping to foster his loyalty. Catherine de Medici informed Anne d'Este that she had successfully reconciled Condé with Nemours and Cardinal Guise, brother of the late duke.

=== Feud ===
During the final siege of the first war of religion, the duke of Guise had been assassinated. The family blamed Gaspard II de Coligny for ordering the hit and were determined to pursue 'justice' against the Admiral. Coligny for his part came under the protection of his uncle Montmorency, who re-opened his rivalry with the Guise in defence of his nephew. In an attempt to gain the upper hand, the Guise arranged for a petition to court, from many leading nobles, arguing for the right to open a case against Coligny. Nemours was among the signatories, however the court proved uninterested, and formally suspended any investigation into the murder in early 1564.

=== Governor ===
As governor of the Lyonnais, Nemours was keen to patronise 'men of letters' and other centres of learning within his governate. As the crown increasingly loomed on the cusp of bankruptcy, the distribution of funds to its regional governors became more erratic and rare. By 1565 Nemours had accumulated 140,000 livres of debts for unpaid pensions and salaries during his tenure as governor. It was hoped by governors that these debts would be satisfied by the court when it had greater funds.

=== Second war of religion ===
Frustrated at their declining influence in court, and the increasingly restrictive direction royal policy was moving in regarding Protestantism, the leading Protestants again plotted a coup. Their aim was to seize the king while he was staying at Meaux, and to kill Charles, Cardinal of Lorraine. Their attempt was a failure and the king was able to retreat with the court to Paris after some debate. While Hôpital, the chancellor, had argued in favour of relying on the fortifications at Meaux, Nemours and Guise advocated a flight to Paris and convinced the court successfully. As they fled, they were pursued by the Protestant forces, who adapted their plan to a siege of Paris. To this end they began trying to invest the city, while Anne de Montmorency assembled an army inside for a breakout. While Montmorency was busy building an army, Nemours was among those commanders trying to relieve pressure on the city. On 7 November he successfully captured a river crossing that was vital to a successful siege of Paris. Several days later Montmorency was ready and broke out of the city, besting the Protestant army at Saint-Denis on 10 November. During the battle of Saint-Denis, Montmorency would be killed, leaving the office of Constable of France and role as chief of the crown's military vacant. The crown had little desire to see another powerful noble family control this critical post; as such, to replace him, the king's brother Anjou was selected to lead the crown's war effort. While closer to the family, Anjou was still a child, and as such to provide him military guidance, and to actually lead the army in the field, a selection of loyal nobles were chosen. Artus de Cossé-Brissac the recently promoted Marshal, the king's cousin Louis, Duke of Montpensier and Nemours were chosen for this important role, with Cossé in overall charge.

=== Third war of religion ===
At the outset of the third war of religion, the Protestants had consolidated their movement in the south west as opposed to fighting in the north as they had previously. Nevertheless the crown was conscious that Louis of Nassau was seeking to enter France with an army from the Spanish Netherlands; to this end Charles instructed Nemours to assemble an army for the defence of Paris, however Nassau was bested at the border. In early 1569, it became clear that the duke of Zweibrücken was intending to cross into France in support of the Protestant nobility that was gathered in the west. To this end the court, little desiring to see a conjunction between the two forces, assembled a second army. Aumale was tasked with leading the blocking force in Champagne, with forces from the Rhône valley under Nemours to support him in this effort. The two commanders did not get along, and their constant conflict enabled Zweibrücken to slip past them through the Franche-Comté and establish contact with the Protestants under Gaspard II de Coligny. The mutinous remains of their combined army linked with the main royal force under the king's brother Anjou at Limoges.

=== Withdrawal ===
By 1571, Nemours wished to resign his governorship of the Lyonnais. He chose to do so in favour of his lieutenant-general in the region, and former page François de Mandelot. This arrangement had been very unusual in the early 16th century, with the choice of governors defaulting to the crown on the resignation or death of a sitting governor; however by the 1560s it was becoming increasingly common. Mandelot would govern the Lyonnais until his death in 1588.

== Reign of Henri III ==
=== Malcontents ===
By 1575 Protestants were no longer the only ones in rebellion, as the Malcontent movement swept up many politiques who wished for religious compromise to secure stability in the kingdom. Nevers warned the king's younger brother Alençon, not to take the opportunity presented, saying that those who rebelled against the authority of the king did not triumph. Yet Alençon saw this movement as conducive to his own power, and aligned himself with the Malcontents, releasing a manifesto in which he denounced the influence of 'foreigners' and calling for their exclusion from the estates general. By this term he referred to the Guise, who were from Lorraine, and the duke of Nevers and Nemours, both of whom were of Italian descent. While Alençon would succeed in securing favourable terms for himself in the Peace of Monsieur, Nemours and Nevers would remain active in court life.

=== Ligue ===
In response to the generous Peace of Monsieur which brought the fifth war of religion to a close, militant Catholics reacted with fury. Many across France began forming religious leagues, the most popular model of which was that created by Jacques d'Humières in Peronne which began to spread across France. Henri suspected the involvement of Henri, Duke of Guise, Charles, Duke of Mayenne and Nemours as ringleaders of this ligue and made them all swear oaths to abide by the terms of the peace of Monsieur. Frustrated at his continued inability to contain the movement, he declared himself to be at its head, and was compelled by the Estates General of 1576 to void the peace and make war on the Protestants again.

Having primarily devoted his final years to letters and art, he died at Annecy in 1585.

== Ancestry ==
Ancestors of Jacques de Savoie, Duke of Nemours

16. Antipope Felix V
8. Louis, Duke of Savoy (= 26)
17. Mary of Burgundy
4. Philip II, Duke of Savoy
18. Janus of Cyprus
9. Anne of Cyprus (= 27)
19. Charlotte of Bourbon
2. Philip, Duke of Nemours
20. Jean I de Brosse, Lord of Boussac
10. Jean II de Brosse, Lord of Boussac
21. Jeanne de Naillac, Lady of Motte-Jolivet
5. Claudine de Brosse
22. Charles de Châtillon, Lord of Avaugour
11. Nicole de Châtillon, Countess of Penthièvre
23. Isabeau de Vivonne, Lady of Thors
1. Jacques, Duke of Nemours
24. Jean de Dunois
12. François I, Duke of Longueville
25. Marie of Harcourt
6. Louis I, Duke of Longueville
26. Louis, Duke of Savoy (= 8)
13. Agnes of Savoy
27. Anne of Cyprus (= 9)
3. Charlotte of Orleans
28. Rudolf IV, Margrave of Hachberg-Sausenberg
14. Philip of Hachberg-Sausenberg
29. Margaret of Vienne
7. Johanna of Hachberg-Sausenberg
30. Amadeus IX, Duke of Savoy
15. Maria of Savoy
31. Yolande of Valois

== Sources ==
- Baird, Henry (1880). History of the Rise of the Huguenots: Vol 1 of 2. Hodder & Stoughton.
- Baird, Henry (1881). History of the Rise of the Huguenots: Vol 2 of 2. Hodder & Stoughton.
- Baumgartner, Frederic (1988). Henry II: King of France 1547-1559. Duke University Press.
- Carroll, Stuart (2005). Noble Power during the French Wars of Religion: The Guise Affinity and the Catholic Cause in Normandy. Cambridge University Press.
- Carroll, Stuart (2009). Martyrs and Murderers: The Guise Family and the Making of Europe. Oxford University Press.
- Harding, Robert (1978). Anatomy of a Power Elite: the Provincial Governors in Early Modern France. Yale University Press.
- Jouanna, Arlette (2007). The St Bartholomew's Day Massacre: The Mysteries of a Crime of State. Manchester University Press.
- Jouanna, Arlette (1998). Histoire et Dictionnaire des Guerres de Religion. Bouquins.
- Knecht, Robert (1998). Catherine de' Medici. Routledge.
- Knecht, Robert (2010). The French Wars of Religion, 1559-1598. Routledge.
- Knecht, Robert (2016). Hero or Tyrant? Henry III, King of France, 1574-1589. Routledge.
- Pitts, Vincent J. (2009). Henri IV of France: His Reign and Age. Johns Hopkins University Press.
- Roelker, Nancy (1968). Queen of Navarre: Jeanne d'Albret 1528-1572. Harvard University Press.
- Roelker, Nancy (1996). One King, One Faith: The Parlement of Paris and the Religious Reformation of the Sixteenth Century. University of California Press.
- Salmon, J.H.M (1975). Society in Crisis: France during the Sixteenth Century. Metheun & Co.
- Scott, Tom (2017). The Swiss and Their Neighbours, 1460-1560: Between Accommodation and Aggression. Oxford University Press.
- Shimizu, J. (1970). Conflict of Loyalties: Politics and Religion in the Career of Gaspard de Coligny, Admiral of France, 1519–1572. Geneva: Librairie Droz.
- Sutherland, Nicola (1980). The Huguenot Struggle for Recognition. Yale University Press.
- Thompson, James (1909). The Wars of Religion in France 1559-1576: The Huguenots, Catherine de Medici and Philip II. Chicago University Press.
- Vester, Matthew Allen (2008). Jacques de Savoie-Nemours l'apanage du Genevois au cœur de la puissance dynastique savoyarde au XVIe siècle (in French). Droz.
- Wood, James (2002). The King's Army: Warfare, Soldiers and Society during the Wars of Religion in France, 1562-1576. Cambridge University Press.

Preceded by Philippe de Savoie	Duke of Nemours; 1533–1585	Succeeded by Charles Emmanuel de Savoie
