= François de Mandelot =

- seigneur de Pacy
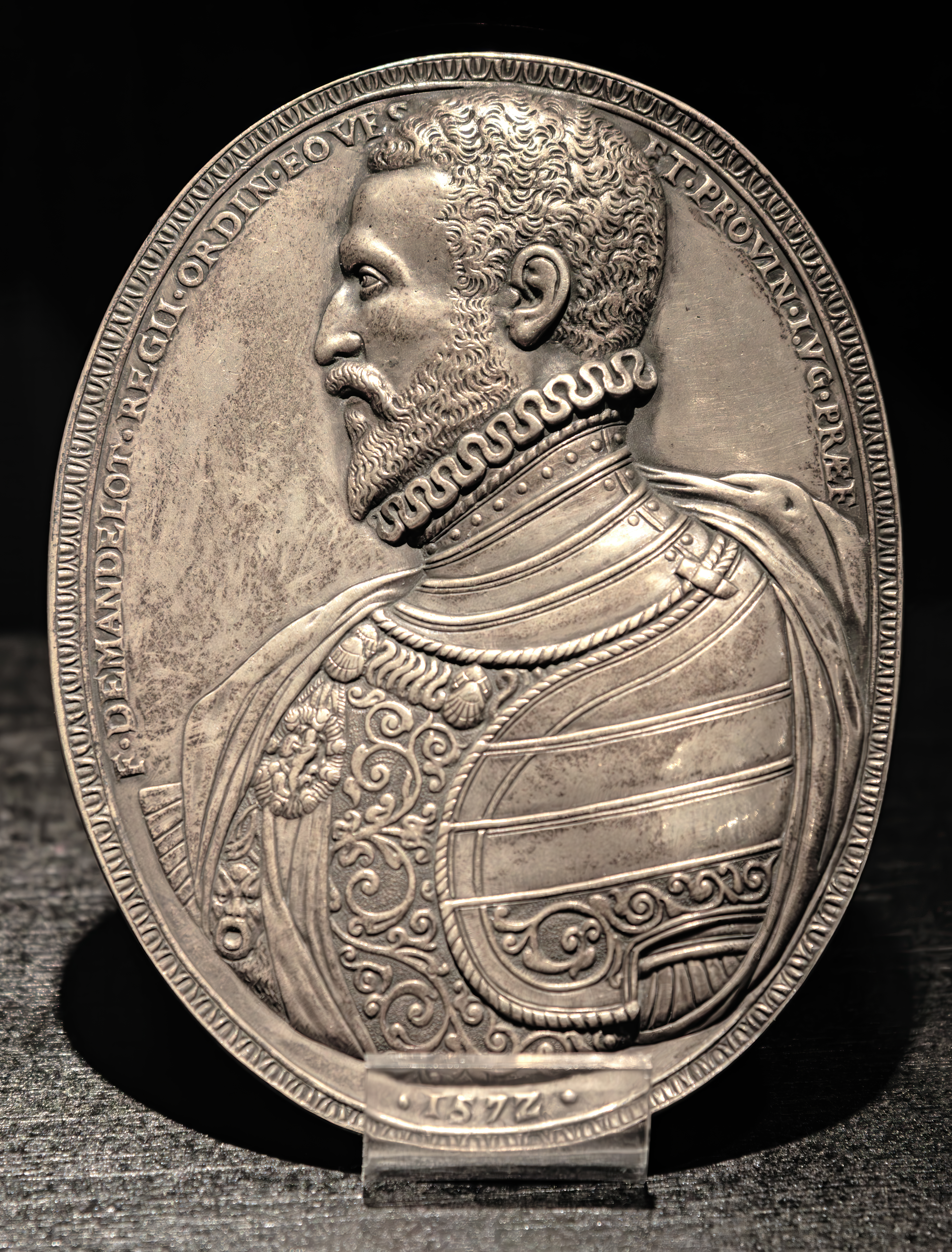
- Contemporary engraving of Mandelot
- Born: c. 1529
- Died: 11 November 1588

François de Mandelot, seigneur de Pacy (c. 1529-11 November 1588) was governor of the Lyonnais from 1571 to 1588 under Charles IX and Henri III. Raised in the household of the duke of Nemours as a page, he became the lieutenant of his patrons ordinance company. Having become the governor of the Lyonnais on the death of Saint-André in 1562, Nemours would subsequently appoint Mandelot as the lieutenant-general of the governate.

In 1571 Mandelot found himself further elevated, as Nemours resigned from the governorship in his favour, a practice that had been largely prohibited in the early sixteenth century. In this position Mandelot was thrust into a crisis as order collapsed in France in the wake of the Massacre of Saint Bartholomew. Mandelot was instructed by the king to arrest leading Protestants in the town, and to seize their estates. Mandelot complied after some deliberation, however by now Charles had countermanded his instructions. While Mandelot was busy in the suburbs dealing with a disturbance, a militant crowd broke into the prison and massacred the Protestants held there.

Under Henri III, Mandelot found himself in conflict with one of the kings mignons the duc d'Épernon who installed one of his clients in the citadel of Lyon after having purchased the office. Mandelot and the town council fought against the appointment and eventually succeeded in getting it overturned. Upon his death in 1588, Charles Emmanuel, Duke of Nemours succeeded him as governor of the Lyonnais.

== Reign of Charles IX ==
Prior to becoming a governor Mandelot was one of an increasing number of nobles who had fought a duel to resolve a private dispute.

In his capacity of lieutenant-general of the Lyonnais, Mandelot pursued the aim of creating a larger levy for the governate, raised a large forced loan from Lyon He used the revenues to expand the mercenary force living in the Lyonnais from 1000 men to 1500 in 1569.

=== Rise to governor ===
In 1571 Nemours who had been the governor of the Lyonnais since the death of Saint-André in 1562 decided to resign the office in favour of his former page Mandelot. Mandelot had served in Lyon in the years prior as Nemours' lieutenant-general for the Lyonnais, and further as a lieutenant in Nemours' ordinance company.

=== Massacre of Saint Bartholomew ===
Lyon first received news of the events unfolding in Paris on 27 August when word arrived of the attempt on Admiral Coligny's life. This was followed a few days later with news of the unfolding massacre. Seeking to get ahead of the situation Charles orally transmitted orders to Mandelot via the sieur de Peyrat instructing him to arrest all Protestants in Lyon, and seize their property. He would countermand the order in a letter sent several days subsequently, but not before Mandelot had gone through with the arrests. While Mandelot was engaged in combatting a disturbance in the suburbs on 30 August, a militant crowd broke into the prisons and massacred the Protestants of the city. The bodies of 700 Protestants of the town were thrown into the Rhône. The violence continued until 2 September when order was at last restored. The consulate of Lyon initially endorsed the massacre, however as the kings displeasure at the spread of the killings became apparent they retracted their endorsement by the end of September.

With word reaching court that the severed head of Gaspard II de Coligny was being sent to Rome, Charles IX wrote to Mandelot to that effect. Mandelot replied that an agent of the Guise had recently passed through the town, but that as he had not yet received the recent orders he had not stopped him, or enquired as to any trophies he may be carrying.

Though he did not endorse the massacre, offering a reward for those who handed in the perpetrators, Mandelot was not a friend to the Protestant community of Lyon. In collaboration with the commissioners sent to enforce the various peace edicts that brought the civil wars of the 1560s and 1570s to an end he sought to repress and reduce the size of the community.

=== Citadel of Lyon ===
As Henri III increasingly turned to a new generation of men as his favourites, one of them Jean Louis de Nogaret de La Valette decided to buy the office of governor of the citadel of Lyon from its occupant, installing one of his clients, Aimar de Poiseau in the role in 1584. Mandelot and the échevins of Lyon reacted with horror, writing to the king that it would allow its controller to surprise the town and betray the king simultaneously. After much campaigning they succeeded in removing Poiseau from the office.

=== Ligue and death ===
In his final years Mandelot complained bitterly that he had penured and indebted himself in his loyal service of the crown. Upon Mandelot's death, the Ligue, which was ascendant in the region, and had seized the capital, chose to replace him with Charles Emmanuel, Duke of Nemours.

== Sources ==
- Baird, Henry (1880). History of the Rise of the Huguenots: Vol 2 of 2. Hodder & Stoughton.
- Harding, Robert (1978). Anatomy of a Power Elite: the Provincial Governors in Early Modern France. Yale University Press.
- Jouanna, Arlette (2007). The St Bartholomew's Day Massacre: The Mysteries of a Crime of State. Manchester University Press.
- Jouanna, Arlette (1998). Histoire et Dictionnaire des Guerres de Religion. Bouquins.
- Mingous, Gautier (2020). "Forging Memory: The Aftermath of the Saint Bartholomew's Day Massacre in Lyon". French History. 34 (4).
- Salmon, J.H.M (1975). Society in Crisis: France during the Sixteenth Century. Metheun & Co.
