= Preuilly =

Preuilly may refer to the following places in France:

- Preuilly, Cher, a commune in the department of Cher
- Preuilly-sur-Claise, a commune in the department of Indre-et-Loire
- Preuilly-la-Ville, a commune in the department of Indre
- Preuilly Abbey, a former cistercian monastery in the department of Seine-et-Marne
