= Anna d'Este =

Figure during French wars of Religion

- Duchess of Nemours; Duchess of Guise
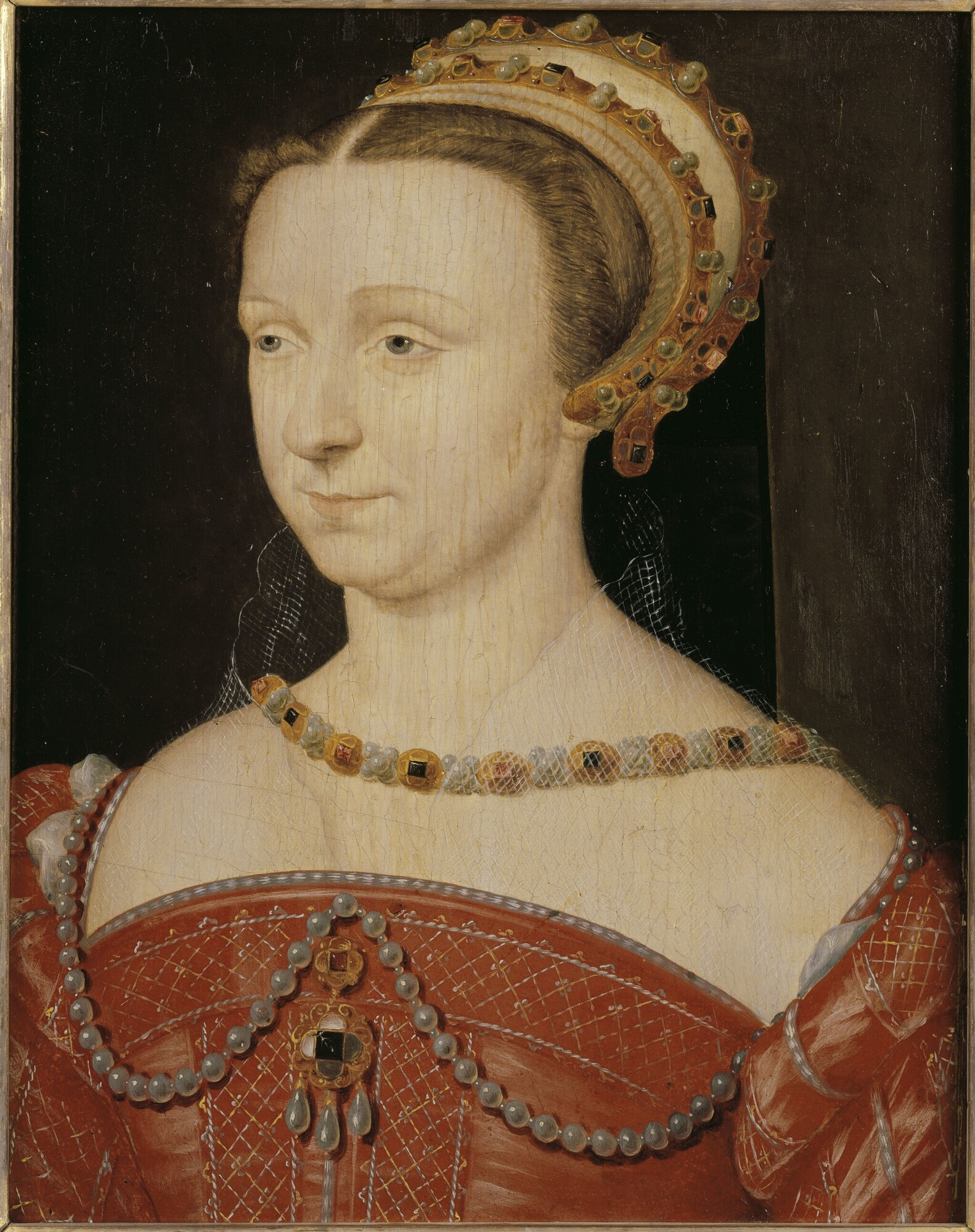
- Portrait by an unknown artist, 2nd half of the 16th century, oil on wood. Versailles, Musée du Château
- Born: 16 November 1531; Ferrara, Italy
- Died: 17 May 1607 (aged 75); Paris, France
- Spouse: Francis, Duke of Guise (m. 1548; died 1563) Jacques, Duke of Nemours (m. 1566; died 1585)
- Issue: Henry I, Duke of Guise; Catherine, Duchess of Montpensier; Charles, Duke of Mayenne; Louis II, Cardinal of Guise; Charles Emmanuel, Duke of Nemours; Henri I, Duke of Nemours
- House: Este
- Father: Ercole II d'Este
- Mother: Renée of France

Anna d'Este (16 November 1531 – 17 May 1607) was an important princess with considerable influence at the court of France and a central figure in the French Wars of Religion. In her first marriage, she was Duchess of Aumale, then of Guise, in her second marriage, Duchess of Nemours and Genevois.

== Life ==
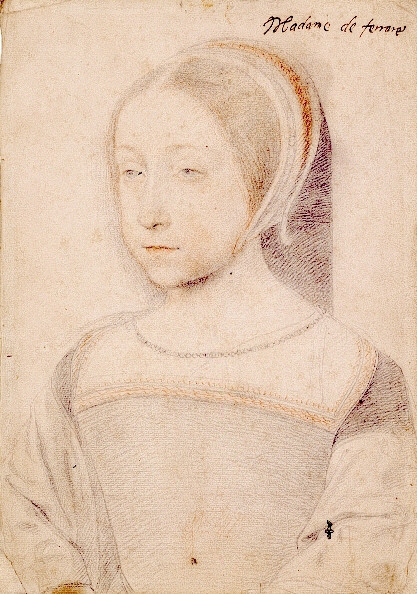
Renée of France, Anna d'Este's mother

Anna d'Este was born on 16 November 1531, the eldest daughter of the Duke of Ferrara Ercole II (son of Lucrezia Borgia and grandson of Pope Alexander VI) and his wife, Renée of France (daughter of King Louis XII of France). She grew up in Ferrara, where she received an excellent education. The future writer and scholar Olympia Fulvia Morata was chosen as one of her companions at court.

In 1548, after long and difficult negotiations, her marriage was arranged with the French prince François, duke of Aumale, son of Claude, Duke of Guise. The contract was signed in Ferrara on 28 September and the marriage was held in Saint-Germain-en-Laye near Paris on 16 December. The princess was never to return to Italy. Through her mother, Anna was the granddaughter of the French king Louis XII.

By her marriage she had become a member of the powerful Guise family, and because of her Italian roots she had especially close ties to the queen and later queen-mother, Catherine de' Medici. For these reasons, her position at court was outstanding. Duchess of Guise after the death of her father-in-law in 1550, she governed the family estates and the enormous fortunes of the Guise with the help of her mother-in-law, Antoinette de Bourbon. She was active on behalf of her father and acted as mediator between the courts of France and of Ferrara. She gave birth to seven children, four of whom reached adulthood.

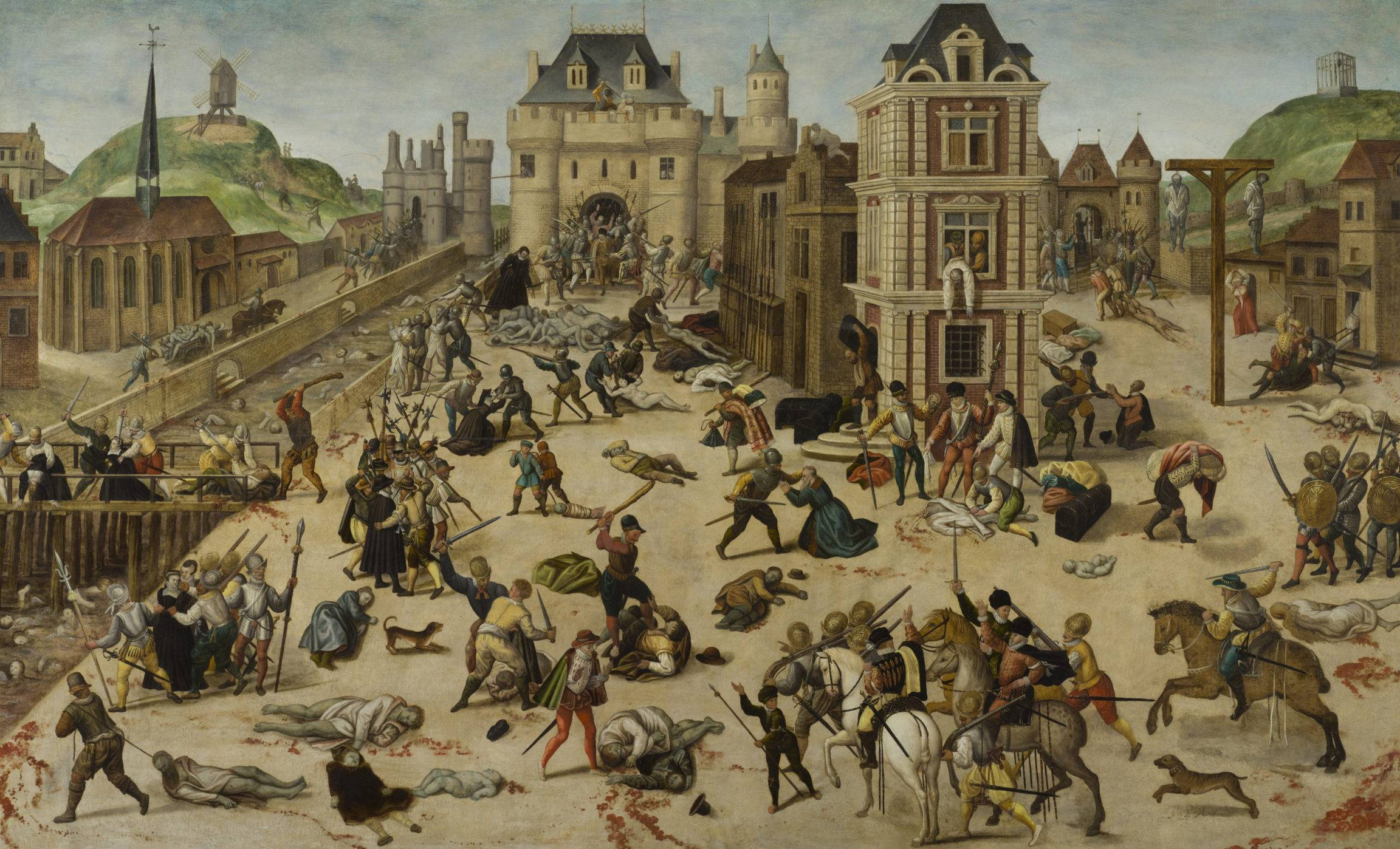
St. Bartholomew's Day massacre

In February 1563 François, Duke of Guise was shot by the Huguenot Jean de Poltrot de Méré and died of his wounds a few days later. While Poltrot was seized and swiftly executed, Anna took all possible steps to sue Gaspard de Coligny, the leader of the French Huguenots, whom she held responsible for her husband's assassination. During the next three years, the widow put pressure on the king and his courts of justice with her petitions, but in January 1566 the king's council declared Coligny innocent and imposed eternal silence in the matter. Many contemporaries believed Anna was responsible for the shooting of Coligny on 22 August 1572, which triggered the St. Bartholomew's Day massacre.

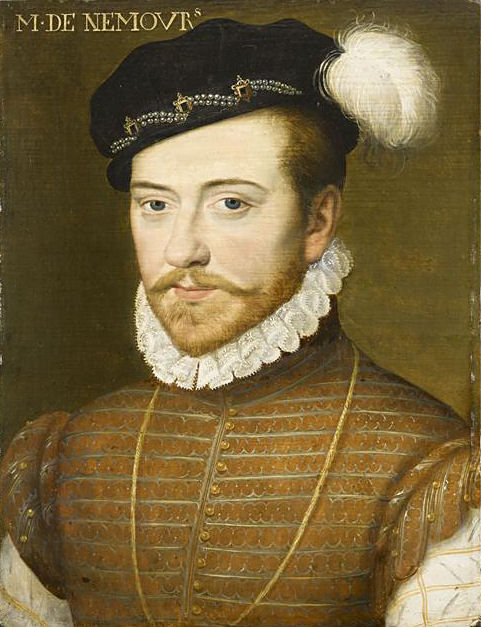
Jacques of Savoy, Anna's second husband

On 29 April 1566, Anna married Jacques, Duke of Nemours and Genevois. Henceforth, the princess spent most of her time in Annecy or on the road between her duchy of Genevois and the court of France. In politically difficult situations she acted as mediator between her husband and the Duke of Savoy, and in the meantime she held her position at the court of France. Anna promoted her sons' careers, she helped her clients to make their living, and she claimed a prominent place in official ceremonies at court. After the death of her second husband in 1585, Anna lived in Paris, in her Hôtel de Nemours, on the left bank of the Seine, in what is today Rue Séguier. With the formation of the Catholic League, in which her sons played a prominent part, her importance increased considerably.

In December 1588 Henry III ordered the imprisonment of Anna d'Este and had her sons Henri and Louis murdered. Anna was released from prison after the death of Henry III. During the siege of Paris by Henry IV, Anna was declared "queen-mother" by the League, but after the Bourbon's conversion back to Catholicism in 1593 she recognized him as king and tried to convince her rebellious sons to take the same step. In 1594 Anna traveled to Paris to pay homage to Henry IV.

Anna spent her last years in the highly respectable position of "superintendante de la maison" of the queen, Marie de' Medici, but also in growing indebtedness and in constant worry about the financial situation of her children and grandchildren. She died in Paris on May 17, 1607, aged 75.

== Death ==
When she died on 17 May 1607, the value of her movable goods came to little more than 4000 livres. The entrails and the heart of the Duchess were interred in Paris and in Joinville while her body was brought to Annecy, where it was buried next to her second husband. None of the tombs remain.

== Significance ==
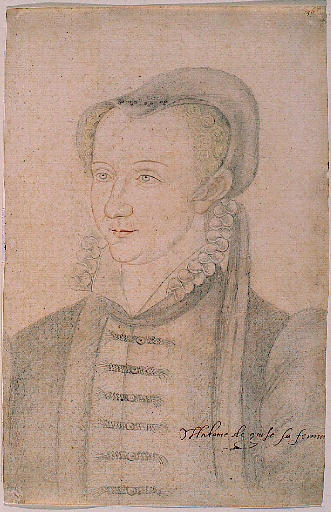
Portrait of Anna d'Este by an unknown artist, 2nd half of the 16th century, drawing. Fécamp, Musée des arts et de l'enfance, inventary nr. FEC 17.

With regard to the confessional disputes, Anna's life does not differ much from those of other princesses of her time. Her mother was a Calvinist, her father, husbands, and sons were more or less radical Catholics. She helped to increase the acceptance of Henry IV following his conversion to Catholicism. In other regards, she held a special position at the court of France, which can be seen from the numerous lawsuits she was involved in. Although the entanglement in legal proceedings even for minor causes was quite common for the French aristocracy of the early modern period, it was Anna and her mother who contested the king's right to Brittany, and in doing so they referred to their positions as daughter and granddaughter of a French king.

== Family ==
Henry, Duke of Guise, Anna's first-born son

Children from the marriage with François, Duke of Guise (1519–1563):

- Henry, prince of Joinville, then Duke of Guise (1550–1588)
- Catherine, Duchess of Montpensier (1551–1596), married Louis, Duke of Montpensier
- Charles, Marquis, then Duke of Mayenne (1554–1611)
- Louis, archbishop of Reims, then Cardinal of Guise (1555–1588)
- Antoine (1557–1560)
- François (1559–1573)
- Maximilien (1562–1567/68)

Children of the marriage with Jacques de Savoie (1531–1585):

- Charles Emmanuel, prince of Genevois, then Duke of Nemours (1567–1595)
- Marguerite (1569–1572)
- Henry I, Marquis of Saint-Sorlin, then Duke of Nemours (1572–1632)

== Sources ==
- Peebles, Kelly Digby; Scarlatta, Gabriella, eds. (2021). Representing the Life and Legacy of Renée de France: From Fille de France to Dowager Duchess. Palgrave Macmillan.
- Parker, Holt (2007). "Morata, Fulvia Olympia, (1526/1527–1555)". In Robin, Diana Maury; Larsen, Anne R.; Levin, Carole (eds.). Encyclopedia of women in the Renaissance: Italy, France, and England. ABC-CLIO, Inc.
