= Vauluisant Abbey =

Cistercian abbey founded in 1127

Coordinates: 48°15′55″N 3°32′10″E

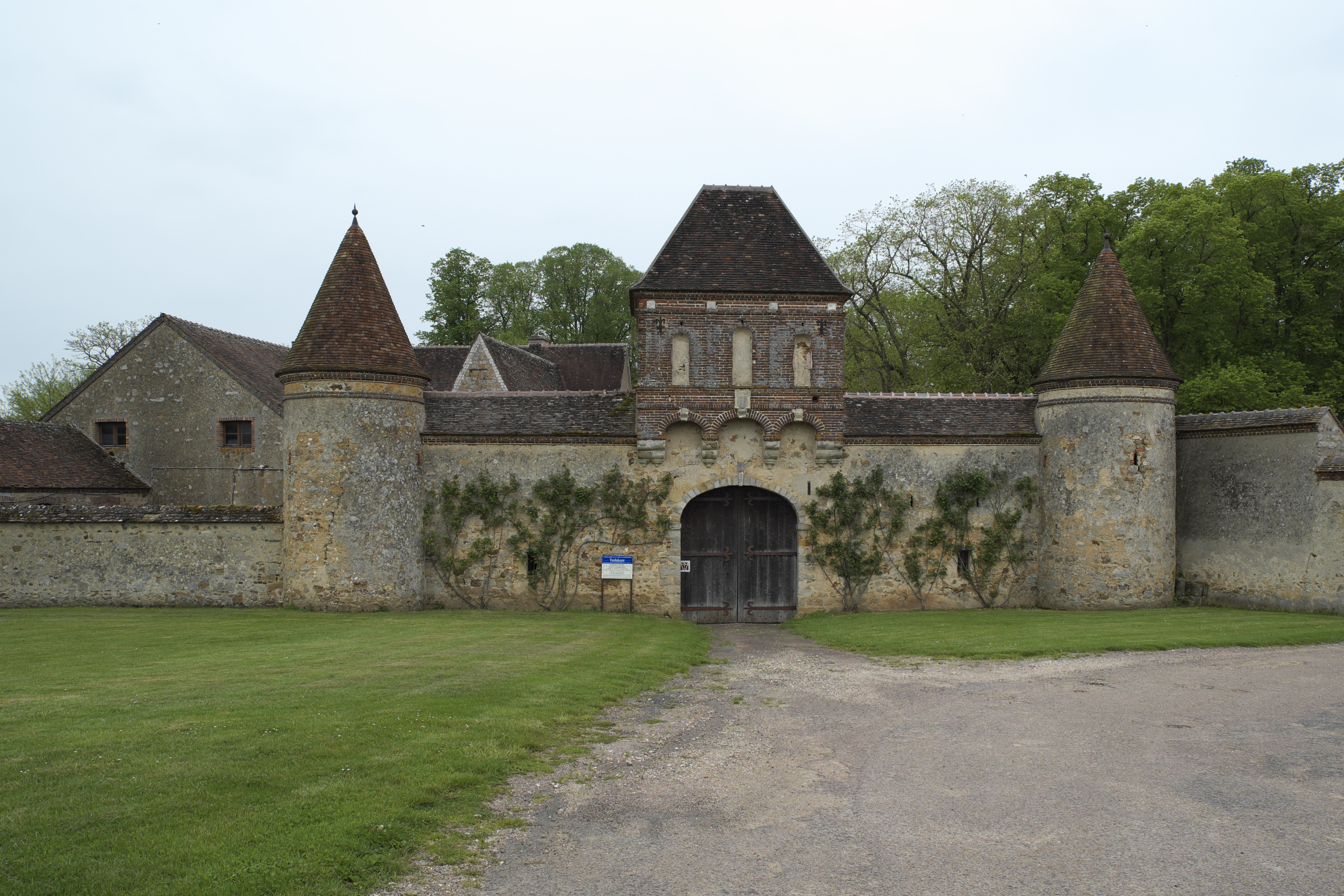
Abbey gate

Vauluisant Abbey, near Courgenay in the canton of Brienon-sur-Armançon, Yonne, France, is a Cistercian abbey founded in 1127 by a group of monks from Preuilly Abbey (Seine-et-Marne) who came to settle between the forest of Othe and the forest of Lancy, an area near the borders of Île-de-France, Champagne and Burgundy that had come to be far from human habitation. They diverted the waters of the little River Alain and by 1 April 1129, works were far enough advanced for Henri Sanglier, the archbishop of Sens, to consecrate the modest oratory. By 1140 Vauluisant was fully operational. The abbey church was consecrated in 1149. In the second half of the 12th century, granges were established to cultivate abbey lands far from the abbey itself, at Beauvais, Toucheboeuf, Livanne, Cérilly, Armentières, worked by lay brothers who lived communally. Ironworks were established, fuelled by the dense woodlands, and tileworks, whose kilns were also fired by forest timber. The energetic Cistercians of Vauluisant produced more than the abbey needed; the surplus was sold in the market towns of Troyes and Provins, where the abbots retained domiciles, and at the cathedral town of Sens.

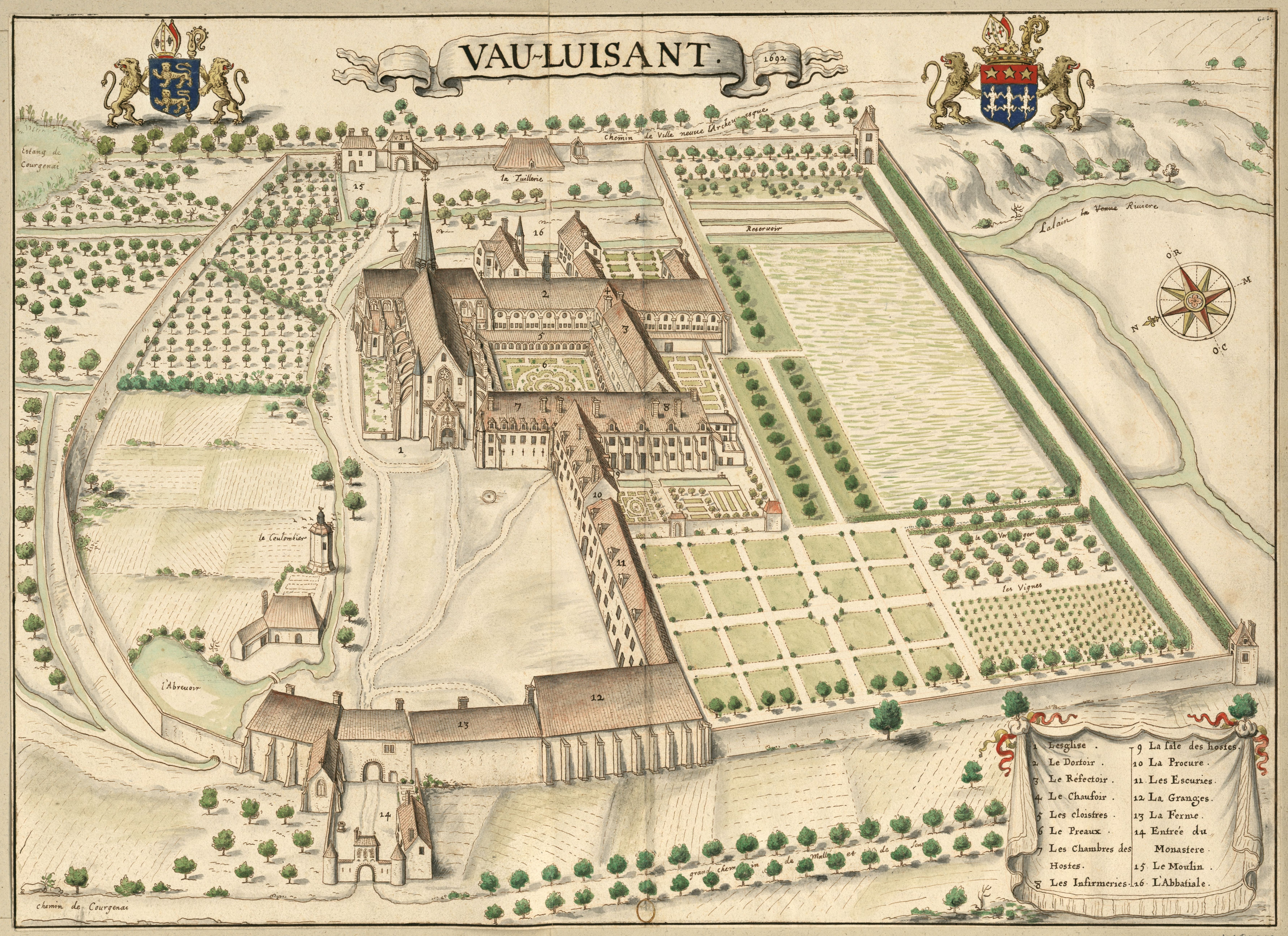
Vauluisant Abbey, by Roger de Gaignières.

The abbey was attacked and pillaged and its mills destroyed several times during the Hundred Years War; its ancient structures were repaired and rebuilt in the 15th century with the return of royal authority to the region of Sens in the reign of Charles VII. At the opening of the 16th century, under the direction of abbot Antoine Pierre (elected in 1502) the abbey was transformed and enlarged with an enclosed park, a grand fortified gatehouse, a grange dimière (tithe barn), a dovecote, a mill, a rebuilt chapel and spacious new lodgings for guests— the remains that can be recognized today. François I with his court was a guest at Vauluisant more than once, and Jacques de Savoie, 2nd Duc de Nemours was born at Vauluisant in 1531. But the rich benefice of Vauluisant attracted a series of abbots who held it in commendam, enjoying the income while the abbey slipped into disrepair; among them was Odet de Coligny, the well-beneficed cardinal who joined the Reformed church and was excommunicated.

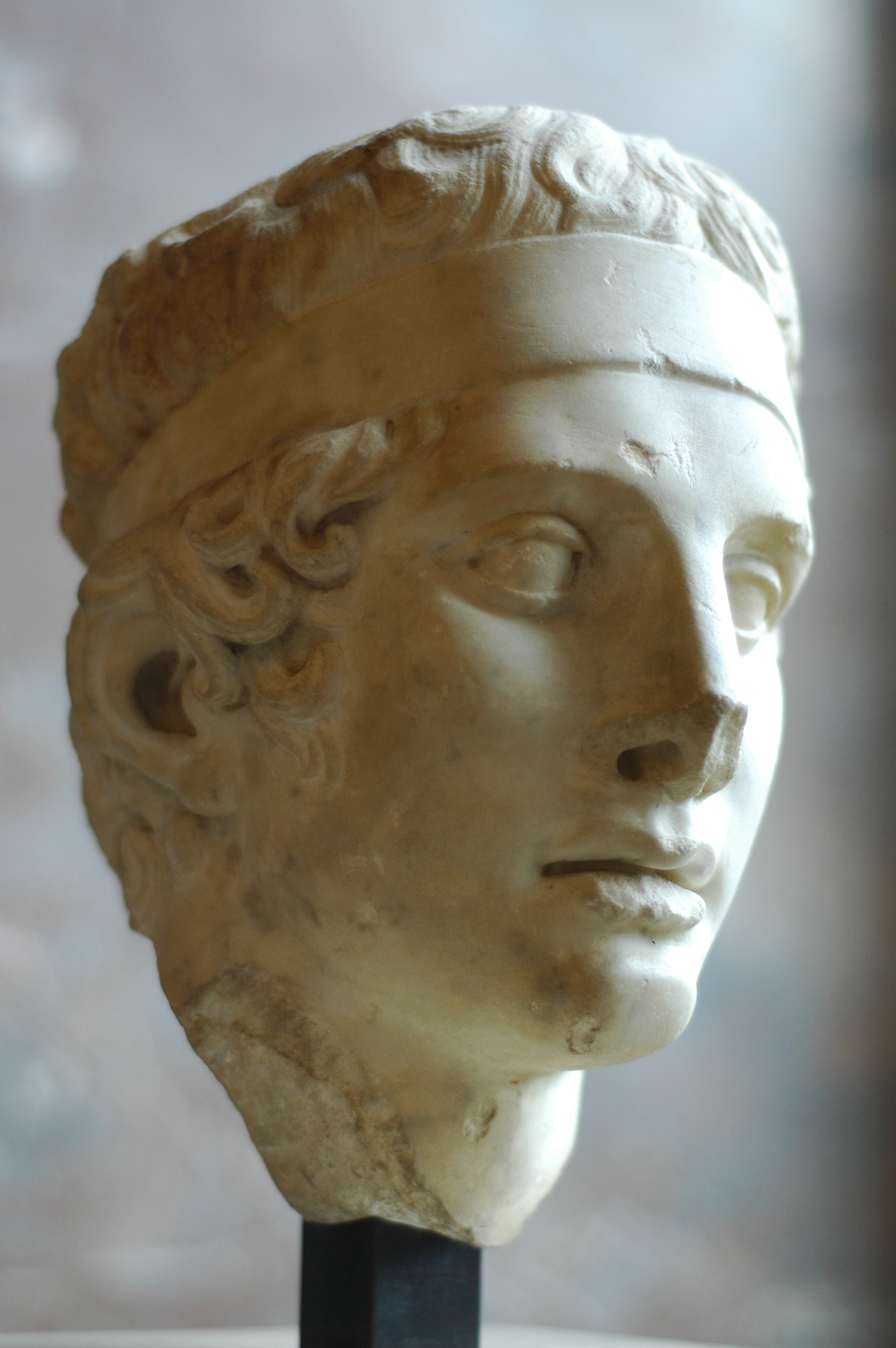
The Diadumenos head from Vauluisant, a 2nd-century CE Roman copy after a Greek model (Louvre)

During the French Wars of Religion, Vauluisant suffered further damage: an armed troop partially destroyed the abbey church in 1562, and there were multiple episodes of pillaging between 1571 and 1576. In 1636 Cardinal Richelieu imposed a reform, replacing the monks with strict Cistercians. A bird's-eye view of Vauluisant, drawn for Abbot Le Tellier in 1692 is conserved in the Bibliothèque nationale: it is a precious document of the state of the abbey's structures. A program of restorations was undertaken in the 18th century, funded by the Cistercians' sale of timber from abbey forests. The abbey was secularised in the Revolution and sold as a bien national. In 1835 it was purchased by the progressive banker Léopold Javal (1804–1872), who farmed the estate according to modern principles of agronomy; most of the structures had been demolished, leaving a range of the visitors' lodgings to the left of the fortified gatehouse, and the remains of the abbot's lodging, rebuilt in the 18th century and again 1866-, which constitutes the Château de Vauluisant. Considerable garden works were undertaken at the same time. Modern conservation of the former chapel of St. Mary Magdalene was undertaken from 1965 by M. Jean Gamby, and further conservation of the grange and commons. Vauluisant is the property of Mme Viviane Demoulin Gamby. It is open to visitors Sunday afternoons from April to October.

At Troyes, the Hôtel de Vauluisant, the abbot's seat in the cathedral city, has housed the Musée historique de Troyes et de Champagne, with a decorative arts collection that includes a 19th-century model of Troyes Cathedral. At the market centre of Provins, another Hôtel de Vauluisant conserves its 13th-century façade.

At Vauluisant during the time of Léopold Javal, in 1863 or 1865, while the farm was let to Edme-François Pailleret was found the fine marble head of Diadumenos type, a Roman copy after a Greek bronze original, now conserved in the Louvre. Its discovery identifies the site as having been a Roman villa about the time the sculpture was made, in the mid-2nd century CE.
