= François de Beaumont =

Provençal military leader (died 1587)

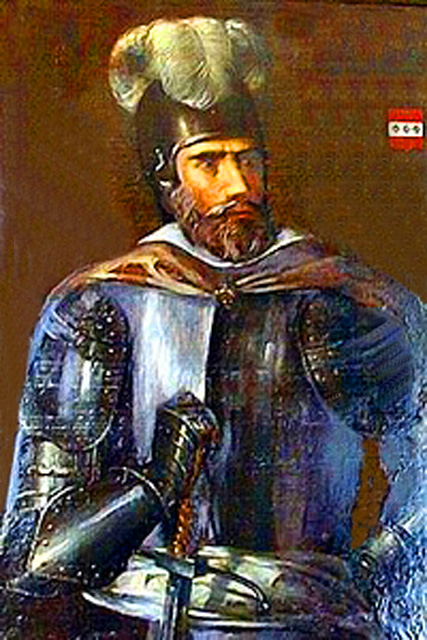
Baron des Adrets François de Beaumont.

François de Beaumont, baron des Adrets (c. 1512/1513 – 2 February 1587), was a Provençal military leader. He fought for the Valois monarchy during the Italian Wars distinguishing himself under Marshal Brissac. He fought against the crown for the Huguenot rebels during the first French Wars of Religion. Conducting himself with great brutality in his campaigns, he supported the crown in the subsequent civil wars. Having retired, he died on his estates in 1587.

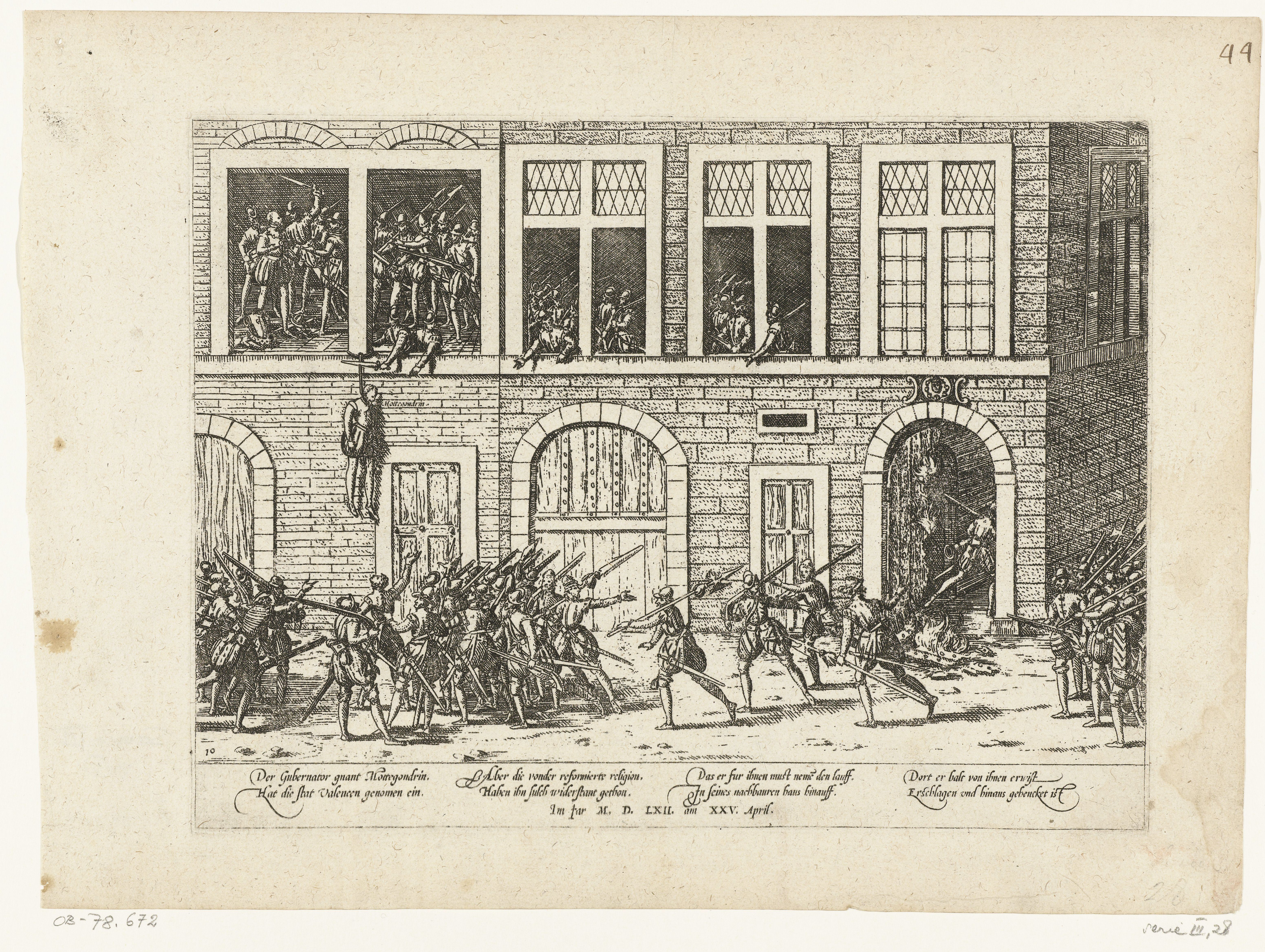
The Baron des Adret's men hang La Motte-Gondrin in Valence

== Biography ==
=== Early life ===
He was born in 1512 or 1513 at the château of La Frette (Isère).^{1} He was the son of Georges de Beaumont, baron des Adrets, and Jeanne Guiffrey. As a young man he forcibly rescued his sister from a convent, that she had been sent to against her will. He married Claude Gumin with whom he had several children. None of his sons survived him, with one being killed at the siege of La Rochelle in 1573. His two girls had only one offspring.

During the reign of Henry II of France he served with distinction in the royal army and became colonel of the legions of Dauphiné, Provence and Languedoc. From 1525 to 1559, he waged war in Italy, where he distinguished himself by his bravery under the orders of Marshal Brissac. He was taken prisoner in 1558 by the Spaniards in Moncalvo and had to pay a ransom for his freedom. He blamed the desertion of the Vidame d'Amiens on the field for his capture, and bore a grudge against him. Seeking redress for this, he brought the issue to the court; however, d'Amiens was a client of the powerful Guise, so nothing came of it. Catherine de Medici saw an opportunity for him to act as a counterweight in Dauphiné to the powerful Guisard governor, La Motte-Gondrin, and covertly reached out to him. In 1562 he joined the rebellion against the crown, desiring to revenge himself on the house of Guise.

=== First French War of Religion ===
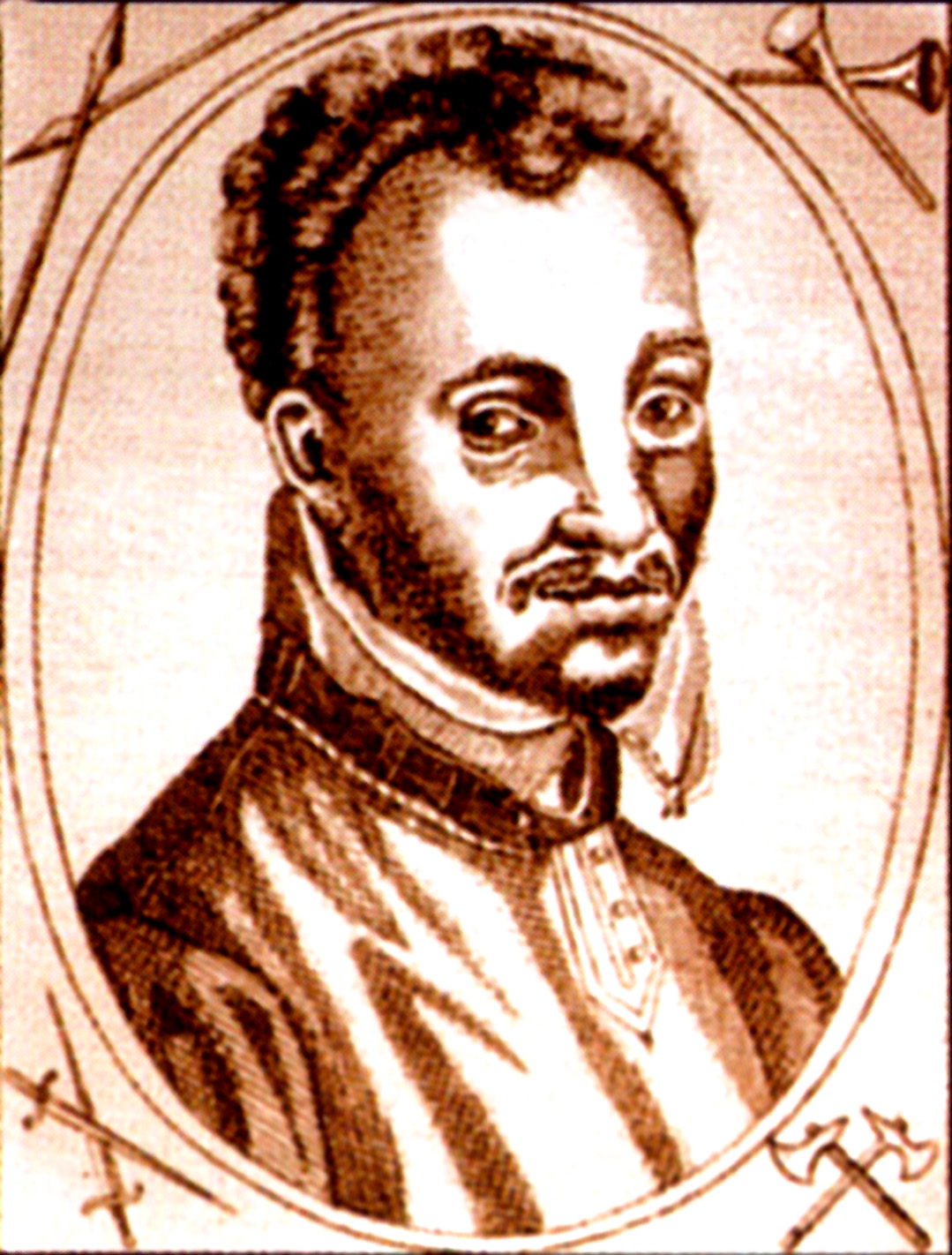
Baron des Adrets

His campaign against the Catholics in 1562 achieved great success. Following the defeat of the Protestant armies in Cahors, Amiens, Sens and the massacre of Wassy by the Duke of Guise in March 1562, he took command in April of Protestants of Provence, and entered Valence with 8000 men. Capturing the governor La Motte-Gondrin here, he allowed his followers to hang him. Going forth from Valence he routed the enemy in Romans-sur-Isère, Grenoble and Vienne where he plundered the Cathedral Saint-André and Notre-Dame de Grenoble. He drove out the new lieutenant-general of Dauphiné Laurent de Maugiron, forcing him into Burgundy. Garrisons that resisted him were butchered. He then went directly to the castle of Montrond, where the governor of Forez was entrenched. He entered the city the next day, plundering the church, and allegedly threw the priest and churchwarden from the belfry. On 5 May 1562, he returned victorious to the city of Lyon. He committed a massacre in Lyon, in 'revenge' for the massacres of the Huguenots at Orange on 6 May 1562. After Feurs in Forez, on 3 July, he marched on Montbrison at the head of four thousand, and seized the town on 14 July 1562. Here he forced eighteen prisoners to throw themselves from the top of the keep. In every town he conquered he proscribed Catholicism, and compelled the church to sell off their property.

Calvin, always uneasy with popular violence in the name of Calvinism received reports of des Adrets conduct with displeasure. On 17 July he was replaced in Lyon, as Lieutenant General, by Soubise at the behest of Condé. Papal forces responded to his terror tactics with terror of their own.

In November, he met the Duke of Nemours, besieged in Vienne, who offers him the title of governor of Dauphiné. In December Condé had him dismissed from this post.

His brutal style of warfare alienated even many Huguenot supporters of the rebellion against the crown, and he was informed of intercepted letters between Coligny and Soubise, criticising his conduct. Resultingly he entered into communication with the Catholics, declaring himself openly in favor of conciliation..On 10 January 1563 he was arrested by his lieutenants Mauvans and Montbrun on suspicion of plotting to hand his forces over to the crown, and confined in the citadel of Nîmes. He was liberated at the edict of Amboise in the following March, and, finding few friends among Protestant or Catholic factions, he retired to his château of La Frette.

=== Later career ===
Sensing a change in the political tides, the Baron soon left the Protestant religion and returned to Catholicism. In 1564, he failed to seize the town of Sancerre, a Protestant stronghold. He considered the undertaking difficult and advised Claude de La Châtre, governor of Berry, to retire. In 1567, he returned to war alongside the lieutenant general of Dauphiné, Gordes, now fighting for the crown. Two years later he returns to the country, but his foot was crushed in Selongey. Finally, in the Trièves, he won his last battle against Lesdiguières. He died in bed on 2 February 1587 in his castle of La Frette. The place of his burial is not known.

== Notes ==
1. Alternative sources suggest he was born around 1506 in the fortified house of his father in Villard-Castle, in the town of Adrets.

== Sources ==
- Terrebasse, Humbert (1905). Histoire et généalogie de la famille de Maugiron, en Viennois, 1257-1767. L Brun.
