= Preuilly Abbey =

Abbey in Seine-et-Marne, France

Coordinates: 48°26′46″N 03°06′42″E

Preuilly Abbey (French: Abbaye de Preuilly; Latin: Prulliacum) was a Cistercian monastery in Égligny in the Seine-et-Marne department, France. It was located about 21 kilometres south-west of Provins and 15 kilometres east of Montereau-Fault-Yonne.

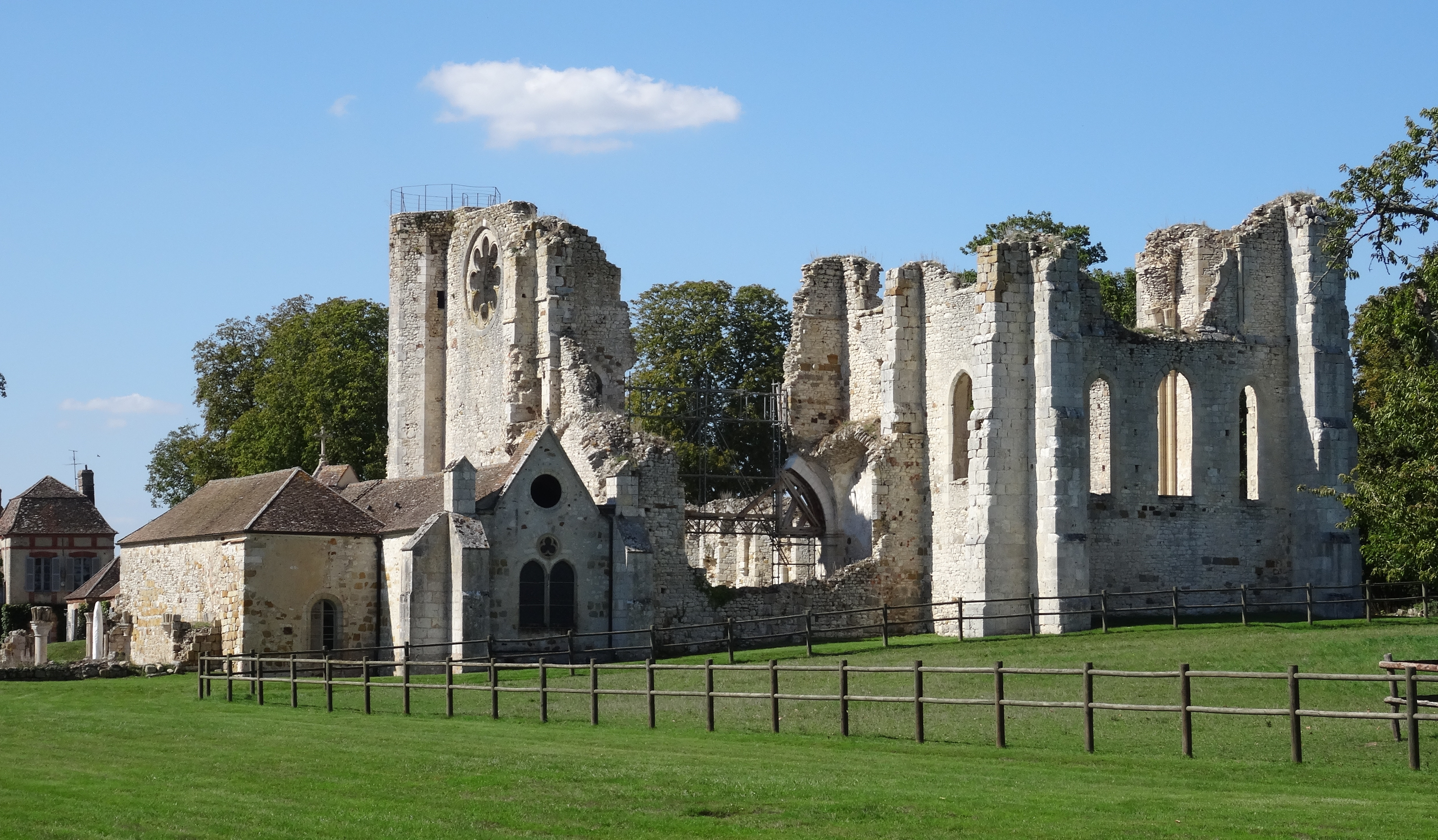
The abbey ruins

== History ==
Preuilly Abbey, the fifth daughter house of Cîteaux Abbey, was founded in 1118 by Stephen Harding on a site provided by Theobald of Blois, Count of Champagne. The first abbot was Arthaud. The abbey soon became prosperous and founded its own daughter houses, Vauluisant Abbey (1129) and Barbeau Abbey (1148). In 1146 La Colombe Abbey, founded some years previously, joined the Cistercian Order and put itself under the supervision of Preuilly.

In the 14th and 15th centuries the monastery was sacked and laid waste several times, and occupied by English troops. In 1536 it passed into the hands of commendatory abbots. It was plundered again in 1567 during the Wars of Religion and in 1652 during the Fronde. The buildings were restored at the beginning of the 18th century.

After the dissolution of the abbey in 1791 during the French Revolution the church was used as a saltpetre factory, and the other buildings were sold off at auction to different owners. Considerable demolition took place, which was brought to an end only in the years between 1829 and 1846, when a Dr. Husson bought up the site in small portions. The surviving buildings have been protected since 1927 as a Monument historique.

== Buildings and precinct ==
The church, which dates from the second third of the 12th century and had a choir with a rose window and a transept with another rose window in the south front, is in ruins, as is the chapter house. The passage from the cloister to the church survives, as do the armarium, the sacristy, the entrance portal to the monastery between two round towers, and a part of the abbot's house. The abbey's 13th-century townhouse in Provins also survives.
