= Château d'Annecy =

Restored castle in Annecy, France

Coordinates: 45°53′51″N 6°7′34″E

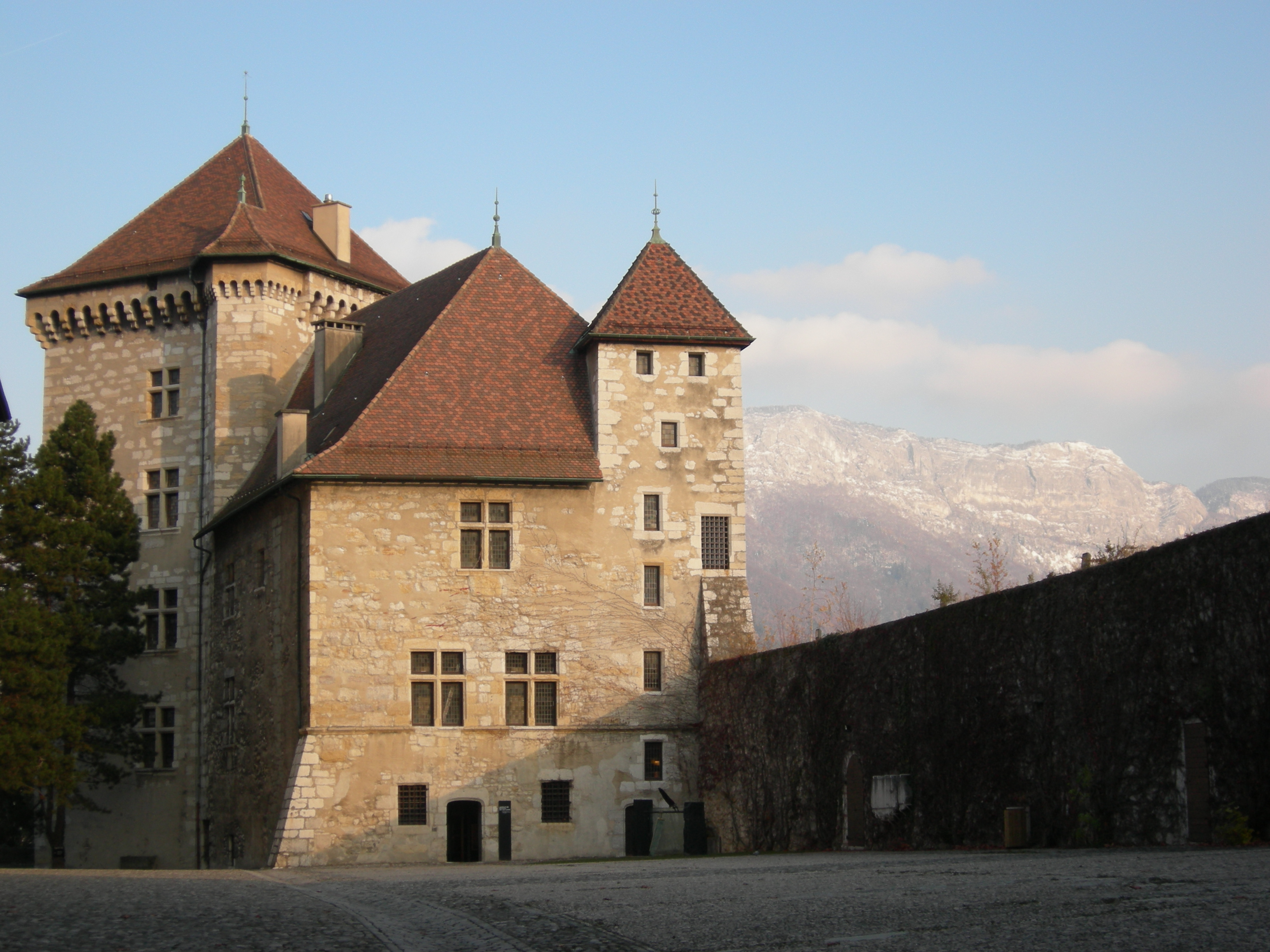
Château d'Annecy

The Château d'Annecy is a restored castle which dominates the old French town of Annecy in the Haute-Savoie département. It was bought by the town, restored and transformed into a museum, le musée-château d'Annecy. The castle is listed as a monument historique by the French Ministry of Culture since 1959.

== History ==
The castle was built between the 12th and 16th centuries. It served as the residence of the Counts of Geneva and the Dukes of Genevois-Nemours. Several times the victim of fires, the castle was abandoned in the 17th century and later repaired to serve as a barracks until 1947. The town of Annecy acquired the castle in 1953, restored it with the help of Monuments historiques and installed a museum there.

Since 1993, the Tower and the Logis Perrière have housed an observatory (l'Observatoire régional des lacs alpins).

== Description ==
The Tour de la Reine (Queen's Tower) is the oldest part of the castle, dating from the 12th century. Its walls are over 4 m (13 ft) thick. At the bottom of the courtyard, the tower and the Logis Perrière date from the 15th century. Other notable parts of the castle are: the Vieux Logis, the Logis Nemours, the Logis Neuf. From the castle terrace there is a view over the old town with its narrow streets and decorated roofs.

The museum is installed in the Logis Vieux and the Logis Nemours. The observatory is in the Tower and the Logis Perrière.

== Museums ==
Of particular note is the Museum of Alpine Popular Art (Musée d'art populaire alpin) with numerous regional sculptures and paintings. There is an important collection of vernacular furniture, dating from the 15th century onwards, sculpted objects, photographs and models of Alpine chalets.

== Observatory ==
L'Observatoire régional des lacs alpins (Alpine Lakes Regional Observatory) includes exhibitions covering:

- archaeological evidence of the first lakeside inhabitants
- aquariums with fish from different types of mountain lake
- model of Lake Annecy and its mountain environment
- models showing the evolution of boats on the lake
- fishing equipment used in the Alps
- birds

== See also ==
- List of castles in France
