= Lyonnais =

Historical province of France

Coordinates: 45.75°N 4.83°E

- Province of the Kingdom of France
- Flag

- Capital: Lyon

The Lyonnais (French pronunciation: [ljɔnɛ], Arpitan: Liyonês) is a historical province of France which owes its name to the city of Lyon.

The geographical area known as the Lyonnais became part of the Kingdom of Burgundy after the division of the Carolingian Empire. The disintegration of Imperial control, especially after the fall of the Hohenstaufens in 1254, led to French encroachment and eventual acquisition by King Philip IV of France in 1313. Lyonnais now often simply refers to the area around the city of Lyon.

The local speech-form known as Lyonnais is a dialect of the Francoprovençal language that is spoken in the region, but its use is marginal.
