= Charles IX's grand tour of France =

Royal tour of France 1564–6

Top level overview of the route the court took from 1564 to 1566

Charles IX's grand tour of France was a royal tour of the French kingdom which transpired from 13 March 1564 to 10 May 1566. There were several aims to this tour, to rebuild royal authority which had been damaged by the first French War of Religion, to show king Charles IX to his subjects, to undertake diplomatic meetings with foreign sovereigns, to foster connections between Charles and his nobility, and to see the implementation of the edict of Amboise and other royal ordinances across the kingdom. The edict of Amboise had brought the first civil war to a close, and allowed for a limited toleration of Protestantism, something which was resisted strongly in many parts of the kingdom, and by the Parlements, the eight highest courts of the kingdom that in addition to judging cases, also registered royal legislation before it could go into effect.

The tour started in Champagne, and would prove the occasion for the making of peace with England during its stay in Troyes during April. Moving into Lorraine, the court met up with duc de Lorraine (duke of Lorraine), and his wife, Claude of Valois. From here the court descended into first Burgundy and then the Lyonnais, where the one-time Protestant stronghold was subjected to a royal garrison and fortress. From here into Dauphiné, where the edict of Amboise was modified in a way unfavourable to the Protestants. Passing through the Papal exclave of Comtat Venaissin the French crown established a peace arrangement between the Protestants and Catholics of the territory, before heading on into Provence. Here, the court tried to temper the virulently Catholic parlement of Aix, and took the opportunity of being in Marseille to go out in ships on the Mediterranean.

Entering into Languedoc, the court was troubled by foul weather but buoyed by news that the Spanish king Philip II had consented to a meeting between his wife, Élisabeth and Charles/Catherine. The court tarried for a while in Toulouse, settling local disputes, and taking the parlement to account. Heading into Guyenne, the royal meeting with Élisabeth was undertaken in June, before the court reunited with the Protestant queen of Navarre, who Catherine unsuccessfully campaigned to tolerate Catholicism in her sovereign territories. Passing through areas of great Protestant strength such as La Rochelle, and the Saintonge, the crown took a harsh line, the reception in La Rochelle proving a particularly cold one. The court then moved up into Brittany, staying a while near Nantes before swinging back eastwards towards the heart of the kingdom.

Arriving in Moulins, the crown would attempt to quash a festering feud between the Lorraine-Guise and the Coligny-Châtillon. However, while achieving a formal reconciliation between the parties, the dispute would continue to burn on. The stay at Moulins was also the occasion for a wide-reaching legislative package, based on the conditions the court had observed throughout the kingdom in the preceding years. This was known as the Grand Ordinance of Moulins. Though its immediate effects would be compromised by the civil wars, it would leave a long legacy. Leaving Moulins, the court headed back for Paris, arriving there in May 1566. Catherine was pleased with the success of the tour, boasting on it to her ambassador in Spain, however, only a year later, France would return to civil war.

== Saint-Maur and Fontainebleau ==
=== Departure ===
On 24 January 1564, the French court departed from Paris, and made for the royal residence of the château de Saint-Maur which was near the château de Vincennes. This residence was a recent royal acquisition, having been purchased by the queen mother Catherine the preceding year. When the cardinal de Lorraine reunited with the French court on 29 January, his reception was a cool one. King Charles was absent from the court on a hunt, and Catherine was taking the air on a stroll. Lorraine was thus forced to wait alone for several hours until Charles returned. Charles' greeting to the cardinal was a similarly cold one, leaving him standing, cap in hand, while placing a hand on Lorraine's shoulder. The son of the constable de Montmorency had to point out the discourtesy. The Constable himself was similarly discourteous, putting his hand on the cardinal's shoulder and checking to see whether he was armed. It would be duchesse d'Uzès who greeted him with several kisses, an act that was imitated by the Protestant prince de Condé. A tense conversation then followed in which the cardinal de Lorraine expressed his desire not to speak in front of the 'heretics', and he was chided for not understanding developments in France such as the edict of Amboise. Catherine queried of him whether there was truth to the rumour that he was raising soldiers. The historian Champion argues that the cardinal de Lorraine had sold out the French Gallican position, including those Catholic French bishops influenced by Protestantism who were now to be turned over to the inquisition. He suggests this explains the frosty reception Lorraine experienced. The next day, the cardinal hosted a banquet. That same day, the court made its departure from Saint-Maur for the château de Fontainebleau. The Marne was forded at the Charenton bridge, with lunch held at Villeneuve-Saint-Georges. The court spent the night at Corbeil before continuing its progress on 31 January. This day, they lunched at an abbey near Melun, arriving that evening at Fontainebleau.

=== Tridentine decrees ===
The cardinal de Lorraine had recently returned from the council of Trent and sought to see the Catholic Tridentine decrees (the outcomes of that ecumenical council) adopted in France. Many opposed the Tridentine decrees on the grounds that their adoption would compromise the Gallican liberties (the autonomy of the French church from Papal oversight) of the French church. Various decrees of the council attacked the autonomy of the French church as concerned clerical justice and asserted Papal supremacy over Catholicism. The council of Trent had challenged the practice of ecclesiastical pluralism (holding of multiple offices), and the cardinals de Lorraine and his brother the cardinal de Guise would step back from their holding of multiple benefices. This did not mean surrendering of control, as they resigned the offices to their clients. Indeed, in response to 'the reformation of the princes' a Papal proposal at the council by which princes would only be able to levy taxes in times of great difficulty or war with the 'infidel', the crown had ordered the French delegation at the council withdraw. The cardinal de Lorraine, initially part of the opposition in the council had undertaken an about face of the course of his time in Trent and become a partisan of the ultramontane (Papal supremacist) cause. He had been unable to convince the French delegates to return to Trent. Though Gallican, the Faculty of Theology in Paris supported the cardinal de Lorraine in the matter of the adoption of the Tridentine decrees. The parlement (highest court of appeals in ancien régime France, also responsible for signing royal legislation into law) of Paris by contrast baulked. Lorraine pushed his position in royal council on 22 February and was met with stringent opposition from the chancellor L'Hôpital. The présidents (senior judges) of the Paris parlement were also present for the occasion. L'Hôpital would find allies in them for his campaign against Trent, their protectiveness of Gallican liberties superseding any other considerations they might hold. L'Hôpital was a former client of the Lorraine-Guise who had defected from service to their house in favour of service to the queen mother. Lorraine exploded at the 'insolence' and 'ingratitude' of L'Hôpital in opposing his efforts regarding the Tridentine decrees, accusing the chancellor in council of being a secret convert to Protestantism, for his wife (Marie Morin) and daughter were both Protestants. This was indeed the opinion of the Spanish party concerning the chancellor. L'Hôpital shot back that the Lorraine-Guise bore the blame for the 1562 massacre of Wassy and the first French War of Religion. Lorraine appealed to the queen mother, that the pope was now ready to make the concessions she had sought from the church in 1562, communion under both kinds (receiving both the bread and the wine during Mass) and the liturgy being partly in French, Catherine however was no longer interested.

Consultations were subsequently undertaken on the Tridentine decrees and related matters. Invited into the conseil privé for the occasion, the présidents de Thou, Séguier, Prévost, and Harlay, the avocat général du Mesnil, his assistant Boucherat, and the procureur général Bourdin. Catherine looked to reassure the Papal nuncio, cardinal Santacroce that these parlementaires would be kept in order. The parlementaires reacted in opposition to the decrees. They were a threat to the peace as the situation stood now and should be delayed until such time as the Protestants were no longer a threat. These discussions continued in secrecy for the following three weeks. Du Mesnil wrote up his objections in a work entitled Advertissement sur le faict du Concile de Trente. He took up a Gallican position; the French church was subordinate only to God's law and earlier church councils. The rulings of modern popes and councils only had relevance at the king's discretion to implement their conclusions. He then moved into a discussion of the threat the decrees posed to the kingdom fresh off its civil war. To advocate for these decrees at a time of such fragility in the kingdom was to be a disloyal subject, who should not be tolerated. He then moved onto procedural troubles. It was flawed by fact of being a continuation of prior Trent sessions, rather than a new council. Further, it contradicted prior councils, and expanded papal power, rather than curtailing it. It was also guilty of collaborating with Spanish attempts to usurp the precedence of the French. Moving to the specific decrees, he objected to those which pushed aside the rights of secular authorities in favour of clerical oversight. These were an assault on Gallicanism and subordinated the king and the law to the Papacy. Bourdin preferred resignation from the parlement to registering the findings of the council. Unsatisfied with du Mesnil's dismantling of the findings, he produced his own work, which challenged sixty of the Trent articles. De Thou rejected the Tridentine decrees in their totality, while Séguier took a more moderate position, only finding some of them to be objectionable. With the consultations of Fontainebleau over, Catherine declared that a decision on the Tridentine decrees would be made in May.

Another difficult encounter that is supposed to have occurred between Catherine and the cardinal de Lorraine involved the queen mother's observation that Lorraine maintained regular correspondence with the Spanish churchman, and administrator, cardinal Granvelle. Lorraine admitted he maintained such a correspondence, noting that he desired to remain abreast of affairs relating to the health of the Catholic church. He noted that in all other matters he was a servant of the French crown, but that if the king no longer desired his services, he would take his leave, and head abroad.

The court would rest at Fontainebleau for the next forty-three days. A joint Hispano-Imperial-Savoyard embassy came to Fontainebleau at this time, to ask that the French king to join a conference of Catholic powers at Nancy which would deliberate on the implementation of the resolutions of the council of Trent and the eradication of Protestantism in France. Catherine was not hostile to the idea of a meeting, as long as it did not necessitate the implementation of the decrees. Charles rebuffed this advance, noting that while he would live and die in the Catholic faith, he little desired to rupture his edict of pacification, or plunge his kingdom back into civil war. Rather than react with fiery opposition to this rebuffing, as he might have done in prior years, the Spanish king Philip II simply noted that he had implemented the Tridentine decrees in their entirety.

In mid-February, the cardinal de Lorraine was invited by the royal family to open the season of Lent with a sermon. The night before he was due to deliver it, Protestants snuck into the chapel, defecating on his ceremonial chair.

=== Protestant disquiet ===
While in Fontainebleau in March 1564, Catherine and Charles would listen to a large number of Protestant deputies who were looking to petition the crown. This included men from the diocese of Béziers, Nîmes, Montpellier, Uzès, and Viviers, and a tax collector from Mâcon among others.

During the court's stay at Fontainebleau, the duchess of Ferrara complained of the refusal of Catherine to permit her a Protestant preacher in her residence at the court. She asserted that she was the daughter of a king, and that the princesse de Condé had enjoyed the employ of a pastor in her residence. Catherine replied that while she recognised the duchess was indeed of French royal blood, neither she, nor the princesse de Condé were allowed to conduct Protestant preaching at the court. She would have seized ministers from either of them. Infuriated at this, the duchess of Ferrara departed court. She demanded she be given the 80,000 écus she was owed.

In the opinion of the Spanish ambassador, these Catholic gestures from Catherine indicated the possibility that the court would travel into Lorraine. They were to the irritation of the Montmorency family. Catherine was even looking to see the cardinal de Châtillon divested of his cardinal cap.

In March, the Protestant admiral de Coligny made a brief return to court. This was the occasion of the visit of Protestant delegations from Sens, Rouen, Blois, and Amiens. They had come to complain of the murder of Protestants in the wake of the edict of Amboise by the Catholics. Charles and Catherine invited these representatives into the house of the prince de La Roche-sur-Yon to hear them. The royal assurances that they would observe and do what needed to be done did not satisfy the representatives. The admiral de Coligny then stepped forward, and offered his service, and those of his 3,000 gentlemen to the king. Charles instead, turned to summon the virulently Catholic duc de Montpensier (brother of the prince de La Roche-sur-Yon). A resentful Coligny departed court again for his estates at Châtillon.

=== Festivities ===
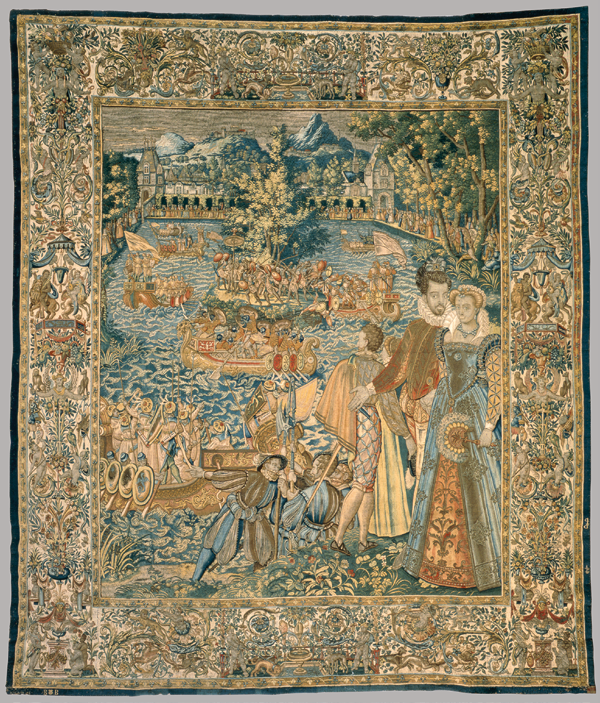
Festivities at the Château de Fontainebleau on the eve of the court's departure on the tour

While the court stayed at Fontainebleau, it played host to an abnormally large number of festivities, with suppers overseen by the constable de Montmorency and cardinal de Bourbon. On Shrove Sunday (13 February), it was Catherine's turn to host a feast, something she undertook at the residence known as 'La Vacherie'. After the feast, a comedy was performed in the afternoon. Catherine, a fan of theatre, had soured on tragedies after the death of her husband, believing they brought bad luck. In one play performed during the courts stay at Fontainebleau, a pastoral (titled La Bergerie) written by the poet Pierre de Ronsard for the occasion of the Fontainebleau festivities, to the accompaniment of a lute, Catherine took on the role of a shepherdess presiding over the royal children: Carlin (Charles IX as the senior shepherd) 'Orléantin (the duc d'Orléans), Margot (Marguerite), Angelot (the duc d'Anjou), Navarrin (the prince de Béarn), and Guisin (the duc de Guise). In this performance, Orléans recited some of Ronsard's work. The troubles of the civil war were alluded to in the work, as was the dependency of Navarrin on Carlin to protect his fields from avaricious neighbours. In return for French protection, Navarrin owed Carlin his loyalty. In total, Ronsard composed around 2,000 lines of poetry for the royal festivities in Fontainebleau. The translated play of Ludovico Ariosto, La Belle Genièvre was also performed. With the conclusion performed by the French ambassador to England: the seigneur de Mauvissière.

The next day, Shrove Monday, it was the turn of her son, the king's brother, the duc d'Orléans, to play host for a feast. The king arrived at Orléans residence at 09:00, to be greeted by a military fanfare. In the water, youths were dressed as sirens. One of these sirens read a poem in honour of Charles to the accompaniment of a lute. This poem gave praise to the reign of Charles' father, Henri II as a time of gold. Though the kingdom had fallen into discord, his son, with the support of the duc d'Orléans, would resurrect the kingdom. Finally, Catherine was praised for her nurture of Charles and Orléans. Next was a Neptune, riding a chariot driven by four seahorses. He too had verse to recite, acknowledging Charles' power over the sea. The king continued to progress, and was met by a nymph, who emerged from a rock, singing a sonnet in praise of the king. Musicians concealed in another rock played for Charles as he progressed. The king reached the staircase to the banquet hall, where he was showered with flowers dropped from the ceiling. After the meal, three goddesses (Juno, Pallas, and Venus) proffered the king gifts – a golden globe, a cupid, and a trophy that represented war and peace. Several little people came to Charles with a letter to explain a joust that was to follow. Six Greeks and six Trojans needed to settle a quarrel over the merits of their women. A combat followed, pitting two teams of six knights against one another. One team was captained by du Perron (the future duc de Retz), the other by the Count Rhinegrave. The fighting was undertaken on foot. Such tournament games had value for the monarchy, in showing that the king and his brothers were martial war leaders at a time of political fragility. The grandeur of the event also illustrated to observers that France remained a great power.

In the combat of Shrove Tuesday, which saw a party of knights assault an enchanted castle (which featured a giant and devils) where women are being held captive, the prince de Condé led the defence of the castle, and the four maréchaux of France attacked the place on horseback at the head of groups of men-at-arms. The men-at-arms were in six bands of six, and led by the prince dauphin d'Auvergne, the teenage duc de Guise (duke of Guise), Louis de Gonzague (future duc de Nevers), the current duc de Nevers, the duc de Longueville and the Count Rhinegrave. The wizard Merlin predicted that only the most valiant gentlemen could break the spell that held over the fortress. The young duc d'Orléans had command of the platoon for the assault on the magic castle. Trapdoors, fire throwing devils and other challenges awaited the attackers. Only the king himself would gain entry to the tower. Jouanna sees in this display, a reinforcement of hierarchy. After the combat, the king took everyone to his feast.

As the days of celebrations continued, more and more nobles and officials arrived at Fontainebleau. It became clear they were gathering for the coming journey around the kingdom.

=== Around the kingdom ===
The French court was, in this era, a peripatetic one, moving between various residences along the Loire and in the Île de France. However, the coming journey around the kingdom would be of a completely different scale.

From 13 March 1564 to May 1566, the French court undertook a tour of the kingdom. Over the twenty-eight months of the travel, the court would cover a distance of almost 4,000 kilometres (910 leagues in the unit of the time), and make one-hundred-and-eight ceremonial Royal Entries into towns and cities across the kingdom. While the general itinerary was likely established in advance, some of the stops on the route were more off the cuff. The pace was also hostage to the king's health, the weather, and the conditions on the road. Of the 829 days of the tour, the court would be moving on 201 of them, while staying in place the other 628. The stages of the journey varied in length between eight and forty kilometres (or five and fifty-eight in Knecht's estimation) with an average distance between stops of nineteen kilometres. When the court stayed in a place, public Protestant worship, if it were allowed there by the edict of Amboise, was to cease until their departure. The north of the kingdom, bordering the channel, would not be covered in the tour's journey. However, the king had visited Rouen the year previous. Rather, the majority of the expedition would focus on the war torn south, and those cities particularly troubled by religious disorder. By the means of this tour, it was hoped that the people of France would be bound tighter to their king, Charles, and to the queen mother Catherine. This was after those connections between the crown and the people had been frayed by the preceding civil war. As the tour progressed, nobles would be summoned to the king's side. Their loyalty was traded for receipt of honour from the king: induction into the chivalric order of Saint-Michel (the highest royal order of chivalry, the distribution of which proliferated over the course of the tour), positions in the royal household such as gentilhomme de la chambre du Roi (gentleman of the king's chamber) and military office in urban government or at the head of companies. By distributing such honours personally, rather than having them be distributed by the great nobles of the kingdom, direct links could be established between the crown and the provincial nobility. Oaths of obedience would be given to Catherine and Charles. It would also be possible to display for the people of the kingdom the power and virtue of the crown. Potentially festering local conflicts would also be quenched as the king arbitrated on religious disputes, and heard grievances. Catherine had the ambition for the tour to also serve as a great diplomatic exercise, with possibilities to rendezvous with her son-in-law the king of Spain Philip II, the Holy Roman Emperor Maximilian II (in Lorraine), her son-in-law the duc de Lorraine and his wife, Catherine's daughter, Claude. With Maximilian, it would be perhaps possible to negotiate a marriage for Charles with his daughter Anna, and one for Marguerite with his son Rudolf. These were to be direct meetings of sovereigns, avoiding the intermediary role of ambassadors. Writing to the admiral de Coligny shortly after the start of the tour on 17 April 1564, Catherine explained that the king was undertaking the trip in part so that his will concerning the edict of Amboise could not be misunderstood. In a letter to Montmorency of 19 April, Catherine explained that until this point the edict of Amboise had been ill applied, and this tour would allow for the remedy of this.

While the king was on his travels, great seigneurs (both Catholic and Protestant) were prohibited from spending time in Paris, with the exception of the city's governor, the maréchal de Montmorency (eldest son of the constable de Montmorency). The queen mother would remain in intimate communication with the capital through her epistolary pursuits during the tour. Of the 413 letters she wrote during the tour, 74 were sent to the maréchal (marshal of France, one of the most senior military offices in the kingdom) de Montmorency (governor of Paris and the Île de France), 22 to the mayor and aldermen of the city, and 14 to the Paris parlement. In addition to concerns about law and order, this also served to keep her informed of her building program (chief among which was the Tuileries Palace).

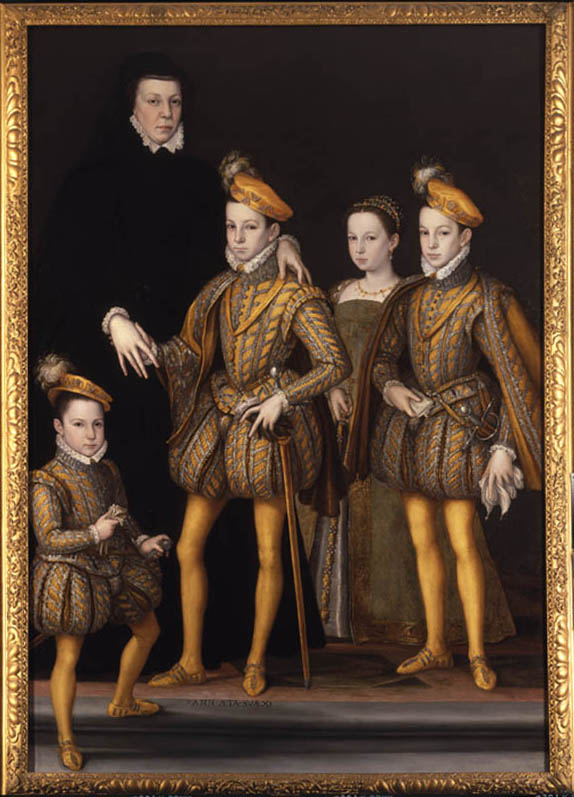
Catherine de' Medici and her children, king Charles IX is on the left being held by Catherine, the duc d'Orléans is on the right, between them stands Marguerite, and in the front the duc d'Anjou who would only intermittently accompany the tour

The courts progress for this tour was of a grand scale, with thousands of persons and animals. Method of travel would vary depending on social status, with Catherine and Charles enjoying travel by coach and litter, or horseback. The rank and file by contrast, always travelled on foot. In total there were between 10,000 and 15,000 persons, including a large array of soldiers (described as a veritable army by Solnon, indeed it comprised four companies of men-at-arms, a company of light cavalry and the French guard under their colonel, the seigneur de Strozzi), who was close enough to Catherine to describe her as his cousin, being married to a Medici), the households of the various greats, the royal council, the chancellery, the treasury and chests filled with linens, tapestries and crockery. Various pack animals were employed for the carrying of Catherine's wardrobe among other luggage. There were also a host of artisans and merchants who travelled with the court to service its needs. Leading the king's household would be the seigneur de Boisy, who was the royal grand écuyer (grand equerry). The king boasted in his household various entertainers, secretaries, doctors, notaries, cooks, tailors, animals, and other persons. In Catherine's entourage alone were to be found three-hundred ladies, containing many princesses and wives of office holders. The royal children, and those of other important households were also to be found in her entourage. In addition to these ladies and children, were a host of servants, tutors, chaplains, valets and others. Among the grandees travelling with the court were the constable de Montmorency; the cardinals de Bourbon and de Lorraine; the princes du sang (princes descended of the royal house through the male line) of the house of Bourbon: the prince de Béarn (future king Henri IV of France) and his uncle the prince de Condé; the king's siblings: the duc d'Orléans (future king Henri III), the duc d'Anjou, and his sister Marguerite. The role of the constable de Montmorency on the tour was not one of sword bearing. Montmorency acted as the advanced guard of the court, making for places before the court itself arrived so that he could take the measure of the places the court was to visit, assign lodgings, reach understandings with local officials and oversee the encampment once it had been established. He made the journey with his wife, Madeleine. Champion describes him as a maintainer of order. For the French four secretaries of state, in the initial stages of the journey the court was accompanied by the seigneur de Villeines, seigneur de Fresne and seigneur d'Alluye. They were joined at Dijon by the baron de Châteauneuf, and the secretaries would cycle through the remainder of the journey such that there were always two or three present with Catherine. Holt notes that while earlier histories have claimed that Anjou did not accompany the royal family on the voyage due to his young age, he would accompany the court for its initial stages, before ill-health forced him to retire in the summer of 1564. He would subsequently rejoin the court. Also present were the various members of the court, the Swiss and Scots guard, foreign ambassadors to the French kingdom and various young nobles. Among the diplomats, only the Spanish ambassador Álava and the Papal Nuncio would stay with the court for the duration of the voyage around the kingdom. Through this comprehensive journey around France, Charles, Orléans and Béarn (all in their turn kings of France) received a geographic education of the contours of the French kingdom no prior king of France had enjoyed. The participants in the tour were not a static group, but rather waxed and waned over the course of the journey. Many nobles would financially ruin themselves through their spending during the tour.

=== Prominent absentees ===
Notably absent from the tour was the recently returned cardinal de Lorraine. Having been spurned at the court when he attempted to present the Tridentine decrees to the royal council, he retired to his archbishopric of Reims. From here he promoted the council of Trent through the sponsoring of a translation of the acts of the council. From 25 November to 13 December 1563, the cardinal de Lorraine hosted a council at Reims. He undertook a lot of speaking for this council, proclaiming that before one sought to reform the church, one must first reform the self. He announced he was happy to be cross-examined over his conduct at Trent and the earlier 1561 colloquy of Poissy. The other bishops gathered there protested that they did not wish to critique him. On 29 November, a profession of faith was made by those present, starting with the cardinal de Lorraine. On 4 December, a hot dispute arose during the meeting over the matter of the 'heretical prelate', the cardinal de Châtillon. The cardinal de Lorraine avoided participating in this particular debate. Ultimately, the council only produced, in the words of the historian Venard 'lacklustre statutes', deferring some matters to a future council that never transpired.

By 1567, the cardinal de Lorraine had established a seminary at Reims, as well as establishing a Capuchin community at Meudon, and patronising the Jesuits.

Also absent were the Protestant Châtillon brothers, who like the cardinal de Lorraine, retired to their estates. Though the seigneur d'Andelot did accompany the tour in its initial steps. Haan writes that the Châtillon brothers were appalled at the prospect of a re-establishment of monarchical authority over the kingdom. Their departure little bothered Catherine, who noted to her daughter, the Spanish queen Élisabeth, that if Coligny deigned to return, she would have no time for him. The historian Boltanski argues that this was one of the advantages envisioned in the mobile court of the grand tour, that it would keep away undesirable nobles from the court while allowing the great families to relay which of their members were present.

== Champagne ==
=== Sens ===
On the morning of 13 March, the trumpets sounded for the departure, and the courtly train assembled. The first stops of the tour would be in the east of the kingdom. The town of Moret was crossed in the afternoon, with the court taking the night in Montereau which stood at the juncture of the Yonne and the Seine. The next day, the court made a stop at Pont-sur-Yonne. Leaving the place after lunch, they crossed the Yonne by bridge and made for Sens. After having ridden all day, the court arrived in Sens, a city noted for its militant Catholicism. The city had enjoyed the presence of a strong Protestant population, until the massacre of Sens in April 1562. From the Yonne gate, the bailli (bailiff) of Sens marched out at the head of the local nobility to the edge of the suburb of Saint-Didier to greet the royal party. The court made an entry into Sens. Carpets hung from windows for the occasion, and children bearing torches lit the path as night fell. Below the gate, Robert Hémard, who had presided over the 1562 massacre, delivered a harangue to the French court as he presented the keys of the city to Charles. He compared the qualities of the king and his brothers with the good kings of the Old Testament. Catherine also came in for praise from Hémard. The cannons then fired a salvo. Twenty-six small boys dressed identically and wearing the arms of Charles IX cried out "Long live the King!". The next day, speeches followed from the municipal officers, this time accompanied with the gift of a gilded silver vase the city had paid for. The duc d'Aumale (who served as lieutenant-general and acting governor during the minority of Champagne's governor, his nephew the duc de Guise) was also awarded a gift, a gilded silver cup. While in Sens, the king visited the arquebus shooting range and gave the weapons a go. The visit to Sens was the occasion for the hearing before the conseil privé of complaints against the procureur du roi (King's prosecutor) of Sens.

=== Troyes ===
After three days in Sens, the court departed on 17 March for Troyes, where the peace with England was to be ratified. They crossed the bridge over the river Vanne, taking the night of 17 March at Villeneuve-l'Archevêque in a country house at which they would tarry for two days. The journey was then resumed, with lunch taken at a village called Saint-Liébault. On the road from here to Saint-Lyé, they were greeted by a troupe of satyrs and 'Indigenous Americans' riding donkeys and goats, led by a captain astride a 'unicorn', a nod to the current explorations of the New World that were being undertaken. Protestantism had never prospered well in Troyes, even with the conversion of the cities bishop to the Reformed creed. The city was under the stewardship of the duc de Nevers and his lieutenant Desbrosses, who were intensely Catholic, and whose soldiers had the populace kiss their rosaries. The Protestant pulpit had been burned here. On the morning of the royal entrance, the city was scouted by the constable de Montmorency, and his nephew the seigneur d'Andelot with a few companies. The city officials and inhabitants went out from the city to meet the king in the suburb of Saint-Martin. At their head, the companies of their militia, armed with dagger and sword. In the procession, more 'Indigenous Americans' were encountered, like those the court had seen on the road, their leader astride another 'unicorn', the others on donkeys, goats, and sheep. These 'Americans' were armed with bows, arrows and clubs. They proclaimed to Charles that his kingdom would surely grow, like that of Alexander, to encompass the New World. A troop of 'satyrs' unfurled a banner of the Roman goddess Diana. Burghers and merchants could be found dressed in the king's livery. The mayor, aldermen and councillors advanced towards the king. The bailli of Troyes made the presentation to the duc d'Aumale. Speeches followed, and then the officers remounted their horses, and made for the belfry gate of Troyes. On route to the city proper, Charles stopped off at the convent of Saint-Antoine for refreshments. The king then mounted a new steed to enter Troyes. Atop the gate, representations of Charlemagne, Minerva and Victory. There was also a triumphal arch. Charles was presented the keys of the city by the mayor. The mayor then delivered a harangue to the royal party. Inside the city, opposite the Trois Têtes inn, was to be found a scaffold, on which France was depicted, surrounded by her victories. Moving on to the place du Marché au blé, two pillars had been raised, with statues of Justice and Piety atop them, these concepts being Charles's mottoes. From here to the Quatre Vents, where a triumphal arch had been erected bearing Minerva, Pallas and Saint-Louis. Saint-Louis was a comparable figure for Charles, as that King too had begun his reign in a regency under the auspices of his mother, Blanche of Castile. At last, before the hôtel de ville, a second arch, bearing a pyramid, spoke to the loyalty of the inhabitants of Troyes to their king. Here, the daughter of the mayor, riding a chariot, gifted Charles a gold ring and heart, before reciting a quatrain. The king then went to the bishop's palace, while the queen mother and her entourage followed the king into Troyes. Catherine would be the beneficiary of a gift of Troyes linens, as well as local wines. Charles would receive a silver vase.

The next day, the people of Troyes came to Charles to plead with him on matters of justice. They begged for him to maintain them in the Catholic religion, something he assured them he would do. Twenty women then cried out for justice for the Protestants, complaining of the cruelties of the Catholics towards them on account of their Protestant faith. Charles turned to the duc d'Aumale and told him to remove the women and find out who had arranged their demonstration. It was determined it was the work of a Protestant of Paris, who was subsequently arrested. The procureur of Sens, Jacques Penon, also came to Troyes, as he had not had opportunity to deliver his complaints while the court was in Sens. The Protestants of Troyes drew up a list of their complaints concerning the murders, despoiling, and other crimes they had been subjected to, this was presented to the court by Pierre Pithou on 24 March. Pithou would not get to present them to Charles, and rather presented his petition to the duc d'Aumale. The Protestants of Champagne had been forced to wait three months before their complaints could be heard. They sought the amending of the site of their worship from Céant to a closer site to Troyes (Céant being almost 20 miles away). They enjoyed the sympathy of the princesse de Condé, but the location would not be amended. Pithou believed Charles to have been sympathetic to the Protestant complaints, but the effort would yield few fruits to the Protestants. According to the contemporary diarist of Provins, fr:Claude Haton, the Protestants of Provins also came before Charles while he was in Troyes. They sought to attain a place of worship in Provins by the terms of the edict of Amboise. Charles assented to this, ordering the président of Provins to provide an appropriate place for them, and see them protected against Catholic attacks. The président would ignore the grant, sending the Protestants away. In the hopes of illustrating his Catholic credentials, on the eve of Palm Sunday, 25 March, the king touched two hundred persons with scrofula] at Troyes Cathedral. On Maundy Thursday, he celebrate the Last Supper at the Bishop's Palace, with both he and the queen mother Catherine washing the feet of thirteen poor boys and girls respectively at whose table they served. Inside the city, the royal party celebrated an elaborate Easter, keen to see as much of the court abide by it Catholicly as possible. Nevertheless, the Protestants of the court, including Condé and the seigneur d'Andelot, held their own celebrations four leagues out from the city. Catherine hoped that by the king's celebration of Easter he would illustrate his Catholic credentials. The court at large had scrupulously observed Lent prior to Easter. Álava, the Spanish ambassador, was delighted by the devotion to Catholicism shown by Charles and Catherine. He was also the beneficiary of several types of gifted wines from the prince de La Roche-sur-Yon.

While the court was in Troyes, Catherine received notice from the seigneur de Lanssac, who had visited Spain, concerning Philip and her daughter Élisabeth. On the evening of 27 March, Andelot petitioned Catherine and Charles for permission to conduct Protestant worship in several towns of Champagne, as well as Nantes in Brittany. Catherine rebuffed Andelot's request, asserting that he was trying to assume the role of protector of the king's subjects, thereby usurping the position of her son. Andelot then appealed to his uncle, the constable de Montmorency, but he sided with Catherine, becoming heated when Andelot alluded to his advanced age. After having calmed down, the two men supped together. Unable to attain satisfaction on the matter of the right to select his own candidates as subordinate officers in his capacity as colonel-general of the French infantry, a prerogative the office typically enjoyed, Andelot departed the court. Charles gave warning to the judges of Troyes to step up their activities, or he would have them replaced. The royal intervention in the municipal electoral process of Troyes aroused protest. On Easter Tuesday (4 April), a great feast transpired in the hall of the palais royal. Both Charles and the court participated in ring races and sword fights in the gardens. The fight devolved into a brawl, with the footmen getting involved. A game of Barres which involved the royal children and other notable youths, saw the young prince de Béarn take a fall that required his bleeding. After this, boat rides were taken on the Trévois canal.

Peace was also finalised in the city with England, which was signed by Thomas Smith and Nicolas Throckmorton for the English, and the bishop of Orléans and secretary of state Bourdin for the French. Catherine had forged a bond with the English representative Throckmorton during their negotiations. The Spanish ambassador, Álava, was keen to pry on the French relations with England, but was informed by the English ambassador that it would not be appropriate, given the suspicions the French held. According to a report of Smith's, the Châtillon brothers, and the prince de Condé were entirely absent from the negotiations. By the terms of the treaty of Troyes, signed on 12 April 1564, the French reconquest of Le Havre the preceding year was ratified, as well as the 1558 conquest of Calais. In return for the permanent possession of Calais, an indemnity of 120,000 livres (pounds) was afforded. The hostages of the peace of Cateau-Cambrésis that had been in England were freed. This indemnity paled in comparison with the amount of English money that had been spent on the war, which totalled around eight times this sum. In addition to the financial costs, there had been the deaths in the defence of Le Havre, and the outbreak of plague which had been brought back to England. The treaty also had the effect of burying the alliance of the French Protestants with the English. Troyes represented a symbolic location for the French, the same place where the 1420 treaty of Troyes had been signed. The signing of this peace was an occasion for great celebration, with bonfires lit to commemorate it. In addition to burying the conflict between England and France, the treaty also opened the door to trade between English and French ports. From Troyes the court made for Châlons, where they stayed for five days.

A Protestant synod took place at La Ferté-sous-Jouarre on 27 April involving both the duc de Bouillon and the prince de Porcien. Catherine had heard rumour that the prince de Porcien, and his brother, were assembling men on his estates, and therefore the constable de Montmorency summoned him to join with the court so that he might explain himself, by an authoritarian letter of 31 March. Summoned, Porcien was able to clear his name. While the court was in Champagne, Porcien and the duc d'Aumale quarrelled.

Writing to the admiral de Coligny on 17 April, Catherine looked to assuage his fears about the failures of the authorities to implement the edict of Amboise. She noted this did not derive from her actions, or those of her son the king. They had made their view clear to local authorities, and indeed the purpose of the tour was to see the implementation of the edict. She expressed frustration that the Protestants believed the edict of Amboise was soon, at the moment when the court reached Lyon, to be abrogated. She argued that surely both the public and private declarations of the crown to the contrary should suffice to remove such fears.

While the court was in Champagne in April, Catholic petitioners from Nantes attempted to see Protestant worship excluded from the suburbs of their city. Petitioners who had grievances relating to Burgundy were deferred until the court arrived in that province. Protestant petitioners seeking a re-allocation of their site of worship in the Vermandois were at first rebuffed, and then when they returned two weeks later with a more specific request, sent back to the local officials.

Before the court's departure from the Île de France, Montmorency had expressed hesitancy about the prospect of the court's passage into Lorraine. He felt it was not proper for the king to travel somewhere in which he did not enjoy a preponderance of force. Thus, he proposed ten thousand soldiers accompanying the sovereign. The Habsburg's were similarly unnerved by the prospect, well recalling that Henri II had come to Lorraine in 1552 at the head of an ary.

As the court made its way to Bar-le-Duc, it passed through a host of villages: Saint-Sépulcre, Arcis-sur-Aube, Poivres, Dommartin, and Ecury-sur-Côle, before reaching Châlons on 20 April. Here, the court stayed for five days. At Châlons, Charles resolved a dispute over the readmission of the Protestant councillors of the city to their offices, ruling in their favour. On 26 April, Charles took the night at a little house in the place of Le May, then the court made an entry into Vitry-le-François on 27 April. The royal entourage tarried in Vitry for two days before moving on. Lunching at Bignicourt-sur-Saulx the court took the night at Sermaize, on the cusp of the territories of the duchy of Lorraine. The next day, the court took their lunch at the village of Fains before progressing onwards to Bar-le-Duc.

== Lorraine ==
=== Bar-le-Duc ===
The royal entry into Bar transpired on 1 May. Unusually, Catherine made her entry into the city two hours before the king. The mother of the duc de Lorraine, Christina made her entry into Bar on 6 May, the court had travelled out to meet her, finding her of a discontent disposition. Charles dismounted to greet the dowager duchess. Álava, for his part, looked to sooth Christina. On 7 May, Catherine bore witness to the baptism of her first grandchild, by her daughter the duchesse de Lorraine, Claude, the future duc de Lorraine Henry. The French king holding his nephew at the baptismal font. Catherine was the babies godmother, and king Charles and Philip II the child's godfather. Philip was not present so was represented by the Protestant Prussian count of Mansfeld who had a history with the constable de Montmorency dating back to the Italian Wars. Mansfeld had arrived in a foul mood, complaining neither a representative of the duc de Lorraine or Charles had come to meet him, and he had to be calmed by Álava. During the ceremony, Álava presented Claude with the gift of a ring from king Philip, something she accepted happily. Catherine presented her daughter with the gift of a belt adorned with emeralds. The queen mother directed the cardinal de Lorraine to show her the child, and both she and Charles smiled for the infant. Catherine then turned to Álava, and explained to him that the prince de Condé would soon be joining them, a couple of days from now, as his wife was thought to be on the cusp of death. Catherine probed Álava as to his opinions on the prince de Condé, to which the ambassador darkly replied that he was plotting harm towards the king, and he would not come to court until he had secured assurances from Catherine.

During the stay at Bar-le-Duc Charles enjoyed an interview with the duc de Lorraine, with whom he was on strong personal terms despite a dispute over the Barrois territory. The Barrois consisted of two parts, one, with a capital at Bar-le-Duc which was in vassalage to the French crown, the other with a capital at Saint-Mihiel held by the duc de Lorraine in full sovereignty. Alongside these more serious discussions, eight days of masquerades, tournaments and festivities were enjoyed. The English ambassador, Thomas Smith, came to Bar-le-Duc to offer queen Elizabeth's complements, and the English royal Order of the Garter (the senior order of English chivalry). Charles declared that he put great value on his relationship with Elizabeth, and if women were permitted entry into the Order of Saint-Michel, he would surely induct Elizabeth.

While in Bar-le-Duc, Charles devoted himself primarily to hunting, turning down a diplomatic audience on that account, he left the conduct of politics to his mother and council. At a tournament, the constable de Montmorency praised the fighting prowess of the recently arrived prince de Condé, to which the Spanish ambassador mournfully responded that the prince fought only for evil. Montmorency laughed in agreement, before quizzing the ambassador as to his thoughts concerning Condé. Álava demurred, noting he had already given his opinion to the queen mother, and did not wish to repeat it. In a masquerade held in the town during the courts stay, stars danced in orderly fashion, as a representation of cosmic harmony. Learning of the condition of his wife, to whom Catherine had already dispatched her physician, Condé left court for Roye. He was joined at his wife's bedside by the admiral de Coligny and seigneur d'Andelot who came to the dying woman. She died on 23 July.

On 9 May, the court departed from Bar-le-Duc. Shortly after the departure, one of Catherine's ladies-in-waiting, Isabelle de Limeuil gave birth to a son of the prince de Condé. This was quickly reported to the queen mother. Catherine ordered the affair be kept quiet, and she was frustrated Álava had already reported it back to Philip. Condé was quick to recognise the child, which had been sent to him in a basket, and would not abandon them. The comte de Maulévrier accused Isabelle of attempting to poison the prince de La Roche-sur-Yon, who was husband to Philippes de Montespedon (Catherine's première dame d'honneur who strictly governed the Queen's ladies-in-waiting.) Sometime between 22 May and 29 May Isabelle was arrested. She accompanied the court as a prisoner before being placed in the cordeliers convent at Auxonne. Here on 16 June, she was interrogated on the charges of attempted poisoning, something Isabelle denied. She stated that Maulévrier had slandered her, and that the prince de La Roche-sur-Yon was a brute who watched her inappropriately. It was true enough that she hated him, but she had never attempted to harm him. While imprisoned in the convent, Isabelle painted devotional images, and corresponded by letter with her supporters, including the prince de Condé. Condé wrote passionately concerning his devotion to Isabelle. He gave assurances to Isabelle concerning the robust health of their child. Isabelle was uneasy about her fate, and begged Condé to intercede with Catherine on her behalf. She would still be a prisoner of the court at the time of its residency in the house of Tournon, then in Vienne. Released, she would rendezvous with Condé while the court was passing through the Bourbonnais in early April 1566. Arriving in disguise, she demanded that the prince de Condé marry her. Condé, who had remarried, jettisoning his assurances of undying love for her, nevertheless gave her a warm welcome but advised she return to her home. She would go on to marry the banker Scipion Sardini.

The court would spend the night of 9 May at Ligny-en-Barrois. On 10 May, the court passed through Tréveray and followed the course of the river Ornain, arriving at Gondrecourt on 11 May. This was Ascension day, so a feast was held in the village. The next day the court departed Gondrecourt, lunching at Lezéville and finishing the day at Reynel.

== Champagne ==
=== Langres ===
The fort of Monteclaire fired a salvo as the court came by. The king made an entry into Chaumont-en-Bassigny. On 15 May the court continued their progress towards Langres, taking lunch at the village of Rolampont and arriving in the city in the evening. Langres was a strongly Catholic city. 6,000 of the populace, under arms, came out to meet the king. Entering the place, the court could see two women dressed in garlands to represent the fertility of the Meuse and Marne rivers that blessed the city. Salvos of cannons were fired as the aldermen greeted the king. A procession of the clergy accompanied the king to the episcopal church. Charles observed the relics of the city, the fortifications of the walls, and affirmed the privileges of the city. The Protestants of Langres had no luck in appealing for the right to worship there, having to content themselves with the duc d'Aumale's granting of Villeneuve-le-Roi for their worship. Langres also maintained the exclusive prerogatives of Catholics to enjoy the offices of mayor and aldermen. It was while the court was at Langres, that those princes who had steered clear of the court on its journey into Lorraine greeted the king. Lodgings were prepared for the prince de Condé, but he was absent. In Álava's opinion, Condé was awaiting the arrival of the queen of Navarre to present to the queen mother the result of a recent Protestant meeting. The court made its departure from Langres, lunching in Longeau and taking the night at the town of Selongey. Come 17 May the court spent lunch at Thil-Châtel, ending the day at the village of Gemeaux.

== Burgundy ==
=== Dijon ===
On 19 May, the court took their lunch at Messigny before travelling on to terminate the day at the Charterhouse of Dijon (Champmol). The royal children resided here, the burial place of the Valois dukes of Burgundy. The delay of the court here allowed the city of Dijon to prepare the royal entry. The king received communion alongside the duc d'Orléans and prince de La Roche-sur-Yon, while Catherine took hers separately. The streets of Dijon were cleaned for the royal arrival to avoid the possibility of contagion. Catherine hoped to watch the king's entry from the place Saint-Jean, and a house had thus been prepared for her here. Catherine preferred not to lodge with the king, and thus the lieutenant-general of Burgundy, the seigneur de Tavannes had yielded his residence for her. Tavannes came out a league from the city to greet Charles. Giving no speech, he rested his hand on his heart, saying it belonged to the king, he then rested his hand on his sword, indicating this was what he could do in service of the king. For the entry of 22 May, elaborate arches were raised, adorned with sculpted figures. Small children, in the royal colours, played instruments. A mystery play had been prepared, as well as a gift for the king fashioned by the city's goldsmiths, a silver cup embossed with a depiction of the baptism of Clovis, Clotilde and Saint-Remi. Tournaments were put on by the seigneur de Tavannes. A mock assault on a fortress by royal artillery was displayed for the royal party. Four cannons battered the walls, opening a breach. Enjoying a private conversation with Catherine, Tavannes advised her to only appoint advisors who were dependant on she and her son.

Acting in the name of the king, on 23 May, the duc d'Orléans sent for the registers of the parlement of Dijon, and information concerning the municipal authority of the city from the lieutenant-general Tavannes. A lit de justice (a special session of the parlement over which the king presided) was held before the parlement of the city on 24 May. This was the first of several lit de justices held during the tour, and would be the first the parlements of the kingdom outside of Paris had played host to. The bodies went to great expense to receive the king for this event, and the harsh tone of the crown towards them in the speeches that followed was greeted with awkward silence. Charles took the moment to see the parlement register the edict of Amboise without amendment, the court's May 1563 registration having added a clause which declared Protestant worship to still be illegal in the parlements jurisdiction. In L'Hôpital's appearance before the body, he put every recent case the court had concluded under the microscope, to ensure they were acting within the bounds of their authority.

=== Chalon ===
On 27 May, having lunched at Longecourt, the court crossed the Saône so that they might spend time at the château of the comte de Charny in Pagny. Here they tarried for two days, in feasting and celebrations. From Pagny, the court passed through Seurre and Saunières-sur-Doubs before crossing the tributary of the Saône by boat and passing the night at Senecey. The court followed the course of the Saône taking lunch at Saint-Maura, before arriving in Chalon on the evening of 31 May, where the king made an entrance. After several days in Chalon, the court embarked on a boat provided them by the gentlemen of Lyon and followed the river down to Mâcon on 3 June.

=== Mâcon ===
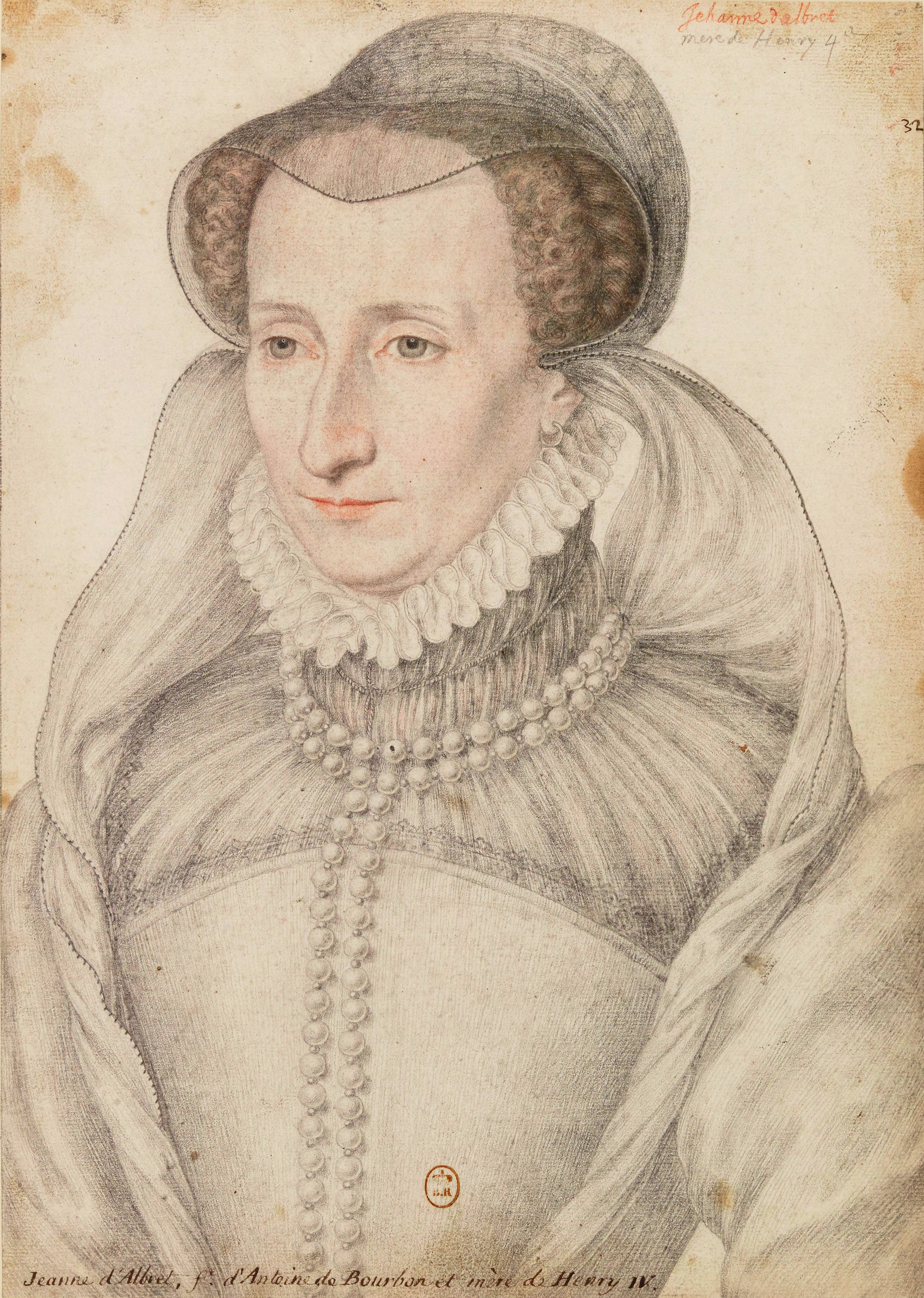
Jeanne d'Albret, queen of Navarre and mother of Henry IV of France at that time the prince de Béarn

The seigneur de Tavannes justified the fact that the city of Mâcon had not disarmed with the coming of peace on the grounds that here the Loire and Saône rivers were to be found very close to one another (i.e. it was a potential choke point), in addition to the sensitive border nature of the place. Though Catherine had recently defended the queen of Navarre before the Papacy, Jeanne had little inclination towards moderation. She had arrived a few days in advance of the royal party. On 1 June, her servants derided the Corpus Christi procession led by her brother-in-law the cardinal de Bourbon as it charted its path through the streets. This was a joint indignity to the Bourbon family and to Catholicism. Those households that did not participate in the procession, came to the queen of Navarre's household, where she hosted a Protestant service. In the queen of Navarre's entourage, were eight Protestant ministers, and three hundred horse, it would be in Mâcon that she united with the French court. The night before entering the city, the king supped at the town of Pont-de-Veyle. It was flanked by her Protestant ministers that the queen of Navarre greeted the king upon his entry into Mâcon on 3 June. Mâcon had prepared for the royal entry into their city by drawing up a list of twenty-six parishes, each of which selected two of their inhabitants to deliberate. Only Catholics were involved in this deliberation process. The city would take out a loan for the occasion, one that still burdened the place eighteen years later. For the event, young girls in sky blue dresses representing the nymphs of the Saône and hills of Mâcon sung verse. The cardinal de Bourbon apprised Catherine of what had transpired in the preceding days. Catherine was keenly aware she enjoyed the company of the Spanish ambassador and thus could not be indifferent in this matter. Further, she had recently devoted herself to the defence of the queen of Navarre against Papal attacks, assuring them she no longer warranted punishment. Catherine arranged for a new procession on 8 June, to which the queen of Navarre was to be party. In contrast to their previous performance, the Navarrese party acted respectfully to this procession, much to the delight of the Spanish ambassador, who was with Catherine for its course. Catherine also looked to see the prince de Béarn and Jeanne returned to the Catholic fold, but this was met with less success.

The Spanish ambassador Álava had requested an audience with Catherine on the day of the royal entry into Mâcon. She accepted the offer for the following day. Álava recorded a very favourable audience, in which he was showered with affection by the queen mother and king, who promised him he would soon see religious affairs to his likely in the kingdom of France. Catherine is to have inquired of him as to the meaning of the Spanish soldiers mustering and was relieved to hear their goal was for an African campaign. Catherine offered to the Spanish receipt of the relics of Saint-Eugène, which were then kept at the Basilica of Saint-Denis. This would have to be done covertly, with neither the Protestants (who might toss them into the river) or Catholics catching wind of it. Receipt of this relic was a great ambition for Philip, who had tasked don Manrique de Lara with travelling to France to see to its acquisition. He had also tasked Álava with negotiating with Catherine on the topic. The deal would not be struck at this moment. In December, Manrique de Lara reported from Toulouse on the opposition of the cardinal de Lorraine to the plan. For Catherine, it was a useful diplomatic pawn. By February 1565, Catherine had consented to the transfer, but the cardinal de Lorraine appealed for the need of a Papal brief.

== Lyonnais ==
=== Lyon ===
After supper on 8 June, the constable de Montmorency advanced ahead of the royal party to Lyon, bringing with him an imposing military force. He took over the towers and the artillery of the Protestant dominated city, facing no resistance. Taking the keys of Lyon, he established a royal garrison in the city. During the court's time in Lyon, it would be resolved to build a citadel in the city's heights. Catherine promised not to depart Lyon without leaving royal soldiers in the city. Lyon had enjoyed both Protestant and Catholic worship within its walls since 1563. Before the court entered Lyon, the Protestants were ordered to vacate the Cordeliers chapel they had occupied in the city. Protestant sermons were forbidden while the king was in the city. Some Protestants who were feistier were arrested and branded. The court at large departed from Mâcon on 9 June.

From Mâcon on 9 June the court made for Lyon by boat, stopping at the Île Barbe a little upriver of the city. On Easter Monday, a crowd of dancers from Lyon filled the island. The next day Charles responded to an invitation from the maréchal de Vielleville, before returning by boat to the Île Barbe in the evening to pass the night there. It was necessary to show strength to both the Protestants and Catholics of Lyon, while reassuring the cities merchant population. This was the mission Vielleville undertook. Charles and Catherine privately visited Lyon incognito on 12 June, with the king lodging at the rue Saint-Jean.

The formal Royal entry would go ahead on 13 June. In an address to the young King, the monarch was analogised as a new Josiah, who would restore the ruins of Israel after the troubles if civil war that it had suffered through. For Charles would put himself between the two factions. The court was greeted by pairs of children, one Catholic one Protestant in each pair, holding hands as they marched in procession. To distinguish the Catholic children, they wore crosses of precious stones or pearls in their caps. The various Italian communities of the city made their appearances in this parade. First the Luccans advancing in pairs, greeted the royal court in the Italian style, with Muslim pages. The Florentines, dressed in black velvet, accompanied by footmen wearing satin. The Milanese too wore black velvet. The German's black taffeta with yellow satin adorned footmen. The officers of the city were also there: the grand prévôt (grand provost) with his company, the prévôt des sergents (sergeant provost) and his company, the officers of justice and guards. The burghers of Lyon too came by. First the king, then Orléans then the prince de Béarn entered the city through the Vaise gate, the latter dressed in elaborate fabrics. This pageantry was to the distaste of the queen of Navarre, as was the recent recognition by Béarn's uncle, the prince de Condé, of his bastard son by the dame de Limeuil. Behind Béarn, the cardinal de Bourbon, the prince de La Roche-sur-Yon, the duc de Nemours and duc d'Aumale. The archers of the royal guard brought up the rear of the royal party. At the Vaise gate were to be found allegorical statues for philosophy and reading. The entry into Lyon was a triumphal one, trumpets accompanying the royal passage through the Vaise gate. The cannons of the fortress of Saint-Jean thundered for the occasion. These guns were answered by those of the château de Pierre-Size. Having passed through the gate, Charles was greeted by the aldermen of Lyon. A two-tiered portal displayed the virtues of Justice and Piety as nymphs vanquishing the decrepit body of Discord. At the roc de Bourgneuf, a theatre had been erected in which Apollo address the king with verse. The nine muses offered an invocation to orchestral accompaniment. Crossing the rue de Bourg-neuf, which had been covered with satin to shield it from the sun, another theatre stood which played host to the allegory of Cerberus. On the rue du Bourg-Neuf, the king saw a display in which a Virgin bearing a golden ruler and sword addressed Charles that she would place the sword in his arm so that he might rule with a just and strong arm. Moving on to the pont Saint-Jean, a painting was to be admired, then at the Grand Palais, a temple of virtues. Here, the virtues were young girls acting as living statues. The royal coat of arms hung there, with the motto "One God, One king, One Justice" below a Medici bezant. The procession terminated at Lyon Cathedral. The king entered this place before returning to the archbishop's palace, which would serve as his residence for his stay in Lyon.

For the arrival of the king in Lyon, Protestant worship in the city was prohibited. So that it would not seem like Lyon was receiving a special prohibition, Charles declared on 24 June that wherever the court travelled during the tour, Protestant worship was to be suspended for the duration of their stay. Marriages and baptisms could take place at the nearest available settlement. Mariéjol sees the source of this new declaration in the Protestant episode of the queen of Navarre at Mâcon. Le Roux argues this measure was intended to avoid disturbances interfering with the royal travels around the kingdom.

The prohibition on Protestant worship frustrated the Protestant community of Lyon, which demanded of Catherine the right to conduct their services. Without even letting them finish, Catherine threatened hanging for those that violated the king's order on the matter. With Protestant worship prohibited in buildings, Jeanne took her son (the prince de Béarn) to an open-air Protestant service in protest. However, her influence over her son was fading, and she was sequestered. Jeanne feared for her son's soul in such an 'adulterous environment'. Their attendance of the open-air Protestant service put the queen of Navarre in trouble with the crown, Catherine enjoying a brusque interview with Jeanne on 9 July. In this interview, Jeanne requested right to withdraw from the court to her lands, and to take her son, the prince de Béarn with her. Catherine refused her both propositions, prohibiting the queen of Navarre from withdrawing to Béarn. Rather she was to depart for the Vendôme, a fief more distant from Spain, and one in which she was only a duchesse rather than sovereign ruler. This bitter result was softened by the granting of a 150,000 livres gratuity to the queen. She would not immediately leave the court. The dames d'honneur (ladies-in-waiting) of Catherine were prohibited from frequenting Jeanne's apartments, out of concern that she might convert them to Protestantism. In the hopes of hiding her disgrace, Jeanne departed for Vendôme on the grounds of an illness on 14 August. When the duchess of Ferrara, Renée, appeared before Catherine and Charles to speak of Protestantism, Catherine acted with considerable firmness, noting that all French Kings had, and would remain Catholic. The duchess' conscience should compel her to support Charles in word and deed. Renée was left in tears after this encounter, while the maréchal de Bourdillon applauded Catherine. The baron des Adrets visited Lyon so that he might defend the rights of Protestant places of worship. An awkward episode arose after he found his way into Charles' chambers, to the latter confusion. Then, the son of the late seigneur de La Motte-Gondrin, who had been lynched by Adret's Protestant bands during the civil war entered, and proposed the king fight the baron des Adrets in front of him. Both men were ushered out. At a village near Châlon, a dispute arose over the conduct of Protestant worship. Around twenty Protestants were killed by the Catholics in this affair. The duc d'Aumale brought word of this event to the French court in Lyon.

While in Lyon, Catherine and Charles visited the various churches and monasteries of the area. Catherine would also participate in a Vespers service. According to the contemporary memoirist, the seigneur de Mauvissière, proposals were made to the queen mother while the court was in Lyon to resume the war against Protestantism such that the whole kingdom might be brought into the Catholic fold. While in Lyon the king's sister, Marguerite, informed the Spanish ambassador Álava that she had rooted through the things of her brother Orléans, and found no hint of heretical inclinations.

The young prince de Béarn was presented to the royal ambassadors as the fr:premier prince du sang (first prince of the royal blood - closest agnatic relative to the royal family).

Diplomatic undertakings at the city transpired in relation to the peace that had been concluded in Troyes in April. An extraordinary English ambassador who had come to Lyon for the occasion, the baron Hunsdon, presented Charles IX with his collar (a necklace worn by members) of the Order of the Garter on 22 June, in a ceremony presided over by the constable de Montmorency. Charles had dispatched the seigneur de Gonnor to England to present Elizabeth with the Order of Saint-Michel in turn. The cardinal de Bourbon presented the prince de Béarn to the English ambassador, who received him with an embrace. Béarn was then carried to the king's chambers. On 23 June, the English ambassador was invited to the French royal council. On 24 June, the extraordinary baron Hunsdon was led to the Saint-Jean church by the prince de La Roche-sur-Yon. The ordinary English ambassador Thomas Smith was led by the duc de Nevers. The king, who was already in the church, rose at their approach, took the gospels from the cardinal de Bourbon and pronounced the oath of peace at the altar. Hunsdon likewise made the oath. A Te Deum rang out and trumpets blared. The English ambassadors were then invited to the table of the king for a meal. On 25 July, Hunsdon was present for the king's lévee (ceremonial morning rising) and enjoyed the honour of handing the king his shirt and staying by his side as he dressed. Simultaneously to this, the ordinary ambassador Smith discussed matters of the peace with several of the French secretaries of state. That evening, the cardinal de Guise played host to the English ambassadors for a meal attended by Charles and his sister Marguerite. The next day, it was the governor Vielleville's turn to play host for the ambassador's meal. After an abortive attempt at a walk outside the city, which was ruined by the weather, the ambassador Smith ate dinner with Charles, Catherine, the duc d'Orléans, and Marguerite. Considering the application of the edict of Amboise, the English ambassador Smith felt it was more in force than it was violated at this time.

The Papal nuncio, Santacroce was similarly optimistic at this time. Writing to cardinal Borromeo on 21 June, he argued that Catherine was taking a piecemeal approach to introducing the Tridentine decrees in France, such that the Protestants would not be given an excuse to assume arms. The Nuncio Santacroce arranged a dialogue between the prominent Protestant pastor Viret (who he believed had promised him to renounce Protestantism if he could be convinced of their error) and a prominent Jesuit, Antonio Possevino of the city which transpired in the presence of the Venetian ambassador. The debaters left one another's company in good humour, with Viret expressing that he hoped to continue another day, with others of his faith. The Nuncio was of the opinion that another Colloquy might follow (like that of Poissy in 1561). He was cautious as to whether it would have good results though. Santacroce believed Catherine even more optimistic than he, seeing Viret as converted, and liable to bring the Protestant population of Lyon with him back into the Catholic fold. Regardless, the breaking out of plague frustrated any plans for continuing discussions in Lyon.

On 30 June, the duke of Savoy visited Lyon with his wife, Catherine's sister-in-law Margaret. This couple had been received by Charles and Catherine at Miribel, a little way out from Lyon. Catherine and Margaret were for a time overcome with emotion, unable to speak to one another. In Álava's opinion, Margaret was a friend of Protestantism. While this meeting was an emotional moment for Catherine, she nevertheless rebuffed the duke of Savoy's attempt to see Pinerolo and Savigliano restored to his possession. Despite his militant Catholicism, the duke of Savoy opposed the expulsion of the Protestant Pierre Viret from Lyon as he was conducting negotiations with the Swiss Canton of Bern at this time. Savoy was to content himself with being granted the captaincy of 50 men-at-arms. The duke of Savoy also had negotiations to conduct with the duc de Nemours, who wished to see his Savoyard apanage expanded. Catherine favoured Nemours in these negotiations, and they ultimately bore fruit for Nemours.

Charles had to suspend additions to the royal council during June 1564, as the body was becoming too large. The king also undertook negotiations with the grand parti of Lyon (from whom the French crown had undertaken a loan consolidation during the reign of Charles' father).

Around the end of June, 2,000 soldiers were raised for Lyon, this was done without the duc de Nemours who did not want responsibility for such an order without a sufficient garrison already in place. Trustworthy individuals were looked to for the garrisoning of nearby châteaux. Damville was invited to come to Lyon, but he declined.

The Lyon residence was also the occasion for festivities. These sometimes took place on the waters. The château of the banker Thomas de Gadagne in Beauregard was visited, it was here that the duc d'Orléans was housed. Similarly, the château of the du Perron, home to the banker Albisse del Bene, played host to dinners. Other bourgeois were also frequented, such as Pierre Teste, a spice merchant of wealth with whom Charles stayed. Fencing matches, dances and 'feats of skill' were also seen in Lyon during the royal visit.

== Dauphiné ==
=== Crémieu ===
The plague was active in Lyon, and thus the court withdrew from the city early, departing for the nearby place of Crémieu, in Dauphiné on 8 July. Rumour swirled that the plague was a product of the Protestants, and had been brought into Lyon from Basel. To counteract the plague, measures were established on 3 July concerning the disposal of bodies, hospitalisation of the ill, and the burning of clothes. A cleanup of Lyon was undertaken, with the Lyonnais advised on how to draw their water from the river proper, and see spoiled food thrown into the Saône. Soon the dead were too numerous to be buried. There were only five 'master surgeons' in the city who were overwhelmed by the needs of the moment. Around a third of the houses in Lyon had to be closed because of the plague. Champion states that 25,000 were killed by the plague in total. The constable gave order that Protestant preaching was not take place in Lyon in the queen mother's absence from the city, but this was violated, with services occurring in five or six places.

In the edict of Crémieu, issued on 12 or 14 July, Charles made it law that the elections of aldermen, mayors and jurats would now be undertaken in duplicate, so that the king himself might select the most suitable ones from the electoral list. This applied to any town that was the seat of a bishopric or archbishopric, or that had a parlement or présidial court. Pernot points to this edict as an illustration of how well understood it was by the royal council that the factions of the kingdom looked to gain municipal control. Indeed, the chancellor L'Hôpital was well aware that almost half of the 'good towns' (bonne villes) of the kingdom had fallen to the Protestants during the prior civil war.

=== Roussillon ===
From Crémieu, the court followed the Rhône river southwards. They passed through the villages of Heyrieux and Septème, before arriving at Roussillon on 17 July. Here, it was ordered that the citadel be rebuilt, and a garrison of 400 men installed. The maréchal de Vielleville was replaced in his charge at Lyon by a certain Catholic ultra named de Losses. Around this time, a panic spread among the Protestants, that the French crown intended an attack against Geneva. Against this rumour, a letter from the French Protestants counselled Geneva to raise Swiss soldiers. German landsknechts were also recruited, in the hopes they would intimidate Catherine. The court lingered in Roussillon for thirty days, staying in the residence erected by the cardinal de Tournon. It was while here, on 9 August, that Charles signed an ordinance moving the start of the year from Easter to 1 January, as well as other elements complimenting the edict of January 1564 that had been issued before the royal departure on tour. The establishment of the start of the year as 1 January had first been part of the edict of Paris from January 1564, which comprised thirty-nine articles. The parlement of Pars would not recognise the new year start until 1567. An interpretive declaration on the edict of Amboise would also be issued from Roussillon that placed more restrictions on Protestantism. This aroused great upset among the Protestants, who compiled an advertissement to protest the changes the following year, with a letter as a foreword from the prince de Condé. While the court was in Roussillon, a petition was delivered from the Protestant nobility of Maine. Over fifty-six pages, the Protestants complained of the various abuses and indignities they were subjected to by the Catholics, including murder and the desecration of corpses. Religious motives for the perpetrators of these outrages did not feature in the text, with the focus on base financial and sexual drives. Holt questions whether everything the Protestants complained of can be taken as fact. Finally, the court departed Roussillon, on 15 August.

At some point between the departure from Lyon and the courts arrival in Valence, the duc d'Anjou was sent back to Paris due to become very sickly. The nine-year-old was accompanied by several guards and secretaries. In a letter he (or rather a secretary on his behalf) wrote to the maréchal de Montmorency on route, he mentioned having departed from Roussillon. He wished to assure the latter of his good health, and that he would soon be spending much time with both his sister (Marguerite) and Montmorency.

Catherine had hoped to use the courts time in Dauphiné to facilitate an interview with the king of the Romans, Maximilian, however this would not come to pass.

Some advised Catherine around this time to cease the tour and return to the capital, so that she might reestablish order there.

The seigneur de Damville, governor of Languedoc, fancied that he might establish himself as the new leader of the Catholic party in France. Sometime around early August 1564, he met with the Spanish ambassador, Álava, indicating to him that he was frustrated by his lack of advancement and could establish himself in opposition. In particular he was vexed that he had not yet been made a maréchal of France. Álava was happy to form a line of communication with him, but in relation to his specific grievances referred him to the advice of his father, the constable de Montmorency.

The seigneur de Lanssac, who had been with the royal party, but departed for Guyenne, wrote to the queen mother on the state of affairs he had observed in his travels on 28 July. He painted a sorry picture of the areas he had made his passage through but urged Catherine to continue with the royal tour of the kingdom.

The court was dissuaded from visiting Grenoble and its parlement by the plague which was active there.

From Roussillon, the court continued its journey southwards towards Provence on 15 August. The court took their lunch at Agnin and rested at Jarcieu. Then, on 16 August, Châteauneuf-sur-Isère was traversed arriving at the end of the day at the city of Romans. A royal entry would be made into Romans. Here they stayed only six days as the party was stalked by the plague they had first encountered in Lyon. As a precaution on this front, doctors accompanied the court.

On 21 August, the court received a petition from the Protestants of Toulouse.

Negotiations were undertaken with Imperial towns in August which culminated in an agreement for the repayment of loans taken out from German merchants.

In an audience with the Spanish ambassador Álava on 23 August, Catherine expressed her concerns about the health of her daughter, who was then pregnant in Spain. The conversation then moved on to matters of the Catholic religion in France. Álava informed Catherine that Philip was pleased by the firmness that Catherine was showing. Álava expressed sadness that her good work had meant he had been unable to provide much service to Philip himself. The discussion then moved on to matters of international diplomatic concern (the theft of Álava's ciphers and Corsican affairs). Álava was of the opinion around this time, that the admiral de Coligny was mustering horsemen for a planned seizure of Paris, just as the Protestants had seized Orléans in 1562.

Eating at the table of the constable de Montmorency on 27 August, the grandee assured Álava that he was working day and night to see Catholicism re-established as the kingdom's sole religion. This was the occasion of a sarcastic remark from Álava, who suggested he could achieve such a thing without so much effort. Holding such an important office, he could, with Catherine, invite Philip to resolve religious matters in France. The Constable could also cast out his nephews, who were wicked 'heretics'. Montmorency defended himself as powerless against the influence of the queen of Navarre, duchess of Ferrara, and duchess of Savoy on Catherine. As for his nephews, he considered them heretical traitors. He noted that if his sons were Protestants like his nephews, he would disinherit them.

Come 28 August, the Constable went to Catherine and assured her that she could carry him in high confidence as he would serve her faithfully.

The duchess of Savoy complained to Catherine that her husband had threatened her if she did not recant her Protestant sympathies. Catherine in turn voiced her displeasure to a representative of the duke, named Morette. Charles joined in, noting that he would always esteem the duke of Savoy so long as he treated his aunt well. Morette noted that it was good that Charles esteemed the duke of Savoy on account of his marriage to Margaret, but suggested Charles also had other reasons to hold Savoy in high regard.

On 28 August, the court received a petition from the Protestants of Aigues-Mortes presented by a certain La Faye and Cottin. This was followed by a petition from those Protestants of the bailliage of Velay three days subsequently.

=== Valence ===
Crossing the Isère from Romans, the court arrived in Valence, where the king made another entry. Conscious of the plague, the prince de La Roche-sur-Yon had been sent ahead to undertake various health measures (the boarding up of the houses of the sick, the clearing of the streets, and the appointment of medical officials). For the entry, allegorical figures lifted from mythology and paganism greeted the royal party. A representation of the fame of the Valois blew a trumpet. From a rock, a maiden presented the keys of the city. Fame gave praise to Charles, as an observer of the laws. Atop the city gate, the Gemini steered the allegorical ship of state, which was in peril. In the place aux hommes, Theseus could be found. The figure of Prudence represented Catherine, who was also analogised to Minerva. A representation of the Minotaur and Daedalus was made to show the triumph of the king over internal disorders. The king's brother, the duc d'Orléans, was a source of admiration for the populace of Valence, on account of his grace and bearing. The poet whose account informs us of the royal entry into Valence analogised the prince de La Roche-sur-Yon, governor of Dauphiné as well as Valence, to a Roman Caesar. The city gifted him six barrels of wine, and the chancellor two.

While in Valence, on 5 September, the court received a petition from the Protestants of the Bordelais, protesting at their treatment contrary to the edict of Amboise. This petition argued against the mayors, aldermen and magistrates of the Bordelais. In addition to these local officials, private individuals inspired by their vexatious conduct were also the subject of complaint. They sought, if not complete parity in the division of holding of public offices between Catholics and Protestants, then at least entry to these offices being entirely confessionally neutral. They further wished not to have to swear on the arms of Saint-Antoine in court. Their pleas were answered in the form of royal letters patent, with the seigneur de Monluc, and seigneur de Burie ordered to put things right. During the courts stay in this city, the militantly Catholic lieutenant-general of Dauphiné, Louis de Maugiron was replaced by the more amenable baron de Gordes. Before leaving Valence, nine knights were enrolled into the Order of Saint-Michel. The court would spend six days in the village of L'Estoile. Crossing the Drôme, Charles would enter Loriol and Dherbierres before entering Montélimar on 14 September. The court cooled its heels here for four days. Donzère was reached on 19 September, then the next day Pierrelatte was crossed with the court arriving in La Garde-Adhémar for lunch. This was the location of the château of the captain La Garde. From here they made their final Dauphinois stop at Saint-Paul-Trois-Châteaux.

== Papal states ==
=== Comtat Venaissin ===
On 21 September, the court entered Provence through Suze-la-Rousse, where they paused to participate in the baptism of the comte de Suze's daughter, the king and queen mother holding her at the baptismal font. The child was given the name Charlotte. From Suze the court left for the village of Bollène, a bastide of Avignon in the Comtat Venaissin. On 22 September both Mondragon and the principality of Orange were passed through, with the night spent at Caderousse in the latter, the place offering the French king an entry. Orange had been a Protestant centre, but suffered a rough sacking during the first civil war. On 23 September, back in the Comtat Venaissin, Charles passed the night at the village of Sorgues, and it was here that the keys of Avignon were presented to him by several bourgeois of the city and the vice-legate.

=== Avignon ===
Avignon was the sovereign possession of the Papacy and had been since 1348. The constable de Montmorency preceded the royal party into Avignon. Champion speculates the news of the arrival of the French court might have been greeted with apprehension, due to the possibility they might introduce plague into the city. Sufferers of scrofula made their way to Avignon, so that they might receive the royal touch. In the old Papal city, Charles was greeted by Pope Pius IV's nephew, Fabrizio Serbelloni, who served as the city's governor. He was fresh off hanging a Protestant and with much of the population having left the city due to fears of the plague, he ordered them back in to make the French royal party welcome. Charles and his entourage made their entry into Avignon on 23 September. Pausing before the chapel of Saint-Michel, speeches were given. Serbelloni, the Papal vice-legate and the consuls had come out of Avignon to greet Charles. Before the gate of Avignon, Charles kissed the cross presented to him by the vice-legate, promising to protect the Catholic religion. The consuls and two gentlemen carried a satin pall which bore fleurs-de-lys. Charles entered Avignon through the Saint-Ladre gate. A scaffold had been erected where the virtues were presented. A girl dressed in white satin, representing Truth, presented the keys that formed the Avignon coat of arms to Charles. Before the Augustinian gate figures represented the four seasons and a young child, who embodied Mercury, recited a quatrain. From here, the court arrived in the place de La Savonnerie where nine seats had been arranged for nine valiant knights. A child beckoned Charles to take a seat next to that of Godfrey of Bouillon, thereby making him the tenth valiant knight. In the place aux Changes a sea display had been arranged. A figure dressed as Neptune, riding a fish, assured Charles in the form of a quatrain that he would allow the king to rule over Africa and Asia. At the puits des bœufs in the place du palais a pyramid had been erected. From a cloud, a girl representing Justice emerged. From a mountain, representing the earth, another emerged, representing Truth. These two girls embraced. A representation of Peace then appeared, reciting a quatrain. The churches and convents of Avignon now proceeded before Charles. The king would enter the château, but not before entering the cathedral, dressed in the spurs of the valiant knight. On 25 September, the consuls and leading citizens of Avignon visited Charles at the château. He was then with his Mother and the princes. They hoped that Charles would use the powers invested in him by god to restore Christendom, something which would also resolve the problem of civil war. The sieur des Essarts gifted the king a golden cup, a medallion representing the city and an effigy. Charles gave thanks and assured them he would satisfy all. This was not the end of gifts to the royal party. Charles would also receive a sum of 200 écus, a tricoloured hat, and a camail (a helmet decoration) of diamonds and pearls which was worth 500 écus. The duc d'Orléans received a similar hat. Charles was very pleased by the hat and wore it to play tennis the next day.

The court was beset with strong winds while in Avignon, that flung walnut size pebbles through the air. The marquis d'Elbeuf, general of the galleys, presented himself to the court while it was in Avignon. The comte de Crussol and seigneur de Flassans jointly embraced the king, the two had a troubled history dating back to Crussol's 1561 mission to quiet the troubles in Provence. In royal council, the constable de Montmorency got into a spat with the comte de Crussol who had suggested that the 'ancient religion' was Protestantism, and that Catholicism was a false innovation. This enraged Montmorency, who demanded Crussol leave the council.

It was while here, in the cathedral (known in French as Notre-Dame-des-Doms) that the chapter meeting of the Order of Saint-Michel, the highest order of French chivalry was held on 28 September, in the presence of the duke and duchess of Savoy, the duke of Ferrara, the duc de Lorraine, the prince de La Roche-sur-Yon, the maréchal de Bourdillon, and the royal children. Empty seats were left for the king of Denmark and king of Spain. The knights of the order present wore the garb of the order, and the grand collar. Mass was overseen by the Vice-Legate. In the evening, a Vespers service was conducted for the dead. The next day, 29 September, the feast of Saint-Michel was celebrated. The duke of Savoy, irate that his precedence in the ceremony of 28 September had been below that of the prince de La Roche-sur-Yon, absented himself the following day on the pretext of illness.

Catherine enjoyed an interview with the Papal Legate here. Peace had never actually been made between the Protestants and the Papal authorities in this territory, the negotiations having fallen through in September 1563, shortly before Serbelloni led a reconquest of much of the Comtat. Charles's arrival allowed for the establishment of a peace deal with the Papacy by which Charles would take the Protestants of the Papal territories under his protection, these Protestants would have rights to their lands and their property, trade relations would be restored with the principality of Orange, and the principality of Orange would cease their invasions of Papal territory (and accept no overtures from the prince de Condé if they came). The practice of Protestantism would not be permitted in the Papal lands, but an amnesty would be afforded to all except for a few particularly violent cases.

On 5 October, the Protestants of Provence presented a petition to Charles. This had been formulated at a meeting in Salon on 19 August of that year. That same day, the Protestants of Montélimar also petitioned the crown.

René de Birague, governor of the Lyonnais, was able to come to a settlement with the duke of Savoy concerning French control of Pignerol. In return for the Duke renouncing his claim to the territory, he would receive a pension of 50,000 livres. It was almost time for the duke and duchess of Savoy to part ways with the French court. Gifts were exchanged in anticipation of their departure. Catherine looked to give her sister-in-law the jewels she had bought in Brissac which boasted an estimated value of 20,000 écus. For the duke, Charles gifted a habit of the Order of Saint-Michel. Álava reported that the duchess had started attending Mass, as her Protestant doctor had informed her it was acceptable to do so as long as you remained Protestant at heart. Speaking with her husband on religious matters she asserted that the greater part of their Savoyard subjects were Protestant and it was thus wrong to impose Catholicism across the population. In conversation with the Spanish ambassador, concerning Protestantism in Savoy, the duke of Savoy explained his inaction in analogy to that of a whaler, who tired out his prey before eliminating it.

In October, the duc de Nemours received a gift of 100,000 livres from Charles.

On 16 October, the court made its departure from Avignon, their planned expedition to Marseille having been delayed.

== Provence ==
According to Abel Jouan, throughout Provence, the court was greeted outside the towns by children dressed in white who cried "Long live the King and the Holy Mass".

=== Aix ===
Making from Avignon, the court crossed the river Durance on a boat bridge which had been lashed together at Château-Renard. Passing through Le Touret, the court was to be found in Salon-de-Provence which had been devastated by the plague. The inhabitants had fled and had to be summoned back to the city. They constructed simple archways from branches along the course from the Avignon gate to the château and sanded the streets for the royal party. Charles was greeted at the gate by the two consuls of Salon. While in Salon they met with the famous astrologer Nostradamus who regaled the royal family with his predictions, including one in which he claimed Charles IX would live to the age of the constable de Montmorency. Charles IX would die at 24, Montmorency at 75. Nostradamus was gifted a sum of 200 écus as well as the position of ordinary physician in the French royal household. From Salon to Lambesc on 19 October where Charles made an entry. From here, the court lunched at Saint-Jean-de-la-Sale before leaving for Aix which had a reputation for particularly virulent anti-Protestantism. Indeed, Charles had to order that a pine tree upon which many Protestants had been hanged be cut down on 21 October. Several thousand Protestants petitioned Charles for the right to worship according to the provisions of the edict of Amboise.

Before the city, Charles was greeted by the men of the cour des comptes (court of accounts), the first président of which gave the king's thigh a customary kiss. Entering the city, the king was greeted with cries of "Long live the King! Long live the Mass"'.

The cities Catholic reputation had previously led to the suspension of their parlement. That suspension was now lifted. The Parisian parlementaires who had been injected into the cities parlement to replace the ultra-Catholics were in the process of undertaking the prosecution of those Catholics who had in prior years perpetrated massacres. Those parlementaires who had persecuted the Protestants were dismissed from their offices. In addition to the lifting of this penalty, a bi-confessional chamber was established to handle disputes between Protestants and Catholics. According to Le Roux and Champion, a lit de justice session was held before the parlement on 23 October. Holt states by contrast that while a lit de justice was planned for Aix, it was cancelled at the last moment.

Champion reports on an incident at this time in which the chancellor, fearing a certain Catholic gentlemen desired to kill him, was menaced by said man in his home, alongside ten armed persons.

=== Toulon ===
Leaving Aix on 24 October, the court took their lunch in the village of Pourrières before stopping at Saint-Maximin for the night. The next day, the court passed through Sainte-Baume before leaving in the afternoon and arriving at Brignoles around 02:00 (thanks to the poor condition of the roads). As a result of this, the formal entrye was postponed until the following day. While in Brignoles, a dance would take place in the grand hall near the king's lodgings. The king watched the girls dance the Provençal martingale, and the event continued for a great many hours from 11:00 to 17:00. Leaving Brignolles on 28 October, the court passed through Garéoult to spend the night in the village of Cuers. On 29 October, the court entered orange growing country, and took their midday meal on the gallery of the château of a certain de Forbin before arriving in Hyères for the night. Having departed from Hyères, a small party of the court crossed the Maures mountains to Brégançon from where the islands the Ottomans sacked off the coast could be seen. The court then returned to Hyères for the night, and the celebration of All Saints' Day. The court moved next to Toulon, where they made the royal entry on 3 November, though they had arrived before this time informally. At Toulon, the marquis d'Elbeuf, general of the galleys, took the young king out to sea on one of his five vessels. The king very much enjoying the experience. The marquis d'Elbeuf subsequently made for Marseille, so that he might prepare for the review of the galleys that Charles would conduct after he reached the port city.

=== Marseille ===
Leaving Toulon, the court lunched at Ollioules on 4 November, before making their way through treacherous rocks to arrive at La Cadière where a royal entry was made. Such 'treacherous rocks' were again navigated on 5 November as the court made its way to spend the night at Aubagne. On 6 November, the court arrived in Marseille, having passed by (for lunch) the house of the captain of the château d'If - a fortification on the Île d'If in the harbour of Marseille - on route. In the Spanish ambassador's estimation, Marseille was a fervently Catholic city. Álava nevertheless held concerns about the potentially hostile designs of the French Mediterranean naval presence in Marseille as regarded Spain. Marseille was also a restive city, and descended into a riot through the night after the captain of the city guard was shot by one of the Count Rhinegrave's men. Had the Rhinegrave been recognised during the tumult, he might have been killed, but the marquis d'Elbeuf protected him.

With the court having arrived outside Marseille, the consuls of the city prostrated themselves at Charles' feet. A harangue was then delivered by Pierre Vento. A young lady, daughter of the First Consul, arrived riding a chariot which was drawn by thirteen laurel wearing boys. She recited some verses and gave the keys of Marseille to Charles. Charles swore that he would preserve the city's liberties and statutes. The king made his entry into the city through the royal gate. As he made his way in, it was under a fleur de lys canopy borne by three of the consuls. Coming to the place Neuve, a triumphal arch had been erected to victories. At the plan Saint-Michel, a platform had been erected for him to observe the parade of the militia companies from the four districts of the city. Terminating his progress through the city in front of the cathedral, he was received by the bishop of Marseille. For his own amusement, king Charles threw the Protestant prince de Béarn's cap into the cathedral to force him to cross the threshold so that he might retrieve it. This was a joke that the king often returned to with the Protestant prince.

The king boarded one of the galleys in the harbour, the boat therefore receiving the name Charlotte-Catherine. Mass would be celebrated aboard this vessel. Charles resolved that he wished to visit the château d'If, which had been constructed during the reign of his grandfather Francis I. To this end he embarked on the galley La Réale, and with thirteen other ships made for the island. Winds picked up and the court was unable to make a landing on If. Charles therefore lunched on the galley, while his brother the duc d'Orléans was overcome with sea sickness. Charles hoped to develop the French navy, and thereby reduce France's dependency on Ottoman naval support. The princes, dressed as 'Turks' (clothed in white and blue with 'Moorish' jackets and Greek caps), then prepared to join a mock naval battle between two squadrons of galleys. The galley they were attacking was one of Malta. It was not only the Valois princes dressed this way, but also the prince de Béarn and the maréchal de Bourdillon. This scandalised Álava. who was further put out by a 'Moorish ballet' a few days later, in which Charles' sister Marguerite dressed as 'a Turk' (at the direction of Catherine). Charles was greatly pleased with the dance, and handed out gold chains to all the dancers and captains. These displays were a 'clear illustration' of the strength of the Franco-Ottoman alliance, and a challenge to Spanish power in the Mediterranean. Returning to port from their naval escapades, the royal party was greeted with cannon fire salutes.

Sutherland records that while the court was in Marseille, on 9 November, the edict of Amboise was affirmed. Roberts elaborates, stating that the crown ordered the provincial governors and officials to abide by the edict in its totality.

Álava reported on an incident in which a Provençal merchant came to complain to Catherine that the Catalans had seized his vessel due to the trade he conducted with the 'Moors'. According to the ambassador, Catherine took a grandstanding position for the benefit of the Marseille consuls and other Provençals, announcing she would void the peace with Philip if he insisted on interfering with trade conducted with the 'Turk'. Her son, the king, would put both his person and his possessions in service of this cause. She then wrote Álava, who showed the letter to the consuls, and reproached them for misleading Catherine. Around this time, near La Rochelle, in the town of Thi, a Protestant colloquy met. They resolved to petition the crown for full religious liberty for Protestantism in their city and government.

Back in Marseille, a wooden fort had been constructed, so that it might be assaulted by the galleys. The assault on this fort lasted several days. For the Grand Master of Malta, he gifted a fine bird from his aviary. Charles behaved with utmost Catholicity during his stay in Marseille, and appointed consuls for the city that pleased the population. In sum, eight days were spent in Marseille.

=== Arles ===
The court left for Martigues on 13 November. On route, they passed by the bastide of La Bédoule to spend the night at the town of Marignane, which boasted a château. From here, on 14 November, Charles embarked so that he might reach the three towns which stitched together by bridges to form Martigues: Jonquères, L'Île, and Martigues. Having made an entrye to Martigues, he embarked on the pound after lunch. Moving on, the court spent the night at the town of Saint-Chamas, which likewise offered the king an entrye. On 15 November, the court reached Saint-Martin-de-Crau before crossing the Camargue, where Charles admired the lush herbs of this region. Here, the court saw flamingos. The court arrived at the city of Arles on 16 November. Due to a flood of the Rhône the court was forced to stay in Arles for 21 days, from 16 November to 7 December. While there, the court witnesses a bullfight. Les Alyscamps, an avenue of Roman sarcophagi, was also visited during the courts stay here. Álava was very much pleased by the Catholicity of Arles.

An envoy of the admiral de Coligny arrived in Arles. This representative complained of the outrages committed by the Catholics and noted that Coligny would not be able to restrain the Protestant party unless the guilty were punished. With the king enjoying pleasant trivialities, Catherine and L'Hôpital looked to secure acceptance for the edict of Amboise from the estates of Languedoc. The constable de Montmorency appeared to be open to the possibility of allowing Protestant rites in Provence. According to Champion, the mood there was very much against the edict, with only three delegates favouring the edicts continuity.

On 20 November, an envoy from the pope arrived in Arles. Pius indicated his deference to Catherine on the matter of the position of Legate of Avignon, noting that he would consider the worthy qualities of the cardinal de Bourbon. He further afforded Charles the right to select those of suitable station for the position of cardinal. Catherine lavished the pope with praise, to the surprise of Álava. The cardinal de Bourbon would become the Legate of Avignon.

Various rumours swirled as to where the court would go from Arles. Some believed it would head straight for Montpellier, others that it was planning on returning to Avignon. Montmorency wished for the court to go back to Lyon, the financial and trade centre of the kingdom.

== Languedoc ==
During December, the king declared to the Languedoc Protestants that they were absolved of investigations into the monies they had levied during the civil war before their cities were handed over to the comte de Caylus.

=== Tarascon ===
Finally able to depart Arles, the court arrived in Tarascon on 7 December, having travelled up the Rhône to this place. Charles visited the church and tomb of the local saint, Marthe. Scandalised, Álava reported that the royal family and gentleman had worn Turkish attire to visit the relics. The Ambassador was even more vexed to see a cardinal dressed in this way. The court devoted its three days in Tarascon to dancing, while the difficult business of transferring the supplies of the court across the Rhône by a pontoon was undertaken.

It was while here that an agreement between the Protestants and Catholics was forged by which Protestantism would be tolerated in the Cévennes and they would conduct their burials and baptisms in Provence during the nights. Outside of these provisions, Protestantism would not be practiced in Provence. Preaching in noble houses would be subject to a punishment of 1,000 écus for a first offence, and confiscation of property for repeated transgressions. Of the parlementaires imported from Paris to Aix, four would be maintained, and the other eight could be Provençaux. The comte de Tende would remain as governor of Provence with the seigneur de Sommerive (his son) as his lieutenant. Sommerive and a certain Dorès were admonished by the king. Charles encouraged them to live as good Catholics but not to defy his will. If they did transgress, he would not show mercy but severely punish them. This arrangement satisfied neither Catholics nor Protestants. According to Champion, the Catholics complained that a Protestant governor had been maintained at Meaux. The Protestants put hand to their swords and suggested if the edict of Amboise would not be abided by the weapon could deliver it to them.

Contrasting welcomes are found by the court in the Protestant dominated cities of Beaucaire (which was right across the river Rhône from Tarascon) and Nîmes. While the court was still in Tarascon, Champion reports that the Protestants of Beaucaire called out to Tarascon, urging those of the latter place to see the comte de Tende enforce the edict of Amboise properly or face the consequences. Charles was likewise encouraged not to order an arrangement contrary to the edict or he would regret it. As for Catherine, the heckles addressed to her were not repeated by Álava in his report, but he gave assurance that they wanted to kill her.

=== Nîmes ===
The court would not choose to stay long in Beaucaire, even though the city afforded them an entrye, moving on to Sernhac, with the king stopping at the Pont du Gard, an ancient Roman aqueduct that had served the city of Nîmes. They took lunch at the château de Saint-Privat, residence of the comte de Crussol, he being a servant of Catherine's. Crussol arranged for 'nymphs' to present baskets of preserves and fruits to the party. Moving on from Saint-Privat that afternoon the court made on for Nîmes.

The court was eagerly welcomed to Nîmes. The seigneur de Damville, having learned that the consuls of Nîmes wanted to put yellow and white ribbons on the place the king would reside and the triumphal arches, was made suspicious. He informed them the king's colours were white, blue, and crimson. His father, the constable de Montmorency, saw to it that the royal colours were flown. At the gate of the city, a mountain had been erected, through which a tunnel had been created. As the king approached, the opening was closed, and two young girls approached to present the keys of Nîmes to Charles, this done, the passageway reopened and Charles could progress. Inside Nîmes, Charles saw a mechanical fire breathing crocodile, piloted by six men, that represented the city's coat of arms. Fireworks were prepared on a salamander column, the representation of king Francis I. In the place du Collège fountains of water and wine flowed. The procession continued onwards to the bishop's palace, which would serve as Charles's residence while he was in Nîmes.

The next day, the people of Nîmes made known their displeasure at the composition of their consulate. It was around election time, and Charles outlined the procedure for the next election, two candidates would be selected for each office by lot and presented to the seigneur de Damville to make the choice between. Damville would select a lawyer of the cathedral chapter as first consul, arousing angry protestations from the Protestants (with Tulchin suspecting that Damville interfered with the lottery). The Protestants complained about the seigneur de Damville's conduct at large, charging him with repaying the taxes they gave him with violence. The historian Chevallier credits the seigneur de Damville with having maintained order in Nîmes for the king's visit. Charles rebuked the Protestants, defending Damville. Nevertheless, the king entrusted Renaud de Beaune with examining these complaints.

=== Montpellier ===
Though it at first appeared the court would be stuck in Nîmes by the weather, as they had been in Arles, it was resolved to progress on to Montpellier for Christmas. The night was spent at Vauvert on 14 December, then the next day Aigues-Mortes which granted an entry to the royal party. On 16 December the court took the night at Marsillargues, which similarly afforded Charles an entry. The next day, 17 December, the court passed through the village of Saint-Brès arriving in Montpellier in the evening.

Montpellier had been chosen as the city to winter in, due to the fact that Narbonne had been made inaccessible by the weather. The city had been in the hands of the Protestants before its Catholic reconquest in 1563, and the Catholics came out bearing palm fronds for the royal entry. The Protestants were absent. Several resting points had been prepared for the king outside of Montpellier, including one at the garden of the seigneur de Villeneuve, governor of Montpellier. The Estates came out of the city to regale Charles with speeches. Some of the merchants were dressed in the king's colours, others in velvet and satin. The various other officers of the city were also present. The king himself made his progress under a canopy of crimson velvet which was borne by the cities six consuls. The grand écuyer (grand squire) Claude Gouffier held the royal sword over his shoulder. At the entrance of the city, four pillars had been erected to support the imperial crown. Two girls represented Piety and Justice. Before the consulate, and the royal residence, triumphal arches had been raised adorned with verse and paintings in the antique style. The authorities of Montpellier required the inhabitants of the city to involve themselves in a procession past the holy sites of the city on pain of a 100 livres fine. Álava observed the absence of the comte de Crussol from the procession.

During the court's time in Montpellier, the Spanish ambassador Álava protested concerning the reinforcements the prince de Condé was instituting in his government of Picardy, which was on the border with the Spanish Netherlands. In a 21 December audience with the Spanish ambassador, conducted shortly after the affirmation of the Franco-Swiss alliance, the conversation took a heated turn. Álava reported on the exchange back to Philip. In the meeting, Catherine levelled recriminations of Spanish interference in the French effort to establish the alliance. Catherine also defended the power of France, to which Álava responded by noting that Charles was not as strong a king as Philip might hope. Catherine bade Álava explain this, and she was backed up by Charles, who demanded the Ambassador explain himself. Álava elaborated, religion was divided in France, its justice system was weak, and while the king himself was a worthy man there were those who bore him ill designs. This charge was rebuffed by Catherine, who argued that no king of France before Charles had been so well obeyed. Charles joined in, speaking of the love and respect all held for him. Álava regrouped, stating that the king had advisors who were not prudent. He also understood there to be intrigues taking place across the kingdom against the king and god. Catherine conceded there was some truth to this, but that they were working to resolve this. The audience then moved to the matter of the relics of Saint-Eugène, which the Spanish were hoping to acquire. Catherine stated that the cardinal de Lorraine was opposed to parting with it, though it would yet be a couple days until he had made a decision on the matter. She noted that the cardinal de Lorraine had recently met with the prince de Condé, and asked Álava for his opinion on this. Álava opined that the meeting had transpired at the direction of Catherine, and that it was an ill prospect. Catherine denied that she had arranged the affair and noted she had no knowledge of the contents of the meeting. Álava expressed his surprise that such great enemies would meet to undertake a discussion without Catherine's knowledge. The queen mother added that the cardinal de Châtillon had also been party to this meeting. Álava explained that the meeting must have been to decide how to snatch the crown from Charles' head and kill Catherine/Charles. Catherine rejoindered with scepticism to this, noting that the cardinal de Châtillon was a trustworthy man. Álava brushed this away as irrelevant, as the others at the meeting did not possess this quality. Frustrated with how the conversation was going, Álava moved to ironic dismissal, noting that the continual formation of leagues in France was a testament to the loyalty of the king's subjects. He pontificated that perhaps they were negotiating a peace agreement they would all find most pleasant to receive. Giving his concluding thoughts on the meeting of the cardinal de Lorraine for his letter to Philip, he reaffirmed his belief that the meeting had been organised by Catherine but conceded that perhaps the reintegration of the Coligny-Châtillon into the royal fold might be what Lorraine was trying to accomplish for Catherine. The ambassador also confided his suspicions in the behaviour of the other ambassadors with the French court, who had been absent for up to several weeks. He saw in this the shadow of an Ottoman military project.

A few days previous, the constable de Montmorency had got into a spat with the chancellor L'Hôpital that had required the intervention of the cardinal de Bourbon and maréchal de Bourdillon to reconcile the men. On 20 December, a group of between 1,300 and 1,400 persons came to lodge complaint about the seigneur de Damville and request a site for their worship. Álava viewed this request sinisterly.

The court celebrated Christmas in the city. Come 26 December, a mandatory Catholic procession was to transpire for Saint Stephen's day, with pain of fine for non-attendance. The announcement to this effect was published on 24 December. This occasioned protest from the Protestants, who argued it was contrary to the edict of Amboise. A delegation met with Catherine. They succeeded in their goal, with an observe to the 26 December procession noting that the Protestants were not obliged to participate or hang their homes with tapestries. The royal family all participated, dressed in finery: Charles in a blue coat embroidered with silver, Marguerite dressed similarly, and the duc d'Orléans in a black coat. Álava observed few Protestants in the procession, even among the Protestant nobles, who could on occasion be seen at Mass. Catherine led the Spanish ambassador by the arm for the procession. The seigneur de Damville came to speak discreetly with the Spanish ambassador. He explained he dare not pay him a formal visit, to which the ambassador responded that he dare not ask him to, for fear of harming his position. They were then joined by another fervent Catholic, the marquis de Villars. The Frenchmen present complained that Philip was doing wrong by France, to allow Catholicism to become so compromised here. Álava assured that Philip would give his life for the service of god. Villars complained that Philip had failed them.

Later that day, after leaving Mass, Catherine invited the cardinal de Bourbon and Álava to join her for lunch. She inquired of the Ambassador for his opinion on the procession. Álava refused to answer until push to do so, at which point he explained it was more a bitter event than a sweet one. Catherine took quite a contrary view, feeling that her sons had shown good devotion at the Mass. Álava then seized upon Catherine's statement from their meeting a few days earlier, at which she had stated the king was well obeyed. He suggested the attendance at the procession was quite contrary to this. Many had been at their windows or doors, still wearing their caps. At the lunch proper, the cardinal de Bourbon noted the religious situation in the kingdom was in a worse way than it had been a few years prior.

Meeting with the constable de Montmorency at dinner, the Ambassador received Montmorency's thanks for the reception afforded to his son, the seigneur de Méru, who had gone on an extraordinary diplomatic mission to Spain. Álava inquired of him when Catherine would resolve things in France. Montmorency indicated to him that now was not the time for that question.

Speaking with the dowager duchesse de Guise, Catherine confided that her brother-in-law, the cardinal de Lorraine was in the process of coming to terms with the enemies of she and her late husband, without Charles' cognisance. Tearful, the duchesse restated her hope that justice would be done for the killing of her husband.

On 27 December, dances took place in the main square of Montpellier. The trellis was danced by locals with flowered hoops, costumes and masks. The next day, Charles, on a hunt, approached Villeneuve, near Maguelone. Here, he saw the flight of flamingos.

Leaving Montpellier on 30 December, the court passed through Fabrègues where they lunched and took the night at Poullan. It would be here that Charles passed the final day of 1564. On the advice of chancellor L'Hôpital, garrisons were left in Montpellier and Nîmes. As the court progressed deeper into Languedoc the weather was foul, and in the chaos, the duc d'Orléans lost his baggage. After this episode, the court had to stop to regroup. 1 January 1565 was spent at Poussan, with the night passed at Florensac, a territory of the comte de Crussol. On 2 January, the court arrived at Agde. The river Hérault was forded by a boat bridge on 3 January and lunch was taken at the village of Villeneuve.

=== Béziers ===
Charles arrived in Béziers on the evening of 3 January 1565. The city was thoroughly Protestant, and thus the court little desired to spend a long time in the place. The city granted an entry to the king the next day. Entering through the Carmelite gate, a scene of a naval battle was presented, a combat between two galleys on wheels. They pitched and rolled as if they were on the sea. Two young girls presented the keys of Béziers to Charles. Inside the city, two tableau were presented that were designed to be provocative to the court, one, before the hôtel de ville showed a grove featuring a woodland scene in which Diana was pursued by Satyrs, evocative of Catherine's late-husband's mistress Diane. The other, at the place du Marché a painting showing the capture of the town by the Protestants, something the tour was intending to cast from memory.

The king took up residence in the bishop's palace, and the queen mother in the residence of the baron de Sorgues. The following day, they heard grievances from the cities Protestants and Catholics. Charles was presented with a silver Pallas, and Catherine a silver cup filled with golden medallions.

=== Narbonne ===
Leaving Béziers on 4 January, Nissan was crossed before the court arrived in Narbonne, where they would stay for two days for the celebration of Epiphany. Narbonne was strongly Catholic, and thus shown particular royal favour. Leaving Narbonne, the court arrived at Sigean on 7 January, then the next day the furthest extremity of France, Leucate, only four leagues from Spanish held Perpignan. This visit allowed the observation of the fortification works in this border town. With the cardinals de Bourbon, de Guise and de Strozzi, as well as the maréchal de Bourdillon and the seigneur d'Escars, Catherine travelled by boat to the fort de Salses. The journey was undertaken in high spirits and proved the occasion for joking. Salses was inside the kingdom of Spain, and Catherine sent word to the captain of the place so that her arrival would not be taken as a cause for alarm. She gave instruction to the Spanish captain to inform Philip of her arrival. His men were not to approach the walls, as she was there simply to take a stroll and enjoy the countryside. Heading back to Sigean, the court returned to Narbonne where they arrived on the evening of 9 January for the second time. This visit would last a night and day. From Narbonne, the court was to be found taking lunch at Canet on 11 January, spending the night at the village of Moux. The next day, they lunched at Barbaira before arriving at the city of Carcassonne in the evening.

=== Carcassonne ===
On 12 January, Charles entered upper Carcassonne (the cité) with the intention of going down to the lower city of Carcassonne the following day. However, the rapid build-up of snow made this impossible, and the court was forced to bivouac. While they waited for the weather to improve, a snow fort was built in the courtyard before the king's residence, and those of his household were charged with defending it against attackers from Carcassonne. The townsfolk were defeated in this combat. Another battle pitted the pages and footmen of the royal household against one another. The princes fought with snowballs. Catherine was frustrated by the delays, and to sooth her, it was explained to her that her predecessors Blanche of Castile and Marie of Anjou had experienced several months of being snowed in while in this part of the country. At the instigation of the comte de Crussol, Catherine wrote the seigneur de Damville to remove the garrison from the town of Uzès, on the grounds of the towns poverty and promised her there would be no further disorders.

Finally, the snows melted, and on 22 January Charles made to enter the lower city. The entry prepared for the king had been ruined by the snow, the triumphal arches having collapsed. With the king approaching, the seigneur de Melun, the viguier (a magistrate) of Carcassonne approached him at the head of 500 young men on horseback. This group discharged muskets. Charles then made his way through the crowd to a crimson tent (around the Jacobin gate) with his retinue. A consul of the city gave an address to the assembled, as the troop marched passed. This included not only the 500 young men with muskets, but also another 500 dressed as 'savages' and the militia who walked on foot. Behind these military men came the religious orders of Carcassonne and the faithful. As Charles crossed the drawbridge, a youth, dressed as cupid, awarded him the keys of the city, combining this presentation with a few lines of verse. Charles entered Carcassonne under a canopy provided by the consuls, followed by the duc d'Orléans and the prince de Béarn. Progressing through the city, Charles made his way to the church of Saint-Vincent, where the king said his prayers. From here to the Officialité which had been luxuriously furnished. In the streets, tapestries were hung.

The following day, the consuls of the city came to present a silver model of Carcassonne to Charles. While in Carcassonne, Charles tasked two gentlemen of his suite with investigating the consular elections, that the governor of Languedoc, the baron de Damville, had rigged in the winter of 1563-64 to exclude the Protestants from government. Though this was intended to curry favour with the Protestants of Languedoc, the representatives did not institute a regime of religious neutrality in the consular election process. Catherine showed great Catholic devotion during the stay in Carcassonne with her trips to the church of the Augustinians for her prayers.

On 26 January, the court departed Carcassonne, passing through Arzens and spending the night at Montréal which overlooked the Montagne Noire. The following day, lunch was taken at Prouille with the night passed at the château de Villepinte. On 28 January, the court arrived at the château de Ferrals, where the seigneur de Ferrals (future French ambassador to Rome) surprised the king after a great feast by having the ceiling above the king's head open so that the guests might receive a sprinkle of almonds and perfumed water. Charles shielded his head with his cloak. That same day the court arrived at Castelnaudary, where the king would make an entrye the following day. Here, the court bore witness to the local dance, the Martingale. Not knowing how to dance himself, Charles had to content himself with watching. They then departed on 30 January. In both Carcassonne and Castelnaudary, Catherine was petitioned against the burdens of supporting the garrison Damville had been imposing on the places. She offered the places her protection against this imposition.

On 30 January, the court passed through Avignonet and Villefranche-de-Lauragais. The night was passed at Villenouvelle where the court was still to be found the following day for lunch. Leaving Villenouvelle, the court passed through Baziège and Montgiscard, visiting the Naurouze stones on route. The story concerning these stones was that they had been placed by a fairy, and the meeting of the stones would abolish the shame of the world.

=== Toulouse ===
The constable de Montmorency entered Toulouse on 26 January, having gone ahead of the main royal party. He was followed by many prominent Catholic nobles including: the vicomte de Joyeuse (lieutenant-general of Languedoc), seigneur de Monluc (lieutenant-general of Guyenne), comte d'Escars, baron de Terride, baron de Gondrin, baron de Bellegarde, and seigneur de Lanssac who were all in anticipation of the courts arrival five days later. Alone among these men, the seigneur de Monluc brought with him an escort of 1,200 Gascon gentleman seeking payment for their actions in defence of Catholicism. Champion ascribes an alternate purpose to Monluc's presence in Toulouse, that being to denigrate the French ambassador to Spain, Saint-Sulpice. This influx of soldiers was to the displeasure of Catherine, it having been forbidden during the royal tour for men-at-arms to gather for any reason. Nevertheless, Catherine did not object too severely, seeing that Monluc would ensure the courts safety while they were in Guyenne. The king was apprehensive about the entry, given to understand as he was that the Catholics refused to allow the Protestants to appear before him. Catherine and L'Hôpital ordered the Catholics to disperse. The bishop of Valence, brother of the seigneur de Monluc, was entrusted with seeing to the dispersal of these Gascon nobles from Toulouse prior to Charles' arrival. According to the historian Sournia, through the intervention of Valence, on the grounds of difficulty of provision of foodstuff and housing with the imminent arrival of the royal party, Monluc and his men-at-arms were sent away from Toulouse. This sour development for Monluc was sweetened by the admission of the seigneur into the conseil privé (privy council). Though she had lessened the blow that had been delivered, Catherine remained conscious of Monluc's brutal reputation. Therefore, when the need to punish wrongdoers in Sainte-Foy and Bergerac arose, she entrusted the responsibility of handling the affair to another. Champion records the episode differently, stating that Monluc claimed he transmitted this dispersal order to his men, but they baulked, arguing that if they were sent away they would never again serve the crown. Monluc then wrote to Catherine to explain that his men were eager to take the opportunity to see Charles while he lived, which was not believed to be a long time. Keen to refute this rumour of her son's longevity, Catherine had little choice but to let the Gascons stay for the royal arrival.

Also preceding the court into Toulouse was the Spanish ambassador Álava. His opinion of the city was decidedly dim, being left with the impression that a great part of the population was Protestant, including a majority of the présidents of the parlement. The ambassador dined with the cardinal d'Armagnac. Álava expressed his disappointment that the cardinal welcomed both Protestants and Catholics into his home. The Ambassador despaired for the state of Catholicism in France.

Charles arrived before Toulouse on 31 January. The entry was postponed until 1 February to best allow the Capitouls (urban magistrates of Toulouse) of the city to prepare the place for him. The king informally entered Toulouse on this day, touring the city, before returning to the Roquettes. The next day, Catherine arrived with the court. Along with her were her daughter Marguerite and Renée, the duchess of Ferrara.

The court made their entry into Toulouse on 1 February. The streets had been lined with sand, with tapestries hung out in the main streets. Leaving the Roquettes, Charles was subject to a speech from the premier président of the parlement, Jean Daffis. Musketry was fired off. Cannons were likewise fired in welcome, however one of them exploded killing the artillery commissioners and three gunners. Charles ordered they cease their fire. Charles then bore witness to the passing of the procession, in which motets were sung, with cries of "ong live the King!". Behind the singers, arquebusiers, pikemen, and Gascon soldiers. The basochiens (guild of legal clerks) followed their ensign on horseback. Small children then rode by following a flag. Sons of the city and nobles followed in ostentatious dress. After these, the merchants, then the parlementaires and finally the archers of the prévôt de l'hôtel. 'Nymphs' begged Charles (in verse) to come and see Toulouse. The capitouls of the city knelt before him. They then delivered a speech in which they implored the king to protect the liberties of their city as had his forebears. This done, the capitouls presented him the keys to the city. The royal party then entered Toulouse. Temporary arches had been raised for the occasion, giving the entry the appearance of a Roman triumph. Various other displays glorified the monarchy and denounced both aristocratic and democratic subversion against the state. At the place de la Peyre a suspended mechanical apple was lowered upon the king's approach. From this apple, a schoolboy emerged and recited a harangue in Latin, before returning to the inside of the fruit. In the place Saint-Étienne before the archbishop's palace a large crowd cried out "Long live the King!". Charles toured the various state bodies of Toulouse late into the night. Bonfires were lit on the street to aid navigation and combat the fierce cold. Outside the archbishop's palace, which would house the king, the cardinal d'Armagnac had seen to the establishment of wooden barracks to house the royal entourage.

The visit to Toulouse was an opportunity for indulging in carnival festivities. These saw the mixing of Protestants and Catholics. Masquerades and jousts were held. Sonnets of the poet Ronsard were also performed. The dancing would go onto midnight on occasion. The Portuguese ambassador arrived in Toulouse during the courts stay, and for several days, Catherine's daughter Marguerite was to be found dressed in the Portuguese style. On 20 February, a banquet was held in Charles' honour at the Capitole. Charles arrived an hour early and asked for something to eat. The Portuguese ambassador became the subject of laughter and was teased by ladies who repeatedly drank to their health such that the Ambassador had to ask them to stop. When the tables were cleared, Charles watched a play and the dancing.

On the first Sunday of Lent (20 February), Charles crossed the river Garonne and lunched at the château of the archbishop of Toulouse. That same day a marriage was celebrated, and a masquerade was enjoyed. Toulouse had recently passed an ordinance prohibiting the eating of meat during Lent. This was resented by a member of the municipal council viewed this measure as a violation of the edict of Amboise which afforded freedom of conscience. Charles, writing to a Villeparisis noted that the edict of Amboise only precluded the buying and selling of meat, not its eating by Protestants during Lent.

The court would spend the next forty-five days in the city. The day after their arrival in Toulouse was the feast of the purification, Charles and the young prince de Béarn made their way to the cathedral of Toulouse for the occasion. Charles invited the prince de Béarn to enter with him, but the young Protestant refused apologetically. Charles repeated his joke from earlier in the tour, tossing the princes hat over the threshold. A follower of the prince de Béarn crossed the door to pick it up for him so he would not need to enter.

It was while the court was in Toulouse that Catherine received word from Philip II that an interview would be granted with her daughter, the queen of Spain at Bayonne. The seigneur de La Mothe-Fénelon, who had brought the news from Spain, was entrusted with offering Catherine's gratitude to the Spanish king for affording this opportunity.

Word also arrived of the disorders that were troubling Paris, with the admiral de Coligny having brought 600 horsemen to the city. In the light of this news, the Protestant Toulousian petition (brought by several hundred of their number) requesting the right to worship in Toulouse and several other places was dismissed by the crown on 7 February. The petition itself was confiscated. Similarly, the Protestants of Montauban who were present, and who pled their loyalty to the crown, were instructed to dismantle their fortress, with the constable de Montmorency refusing to listen to them. The visit to Toulouse also proved to be the occasion for the king to provide a settlement to the community of Pamiers, which had been wracked with religious discord and violence going back to the first Civil War. The Protestant party in the city was championed by the queen of Navarre. Charles resolved on the measures to be taken in Pamiers, which would be enforced by parlementaires. His edicts would be obeyed, the consulate of the city renewed, wrongs righted (with stolen goods returned and compensation for damages paid), and Catholicism restored. When a Protestant frustratedly explained to Charles that he had three times refused the worship he sought to conduct, and that he desired to sell his property and retire to a foreign land where he might be able to practice his faith, Charles responded that he was free to emigrate, but not sell off his property which belonged to the king. This severity was, in the view of Cloulas, a performance for the Spanish ambassador. Hoping that he would report back to Philip this tough action and maybe join his wife in Bayonne.

The Catholics of Grenade secured from Charles the moving of Protestant worship out of their city and to the place of Cornebarrieu. In relation to the grievances of the Catholics of Nîmes, Charles issued a decree in March. He gave order that until such time as Catholicism, and the Mass, was restored, the incomes of the non-practicing benefices should be seized. In a contrary step, he afforded two lots in Nîmes for the Protestants to construct churches and gave order that the royal troops in the city be confined to the château. Access to the council was to be afforded without regard to religion. While the Protestants would set about building on the land the king had afforded them, they would not surrender control of the benefices under their control. The Catholic council similarly saw little reason to allow the Protestants access to their ranks.

For some time, the French crown had been attempting to see to the return of the capitouls who had been exiled and sentenced to death as a result of the fighting of the first French War of Religion. The presence of the crown in the city finally allowed for the achievement of this policy, which was resented by the judiciary of Toulouse. Even then, it was not a complete royal victory, as one of the capitouls could still be found absent some of his sold off property years later in 1572. Similarly the matter of the return of the Protestant parlementaires to their office, which had been obstructed since the end of the war by their Catholic colleagues. In the banquet that transpired in the hôtel de ville on 2 March, some Protestant parlementaires, whose portraits had been erased during the first civil war, petitioned for their restoration. To the frustration of the Catholics, the portraits would be redone.

While in the capital of Languedoc on 5 February, Charles held a lit de justice before the parlement of the city, which was attended by the prince de Béarn. In this session radical Catholicism was denounced and the pacification edict reaffirmed by L'Hôpital, much to the annoyance of the seigneur de Damville and Álava. The lit de justice also saw Charles repeat the issuance of letters patent and ordinances prohibiting the proliferation of firearms. A case debated before Charles during the session concerned an incident which had transpired in Nîmes in which the duchess of Ferrara, Renée, returning from a Protestant synod had been subject to words she found insulting, with stones thrown at her carriage. The Toulousians responsible for this episode were sentenced to be whipped at the crossroads. Another case tried before the king concerned the complaint of Catherine de Narbonne concerning the Protestant seigneur de Ferrières. She charged Ferrières with having stolen her furniture during the first civil war. Ferrières cited the edict of Amboise's amnesty. Charles ordered both parties to live as friends to one another, though Ferrières was instructed to return the furniture he'd stolen. The matter of Damville's governorship, which had been the subject of Protestant complaints, had been referred to the parlement of Toulouse. Listening to the complaints against his son, the Constable exclaimed that if the accusations were true, his son should be executed, but if not, those who slandered him should be punished. One of the Protestant accusers, a Clausonne from Nîmes, was arrested. Passions were then cooled.

On 8 February, a significant induction of the military aristocracy of Languedoc into the Order of Saint-Michel was undertaken, with at least thirty-one men being inducted into the royal order in sum. This included men such as the commanders of the compagnies d'ordonnance of Languedoc: the seigneur de Bellegarde, and the comte d'Aubijoux.

On 3 March, Charles granted consuls, an Bourse (exchange market) and judge for the capital of the Limousin, the city of Limoges. This was registered in Limoges on 17 April 1565. This was the first of a series of royal grants to the towns of the Limousin. By these grants, Charles could position himself as a defender of the cities against the domination of the ecclesiastical seigneurs that had previously held sway. The granting of the Bourse to Limoges was an assault on the prerogatives of the queen of Navarre, in her position as vicomte de Limoges. Judicial powers were taken from her and given to the local merchants. She attempted a legal challenge to the move. Ultimately this legal proceeding would not advantage the Protestants.

Charles again affirmed that public office should be neutral in terms of religion on 13 March 1565. Catherine looked to open marriage negotiations for the duc d'Orléans with queen Elizabeth I at this time, in the hopes of inspiring in the Spanish king a fear of an Anglo-French alliance. Marriage negotiations were also on the mind of the Scottish ambassador as related to Mary, Queen of Scots. He reached out to Álava to discuss the situation. He noted that Elizabeth would not permit Mary to marry without her blessing, but that Mary had received proposals from German princes and also Catherine on behalf of the duc d'Orléans. Indeed, the cardinal de Lorraine had suggested such a match for the duc d'Orléans back in August 1563, to pre-empt a Habsburg match. The Scottish ambassador wished to pick up these negotiations but wanted to ensure the Spanish were in the loop.

On 18 March, a procession transpired in Toulouse in which the relics of Saint-Sernin were held aloft. The court visited the reliquaries of the city. At the basilica of Saint-Sernin in the city, the cardinal d'Armagnac oversaw the confirmation (rite of initiation into the Catholic church) of the duc d'Orléans and his younger brother the duc d'Anjou on 17 March. At this time they abandoned their birth names (Alexandre-Édouard and Hercule respectively) for Henri and François, names that invoked their Valois-Angoulême father and grandfather respectively. Orléans's abandonment of the name of his godfather, the Protestant king Edward of England was to the great pleasure of the Spanish ambassador after it was explained to him by Catherine that the reason for the abandonment of the name was to distance the prince from Protestant heresy. Meanwhile, the English ambassador, Thomas Smith, who was also on the tour was scandalised. He noted that on one day, he had been being fed honeyed words of French friendship, then the next he had been slapped with this insult. He protested on this to Álava, noting that he had quickly apprised the queen of England, Elizabeth, of what had transpired. He speculated that the negotiations he was undertaking with Catherine would fall through as a result. In addition to these rites, the education of the young princes would also be taken stock of while the court was in Toulouse under the auspices of a certain de Selve.

On 19 March, the court made its departure from Toulouse. The courts visit to Toulouse had represented a shift in power in the city back from the parlement towards the capitouls.

== Guyenne ==
=== Montauban ===
The court now entered Guyenne, a province over which the young prince de Béarn was governor. Béarn thus preceded the court into the cities by a day, so that he might welcome Charles upon the royal entrye. Having left Toulouse on 19 March, the court made for Saint-Jory and Fronton. The next day, they lunched at the small place of Clau before crossing the river Tarn, and arriving at the Protestant stronghold of Montauban around 15:00. The royal order had been received in February to dismantle the fortifications of Montauban, and this was now underway. The munitions and arms of the city had been placed into the hands of the seigneur de Monluc, in his capacity as lieutenant-general of Guyenne. The prince de Béarn had entered Montauban the preceding day. He was received to the singing of psalms. The next day, 20 March, Charles arrived. The singing of psalms quickly stopped before the king's look of disapproval. He was met by the prince de Béarn, maréchal de Bourdillon and seigneur de Monluc. On the periphery of the Tolozenc suburb, twelve children on horseback sung French verse for Charles. At the Pont gate, the consuls of the city handed over the keys of the city to Charles, and by this symbolic gesture allowing Catholic worship, which had been prohibited, to resume in Montauban. A harangue was delivered and the consuls knelt in submission before the king with bare heads. Charles would affirm the privileges of the city, but, when children began to cry "Long live the King" he ordered them silenced. The king proceeded into the city proper under a pall, borne by the consuls. On the triumphal arches that adorned the city, the story of king Solomon and Josiah (the latter of whom the Protestants compared to Charles). Non-Christian Mythology was absent from the Montauban celebrations. Miquel characterises the royal entrance into Montauban as a 'submission', with the artillery and iron chain that crossed the street removed, in addition to the fort des Jacobins having been destroyed prior to the event..

In return for their submissive attitude, the city secured the rights for premises in which Protestants might worship. Charles also attempted to see the bishop of Montauban return to residence in his city. The bishop would return, but it was a brief return, the man little inclined to stay in light of the 'population's hostility towards the clergy'.

On 21 March, the consuls of Montauban presented a silver cup of sugared almons upon which the four elements were inscribed. The prince de Béarn was awarded a horse worth 200 écus, though the city could not actually provide it to him on account of its poverty. The Protestantism and psalm singing habits of the city encouraged the court to make on from Montauban promptly After having heard Mass on the morning of 21 March, Charles departed the city.

=== Agen ===
Crossing the Tarn again, the court took the night in Moissac. On 22 March, the court lunched at Pommevic, passed through Valence d'Agen and took the night at La Magistère. The capitouls of Toulouse had afforded boats to the royal party, and these were taken for the final stretch to Agen, with a stop for lunch at La Fox. After the prince de Béarn had entered the city around 9:00, Charles would disembark upstream of Agen.

On 23 March, the royal party made their entry into Agen which was in a state of penury as a result of plague and floods they had suffered. To ensure that the royal entrance to this city could be appropriate for the royal dignity, the seigneur de Monluc leant the city 4,000 livres. Though a much poorer and smaller city than some of the great cities of the kingdom like Lyon, the people of Agen took every effort they could for the welcome of the court. Tapestries and draperies were hung in the streets, as well as paintings of saints and heroes. The consuls, who had been waiting near the towers of Le Pin, handed the keys of the city to Charles. The king was happy to affirm the city's privileges on the condition they abided by the royal edicts. After conducting his prayers, he retired to the bishop's palace

Charles took the opportunity of being in a Catholic city to toss some bundles of Protestant literature from Geneva into the Garonne. Champion notes that some of the literature was in Spanish. The next day a separate procession saw the entry of Catherine and Marguerite into the city. The king and court were in Agen for several days, and during this time the feast of the Annunciation was celebrated by the touching of those with scrofula on 25 March. That same day, the king was presented with a silver and gilt work of art bearing the coat of arms of Agen.

While the king was at the cathedral of Saint-Étienne with Catherine, they carried the new-born daughter (named Charlotte-Catherine) of the seigneur de Monluc to the baptismal font. The king and queen mother then took the child back to Monluc's house, where a feast had been prepared. Monluc was greatly satisfied by this show of royal favour, and boasted on it to the Spanish ambassador according to a letter Álava wrote Philip. While in the city, Wanegffelen argues Catherine resecured the loyalty of the seigneur de Monluc away from any allegiance towards the Spanish camp.

Before departin from Agen, the court made for a gravel pit on the banks of the Garonne to fire crossbows, the success of which was judged by the watching Agenais.

=== Bordeaux ===
Leaving Agen by boat, the court made first for Port-Sainte-Marie, and then on to the château d'Aiguillon, where they arrived on 27 March. Having taken his lunch there, the king embarked again and made downstream for Marmande. From Marmande to La Réole on 29 March, where the court spent the night. Taking to the water, the progress continued to Cadillac on 31 March where Charles spent the night in the château of the seigneur de Candalle. The next day the court arrived at the port of Bordeaux. The Spanish ambassador preceded the court in entering Bordeaux and wrote forlornly to Philip of the successes he perceived of Protestantism in the city.

Bordeaux had been visited first by the constable de Montmorency, eleven days before the king's entry. He checked in with the parlementaires. Prior to their formal entry, Charles and Catherine themselves visited the city of Bordeaux on 1 April incognito. They spent their nights outside Bordeaux at the nearby château de Thoars.

Having embarked on a ship provided by the mayor and aldermen of Bordeaux at Fraus, the court made for Bordeaux on 9 April. The ships that carried Charles and Catherine were akin to houses, and they were escorted by seven galleons. This party stopped below the château Trompette, with the king then disembarking at the Chartreux monastery outside the city walls. The king now assumed his place on a gallery. From here he witnessed the parading of the soldiery of Bordeaux while cannons fired, and the ships unloaded their artillery. In addition to the military men, clergy and parlementaires paraded by. A band of small children dressed in white and bearing flags with the coat of arms of France cried "Long live the King!". The children of the city were led by six captains. The captain of the Basoche led a large company both mounted and on foot. A group of three hundred armed men escorted representatives of twelve 'captive nations' to the king, dressed in the traditional fashion (or alternatively disguised as representatives of those peoples). These peoples were Egyptians, Arabs, Greeks, Sri Lankans, Indigenous Americans, Indians, Canary islanders, Brazilians, Moroccans, Ethiopians, and "savages". The captain of each people delivered a speech in their own tongue which was translated for Charles. This procession lasted four hours. Here could be seen a Neptune bearing a trident, and an old man reported for his wisdom who bore a placard bearing Latin verse concerning the ancient nature of the city and Charles' youth. Two men, one representing the Garonne, the other the Dordogne stepped forward. Charles then assumed his position beneath the pall he would enter Bordeaux under, carried by the aldermen of Bordeaux. They entered via the Chapeau Rouge gate. The constable de Montmorency was too ill to take up his position in the entry, and so had to be replaced by the seigneur de Boissy for the occasion. Likewise, Monluc was able to place himself at the side of the king, his fellow lieutenant-général for Guyenne, the seigneur de Burie, being sick. Montmorency had history with Bordeaux, having crushed the gabelle tax revolt of 1548 there. Making their way up the Saint-Médoc gate on the rue Sainte-Catherine, more representations of the rivers could be found. From a shell, a young girl emerged and presented the keys of the city to Charles. She delivered a short speech. As the king made his way through the streets he found them adorned with tapestries. Arriving before the archbishop's palace Charles dismounted. Before the Saint-Projet church, a female figure bearing a chalice in one hand a host in the other could be seen with the inscription In hoc signo vinces (in this sign thou shalt conquer).

The Spanish ambassador regarded with distaste the speech given by the premier président of the Parlement. This parlementaire had come to kiss the hand of Charles with his colleagues. The sieur de Lagebâton, who held this charge, had a reputation for sympathy towards Protestantism. In Álava's opinion, Lagebâton flattered Charles. Charles had begun his hard labours at a young age. He bore a great debt to his mother Catherine for her support. Soon he would govern alone, but with her council. As regards France, in Lagebâton's mind there were no peers for the kingdom's grandeur, nor any sovereign above Charles. This included the Papacy. Álava found this piece insulting to the Tridentine decrees. Charles responded to this speech with some standard formulae. In Álava's opinion, Catherine regarded this address with distaste. Quizzed by the Papal Nuncio as to his opinion, Álava opined that no good Catholic could approve of the way Lagebâton spoke of the pope. As the harangue was ongoing, a knight of the order of Saint-Michel approached Charles and informed him Catherine was waiting for him in a nearby house.

As they had in Toulouse, and Dijon, a lit de justice was held in the parlement of Bordeaux on 12 April. L'Hôpital entered the chamber first, followed by various officials and then Catherine and Charles. The king took a seat on a throne and gave a speech in which he explained how he hoped to see his edicts obeyed, and his subjects obedient. Charles affirmed his desire for the populations disarmament during the session by means of new ordinances and letters patent. While he spoke the chancellor was standing, along with the councillors of the parlement. Charles then gave the floor to L'Hôpital. The chancellor extolled the institution of the parlement, and the concept of justice, using ancient examples from Rome. He cautioned that their role was as executors of the law, not interpreters, and that they too were subject to it. L'Hôpital excoriated the councillors for their disobedience and corruption. To the former point, they had failed to register the king's edicts, and by so doing deprived Charles of his royal dignity. He asserted that the declarations of the parlements did not supersede royal ordinances. To the latter point L'Hôpital accused parlementaires of perpetrating fraud, claiming to have served six months of the year when they had not done so. He offered the spectre of a Parisian councillor who had acted in this way and been suspended from his post while receiving heavy fines. He also charged some of their number with making loans at interest to merchants, noting that such people should consider becoming merchants themselves. As for the merchants, they aspired to place their sons as lawyers and councillors. Such ambition should instead be channelled towards the securing of the king's favour. In defiance of the peace, some parlementaires were protecting the operations of armed bands, which were spreading terror around Bordeaux, and kidnapping young girls and heiresses. These gangs were led by the comte de Candalle, his brother the bishop of Aire, the marquis de Trans and the seigneur de Melville. Lagebâton had apprised the king and Queen Mother of these affairs. L'Hôpital had issued a summons against the marquis de Trans, so he might come and answer that which he was accused of. Later confronting Trans, L'Hôpital excoriated the Marquis, causing the latter to laugh. L'Hôpital was grave, asking why Trans was laughing, when he had the power to see him executed. It was thanks to Charles' that Trans still lived. Brantôme records that this outburst almost caused Trans to faint. The power of Charles and Catherine was to be absolute, and the peace of Amboise abided by. He accused some of placing more stock in the word of their local governor than they did the word of the king. Their debates in the parlement sometimes ended in brawls. In one of his speeches, L'Hôpital stressed the legislative omnipotence of the crown. The king had the power to amend the law at his discretion, and his subjects were not above it. He reminded them that their wisdom was less than that of the king, the queen mother, and the royal council. L'Hôpital concluded his speech by noting that if the parlementaires dutifully obeyed the king's commands they could anticipate not only reward from god, but also for Charles to well reward them. If they did otherwise, ruin would follow. After L'Hôpital came a speech from Lagebâton concerning the authority of justice. Álava was as vexed by this speech as he had been by Lagebâton's last harangue, finding it emboldening towards the Protestants. Speeches over, the doors to the chamber were opened, and cases began to be heard.

Several weeks later, on 18 May, after the court had departed from Bordeaux, L'Hôpital would return to the parlement of Bordeaux, so that he might pore over the registers of the parlement and gain a picture of the conduct of the activities of their members.

After the lit de justice, a comedy by the collège de Guyenne was enjoyed. Charles and Catherine subsequently travelled to the cordeliers convent of Saint-François, where they received a Protestant petition. The Protestants hoped to construct a temple there for their worship. Catherine argued they were wasting their time, as there was already a Catholic church there, but nevertheless the petition would receive a reply.

On 18 April, Alexander Farnese (future duke of Parma) and the count of Egmont passed through Bordeaux on their way back from meeting with Philip. To meet them, Charles dispatched the count of Mirandola and Catherine for her part, the governor of Bordeaux, the comte d'Escars. In the hopes of showing the men that justice was active in Bordeaux, a man was hanged but the deed was performed just before the arrival of these ambassadors.

Easter had come around again, and Charles and Catherine repeated the public piety they had demonstrated in Troyes the year previous. On 19 April alone they frequented around a dozen churches. Charles distributed alms to the poor, to the delight of the Catholics. On Easter day itself, 22 April, the king took communion in the cathedral of Saint-André.

Montmorency, for his part, oversaw the kidnapping of a child baptised as a Protestant, so that they might be re-baptised a Catholic. Brantôme records Montmorency as having a brutal disregard for the bourgeois of Bordeaux. He states that when the captain de Strozzi requested a source of firewood off him, so that his men might have heating, he requisitioned a 300 tonnes boat of the people of Bordeaux to serve as the fuel. Remonstrated with by the jurats, he threatened them by suggesting they were lucky it was not their houses he was taking as firewood.

Álava complained to Catherine about the activities of the governor of Bayonne, the vicomte d'Orthe, charging him with tormenting subjects of Philip II with the corsairs based out of his city. While the court spent time in Bordeaux, Catherine resolved upon the list of courtiers who would participate alongside her at the meeting with the Spanish at Bayonne.

On 22 April, Charles declared to Álava that he would like to speak with him as he had not had such an opportunity while in Bordeaux. Therefore, could the ambassador be present for church that evening, and Mass the following day. Catherine then summoned Álava to the gardens, where she was. She stated to the ambassador she well knew that he was upset with her. Charles arrived and inquired as to the reasons for Álava's frustration. The Ambassador responded that Spanish subjects were being held in captivity in France. Matters then turned to religion. Champion states that Catherine assured Álava she intended to punish the Protestant ministers, as they had violated the edict of Amboise through their hosting of synods and assemblies. Álava is to have responded sceptically, noting that she was full of 'good words' but delivered precious little. Catherine took umbrage at this, but Álava doubled down, dismissing her protests concerning the role of the plague in Lyon for her failure to act then, noting that the plague was in fact that of the souls she had damned by her failure to move against the Protestants. Charles' crown was thus in danger. Charles noted to Álava that he could now pick up the relic of Saint-Eugène, which had been deposited in the cathedral of Bordeaux. Álava declined, noting that as a priest, Manrique de Lara was a more suitable candidate to pick up the relic. Charles assured him that this donation was an indication of his affection for the Spanish monarch.

The Spanish ambassador reported on an episode that transpired in Bordeaux. The king, keen to practice his dance before the interview of Bayonne had taken to practice privately. The seigneur de Méru had inveigled himself into witnessing this practice, hiding himself behind a curtain. Méru was uncovered and chased out by Charles who was furious. Méru believed he had been betrayed by the young duc de Guise and went to locate him. Guise was liaising with the duc d'Orléans at this time. Méru opined that if anyone other than the king had chased him in that way, he would have stabbed them in the chest. Orléans rejoindered that if he had caught Méru in that situation, he would have had him defenestrated. The duc de Guise agreed with the duc d'Orléans, opining that if Méru intended to implicate him by what he had said, he would have him punished. The constable de Montmorency, upset by this episode in which his son had been threatened, made as though he wished to leave court for Chantilly, but soon he calmed down. Champion sees this episode as revealing of Orléans' character, prone to extreme emotional outbursts. Chevallier finds in the episode, a revealing insight into how closely the ambassador Álava followed court affairs.

While in Bordeaux, Charles wrote to the governor of the Picard town of Péronne (a key border town with the Spanish Netherlands), a certain d'Humières. D'Humières was instructed to return to the city of his charge, if he were not there upon receipt of the letter, and then stay there to watch the border until Charles permitted him to do otherwise.

Concerned about the possibility of the Order of Saint-Michel's prestige becoming diluted, in April, Charles paused intakes to the Order until such time as the membership had declined to fifty men.

The court was plagued by rain during its stay in Bordeaux. They made their departure for Bayonne on 3 May. At this time, serious financial problems were troubling the court. In additions to the Bayonne expenses, Catherine needed to pay the Swiss mercenaries, and the various pensionaries of the crown. It was attempted to raise loans in Lyon. Nevertheless, the pensions of the duke of Ferrara and Count Palatine of the Rhine were reduced. Their representatives in the French court were inflamed by this and threatened to depart.

=== Mont-de-Marsan ===
Having left Bordeaux on 3 May, the court lunched at nearby Montplaisir, taking the night at the château de Castres. On 4 May, the court could be found at Langon on the banks of the Garonne. Having made an entry into Bazas on 5 May, the court watched a bullfight here the next day. From Bazas the next day, the court crossed the Ciron river by the bridge at Beaulac. The night was spent at Captieux. On 8 May, the court took their lunch at Les Traverses, arriving that evening in Roquefort, the city affording the royal party an entry.

The court moved on to Mont-de-Marsan, where they would pause for the next fifteen days. The accommodation afforded to Charles and Catherine here was poor, and occasioned complaint from them. It was here where the rumour spread that Catherine's daughter, the queen of Spain, would not be coming to Bayonne for the interview. On 17 May, the French crown granted the town of Saint-Yrieix the privilege of a consulate and mayor.

While in Mont-de-Marsan, the vicomté d'Uzès (viscounty of Uzès) was erected into a duché in favour of the comte de Crussol, who become the duc d'Uzès. Nicoll sees the decision to do so at this moment as a sign of restored unity, as well as an effort to further tie his loyalties (and faith) to the crown. Should he and his brothers die without heirs, the lands (which boasted a revenue of 10,000 livres a year) would revert to the crown. He was granted judicial privileges over the territory.

During the stay of the court in Mont-de-Marsan, a rumour spread of an association the associates of the Lorraine-Guise family had manufactured that was aimed towards the ruin of the house of Montmorency. Catherine had little patience for the formation of leagues and moved to receive a declaration from the assembled gentlemen endorsing the ban on leagues. Sournia characterises this declaration as a counter-league to maintain balance in the royal court through the protection of the Montmorency. Jouanna describes the effort at Mont-de-Marsan as an attempt to circumvent the local Catholic leagues in the kingdom, by having the king put himself at the head of a national Catholic league called the association du roi under which all existing leagues would be absorbed. She dates this episode to a council meeting on 18 May. Copies of the treaty were sent out to the various governors of the kingdom, so that they might swear a solemn oath to observe it. Daussy ascribes the credit for this initiative to the seigneur de Monluc. The constable himself was not at Mont-de-Marsan and could thus not drive endorsements of the project. Alongside Catherine's signature on this document was that of the seigneur de Monluc. These signatures were viewed with suspicion by the Protestants.

On 23 May, before a full royal council, Catherine reaffirmed her commitment to the edict of Amboise and noted anyone who defied or tried to undermine it was a traitor.

This stasis concluded on 24 May, as the court passed through Meilhan, where lunch was enjoyed, and finished the day in the village of Tartas, which straddled the Douze river and offered an entrye to the king. On 28 May, the court made their way through Pontonx, crossed the Adour river, and arrived at Dax. The progress to Dax was a fraught one, the court experiencing a drought in updates concerning Élisabeth's progress from their ambassador in Spain Saint-Sulpice.

As the court progressed through the south-west of the kingdom, Charles was struck by the number of destroyed church and châteaux he encountered.

In May 1565, the prince de Condé entered Paris. To the scandal of many Parisians, he conducted public Protestant preaching in the city. The admiral de Coligny was also in the capital at this time. The presence of these two men seemed to be of little concern to the governor of Paris, the maréchal de Montmorency. A Spanish informant reported to the Spanish ambassador at this time that all the Protestant leadership was to be found in the capital with an army, at the very moment of the Bayonne interview. Condé followed up this visit to Paris by making for his government of Picardy, which was on the border with Spain. This was much to the alarm of the governor of the Spanish Netherlands, Margaret.

The Spanish ambassador believed that the Catholics of Paris, fearful of the successes of Protestantism, had invited Charles to come to the capital during June, offering him a large sum of money to do so.

=== Bayonne ===
The final approach to Bayonne was made by Charles by boat. The king embarked at Saubusse and his flotilla made its way down the Adour to Bayonne. On route they stopped at the Île de La Honce to take lunch. On 3 June, Charles IX arrived in Bayonne to make his entry into the place for the interview.

Having received a petition in June relating to a site of Protestant worship in the Île de France, Catherine indicated that the court would look into the matter when it had returned to Paris. Upon the death of the seigneur de Burie, his co-lieutenant-general for Guyenne, the seigneur de Monluc was established by letters patent of 11 June as the vice-admiral of Guyenne and lieutenant-general of the totality of Guyenne. It was by virtue of these two offices he held that he would accompany the court for the Bayonne conference.

During June, the seigneur de Monluc wrote a long memoir to Philip about the state of religion in the French kingdom as it related to the tour. Charles' strength and Catholicism were daily growing and witnessed by the Catholics they passed on the journey with joy. Along with the court, he was undertaking solemn religiosity in all places they visited. Monluc outlined suspected Protestant plans to turn Lyon into a Swiss canton, something Catherine had disrupted during the courts time there. He explained the queen mother would soon be heading on to the rebel city of La Rochelle, where she would build another citadel to cow the Protestants. He foresaw that in Saintonge the court would encounter a uniform Protestant nobility. He noted that destroying the Protestants and building up the royal party simultaneously would inspire opposition, and therefore the focus was on building the strength of the crown. Once back in Paris, the edict of Amboise would be abrogated, Charles asserting himself as an adult, and male, ruler whose religion would be obeyed. To best assure matters, especially given the malfeasant actions of the chancellor who daily supported the Protestants, he advised Philip give all signs of friendship to Charles at Bayonne.

The courts time in Bayonne was split between ostentatious celebrations, and negotiations between the French and Spanish. Catherine hoped to make progress on several marriage negotiations for her children. The duke of Alba, who stood in for Philip, pushed for the French to adopt a tougher policy against the Protestants, proposing the liquidation of the senior Protestant leadership. Catherine's daughter, Élisabeth, offered her support for the position of Alba and Philip on this matter, to Catherine's frustration. No conclusive deal was struck, though Catherine may have made a nebulous commitment on potential future changes to religious policy. Her promises were held in a great deal of scepticism, though among the Protestants who had been excluded from the meeting, fearful rumours swirled that a plan for their elimination had been reached.

Leaving Bayonne, the two sides remained together to the point of Saint-Jean-de-Luz, where Charles made a tearful goodbye to Élisabeth. Catherine, and the duc d'Orléans, accompanied Élisabeth further (across the border into Spain), while Charles remained behind. Back in Saint-Jean-de-Luz, Charles distracted himself from his sadness with dancing and hunting.

From Saint-Jean-de-Luz, the court embarked on the Adour taking their lunch at the small place of Urt, before moving on to Bidache the château of the comte de Gramont. The heat at this time was so intense that men and horses both collapsed with heatstroke. It was resolved to travel during the night due to the intense heat while traversing Béarn. They then made for Biarritz on 11 July. On 13 July they were to be found in Peyrehorade, then the next day the court was back in Dax.

=== Mont-de-Marsan ===
Back in Dax on 14 July, the city's ardent Protestantism was of concern to Catherine. Champion notes that while the court was in Dax the cardinal de Bourbon had to lodge with a married canon. Charles became angry when the Protestants came to him to ask for permission to preach. This was critiqued by the seigneur de Lanssac, who argued Charles should listen to all his subjects. Catherine did not permit the Swiss ambassadors who had come to meet with the French court to enter the city.

Leaving Dax on 17 July, the night was passed at Tartas. The next day the court returned to Mont-de-Marsan for a second time. It was here that the alliance between France and the Swiss cantons was affirmed, their deputies having come to this place a feast was duly held. The seigneur de Damville undertook a covert meeting with the Spanish ambassador Álava here. Damville arranged it such that they would appear to meet by chance while out on the country. Undertaking this meeting as instructed, Álava was met by Damville, who affirmed his loyalty to the (Spanish) King and the Catholic cause. Álava was warned by Damville that he had to be careful of what he wrote in his correspondences with Philip, as there were Protestant spies on both sides of the frontier who might seize on the information. He confided in Álava that he had been secretly promised the office of maréchal by Charles and Catherine during the Bayonne conference. He was to keep this a secret for the moment, and visit his government, before making on to Paris where the kingdom would be divided into four military governorships under the overall authority of the constable de Montmorency, with he taking responsibility for Languedoc and Guyenne. Summarising the broader conclusion of the Bayonne meeting, he characterised the agreement as being to form a league which would divorce France from the Ottomans, and the purging the kingdom of France of Protestantism.

With the Spanish gone, Catherine could afford a greater liberality towards the queen of Navarre. The latter figure was permitted to return to her territory of Nérac, the capital of the duché d'Albret. Catherine hoped to go Nérac herself. The court passed through Cazères on the Adour on 23 July, then entered Nogaro the next day. The night of 25 July was taken at Eauze. On 26 July the French court arriving at Montréal where they hoped to sooth the unrest in the place. On 27 July the court was in Condom.

=== Nérac ===
On 28 July, the court arrived at the Albret capital of Nérac, thereby uniting with the queen of Navarre for the second time in the tour's progress. To avoid having to meet with the queen of Navarre, the Spanish ambassador Álava went instead to Bordeaux and then to Cognac where he would link back up with the court. In the meeting of the queens at Nérac, which lasted from 28 to 31 July, Catherine worked to gain a greater tolerance for Catholicism in Jeanne's territories. The queen mother reproached the queen of Navarre for not working with her to see Charles well obeyed in the kingdom. Chevallier notes that for Jeanne, toleration of Catholicism was to tolerate idolatry. Jeanne could not be moved in regards to Béarn, but for Nérac, and the duchy of Albret of which it was capital, where the laws of the French kingdom applied, she made concessions concerning Catholic worship. Jeanne secured a victory of her own with permission granted for her to take her son, the prince de Béarn, from the court into her custody on a temporary basis. Sournia suspects the two would have discussed the seigneur de Monluc, who, in his capacity as the lieutenant-general of Guyenne was a considerable thorn in the side of the queen of Navarre by his clamping down on Protestant proselytising. For this same reason, Monluc was an asset to Catherine. While the monarch's talked religion, the prince de Béarn competed in archery with the duc de Guise and Charles IX.

United with her son, Jeanne introduced him to the militant Protestants: first among them the young boy's uncle, the Protestant prince de Condé, whom she hoped to see redeemed after he had fallen into error. In August, the mother and son met with a general staff of Protestant leaders in Cognac. After touring some of the family's estates, they reunited with the court at Blois.

The seigneur de Lanssac headed out in front of the French court to La Rochelle at the start of August. There he assembled the notables of the place and begged them to abide by the edict of Amboise and clamp down on the defiance of the edict in the city. In this city, the Catholic clergy was regularly attacked by the Protestants. Lanssac highlighted the great love Catherine and Charles had for La Rochelle, and their desire to see Catholics and Protestants at peace in the city. The pastors of La Rochelle were to be moderate in their sermons and not preach invective towards the other faith.

On the first day of August, Catherine and the queen of Navarre travelled to Buzet, where they spent the night. The river Garonne was crossed at Tonneins on 2 August by the court. From Tonneins the court began its journey to Bergerac on 3 August, passing through Verteuil that day and Lauzun the next. On Sunday 5 August, the daughter of the seigneur de Lauzun was baptised Charlotte-Catherine.

Departing Lauzun on 8 August, the court crossed the Dordogne by a covered wooden bridge and Charles IX made an entry into Bergerac, the principal city of Périgord. They would not tarry long in Bergerac, and already on 9 August the court cooled its heels at the château de Laugat. On 10 May, Mussidan and Ribérac in turn, before pausing briefly at Roche-Beaucourt for 11 and 12 August. Lunch was taken at a house called Tour Garnier outside Angoulême on 13 May with the king entering that city the following day.

== Angoumois ==
=== Angoulême ===
Though a fairly Protestant city, the governor the seigneur de Lanssac had compelled the people to go out and greet the king with banners and crosses. The seigneur de Lanssac had also been entrusted with a more general responsibility for ensuring the security of the royal party during their stay in Saintonge. This would be accomplished, and the court was untroubled while in that province. The king entered the city of Angoulême prepared for confrontation, as he had been warned to anticipate a repeat of the conspiracy of Amboise.

An excursion from Angoulême on 16 August saw the king visit nearby Touvre, the source of a tributary of the Charente. The river was rich with fish, and Charles had the fishermen pursue their profession before him. The king took his lunch under a tree by the river. While the king was in Angoulême, he was beseeched by the Protestants who complained of the violence they remained subject to. Specifically, on 16 August, he was subject to a harangue from a certain François de Boucard. Boucard delivered a bold speech, in which he suggested that the nobility might go to arms again if the rumours about the cardinal de Lorraine raising troops were true. He pointed out that the Protestants had for years been massacred as were the kingdom still in a state of civil war. Governors and judicial officials supported those who defied the royal edicts. Further, anti-Protestant leagues were allowed to continue. He ended by beseeching the king as to his duty to prevent such circumstances coming to pass, for they would destroy the edict of Amboise. Boucart's grievance related specifically to the Protestants of Champagne, he having met them on the occasion of the baptism of Andelot's son. Daussy describes the radical nature of Boucard's address, which suggested a contractual monarchy, contingent on certain obligations for the crown.

The king paid respects here at the tomb of his great-great-grandfather, the comte d'Angoulême, who, during the first civil war in 1562, had the head, hands, and feet of his corpse cut off by the Protestants. Charles flew into a rage concerning the deed.

While in Angoulême, Charles looked to resolve a dispute over precedence between the Protestant comte de La Rochefoucauld and the Catholic seigneur de Ruffec.

=== Cognac ===
From Angoulême, to Châteauneuf on 18 August where Charles was granted an entrye. Then the river Charente was crossed by boat before arriving in Jarnac on 21 August, where they were hosted by the baron de Jarnac, a Protestant and the governor of La Rochelle. The seigneur de Lanssac was entrusted with securing an oath of loyalty from the baron de Jarnac. He expressed his confidence in the edict of Amboise. The baron was rewarded by the crown by being made a knight of the Order of Saint-Michel. Charles also assured Jarnac that he would maintain the edict of Amboise. The baron was permitted to maintain his position as governor of La Rochelle.

After Jarnac, the Charente was again crossed on 21 August so that the court might visit Cognac. The court would spend eleven days in this city. Catherine reminisced fondly on the court's time in Cognac to the dowager duchesse de Guise that the weather was very fine, and that Protestants and Catholics had danced together. While the court was cooling its heels in Cognac, the seigneur de Lanssac was entrusted with overseeing the maintenance of the queen of Navarre in her territory, and the prince de Condé in Picardy. To this end he employed the intermediary efforts of the prince de La Roche-sur-Yon.

On 25 August, from Cognac, Charles issued a directive to all the parlements of the kingdom by which he demanded they all comply with the edict of Orléans and mete out punishment on any who might suggest that it was no longer in force. The edict of Orléans supported the coexistence of two faiths within the kingdom, and thus the French crown continued to show itself in favour of religious toleration after the Bayonne conference.

Charles also informed his governors that the only party judges should be a member of, was one of loyalty to him. To do otherwise, was to risk the tranquility of the provinces.

From Cognac on 25 August, the court conducted an excursion to Louzac to take their lunch at the house of the Count Rhinegrave a commander of reiters for Charles. This figures payment by the crown was sporadic.

== Saintonge ==
From Cognac, the court departed on 1 September and entered the province of Saintonge, where their presence gave confidence to the Catholic minority. Chauveau, on the Charente, would be the location selected for their first stop on 1 September. The first major place to be visited was Saintes, where Charles arrived in the afternoon. This place afforded the king an entry. The villages of Saint-Trojan and Le Mesnil followed and were observed with curiosity by the royal party. From Marennes the islands of Oléron could be seen. The king stayed here for a day.

=== Marennes ===
On 5 September Brouage was visited, the causeway through the marshes to reach the place needing to be crossed to access the place. In Brouage, a new port was being constructed. The inhabitants of the town gathered to see the king, and the cannons of the nearby ships thundered. With the presence of the royal court in this deeply Protestant region, the Catholics felt confident enough to celebrate Mass. Jouan recorded the presence of 800-900 persons assembling in the church for the opportunity. On 6 September, grown children were baptised in Marennes, their baptism having been delayed so greatly that they could request receipt of the sacrament from the presiding priest themselves. Charles, having returned to Marennes, served as the children's godfather and they took the names Charles and Charlotte.

From Marennes to Cormeran on 7 September where the court enjoyed their lunch. Then back to Saintes on 8 September, with the king stalling here long enough to witness the Catholic procession the next day. Leaving Saintes, the court lunched at Brizambourg before crossing the Boutonne river. At Saint-Jean-d'Angély Charles was afforded an entrye, and he stayed in the city until 11 September. From here to the château de Poursay where the court dined before crossing into Aunis to take the night at the village of Surgères.

== Aunis ==
=== La Rochelle ===
On 13 September the court lunched at the village of Lajaune before moving on to an abbey in the suburbs of La Rochelle to pass the night. Charles had prohibited the Rochelais from electing their mayor and intended to appoint a Catholic to the role. This was a source of local frustration. The king received the keys of La Rochelle and witnessed a speech delivered in the Saint-Éloi suburb. Standing on a platform before the abbey he watched the companies of soldiers parade by. He then retired to the noble house of Le Fay for the night.

Charles had received dark reports concerning La Rochelle from the baron de Jarnac, and this would inform his approach to his entry into the city. Arriving in La Rochelle ahead of the king, the constable de Montmorency was conscious of the fiercely Protestant character of the city. Montmorency demanded that artillery be removed from the path the royal procession was to take, and further that there be no gunfire salutes. The artillery was to be placed on the meadows of Maubec, which had once hosted Protestant sermons. The Rochelais population resented these demands.

For the king's entry, a silk cord was hung across the road in the king's path at the porte de Cougnes. This symbolic obstacle was intended to allow the mayor to present the gospels to the king so that he might swear on them to uphold the city's privileges before being granted entry. Interpreting this cord as a means to block the king, Montmorency cut it with his sword and demanded to know from the urban magistrates whether they intended to stop Charles from entering their city.

Charles IX entered on horseback and refused a request from the mayor of La Rochelle to declare an oath of his respect for the city's privileges stating instead 'be faithful and loyal subjects and I will be a good king to you'. The canopy under which Charles entered was carried by the aldermen of the city. Triumphal arches for the king celebrated the twelve labours of Hercules. A portrait of the king could also be found upon them. In addition to the arches, scaffolds had been erected which were decorated with tapestries. By the Caille fountain, thirteen 'beautiful young women' could be found dressed in white gowns as the goddess Diana. From here, Charles proceeded to the hôtel de ville. Arriving at his apartments, Charles was presented with a silver basin in the centre of which was to be found a rock.

Charles was beseeched by the Catholics of La Rochelle who complained about their treatment. Charles thus urged the officers to more rigorously apply the edict of Amboise's terms, including urging the magistrates to ensure Mass was celebrated at all the cities churches. Several Protestant pastors were exiled from the city, in addition to the lieutenant-general of the city (who was 'too biased against Catholicism') and some bourgeois. Charles saw the corps de ville reduced from one hundred members to twenty-four. Jarnac's right to select the mayor from among the three finalists selected by the council was affirmed. All cannons were to be given over to Jarnac who would store them in the great tower. The opinion of the Rochelais were hardened by this royal visit, it now appeared the hardline pastors had been right to advocate armed resistance against the crown.

No sooner had the royal party left La Rochelle than Protestant worship resumed in the city. Several months after the king's departure, the exiled pastors were welcomed back into the city. Álava was of the opinion violence against Catholics in the city actually increased after Charles' departure.

Departing from La Rochelle, the court passed through first Benon and then Mauzé-le-Riche where the night of 18 September was spent.

== Poitou ==
=== Niort ===
The next day the court passed through Frontenay-le-Battu on the periphery of Poitou before arriving at the city of Niort.

Entering Niort on 19 September, the city heard its first Mass in seven years with their arrival. It was announced that if the priests of Niort were endangered, the richest Protestants of the city would answer for it.

While in Niort, Condé arrived at the court. He announced his marriage to the seventeen-year-old Protestant princess Françoise d'Orléans, a choice Catherine approved of. She therefore requests the marriage transpire at court, even though both parties were Protestant. For the occasion of the marriage, Protestants at the court would be permitted to conduct Protestant worship there, though it would have to be behind closed doors.

The recently arrived Condé, and the constable de Montmorency almost came to blows, but the assembling of the conseil privé cooled passions. At this time, a highway robber named Simon de May, who had been accused of attempting to assassinate the admiral de Coligny, was ordered put to death.

The Protestant seigneur de Soubise, came to meet with the king at Niort, bringing in tow a 'fine band' containing many of the greatest nobles of Poitou.

=== Thouars ===
Leaving Niort, on 20 September the court lunched at Échiré where a stone bridge across the river Sèvre could be found. The night was spent at the village of Champdeniers. The next day, lunch was enjoyed upon the Baubarre farm. Parthenay could be seen from the heights. The night was spent at the château de La Rochefatou. The next day, Airvault and Oiron were visited in turn. It was at the latter place that the court paused for two days, as there was a château belonging to the house of Boisy. The seigneur de Boisy, whose family had served as the royal chambrier (chamberlain) received the court at this place. Leaving from Oiron on 25 September, the court made for Thouars, residence of the vicomte de Thouars. The La Trémoille represented the most powerful and wealthy family in Poitou. The king made an entry into the small town of Thouars. The vicomte de Thouars dispatched nine-hundred farmers to meet with Charles. He then hosted a feast for the king. Thouars was married to a daughter of the constable de Montmorency. Therefore, after the lunch, Montmorency could watch with satisfaction as his granddaughter was brought to the baptismal font by king Charles and the queen mother Catherine. She was named Charlotte-Catherine in their honour.

== Anjou ==
Leaving Thouars, Charles returned to Oiron, where dances would go on for three days. The king left on 26 September for Loudun. The next day, lunch was enjoyed at the village of Ceaux with sleep undertaken at the château of the duc de Montpensier, governor of Touraine and Anjou, at Champigny-sur-Veude. Montpensier was a militant Catholic who inspired the enthusiasm of the Spanish ambassador Álava. It was while at Champigny that the day of Saint-Michel was celebrated, as well as the feast of the king's order.

=== Beaupréau ===
On 1 October, the court was to be found eating its lunch at the village of Marçay then sleeping at the manor of Chavigny. The court was in Fontevraud-l'Abbaye on 2 October, then Brézé the next day. The Brézé family, which opened their doors to the court, had served as the royal grand huntsmen. Both Doué and Martigné-Briand were visited on 4 October, the latter playing host to the court's night. On 5 October, the court lunched at Notre-Dame-d'Allençon before ending the day at Brissac, which boasted a large château. Gonnord was also visited before 8 October. Both Chemillé and Jallais were crossed on 8 October with Beaupréau arrived at on either 8 or 9 October. Beaupréau was the residence of the prince de La Roche-sur-Yon. La Roche-sur-Yon was very sick, seeming to be on the verge of death, and Charles declined to participate in the feast he hosted, not wanting to embarrass his former tutor. Instead, Charles took his lunch and night at the nun's abbey of La Regrippière. The prince died the day after the king's visit.

== Brittany ==
After this flurry of places in Anjou the court moved up into Brittany. To the understanding of the Spanish ambassador, Catherine intended to be back in Blois by 20 October. Indeed, Catherine had promised to visit Paris in November to settle religious affairs there. Álava had at this time had enough, experiencing sickness he requested of Philip to relieve him of his office. Catherine meanwhile requested he make for Tours to await the court there.

The province of Brittany boasted several great Protestant nobles, who had done much to spread their faith in the province. The seigneur d'Andelot had married the Protestant Breton heiress Claude de Rieux and worked to install Protestant ministers wherever he was in the region. It was by this means that Andelot had installed a Protestant minister in Nantes. Meanwhile, the vicomtesse de Rohan, Isabelle had transformed her château de Blain into a Protestant fortress.

=== Nantes ===
On 10 October, the court spent the day and night at the town of Le Loroux-Bottereau on the perimeter of Brittany and Anjou. Crossing the Loire on 11 October by boats at the port of La Chubuette they lunched at Thouaré at which a manor house could be found.

Moving on from here, the court arrived at Nantes on the evening of 11 October and would spend the night there. Having waited in the suburb of La Fosse, it would not be until 12 October that Charles made his entry into the great city. With lunch passed, Charles stood on a platform and observed the companies march past him. Mounting his horse, Charles entered the city via the Saint-Nicholas gate and received the keys of the city.

The court would spend three days in Nantes, with the king residing at the château. Charles enjoyed the local dances during his time in the city. Charles would feast with a certain merchant named André Ruiz, who, alongside his son, was a long-term creditor of the crown.

=== Châteaubriant ===
On 15 October, the court departed from Nantes, returning to the house of La Galochette which was proximate to the château de Joué. The following day, the court crossed Moison and arrived at Châteaubriant. At Châteaubriant, the constable de Montmorency possessed a château, at which Charles would stay for eighteen days. Festivities and hunts were held for the occasion of the king's visit. It was from here that he directed commissioners to re-establish Catholic worship in Blain, something the vicomte de Rohan was unable to resist due to his ill-health, and looked to see the Protestants of Nantes granted a site for their worship. Catherine counselled the militantly Catholic governor of Brittany, the seigneur de Martigues towards religious moderation, having intercepted a letter he sent to the duc d'Aumale. This letter apprised her of the anti-Montmorency League Martigues had established in Brittany. Writing to the maréchal de Montmorency on 30 October, Charles opined that it was not possible for the cardinal de Lorraine to safely travel across France to join with the court at Châteaubriant. The constable de Montmorency supped with Catherine, not eating but rather conversing with the queen mother. While the court was at Montmorency's, All Saints' Day was celebrated.

It was while the court was in Châteaubriant, on 20 October, that they learned of the abandonment of the Ottoman siege of Malta. Overjoyed at the news, Charles ordered the lighting of a large bonfire.

According to the historian Vray, the court would not enter Rennes due to a rivalry between that city and Nantes. Knecht explains the courts failure to visit Rennes and its parlement differently, a response to the 'seditions' that were plaguing the Loire valley. Leaving from Châteaubriant, the court had their lunch at Bourg-Delbret on 2 November, terminating the day at the little château of La Mothe.

== Anjou ==
Before the court arrived back in Anjou, preparations were undertaken for their arrival. The lieutenant-general of Anjou, Maine and Touraine, the seigneur de Chavigny and seigneur de Puygaillard were tasked with cataloguing and resolving as many points of religious tension as they could in anticipation of Charles' appearance. The maréchal de Vielleville also visited Angers in July to assist with the pacification process. The goal here was to present a situation, upon the arrival in Anjou of the court, where the problems had already been resolved. Thus, when the court arrived, they could represent the climax of the pacification, rather than being consumed in a quagmire of difficult negotiations.

On 4 November the court re-entered Anjou, passing through Candé and Le Louroux-Béconnais on 4 November, before spending the night at the latter place.Come 5 November, the court was to be found taking their lunch at La Touche-aux-Anes, arriving outside Angers in the evening.

Charles went first to the abbey of Saint-Nicolas in the suburbs of Angers, and having eaten his lunch, made his entry into the city in the afternoon of 6 November. A review of the garrison and inhabitants of Angers was conducted from a platform before the abbey of Saint-Nicholas. An alderman and a doctor of the university delivered speeches to the king. The aldermen praised the virtues of Charles and Catherine. The municipal officer characterised most harangues to Charles upon his entry as elaborate ways of saying 'welcome', but argued that the meaning was deeper, and Charles was in fact entering their hearts by this process. He would hear their remonstrances, concerning the evil of the toleration of diversity of religion in the kingdom, and the ill-obedience of royal justice. The alderman deplored the poor regard in which royal justice was held. In the absence of firm and absolute justice from above, massacres and killings proliferated. It was the duty of Charles to remedy such disorders. Yet, even if Charles approached the situation with gentleness, he would find himself well obeyed in Angers. The Académie d'Anjou addressed L'Hôpital in Latin, seeing in him a spirit of burning justice. Chevallier describes their reception here as very cordial and generous. A painting of Hercules vanquishing Cerberus could be seen at porte Chapellière accompanied by poetic verses. Hercules, the moderate and prudent vanquisher was thus analogised to king Charles. Specifically, Charles was compared to the Gallic Hercules, whose power derived from his word. A two-year-old child wielding a sword also played a part in the reception, embodying the virtue of justice. This child is to have delivered a brief harangue.

The court would only tarry in Angers for two days, the role of Chavigny and Puygaillard in resolving points of conflict having largely been successful. After Angers, departed post-lunch on 7 November, the night was spent at Le Verger.

The court would pause at Le Verger, spending the day of 8 November there at the house of the prince de Guéméné, who could boast a fine château. On 9 November the court lunched at Lézigné, then, crossing the Loire at the Durtal bridge, where they arrived at the château of the maréchal de Vielleville. Having spent two days at Durtal, the court moved on, on 12 November, lunching at Jarzé, before passing the night at Baugé. On 13 November, the court lunched at Mouliherne, before spending the night at the château of La Ville-aux-Fourriers. The final stop in Anjou was stayed at from 14 to 19 November, Bourgueil. Here, Catherine lodged at the Bourgueil Abbey. The queen mother wrote enthusiastically to the duchesse de Guise on the beauty of Bourgueil. Here, they were guests of the cardinal de Guise. With Anjou seeming pacified, the court moved into Touraine.

== Touraine ==
The court enjoyed their lunch at Ingrandes on the border of Anjou and Touraine on 19 November, taking the night at the village of Langeais, from which all the inhabitants had emerged to greet Charles upon his arrival bearing handfuls of straw as a sign of their loyalty to their lord. The next day, lunch at Maillé, before the court then crossed the Loire here and reached the château du Plessis-lès-Tours, the old château of King Louis XI which played host to Charles.

On 21 November, Charles mounted a horse so that he might watch a parade of the various flourishing trades of the city and notables parade before the king, who had come out from Tours. In addition to the various notables of the city, the court was greeted by the famed poet Pierre de Ronsard who was met with in the priory of Saint-Cosme, in a suburb of Tours. In a eulogy delivered to the king, the dual importance of justice and piety were emphasised. It was hoped that through Charles' benevolence his subjects would live in unity. Ronsard credited Catherine as the one who had cast war and discord from the state. Charles returned that night to Plessis to rest.

At dawn on 22 November, bugles and tambourines rang out. The houses of the city were decorated with carpets. Charles made his approach to the city around noon, observing a triumphal arch on the porte de La Riche which bore a rendition of fate spinning silk, one of the chief crafts of the city. Opposite fate was Vulcan who represented arms manufacturing, the other chief craft of Tours. Taking a place atop a platform, Charles watched the procession. Cannons and arquebuses fired, and trumpets sounded. The mayor of Tours presented the keys of the city to him and delivered a harangue. In addition to the procession of soldiers were to be found the silk spinners, dressed in crimson satin doublets, the arms manufacturers, and the other trades of Tours. The rearguard of the procession was taken up by the Basoche of Tours. They were to be found dressed in the 'Turkish' style, robes of yellow and purple taffeta, swords at their sides and arrows in their quivers. They bore signs bearing Charles' coat of arms. Descending from his platform, Charles reviewed the Swiss guard and the company of the prévôt maréchal (provost marshal). Under the canopy, he entered Tours followed by his brother the duc d'Orléans and the nobility. Arriving at the carroy des chapeaux a theatre shaped arch adorned with paintings. As Charles passed by the people of Tours they gave him blessings. Before the Cathedral of Saint-Gatien, the archbishop of Tours delivered a harangue to Charles. The king dismounted to hear it. It was hoped by the church that piety and justice would return, as promised by Charles' mottos. The king entered the church, before continuing through the city to the church of Saint-Martin. The evening was drawing in quickly, and Charles soon returned for the night to Plessis.

In an audience with the Spanish ambassador Álava on 22 November, the first time the ambassador had met with Charles since Bayonne, Catherine, who had summoned Álava for the meeting, showered the Ambassador with questions concerning Philip and Élisabeth. Charles' conversation with Álava was short and polite. Álava expressed Philip's satisfaction, something that brought forth assurances from Charles that he would do more that would please Philip. Catherine then asked Álava to withdraw, stating that because of the heat an audience was impractical and they should try again the next day. Álava returned the next day, meeting Charles surrounded by his court. Charles assured him of his friendship once more, to the discomfort of the Protestants around him. Álava indicated it was in fact Catherine he wished to speak with, and the Ambassador was led to her chambers. Álava opened the conversation with a discussion of the colonial affair of Florida.

At some point around this time, Álava was informed that Catherine had collapsed into unconsciousness while leaving church, but having been brought round, returned to her active self.

Reporting back to Philip II, Álava painted a sorry picture of the French kingdom. In his mind, the only clergy who were in residence at their benefices were the Protestant and atheistic ones. Those clergy considered to be Catholic failed to act against the Protestants for fear of violating the edict of Amboise. By their lack of zeal, they inspired the atheists and emboldened the Protestants. No child wished to go on to become a cleric. The benefices themselves were poor, further disincentivising the clergy. The Ambassador claimed to have witnessed a barren service and procession, which attracted almost no participation, with the majority of the people remaining outside in the square. Elaborating on the Protestants ministers in France, he divided them into four categories, describing their various facets. One group were the ministers to the great nobility, who he classified as superintendents. A second worked in the towns, encouraging and rallying the faithful. Some fomented heresy, distributed pamphlets and whispered advice in the ears of Coligny and Condé, the final group were the most wretched in Álava's opinion, operating in the house of Navarre, providing intelligence to Condé and Coligny, while extracting money from the poor people for the further development of heresy. Concerning the conseil privé he conceded the presence of a few good people on the body, but derided most of those in the council as an affront to the Catholic religion, consumed with personal aggrandisement and affronts. Concerning the army, Protestant soldiers were as numerous in the companies commanded by Catholics as those by Protestants. They enjoyed comfort at the expense of the people they exploited. Efforts were underway to negotiate the amount of payment they were owed by the crown down. As for the garrisons they were both poorly armed and poorly paid, though the latter was being looked into Álava conceded. The Ambassador reported that brigandage was to be found on the roads from Paris to Orléans. On the subject of the greats, he recorded an episode in which the constable de Montmorency had departed the tour, supposedly to meet with his nephew the cardinal de Châtillon. Álava reported that the rumour was that the constable had assured him that his sword stood by his Protestant relatives, even though his heart belonged to god. The ambassador did not believe this though, understanding Montmorency to be a Catholic.

In July, disorders had erupted in Blois, with several Protestants killed and several hundred more driven out. This matter had come before the royal council, then on the tour. A royal councillor suggested it was necessary to determine who the instigator was. To this, L'Hôpital responded that it was surely the Catholics, and Charles responded that it was the Protestants. It was resolved to send the maréchal de Vielleville ahead to Blois to take the appropriate measures pending Charles's arrival, at which the king would demonstrate his Catholicity.

From Tours, the court departed abruptly for La Bourdaisière, the home of the seigneur de La Bourdaisière, who was master of the royal wardrobe. From here to Catherine's residence in Chenonceaux for three December days, where she played host to her children. From here on to Amboise, the childhood home of the royal children.

== Orléanais ==
=== Blois ===
From here the court made for Blois where the court cooled its heels from 5 to 14 December. To the dismay of the Spanish ambassador, here, the prince de Béarn and queen of Navarre returned to the court. Similarly did the other leading Protestants such as the dowager duchess of Ferrara, the comte de La Rochefoucauld, the prince de Porcien, the duc de Bouillon, and the duc de Longueville. The English ambassador reported on 10 December that the Protestants anticipated the imminent abrogating of the edict of Amboise, and that they would need to assume arms; the Catholics meanwhile hoped Charles and Catherine would declare that only Catholicism would be tolerated in France. The queen of Navarre's arrival was the occasion of a scandal, due to the Protestant preaching she undertook in her apartments at the court. The English ambassador reported that Jeanne quarrelled with her brother-in-law the cardinal de Bourbon, who argued that she was in violation of the edicts by preaching at court. The queen of Navarre defended herself, arguing that to do so had been permitted by Charles at Lyon, and that she, the duchess of Ferrara, and the prince de Condé were allowed to preach in the court with the doors closed and to their domestics only. Catherine and Charles entreated with the queen of Navarre but she held firm, and thus all from the court and town were forbidden from entering her lodgings with guards placed at the doors to her quarters.

On 14 December, Charles departed Blois. A petition soon arrived to him from the Protestants of Orléans. They requested that the permitted number of ministers be raised from six to twelve, due to the great number of Catholic priests in the city. That they be permitted to run hospitals for poor youth as did the Catholics, and that they be permitted to collect alms for the feeding and educating of young boys and girls. The Catholics opposed these concessions, and Charles would likewise reject them. Of the understanding the Protestant alms were intended for nefarious ends, he ordered them distributed by Catholics.

On the night of 14 December, the court rested at Cheverny, home to the château of the Hurault family. Philippe Hurault was currently a master of requests, he would go on to become chancellor of France during the reign of Charles' brother. The next day the court lunched at Mur-de-Sologne and took the night at Romorantin.

== Berry and the Bourbonnais ==
16 December was a Sunday, and the court took their lunch at Mennetou-sur-Cher before finishing the day at Vierzon. The new week began with lunch at Mehun-sur-Yèvre, the next day, 18 December, the night was passed at the city of Bourges. Bourges was not tarried at long, the court moving on to first Saint-Just (for lunch) and then Dun-le-Roi on 19 December. The next day, lunch at Pont-Chargy and the night at the village of Couleuvre. 21 December, lunch at Franchesse, sleep in an abbey at Saint-Menoux. Departing from here on 22 December, the court passed through Souvigny, which served as the equivalent of the Basilica of Saint-Denis for the Bourbon family. From Souvigny, the court crossed the Allier, and the king made his entry into Moulins on 22 December. The court would reside in Moulins for the next three months, departing in March.

=== Moulins ===
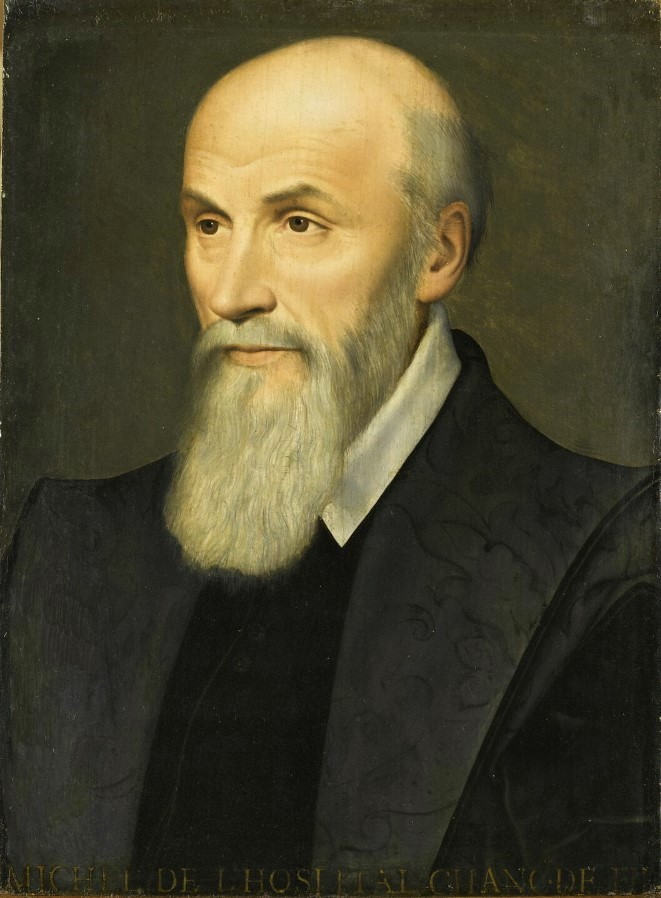
Michel de L'Hôpital, Chancellor of France, and architect of the Grand Ordinance of Moulins

Álava would not be with the court for its entry into Moulins, having stayed instead in Orléans where he was ill. Going forward, he would be the only ambassador to reside in Moulins with the court after its arrival, even as he continued to suffer from illness. The English and Portuguese ambassadors were to be found in Paris, and the others were put up five leagues outside Moulins. The chancellor L'Hôpital would not come directly to Moulins with Charles and Catherine, instead stopping on his estates at Vignay for some days.

The return of the admiral de Coligny, and the Protestants, to the French court, was seen as another act of betrayal by the Spanish. Álava had worked discreetly to try and sabotage the reconciliation between the Châtillon and the Lorraine-Guise.

Moulins would be subject to a rigorous police presence for the duration of the courts stay, akin to that which had governed Bayonne during the royal interview. Going out after midnight was subject to severe restriction and required the carrying of a torch or lantern. Candles would light the town through the night. Pages and footmen were prohibited from bearing arms. Soldiers under the command of the maréchal de Strozzi patrolled the town. Similar patrols were conducted by the great office holders such as the Constable, the maréchaux, and the lieutenant of the prévôt who even covered neighbouring villages in his rounds.

==== Defusing feuds ====
The courts visit to Moulins was the occasion for an attempted reconciliation between the Lorraine-Guise family and the admiral de Coligny. It was the maréchal de Bourdillon who was tasked with laying the groundwork for this operation. To this end, both the cardinal de Lorraine and admiral de Coligny were summoned to attend court. Conspiratorial Protestant fears, which had first been piqued by the Bayonne Conference, were again inflamed by these summonses. It was imagined this was a prelude to the assassination of the Châtillon brothers. Indeed, Champion reports that around this time two men of the duc d'Aumale who were planning to assassinate the seigneur d'Andelot were arrested. At the same moment, Beza came into possession of letters that pointed to an attack against Geneva, thereby destroying the Protestant cantons of Switzerland before moving into France to void the edict of Amboise. This largely turned out to be unsubstantiated rumour.

The cardinal de Lorraine entered Moulins on 10 January, the admiral de Coligny the day after. The cardinal de Lorraine and his brother the cardinal de Guise had arrived a little way outside Moulins on 5 January, and it was the maréchal de Bourdillon who went out to meet with them. The two men, Lorraine and Coligny were lodged in the same hôtel on different floors. Thus, they had to share the same stairway to reach their respective apartments.

Charles gave an audience first to Coligny, and then one to the cardinal de Lorraine. Speaking to the cardinal de Lorraine, Catherine explained that for the sake of the kingdom's peace and affairs, the two private quarrels needed to be resolved: the one concerning the murder of the duc de Guise, the other the quarrel between the cardinal de Lorraine and the maréchal de Montmorency in the wake of the Paris episode of January 1565. Lorraine was urged to facilitate a reconciliation, and it was assured to him that the admiral de Coligny would swear to his innocence, and his view that the killer was a wretch. The cardinal de Lorraine attempted to stall, he complained that he had no written statement prepared, but that he would do his duty to the king. He discussed how he was the guardian of the children of the late duc, and that this was really a case that was more appropriate to be heard before the parlement. Subsequent to this, deliberations began in council. Catherine stated that both Coligny and the cardinal de Lorraine were henceforth responsible for the others wellbeing, an injury to the one would be held against the other.

By letter of 6 January, the maréchal de Montmorency was summoned to Moulins in relation to his feud with the cardinal de Lorraine. He was to come once he had assured himself of the tranquillity of Paris. In his absence from the capital, his younger brother, the seigneur de Méru would be responsible for the city. Upon his arrival, Charles promised the maréchal that the cardinal de Lorraine had assured him he entertained no designs against the Montmorency and was an obedient subject of the crown. In return, Charles asked that the maréchal neither perpetrate any injury, nor order any injury be perpetrated, against the cardinal de Lorraine. The maréchal had considerable reluctance to reconcile with the cardinal de Lorraine, and had to be threatened with disinheritance by his father to make his peace. Reconciled, the two men supped together.

The cardinal de Lorraine made another appearance before the royal council on 29 January, at which twenty-four councillors were considering the matter of Coligny's guilt. The cardinal made appeals to the princes present, highlighting their close kinship to him: Condé and the cardinal de Bourbon were his first cousins; Montpensier a close kinsman; and Nevers, Nemours, and Longueville had all married his nieces. Thus, they had a duty to safeguard his honour as if it were their own. He played upon the fact the Lorraine-Guise family had long been defenders of the princes against the pretensions of the Montmorency. The premier président of the parlement of Paris found Coligny guilty, nineteen of the other councillors found him innocent, and the duc de Montpensier, duc de Nemours and cardinal de Bourbon all sought to recuse themselves from involvement in the matter. That day the verdict was reached, and it was publicly declared that Coligny was found innocent of any involvement in Poltrot de Méré's assassination of the late duc de Guise. This was carried by a vote of nineteen to one, with four abstentions. Only the duc de Nemours refused to sign the declaration, on the grounds of the friendship he bore the house of Lorraine-Guise. Daussy notes that the council was stuffed with the 'king's creatures'. Both parties were cautioned against causing one another any harm, or speaking ill of the other. With great reluctance, this reconciliation was signed to by the cardinal de Lorraine, dowager duchesse de Guise and the admiral de Coligny. At Catherine's request, two days later Coligny was embraced by Lorraine and the dowager duchesse de Guise and they exchanged the kiss of peace. Notably not present for this reconciliation was the young Henri de Lorraine, duc de Guise, who had absented himself on a trip to Hungary to fight the Ottomans.

Champion reports that both the cardinal de Lorraine and duchesse de Guise were considerably embittered by this reconciliation. Meeting with Catherine in the gardens on 2 February, Catherine reassured him as to the value of the agreement he had ascribed to. The cardinal de Lorraine was curt on the matter, noting that all he wished to do was inform the Catholic princes of the resolution and how it was reached, something Catherine protested against. Similarly, the duchesse de Guise, is to have confided in the Spanish ambassador Álava on how she was pressured into making the agreement. She wished to speak on it no more, and only hoped her parents wouldn't abandon her. She bemoaned how unfortunate she was that her surviving sons, the duc d'Aumale and marquis d'Elbeuf were going their own way with little thought to honour or house. The cardinal de Lorraine sung a similar tune to the Spanish ambassador on how his arm had been twisted into coming to terms with his enemies.

Adjoining this dispute was that of the seigneur de Soubise, who had also been implicated in the assassination of the duc de Guise by Poltrot de Méré. He was able to obtain redress for this unproven accusation.

In addition to the reconciliation between Lorraine and Châtillon, the duc de Nevers held out his hand to the prince de Porcien. The two men agreed to forget the differences between them. Porcien's presence had been expressly requested by the king at Moulins, with the monarch even requesting the maréchal de Montmorency permit Porcien to spend a few days in the capital, so that he might discuss affairs with his mother, the Françoise d'Amboise, Countess of Sennighien.

Another festering dispute, that of Françoise de Rohan and the duc de Nemours was also on the king's mind, and he looked to see his ambassador in Rome bring it to the pope's attentions. Françoise had been made pregnant by the duc de Nemours with a promise of marriage, before the latter abandoned her in favour of a pursuit of Anne d'Este (the duc de Guise's widow). This dispute would subsequently be appealed to the pope by Françoise, after the archbishop of Lyon had ruled against her, and the king, all too conscious that it could be quite a time before the pope rendered judgement, hoped to accelerate the judgement. This quarrel was a poisonous one for the king, as Françoise was a cousin of the Protestant queen of Navarre, Jeanne d'Albret. Thus, it soured relations between the Catholic Lorraine-Guise and the Protestant Bourbons. The pope would annul the marriage of Françoise and Nemours, thereby allowing Nemours to marry Anne d'Este on 5 May 1566.

There was also the matter of the conduct of the lieutenant-general of Dauphiné, the baron de Gordes which had been challenged by the Catholic faction of Dauphiné as being partisan towards the Protestants. They had decried him in a petition to the crown, and an agent of his named Briançon was at Moulins to defend his reputation. Briançon enjoyed a successful audience with Catherine on 20 January, and subsequently a successful appearance before the king's council on 8 February in which de Gordes' opponents were left to look ridiculous.

==== Lorraine against L'Hôpital ====
In royal council, the cardinal de Lorraine locked horns with the chancellor, the former desiring to abrogate the edict of Amboise. During January 1566, L'Hôpital sent an edict to the Dijon parlement for their registration. This edict permitted Protestants in towns not allocated for Protestant worship in the edict of Amboise to import Protestant preachers for the education of their children and to console them on their sickbeds. The Dijon parlement baulked at this edict, and they were backed up in a session of royal council of 16 March by the cardinals de Bourbon and de Lorraine. At this time Catherine was unwell and thus absent from the council, and the king was occupied with hunting. L'Hôpital decried the opposition of Lorraine and Bourbon, noting that Lorraine had 'already returned to trouble them' to which Lorraine responded by calling him a rogue, chastising him for ingratitude, owing his position as he did to the Lorraine-Guise. L'Hôpital inquired of the cardinal de Lorraine whether it was his hope to see the Protestants denied any consolation by their pastors, something Lorraine affirmed. In his opinion, ailing Protestants should be seen by Catholic prelates. The chancellor defended the right of Protestants to receive god's word from their own, something Lorraine dismissed, arguing that they would not receive the word of god but rather poison. L'Hôpital pointed out that the Protestants would say that of the Catholic priests. He suggested to Lorraine that the cardinal debate scripture with the Protestants, noting that they were keen to do so, and that this was preferable to trying to lead the kingdom back into civil war. Lorraine responded sarcastically that he was of the understanding he had caused the last civil war, and he had every right to speak freely at royal council. He again reiterated his opinion on Catholic clergy at the bedsides of sick Protestants. This occasioned a new rebuttal from L'Hôpital, who noted the Protestants would never tolerate the Catholic clergy by their bedside, bringing on a new conflict to avoid this situation, and that the Catholic clergy would not deputise Protestant pastors for the job. Another sarcastic remark followed from the cardinal, this time addressed to the cardinal de Bourbon, observing that there was apparently no more need for the Catholic clergy. L'Hôpital continued the attack, charging Lorraine with seeking to ruin the Protestants. Lorraine argued that he was indeed trying to ruin them, as the kingdom should solely follow the Catholic creed. Others on the council were put out by this.

The cardinal de Bourbon inquired if L'Hôpital had pushed through this edict without the cognisance of the royal council. Lorraine and Bourbon then went to find Catherine. Catherine soothed the tempers of the cardinal de Bourbon and Lorraine and dispatched the duc d'Orléans to take over the presidency of the council session. L'Hôpital's edict was struck. By siding against her chancellor in this matter, Catherine allowed herself the position of referee between the sides. Lorraine pressed his advantage too severely, alienating even those who agreed with his position, when he declared that he would no longer attend council in L'Hôpital's presence. L'Hôpital rejoindered that they could manage well without him. On 19 March, Lorraine boasted to Álava that henceforth, L'Hôpital was not to issue any dispatch concerning the Catholic faith without his seeing it first, that the only secretaries permitted to sign off on such writings were the four secretaries of state, and that offices should only be given out to Catholics. Álava dismissively shot back that L'Hôpital had presented the petition of the Protestants of Burgundy to receive a new place to preach, that the Protestant madame de Crussol was now the duchesse d'Uzès, and that a lieutenant of the admiral de Coligny had been received into the order of Saint-Michel.

Beginning in January 1566, the cardinal de Lorraine's agent, a certain monsieur de Vertus, undertook negotiations for the cardinal at the Imperial diet of Augsburg. This would continue until May. Lorraine wanted to come to some form of arrangement with the Emperor and the Catholic princes of the Empire.

==== Municipal and administrative affairs ====
Having been sent a list of candidates for the position of consul of Nîmes by the governor of Languedoc, the baron de Damville, Charles informed him of his choices for the city while he was at Moulins in January. In February, a petition was received from the Protestants of Troyes. Similarly, the Protestants of Grenade requested that worship be restored to their city, it having been moved out to Cormebarrieu while the court was in Toulouse. They were successful and letters patent were issued on 15 February to allow worship from March 1566. The Catholic capitouls, the clergy of Grenade, the cardinal d'Armagnac, and others all voiced their disapproval. Charles relented and agreed with the opponents in March.

Prohibitions on the carrying of firearms were also issued while the court resided at Moulins. On 23 November of 1566, the king wrote to the governors, renewing this prohibition through 1567. Small arquebuses were forbidden across the kingdom. On the matter of royal finances, the admiral de Coligny proposed a cost saving measure by which twenty companies of men-at-arms, which were costing the crown 800,000 ducats to maintain, would be disbanded. It had been resolved to follow this course, but then opinions shifted. Such were the state of royal finances, that the situation was such in certain companies that men had missed thirty pay checks. Álava reported an agreement on 20 February by which the number of financial officials would be thinned from 1,200 to 18 (one for each province of the kingdom). This was to be kept under wraps until the court's departure from Moulins.

Several other pieces of legislation were issued while the court was at Moulins. Firstly, one expanding to other towns the grant that had been made to Paris for a municipal merchant's court. By another law, the funds devolved to municipal authorities were regulated, and municipal assemblies absent an officer from the parlement or other relevant court were prohibited. In another edict, the parameters by which the royal domain might be temporarily alienated in times of emergency were outlined, it required the involvement of the parlement and chambre des comptes, and must be subject to public auction going to the highest bidder. By a further measure, the payment of troops and military supply was put under the control of the council through a system of intendents.

During February, Charles curtailed the size of the conseil privé, relieving over twenty persons from membership of the wider council. However, the practical effects of this are questionable, with dismissed members still appearing in sessions years later.

==== Spanish relations ====
Meeting with the Spanish ambassador Álava on 19 January, the ambassador rounded on Catherine. He bemoaned the state of Catholicism in France. This amused Catherine who gave in to laughing. She defended the internal state of France, noting that matters had improved. Álava challenged this, complaining that the admiral de Coligny had come to court and enjoyed royal favour. This was despite the fact he was plotting against Charles. Catherine asked him to be specific, explain what he had heard concerning plots against her son. Álava moved on to complain about the failure to implement the agreements he believed had been made at Bayonne. Indeed, it seemed despite the grandees assembled at Moulins there was no sign of the edict of Amboise being revoked or even discussed. Catherine argued that it was not possible to revoke the edict of Amboise without plunging the kingdom into civil war. She stated that once she went to Paris, she would deliver what she had told the duke of Alba at Bayonne. She reiterated her desire to avoid civil war.

Catherine informed Álava that she would soon direct her affairs in such a way as Philip would find satisfactory. Further that the plan for the court to make for Lorraine had been abandoned, and the court would now make for Paris. The Spanish ambassador feared that the constable de Montmorency would take the admiral de Coligny with him, and that Catherine might be persuaded to visit the estates of the 'heretic' at Châtillon.

Writing to his Ambassador on 3 February, Álava was congratulated for bringing up to the queen mother the Bayonne agreement and chiding her for the favour the admiral de Coligny enjoyed. As for Catherine's concerns about soldiers he was raising in Germany, Philip hoped it could inspire her zeal for action against the Protestants in France. The recent reconciliation between Coligny and the cardinal de Lorraine was deplored by Philip for 'various reasons'.

On 14 March, while Charles was still weak and bedridden, Álava sought an audience. Catherine had assured him of her son's vitality, thereby causing the Ambassador to request that the audience be in his presence also. Catherine was vexed by this, but assented. Álava again prodded the Mother and Son concerning the Bayonne agreement. Charles responded that it would surely be carried out. The Ambassador asked when this would come to pass. Catherine rejoindered that first the kingdom must be settled, as if the kingdom was not enjoying harmony, then the Catholic religion would be lost. Thus, she looked to disarm and subdue, before she could look to see Catholicism restored. Álava laughed at this, noting the great favour he had seen the admiral de Coligny in, and expounding upon the thousands that had been converted to Protestantism since his arrival at court. Catherine wondered whether Álava truly believed these things he said. Álava replied he didn't need others to tell him it. Catherine bid him closer and inquired whether it was Philip's opinion she should wage war against her own subjects. Álava noted that such a war could start without her, and that there was still time to remain true to what she had assured Philip. The court's visit to Paris would be an opportunity to discuss religion. Catherine further inquired whether Álava truly believed she and her son were under the thumb of the admiral de Coligny. The Ambassador noted that he saw this to be so in the way the Admiral was treated by the king and queen mother. Catherine again reassured Álava of the resolution that would be taken to restore Catholicism. Álava pried for details of what exactly, but the queen mother simply stated that Philip knew she would keep her word. The maréchal de Vielleville was entrusted with delivering much the same message. In a couple of years, Charles would be a man and could organise the affairs of his kingdom. Before this point, matters must be taken with slow caution. Álava little believed this, viewing it as unlikely the court would make for Paris to deliver the religious settlement he believed had been promised.

After this audience, the Spanish ambassador met with the cardinal de Bourbon. He upbraided the cardinal that he was failing to oppose Catherine even as she abandoned the Catholic faith. The cardinal de Bourbon pushed back on this. He argued that Catherine had never conducted herself in a more Catholic fashion than she was now. He admitted the king's enemies were certainly strong. The firm Catholics in the royal council who opposed the edict of Amboise had fallen before the absolute power of their sovereign. He urged Philip to throw his weight behind supporting a marriage between Charles and Elisabeth of Austria.

Speaking with the duchesse de Guise, she assured Álava that soon the trial of the duc de Nemours would be brought to a close, thereby allowing her to marry the man in the same city of Moulins. The cardinal de Lorraine meanwhile begged Álava to report to Philip that Catholicism was all but lost in France, and that the house of Lorraine would fall with it unless succour was provided.

When confronted with assurances that the situation in France was proceeding well, Álava sarcastically quipped that this explained why the assassin of the Catholic governor of Valence, the seigneur de La Mothe-Gondrin had been released from prison. He described it in his writing as a true sign of Catherine's Catholic sympathies.

==== Grand Ordinance ====
While the court tarried in Moulins, an enlarged version of the royal council was assembled in the city. This contained the members of the royal council, the princes du sang, the great officers of the crown, and members of the parlements of the kingdom. For the parlements were the premier présidents of five of the kingdoms parlements (Paris, Bordeaux, Toulouse, Dijon and Grenoble). Also present was the second président of Paris and Aix. Indeed, this gathering is characterised by Cloulas and Pernot as an 'Assembly of Notables' (extraordinary convention of elite power brokers designed to assist in royal decision making). The purpose of this get together was to draft a legislative text, which L'Hôpital had already discussed at the various parlements during the lit de justices the court had been involved with on its travels. This meeting opened on 24 January. with speeches from the chancellor and King. While many grandees were present including the cardinal de Bourbon and duc de Nevers, the prince de Condé was absent on grounds of his health.

It was noted by both L'Hôpital and Charles that during the tour of the kingdom, the king had borne witness to many complaints from his subjects. It was the job of those assembled to remedy these complaints. L'Hôpital noted that having seen his Kingdom, Charles was not afraid to call the thief a thief, wishing to clearly identify the problems in the kingdom. He waxed lyrical about justice in former times (Salmon suggests the reign of Louis IX, noting that even foreigners would come to request it. He saw a shift with the reign of Charles VII, with litigation multiplying. It was not just a matter of returning to a halcyon age though, new problems faced the kingdom that required new solutions. Lawsuits abounded in relation to abbeys and other holy institutions. Looking to the root of the problems as he saw them, L'Hôpital named the multiplication of judicial offices, and the passing of offices to sons who lacked experience. Similarly, the appointment of friends and associates to judicial offices. The king and people needed officials with wisdom and experience, something they were denied by this practice. It was wrong for judicial offices to be handed out to those who knew nothing of them and had simply served the kingdom in war. Justice was also resistant to challenge, with L'Hôpital remarking that he had never seen a case against a judge succeed, for intimidation and mistreatment would be the results of such a challenge. L'Hôpital also chided ambition, the councillor fancying himself a président, the président a chancellor, the cardinal imagining himself a pope. With justices having masters other than the king, they did not fear to denigrate the king to elevate a prince or lord. There were too many présidial courts, yet at the same time, justice was often administered too far away from people. Thus, courts should be mobile, affording greater access to them. Policing of cities should rightly belong in the hands of royal judges, not municipal councillors. The administration of royal justice should be pared back to only laws and edicts, doing away with letters patent. The parlementaires fancied themselves of the right to interpret laws, a prerogative that belonged exclusively to the prince. Charles was to be implored not to provide so many pardons, nor take offence at slights. L'Hôpital expounded upon the poor administration of justice, with pointless judicial offices needing to be suppressed. He further mused whether it might be better for the parlements to receive their payment from the treasury rather than the plaintiffs in the trials they oversaw. L'Hôpital was keen to assert that interpretation of the law belonged solely in the hands of the prince, judicial bodies existed to verify the laws.

These problems were tackled in the ordinance of Moulins. Over the course of eighty-six articles, the king's supreme power was affirmed, and justice reshaped. Pernot describes it as picking up the baton of absolute government that had been carried by king Francis I and Henri II. Covered in the ordinance were the rights of the parlements to remonstrate (after the king had overruled their first remonstrance further remonstrating would not be permitted), the responsibilities of judges, the remits of governors (who had taken advantage of the recent civil war to overstep their prerogatives, and were now removed from matters of tax and law), regulations on hospitals, confraternities, residency requirements for priests, printing and blasphemy. The council gave itself the right to intervene in cases that were stalling out. The nobility was to dutifully answer the arrière-ban, and could lose access to their rights of seigneurial justice if they committed violent acts in their jurisdiction. Nobles who defied the authorities were to lose their fortresses. Clerics guilty of crimes were to first be tried in secular courts. The curtailing of the rights of the parlements to remonstrate would allow the crown to avoid a repeat of the bitter back and forth that had transpired between the court and king over the Edict of Saint-Germain in 1562. The number of présidial courts was cut down, procedures modified, and the appeal process contained and defined. The number of fiscal généralités in the kingdom was cut from seventeen to seven. Some duplicated offices were to be suppressed upon the death of their current holder. The incomes would be distributed among their colleagues, in the hopes this would mollify parlementaire opposition to the provision. To ensure the good behaviour of the governors, who had taken the opportunity of the recent troubles to elevate themselves into power brokers, the maîtres de requêtes de l'hôtel were to undertake expeditions in which they might monitor the governors. The parlements would no longer be able to impose fees on the opposing parties. Judicial officials would have to be more than twenty-five years old and well versed in jurisprudence. Examinations for offices were tightened. Nepotism and pluralism were banned. The governors, prévôts, baillis, and sénéchaux were to ensure the maintenance of the peace and execute the judgements of the courts. As regards the baillis they were to perform their charges in person, on pain of losing their office. In rural areas, vice-bailli and prévôts des maréchaux were empowered to act against all offenders, irrespective of their condition. Municipal courts lost jurisdiction over civil cases, a provision Salmon describes as 'severe'. This was followed by a countervailing provision which established officers in unchartered towns, drawn from the citizenry. Blasphemy was prohibited, as were libels and defamatory writings. The poor laws were reformed, with wardens entrusted with collecting contributions for the poor of their ward under the oversight of mayors and consuls. One could not seek succour as a beggar outside of the parish of their birth. Thus, when medical needs compelled them to go elsewhere, their upkeep remained the responsibility of their parish of birth. Published works would require the approval of the king.

This grand ordinance reaffirmed some prior edicts, such as the prohibition on the carrying of firearms and the inalienability of the royal domain. It was issued during February and bore the signatures of Charles, Catherine, the duc d'Orléans, the chancellor, the cardinal de Bourbon, the prince de Condé, the cardinal de Lorraine, the cardinal de Guise, the duc de Montpensier, the duc de Longueville, the duc de Nevers, the duc de Nemours, the admiral de Coligny, the cardinal de Châtillon, the constable de Montmorency, and three of the maréchaux (Damville, Bourdillon and Vielleville).

When the Paris parlement received this ordinance, they baulked at it. While they recognised some reforms in the package as essential, the restriction if not abolition of venality was deplorable to the magistracy at large. The parlement remonstrated with the king, something they were to follow the processing of with immediate registration, this did not happen. In July, L'Hôpital oversaw the issuing of a range of modifications by the royal council. Eventually the parlementaires were forced to concede to registering the ordinance by 23 December 1566.

The Spanish ambassador held a dismissive view of the legislative works produced at Moulins.

This grand ordinance would serve as the basis for royal justice for the next two centuries. As it stood in the immediate wake of its registration, Knecht describes it as having been a 'dead letter', but notes that it would be a launching pad for future reform efforts. Salmon contrasts the edict with the earlier edict of Orléans, crediting that of Moulins with a greater specificity of policy. Despite this, he concurs that the edict had little practical effect immediately.

Invigorated by the positive reception of the ordinance of Moulins, Catherine's ambitions grew for further reform. She looked to reform finance, cutting through all the current fiscal officials to establish one trésorier for each of the 18 provinces of the kingdom. To this end maps of each province were commissioned, by the geographer Nicolas de Nicolay however only a handful would be completed. The maps relating to the Bourbonnais, Berry, and Lyon survive.

==== Apanage and reward ====
On 8 February, as a reward the roles he had played during the grand tour, Catherine resolved to grant appanages to her second surviving son, as well as to her youngest. Thus, Charles gave to his brother the duc d'Orléans (Henri), the titles of the duc d'Anjou, Bourbon, Maine, Auvergne, as well as various other titles like that of Forez. He would be known by the title duc d'Anjou until his ascent to the French throne in 1574. The new duc d'Anjou was relieved of his title of duc d'Orléans, the traditional appanage of the second royal son, as this city had gained a reputation as a capital of Protestantism in France. The former duc d'Anjou (François) was made duc d'Alençon and further granted the cities of Melun and Mantes. He would be known by the title the duc d'Alençon until 1576 when he acquired the title of duc d'Anjou for a second time. Prior to his elevation as duc d'Alençon he had held the title of duc d'Anjou, but this was now transferred from him to his elder brother. In addition to these considerable incomes, which afforded him around 100,000 livres a year, the new duc d'Anjou entered the royal council. On account of his being only a fifteen-year-old child, while he would enjoy the incomes, he would not for the present actually administer his new domain. The locations of these appanages was deliberately chosen to be in the centre of the kingdom, to avoid the possibility of them bringing about a dismemberment of the kingdom. It was also affirmed contemporaneously to their granting that the royal domain was inalienable and that the apanages would revert to the crown in the absence of an heir for the princes. It was also at the king's discretion to increase or decrease the size of the appanage Anjou and Alençon enjoyed. This assertion of monarchical supremacy over the princes' appanage, which formed a component of the letters of their granting, was registered by the parlement on 20 March.

The governor of Languedoc, the seigneur de Damville, also came in for reward. He was made a maréchal de France. His appointment to this position had been discussed as early as 29 July 1565, when the duc d'Orléans had written to Damville, asking him to establish one of his servants as a commissaire ordinaire des guerres (ordinary commissioner of war), a post that would be subordinate to Damville upon his creation as maréchal. Damville's appointment infuriated the vicomte de Martigues who promptly departed from Moulins.

==== Montmorency offices ====
A confrontation also occurred on the day of Damville's promotion between the prince de Condé and constable de Montmorency. Condé indicated that as a prince du sang he could give command to all four of the maréchaux. The constable de Montmorency shot back that he could command all France. This outraged Condé, who asserted he enjoyed no authority over a prince du sang, he suggested the Constable try to exercise command in Picardy and see how that went for him. Montmorency pointed out the authority over the kingdom he had enjoyed during the reigns of Charles' father and grandfather, including command of the princes du sang, and Condé reconciled with him.

The Montmorency clan now enjoyed a great hold over the military. Montmorency himself possessed the office of Constable, his nephews held the office of admiral and colonel-general of the French infantry, and his two eldest sons the offices of maréchal. The ageing Constable looked to see his third eldest, the seigneur de Méru granted a military office of his own. He hoped first to extract the office of grand-master of the artillery from d'Estrées but the latter figure would not yield it. Likewise, Andelot made it clear he would not surrender the office of colonel-general of the French infantry to his cousin. When, the marquis d'Elbeuf died later that year, Montmorency hoped that Méru might receive his post of General of the Galleys, however this charge went to the baron de La Garde.

Condé was greatly desirous to enjoy the succession to the office of Constable upon the death of Montmorency. Montmorency for his part was keen to have survivorship of the office transferred to his eldest son. Catherine could not brook this, and in the hopes of soothing Condé on the matter one of his territories was elevated to the ducal peerage of Enghien in his favour during 1566.

==== Anjou ====
Writing to his sovereign on 20 February, the Spanish ambassador noted that the young duc d'Anjou spoke with 'too much frequency' with the admiral de Coligny and the queen of Navarre. He further argued Anjou had no Catholic servants, and while his attendance at Mass had been studious in prior years, it was now quite the opposite. Álava raised this matter with the queen mother. In response to these concerns, Catherine demurred, noting that her sons went to mass and were good Catholics.

Anjou was greatly desirous, around this time, to be sent to Spain for the occasion of his sister, the queen of Spain's, childbirth. Philip wrote to his ambassador Álava in April that he should endeavour to frustrate the project of his being sent. With relations souring between the kingdoms after the Florida affair, it was considered instead by the French crown to send the prince dauphin d'Auvergne, son of the duc de Montpensier.

==== End of the stay at Moulins ====
While in Moulins, on 1 March, the court determined the division of the Nevers-Clèves inheritance between the three Clèves sisters, largely in favour of Henriette de Clèves, wife of the new duc de Nevers. It was also agreed that Henriette, and thus the duc de Nevers could enjoy the peerage of the Nivernais. Charles stressed that his prime concern was to preserve the house of Nevers.

The next day, 2 March, Catherine played host to a grand feast on a house located approximately a league out of the city, at the far perimeter of a large park.

Another matter addressed at Moulins was the treaty of Lausanne between the duke of Savoy and the canton of Bern. The duc de Nemours lobbied on behalf of the duke of Savoy at the French court concerning the treaty. The two parties had signed the agreement in 1564, by which Bern would withdraw from Chablais, Gex, Ternier and Gaillard. But, before the Bernese could evacuate, both French and Spanish approval was required.

During March, both Catherine and Charles fell victim to a fever, experiencing six attacks from it in a single day. Charles was left weakened by the experience, but Catherine took the illness in her stride. It was the desire of both to leave Moulins promptly, due to the foulness of the air, and the fact parts of the court had already left the place.

On 12 March, the constable de Montmorency, the admiral de Coligny and the cardinal de Châtillon departed from Moulins. This was ahead of the main court. The constable de Montmorency had hoped that the cardinal de Lorraine would be at his window for the departure, so that he might receive the parting respects of the admiral de Coligny. But, on the day, the cardinal de Lorraine's windows and doors were shuttered. Damville and the comte de Villars would not accompany the departing grandees beyond the gates of Moulins.

Leaving Moulins, the court made for Auvergne, following the road along the river Allier. Their first stop was at the village of Bessay, with the night spent at Varennes. On 25 March, the court dined at Saint-Germain-des-Fossés while they waited to enter Vichy. The next day the court was to be found in the city. Moving om from Vichy, the Allier was crossed on a long and rickety wooden bridge, thereby entering into Auvergne.

During the court's stay in the Bourbonnais, Philip wrote to Álava concerning French affairs. Philip noted that he had informed the French ambassador Fourquevaux of his frustration concerning the state of Catholicism in France. He explained that as Fourquevaux was not present at Bayonne he could not fully communicate with him.

== Auvergne ==
The village of Saint-Priest-Bramefant and the town of Maringues. were visited in turn. The latter offered the king an entry on 28 March. Crossing the plains, the court arrived at Pont-du-Château, a holding of the Chabannes family. Here the lands Catherine had inherited from her mother Madeleine were frequented. The night of 28 March was spent at Catherine's small château of Dusset. On 29 March, after leaving the river and climbing through the hills the court arrived at Vic-le-Comte (another territory of Catherine's). The Allier was then forded again, this time on a pontoon bridge to make for Saint-Amant which boasted a château and town next to the lake, and Saint-Saturnin (still in Catherine's lands). At Mont-Dore on 31 March they marvelled at the snow caked mountains.

=== Clermont-Ferrand ===
Clermont and its twin town Montferrand (now part of the combined Clermont-Ferrand) were next. Charles enjoyed an entry into Clermont and met there the headmaster of the local college. This figure, named François Pezant requested of Charles permission to run a play he had written again. Charles gave his complements to the man. From Clermont to Montferrand on 2 April. Before the king's residence here, a triumphant procession was held, with girls dancing.

== End of the tour ==
=== Road north ===
The court departed for Riom on 3 April. Lunch was taken at Saint-Bonnet before the day was ended at Aigueperse. The latter place being the birthplace of the chancellor L'Hôpital. Crossing the Sioule gorge by means of a bridge on 4 April, the court took its lunch with the monks of the abbey of Ébreuil, entering back into the Bourbonnais. While the court had been in Auvergne, it pleased the notables of several towns by granting them consulates, freeing their administration from the domination of seigneurs. Similar grants had been made to towns in the Limousin. There it had been Limoges, Saint-Yrieix and soon Tulle that stood as beneficiaries. Back in the Bourbonnais the court stayed first at Chantelle on the night of 4 April, one of the former châteaux of the duc de Bourbon. On 5 April the court passed through La Covée terminating the day at the château de Sazeret. The lunch of 6 April was enjoyed at Saint-Priest with the day ended at Cosne-sur-l'Œuil. It was at the latter place that Easter Sunday was celebrated. Entering the Nivernais on Easter Monday, the court made for Theneville on route to the château de Tracy-sur-Loire]. On 7 April, the court passed through Grossouvre on the way to La Guerche, where the duc de Nevers possessed a château. The duc d'Anjou met with the duc de Nevers here. The duc de Nevers would meet several times with the Spanish ambassador Álava. Charles' marriage prospects and Florida were discussed. On 10 April, after having eaten at the village of Aubigny, the Loire was crossed by bridge at the capital of the Nivernais, La Charité. The court staying there for the next five days, Easter was celebrated solemnly by Charles in this city. On 16 April, the court visited Pougny and Donzy-le-Pré, passing through Entrains on 17 April to spend the night at La Pesselière. On 18 April, Ouanne was passed through with the court arriving at the Burgundian city of Auxerre. Among those who came out under arms to meet with the king were the Protestants. These Protestants were dressed in blackface and wielding cutlasses so that they might play the role of 'Moors'. Charles humiliated them by ordering them to the back of the procession. While residing at the bishops palace in Auxerre, the king again played his joke of throwing the prince de Béarn's cap into the Cathedral of Auxerre. As the court progressed, they were careful to avoid Noyers, where the château of the prince de Condé was located and Châtillon-sur-Loing as it charted this course back to Sens. Also in the area, was Tanlay, a residence of the seigneur d'Andelot.

From Auxerre on 19 April to Régennes, a château of the bishopric of Auxerre. The Yonne was forded by a bridge at Joigny, where Charles made an entry. On 20 April, the court made their lunch at the village of Armeau, before heading on to first Villeneuve and then on to Sens for the night. The day of 21 April was spent at Sens. Leaving Sens, the court lunched at Sergines on 22 April, then arrived at the village of Bray-sur-Seine on 23 April. In Álava's opinion the march was becoming increasingly rapid and disorganised, so fast in fact that he suspected some covert reason involving the admiral de Coligny. Coligny had indeed come to join the court, and the queen of Navarre informed Álava that the court would visit Condé's government of Picardy. Leaving Bray, the court crossed the Seine and entered Brie.

While in Brie, in the small town of Mons-en-Montois (where they were lunching), the memoirist Claude Haton, a parish priest of Provins narrated an episode in which the king, and his brother the duc d'Anjou came upon a Protestant catechism and the translation of some psalms, in the house of a gunner. The two young men then proceeded to argue which of them could better imitate a Protestant pastor. The act finished, they tore up the literature they had discovered, throwing it in one another's faces. All this transpired before Catherine, and the Protestant grandees Coligny and d'Andelot, among others. Charles bid his brother ask the seigneur d'Andelot who had better imitated the Protestant preacher. Carroll reports that the Protestant grandees ground their teeth at this display. Chevallier draws a parallel between this episode, and another similar one the royal children were involved in, at the expense of Catholicism, some years earlier. Leaving Mons, the court spent the night at Nangis.

The tour was now approaching its conclusion, and starting on 21 April made its way rapidly back to Paris. Leaving Nangis, the court lunched at Touquin before arriving at the royal residence of the Montceaux-en-Brie, where they would tarry for five days. Departing Montceaux on the final day of April, the court headed for Bussy-Saint-Georges, and then on to the other royal residence of Saint-Maur. It was here that the duc de Nemours was married to the widowed duchesse de Guise on 6 May. The marriage contract had been drawn up a few days previous on 29 April, in the presence of Charles, Catherine, and the cardinals de Bourbon, de Lorraine, and de Guise. Charles contributed 100,000 livres to the bride's dowry, which included royal lands such as Dourdan, Provins, and Saumur with a value of 156,000 livres. The marriage improved the duc de Nemours' financial circumstances as the two could now pool their resources. Álava, writing the day after, records that the wedding was not without incident. A representative of Françoise de Rohan arrived to protest the engagement. He was ordered to remain silent by Charles and Catherine but refused and this became the cause of disorder. He stated that given Nemours had forced himself upon Françoise and made her pregnant he ought to be decapitated. This was a cause for laughter among Charles, Catherine and the court and he was ushered out.

== Legacy ==
On 10 May, the court arrived back in Paris, visiting the residence of madame du Perron in the suburb of Saint-Honoré.

The tour had failed to patch over religious divisions between French Catholics and Protestants. Nevertheless, in the moment, Cloulas notes that Catherine was heaped with praise for her conciliatory work, as well as the education of her son the king she had provide through the tour. Indeed, he further states that the tour presented the herald of a permanent peace, even if this would prove to be illusory. Chevallier argues that the tour was successful for demonstrating to the kingdom the Catholicity of the royal family, and that a new civil war had not arisen during the progress of the tour. The historian Wanegffelen argues that the violence between Protestant and Catholics that continued in the wake of the tour challenge the effectiveness of the pacification.

Claude Haton saw the tour as a triumph for Catholicism. Catholics were emboldened and Protestants intimidated. The kingdom had seen the king, and those around him within and without his family, had stayed true to the Catholic religion. This served to reinforce the Catholic faith. In Haton's estimation, seeing Charles conduct himself in this fashion caused some Protestants to return to the Catholic fold. The poet, Ronsard, had the previous year extolled Catherine's pacification efforts, arguing the kingdom had seen joy supplant fear, and peace supplant discord.

In a letter of 12 May, Catherine bragged to her ambassador in Spain, Fourquevaux concerning the state of the kingdom in the wake of the tour. She noted that it was to the great frustration of the duke of Alba that the realm was so peaceable. Fourquevaux was to know the truth so that he could challenge the liars who argued France was not pacified or obedient to Charles. She justified the policy of tolerance in France with comparison to Philip's "lenient" attitude towards the 'Moors'. Champion suggests that the goal of this optimistic correspondence was to see Fourquevaux impress the information upon Philip, that France was at peace, with both Protestant and Catholic nobles having come to show their loyalty to her son. Jouanna argues that the oaths of loyalty the crown felt it necessary to extract revealed the weakness of the monarchy.

=== Accounts ===
The nature of the journey undertaken by the court from 1564 to 1566 was recorded by a member of the kitchen staff who undertook it, named Abel Jouan in his work Recueil et discours du voyage du roy Charles IX which was published shortly after the trip's conclusion. This account recorded the various places the court stopped at, when they arrived and departed, the distances involved, as well as where the court took its meals. This account has been used in conjunction with the various letters sent by the participants by modern historians.

== Sources ==
- Babelon, Jean-Pierre (2009). Henri IV. Fayard.
- Boltanski, Ariane (2006). Les ducs de Nevers et l'État royal: genèse d'un compromis (ca 1550 - ca 1600). Librairie Droz.
- Boucher, Jacqueline (2023). "Le Cardinal de Lorraine, Premier Ministre de Fait ou d'Ambition (1559 – 1574)". In Bellenger, Yvonne (ed.). Le Mécénat et l'Influence des Guises. Classiques Garnier.
- Bourquin, Laurent (2001). Les Nobles, La Ville, et Le Roi: L'Autorité Nobilaire en Anjou Pendant les Guerres de Religion. Belin.
- Brunet, Serge (2017). «De l'Espagnol dedans le Ventre!»: Les Catholiques du Sud-Ouest de La France face à La Réforme (vers 1540–1589) Tome 1. Honoré Champion.
- Carroll, Stuart (2005). Noble Power during the French Wars of Religion: The Guise Affinity and Catholic Cause in Normandy. Cambridge University Press.
- Carroll, Stuart (2011). Martyrs and Murderers: The Guise Family and the Making of Europe. Oxford University Press.
- Carroll, Stuart (2013). "'Nager entre deux eaux': The Princes and the Ambiguities of French Protestantism". Sixteenth Century Journal. 44 4.
- Cassan, Michel (1996). Le Temps des Guerres de Religion: Le Case du Limousin (vers 1530 - vers 1630). Publisud.
- Champion, Pierre (1937). Catherine de Médicis présente à Charles IX son Royaume (1564-1566). Grasset.
- Champion, Pierre (1939). Charles IX: La France et le Controle de l'Espagne (Tome 1). Grasset.
- Champion, Pierre (1941). La Jeunesse de Henri III (1551 – 1571). Grasset.
- Chevallier, Pierre (1985). Henri III: Roi Shakespearien. Fayard.
- Christin, Olivier (1997). La Paix de Religion: L'Autonomisation de la Raison Politique au XVIe Siècle. Seuil.
- Cloulas, Ivan (1979). Catherine de Médicis. Fayard.
- Constant, Jean-Marie (1984). Les Guise. Hachette.
- Constant, Jean-Marie (1996). La Ligue. Fayard.
- Crété, Liliane (1985). Coligny. Fayard.
- Daussy, Hugues (2015). Le Parti Huguenot: Chronique d'une Désillusion (1557-1572). Droz.
- Decrue, Francis (1889). Anne, Duc de Montmorency: Connétable et Pair de France sous les Rois Henri II, François II et Charles IX. E. Plon, Nourrit et Cie.
- François, Michel (1959). Lettres de Henri III, Roi de France: Tome I (1557 - Août 1574). Société de l'Histoire de France.
- Garrisson, Janine (1991). Guerre Civile et Compromis 1559-1598. Éditions du Seuil.
- Greengrass, Mark; Rentet, Thierry (2023). "Un serviteur du roi affronte ses critiques Bertrand-Raimbaud de Simiane de Gordes (1565-1566)". In Gellard, Matthieu; Haan, Bertrand; Foa, Jérémie (eds.). Servir le Prince en Temps de Guerre Civile: Dans L'Europe des XVIe et XVIIe Siècles. Presses Universitaires de Rennes.
- Haan, Bertrand (2011). L'Amitié Entre Princes: Une Alliance Franco-Espagnole au Temps des Guerres de Religion (1560-1570). Presses Universitaires de France.
- Harding, Robert (1978). Anatomy of a Power Elite: the Provincial Governors in Early Modern France. Yale University Press.
- Holt, Mack (2002). The Duke of Anjou and the Politique Struggle During the Wars of Religion. Cambridge University Press.
- Holt, Mack (2005). The French Wars of Religion, 1562-1629. Cambridge University Press.
- Holt, Mack (2020). The Politics of Wine in Early Modern France: Religion and Popular Culture in Burgundy 1477-1630. Cambridge University Press.
- Joblin, Alain (2023). Henri III: Un Roi de Tragédie. Ellipses.
- Jouanna, Arlette (1989). Le Devoir de révolte: La noblesse française et la gestation de l'Etat moderne 1559-1661. Fayard.
- Jouanna, Arlette (1998). "Le Temps des Guerres de Religion en France (1559-1598)". In Jouanna, Arlette; Boucher, Jacqueline; Biloghi, Dominique; Le Thiec, Guy (eds.). Histoire et Dictionnaire des Guerres de Religion.
- Jouanna, Arlette (2021). La France du XVIe Siècle 1483-1598. Presses Universitaires de France.
- Kaiser, Wolfgang (1992). Marseille au Temps des Troubles: Morphologie Sociale et Luttes de Factions 1559 – 1596. Translated by Chaix, Florence. Éditions de l'École des Hautes Études en Sciences Sociales.
- Knecht, Robert (1996). The Rise and Fall of Renaissance France. Fontana Press.
- Knecht, Robert (2000). The French Civil Wars. Longman.
- Knecht, Robert (2008). The French Renaissance Court. Yale University Press.
- Knecht, Robert (2014). Catherine de' Medici. Routledge.
- Knecht, Robert (2016). Hero or Tyrant? Henry III, King of France, 1574-1589. Routledge.
- Konnert, Mark (1997). Civic Agendas & Religious Passion: Châlons-sur-Marne during the French Wars of Religion 1560-1594. Sixteenth Century Journal Publishers Inc.
- Konnert, Mark (2006). Local Politics in the French Wars of Religion: The Towns of Champagne, the Duc de Guise and the Catholic League 1560-1595. Ashgate.
- Labourdette, Jean François (2013). Charles IX et la Puissance Espagnole: Diplomatie et Guerres Civiles (1563–1574). Honoré Champion.
- Labourdette, Jean François (2018). Charles IX, un Roi dans la Tourmente des Guerres Civiles (1560 – 1574). Honoré Champion.
- Le Roux, Nicolas (2022). 1559-1629 Les Guerres de Religion. Gallimard.
- Lhoumeau, Charles Sauzé de (1940). Un Fils Naturel de François Ier: Louis de Saint-Gelais, baron de la Mothe-Saint-Héray. Société Française d'Imprimerie et de Librairie.
- Marchand, Romain (2020). Henri de La Tour (1555 – 1623): Affirmation Politique, Service du Roi et Révolte. Classiques Garnier.
- Mariéjol, Jean H. (1983). La Réforme, la Ligue, l'Édit de Nantes. Tallandier.
- Miquel, Pierre (1980). Les Guerres de Religion. Fayard.
- Neuschel, Kristen (1989). Word of Honor: Interpreting Noble Culture in Sixteenth-Century France. Cornell University Press.
- Nicoll, David (2020). Noble Identity during the French Wars of Religion: Antoine de Crussol, the duc d'Uzès. University of Warwick.
- Pailhès, Claudine (2022). Les Comtes de Foix: Des Pyrénées au Trône de France XIe-XVIe Siècle. Éditions Loubatières.
- Pernot, Michel (1987). Les Guerres de Religion en France 1559-1598. Sedes.
- Pernot, Michel (2013). Henri III: Le Roi Décrié. Éditions de Fallois.
- Pitts, Vincent (2012). Henri IV of France: His Reign and Age. Johns Hopkins University Press.
- Potter, David (1997). The French Wars of Religion: Selected Documents. Palgrave Macmillan.
- Potter, David (2021). The French Wars of Religion in France, 1559-1598: A History in Documents. unpublished.
- Ribera, Jean-Michel (2018). Diplomatie et Espionnage: Les Ambassadeurs du Roi de France auprès de Philippe II - Du Traité du Cateau-Cambrésis (1559) à la mort de Henri III (1589). Classiques Garnier.
- Robbins, Kevin (1997). City on the Ocean Sea: La Rochelle, 1530-1650 Urban Society, Religion and Politics on the French Atlantic Frontier. Brill.
- Roberts, Penny (1996). A City in Conflict: Troyes during the French Wars of Religion. Manchester University Press.
- Roberts, Penny (2013). Peace and Authority during the French Religious Wars c.1560-1600. Palgrave Macmillan.
- Roelker, Nancy Lyman (1968). Queen of Navarre: Jeanne d'Albret 1528-1572. Harvard University Press.
- Roelker, Nancy Lyman (1996). One King, One Faith: The Parlement of Paris and the Religious Reformation of the Sixteenth Century. University of California Press.
- Salmon, J.H.M. (1979). Society in Crisis: France in the Sixteenth Century. Metheun & Co.
- Souriac, Pierre-Jean (2008). Une Guerre Civile: Affrontements Religieux et Militaires dans Le Midi Toulousain (1562-1596). Champ Vallon.
- Solnon, Jean-François (2001). Henri III: un désir de majesté. Librarie Académique Perrin.
- Sournia, Jean-Charles (1981). Blaise de Monluc: Soldat et Écrivain (1500-1577). Fayard.
- Sutherland, Nicola (1962). The French Secretaries of State in the Age of Catherine de Medici. The Athlone Press.
- Sutherland, Nicola (1973). The Massacre of St Bartholomew and the European Conflict 1559-1572. Macmillan.
- Tallon, Alain (2023). "Le Cardinal de Lorraine au Concile de Trente". In Bellenger, Yvonne (ed.). Le Mécénat et l'Influence des Guises. Classiques Garnier.
- Thompson, James (1909). The Wars of Religion in France 1559-1576: The Huguenots, Catherine de Medici and Philip II. Chicago University Press.
- Tievant, Claude (1993). Le Gouverneur de Languedoc Pendant Les Premières Gueurres de Religion (1559 – 1574): Henri de Montmorency-Damville. Publisud.
- Tingle, Elizabeth C. (2006). Authority and Society in Nantes during the French Wars of Religion, 1559-1598. Manchester University Press.
- Tulchin, Allan (2010). That Men Would Praise the Lord: The Triumph of Protestantism in Nîmes 1530-1570. Oxford University Press.
- Venard, Marc (1993). Réforme Protestante, Réforme Catholique dans la Province d'Avignon - XVIe Siècle -. Cerf.
- Venard, Marc (1999). "Catholicism and Resistance to the Reformation in France, 1555-1585". In Benedict, Philip; Marnef, Guido; Nierop, Henk van; Venard, Marc (eds.). Reformation, Revolt and Civil War in France and the Netherlands 1555-1585. Royal Netherlands Academy of Arts and Sciences.
- Venard, Marc (2023). "Le Cardinal de Lorraine dans l'Église de France (1564 – 1574)". In Bellenger, Yvonne (ed.). Le Mécénat et l'Influence des Guises. Classiques Garnier.
- Vester, Matthew (2012). Renaissance Dynasticism and Apanage Politics: Jacques de Savoie-Nemours 1531-1585. Truman State University Press.
- Viallon, Marina (2023). "Politique Chevaleresque: Joutes et Tournois à la Cour Pendant les Guerres de Religion". Les Guerres de Religion 1559-1610: La Haine des Clans. In Fine Éditions d'art.
- Vray, Nicole (1997). La Guerre des Religions dans la France de l'Ouest: Poitou-Aunis-Saintonge 1534-1610. Geste Éditions.
- Wanegffelen, Thierry (2005). Catherine de Médicis: Le Pouvoir au Fémenin. Payot & Rivages.
