= François Annibal II d'Estrées =

French nobleman and diplomat

François Annibal II d'Estrées (1623 - Rome, 30 January 1687) was a French nobleman and diplomat from the House of Estrées.

== Biography ==
Francis Annibal II d'Estrées was the eldest son of François Annibal d'Estrées (1573–1670), Marshal of France, Duke of Estrées (1643), Pair de France (1648), and Marie de Béthune (1602–1628).
He was a nephew of Gabrielle d'Estrées (1571–1599), the mistress of King Henry IV. His brothers were the Marshal and Admiral Jean II d'Estrées (1624–1707) and the Cardinal César d'Estrées (1628– 1714), Bishop of Laon.

He was Count of Nanteuil-le-Haudouin, Marquis de Coeuvres, and from 1670 2nd Duke of Estrées and Pair of France, Viscount of Soissons and Pierrefonds, and also Baron and Seneschall of Boulonnais, Lieutenant-general of the Armies of King, Governor of Île-de-France, Soissons, Noyon and Laon.

From 1671 until his death, he was French Ambassador to the Holy See under the pontificates of Clement X (1670–1676) and Innocent XI (1676–1689) and with residence in the Palazzo Farnese. Due to his office, he took a direct part in the conflicts between the Holy See and Louis XIV. He received support from his younger brother César d'Estrées, who was appointed cardinal on 16 May 1672 and who also resided in Rome.

François Annibal II d'Estrées died of a stroke while serving as ambassador in Rome on 30 January 1687. His body was brought to Soissons and buried there in the church of the Convent of the Feuillants, which his father had built as a family burial place.

=== Marriage and children ===
He married in 1647 Catherine de Lauzières-Thémine and had 3 children :

- François-Annibal III d'Estrées (1648-1698), 3rd Duke of Estrées,
- Louis Charles d'Estrées (died 1672), Marquis de Thémines, sea captain
- Jean d’Estrées (1651-1694), Bishop of Laon

== Sources ==
- Eugène MICHAUD, Louis XIV et Innocent XI d'après les correspondances diplomatiques inédites du Ministère des affaires étrangères de France : Débats théologiques et affaires religieuses, Paris, G. Charpentier, 4 vol. 1882–1886.
- Gabriel HANOTAUX, Recueil des instructions données aux ambassadeurs et ministres de France, Rome, t. 1, (1648-1687), Paris, F. Alcan, 1888.
- Charles GÉRIN, Louis XIV et le Saint-Siège, Paris, V. Lecoffre, 1894, 2 vol.
- Anselme de Sainte Marie (Père Anselme), Histoire généalogique et chronologique de la Maison Royale de France, 9 volumes, Paris, 1725 et années suivantes.
- Racines & Histoire, par Étienne Pattou, 2006 et 2021, Famille d'Estrées, p. 5 et 6
