= Jean Babou =

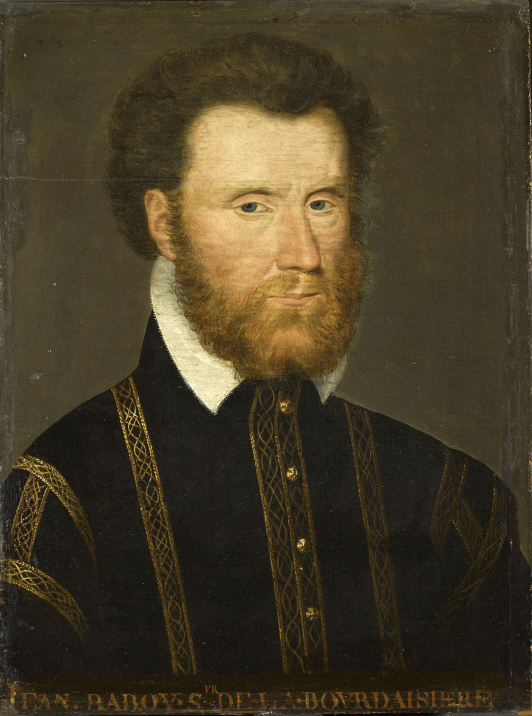
Anonymous portrait of Babou (Louvre)

Jean II Babou (1511 - 3 October 1569) was a French soldier, notable as grand-bailiff (grand-bailli) of Touraine and France's Grand Master of Artillery (1567). He was Lord of La Bourdaisière, count of Sagonne, Lord of Thuisseau, Chissé, Vouillon, Pruniers, Germigny and Brain sur l'Authion.

== Life ==
Babou was the son of Philibert Babou (c.1484 - September 1557) and his wife Marie Gaudin (c.1495-1580). Philibert was lord of La Bourdaisière, who in 1521 became mayor of Tours, where Jean was born, whilst from 1532 to 1542 Marie was a lady-in-waiting to Queen Eleanor of Austria. In 1528 Jean became cup bearer to Francis I of France and the Queen of Navarre, the Duchess of Berry. The following year saw him made governor and bailiff of Gien, then maitre de la garde robe to the Dauphin (the future Henry II of France). When the post of grand bailiff of Touraine was created, he became its first holder until his death. He was also Maitre d’hôtel to Francis I and gentleman-in-ordinary-of-the-chamber to Henry II.

He also added to his family lands, acquiring in 1542 the barony of Sagonne from Antoinette d'Amboise, lady of la Rochefoucauld-Barbezieux by her second marriage, and in 1551 the lordship of Jouy from Marc de Beaufort-Canillac-Montboissier, count of Alluye. In 1564 he also bought the estate of Brain-sur-l'Authion in Anjou from Victor Bourgouin, treasurer.

On 26 November 1559 he was made Francis II's ambassador-extraordinary to pope Pius IV, retiring from court on the king's death. Catherine de Medici recalled him to teach and guard François, Duke of Alençon, also making him a lieutenant and putting him in command of the Duke's guards. In 1562 he was made "captain of cities" and governor of the château d'Amboise, then in 1566 a knight of the Order of Saint Michael.

His next post came in 1567 as governor of Brest, then on 15 May the following year he was made Master General of the Artillery and joined the Council of State. He fought bravely against the Protestants at the Battle of Moncontour on 3 October 1569, with his adroit artillery manoeuvre playing a large part in the Catholic victory. He died in November the same year, noted by Brantome as "by reputation a brave and wise gentleman and a strong man of honour".

== Marriage and issue ==
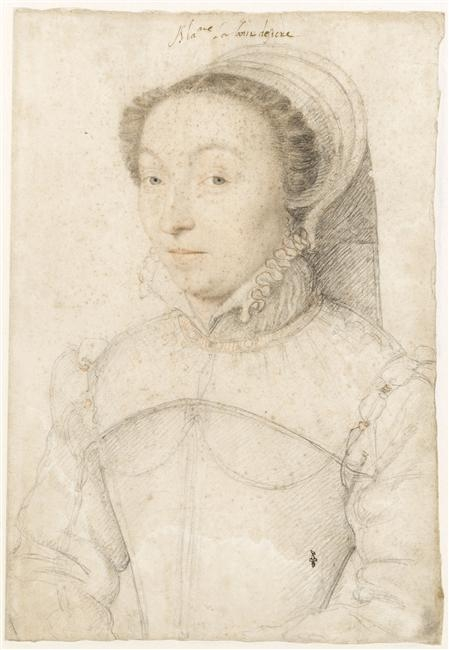
Françoise Robertet (1519-1580), wife of Jean Babou (by François Clouet)

On 5 January 1540 at Blois he married Françoise Robertet, lady of Alluye(s) au Perche-Gouët (1519-?). His new wife had been lady in waiting to Catherine de Medici (1547-1575), Mary Stuart (1560) and Louise of Lorraine (1575-1590) and brought with her a dowry of 400 tournois livres. They had five children:

- Georges Babou (died 1607)
- Jean Babou de La Bourdaisière (1541-1589); on 6 January 1580 married Diane de La Marck (1544-1612), daughter of Robert IV de La Marck
- Françoise Babou de La Bourdaisière (c.1542-1593); on 16 March 1559 at Chartres married Antoine d'Estrées (c. 1529-1609), by whom he was father to Gabrielle d'Estrées
- Isabeau Babou de La Bourdaisière (c. 1551-1625); married François d'Escoubleau de Sourdis, by whom she bore François d'Escoubleau de Sourdis; she may also have been the mistress of Philippe Hurault de Cheverny (1528-1599)
- Marie Babou (died 1582); in 1559 married Claude de Beauvilliers, count of count of St-Aignan.
- Antoinette Babou de La Bourdaisière; in c. 1580 married Jean du Plantadis, master of requests and head of the privy council to queen Louise of Lorraine.
