= Babou =

Babou is a given name or surname. It may refer to:

- Babou de la Bourdaisière family
  - Philibert Babou (c. 1484–1557), cryptographer, trésorier, minister of finance for Francis I, mayor of Tours in 1520
  - Philibert Babou de la Bourdaisière (1513–1570), Roman Catholic bishop and cardinal
- Thomas Babou (1656–1740), Belgian organist and composer
- Edgar Babou (born 1970), Ivorian rugby union player
- Fanny Babou (born 1989), French swimmer
- Babou (singer) (born 1994), full name Babou Nicolai Nelson Lowe, Danish-Gambian singer
- Babou (ocelot), the pet ocelot of Salvador Dalí

== See also ==
- Baboo (disambiguation)
