= Sébastien Zamet =

Sébastien Zamet may refer to:

- Sébastien Zamet (born 1549), French banker
- Sébastien Zamet (born 1588), French bishop
