= Jean d'Estrées =

French priest and politician

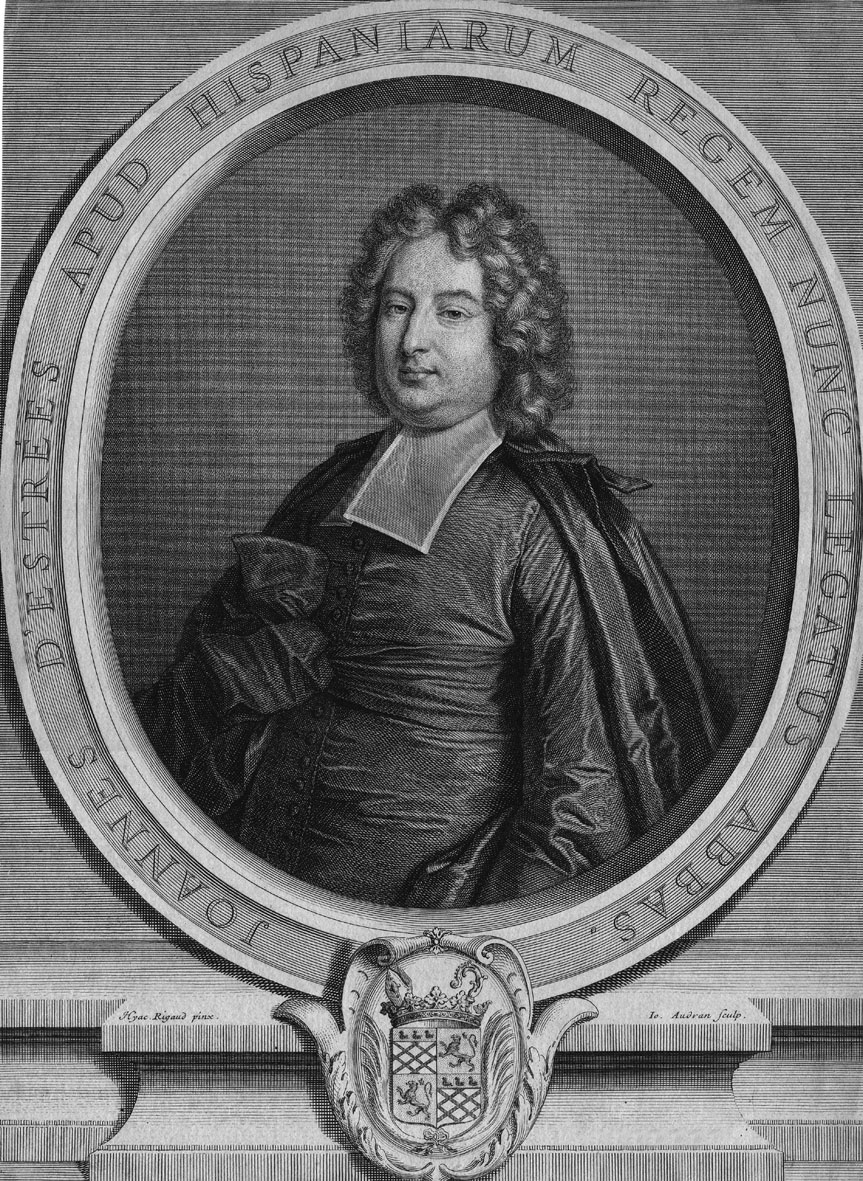
Jean d'Estrées

Jean d'Estrées (French pronunciation: [ʒɑ̃ dɛstʁe]; 1666 – 3 March 1718) was a French priest and politician. He was the son of Jean II d'Estrées and his wife Marie Marguerite Morin.

He was born in Paris, the nephew of Cardinal César d'Estrées and brother of Marshal Victor Marie d'Estrées, both academics. In 1691, Jean d'Estrées was abbot of Villeneuve, and in that capacity attended the States of Nantes. In 1692, he was given his first diplomatic mission, being responsible for the assurance of Portuguese neutrality during the War of the Grand Alliance. Earning a doctorate in theology in 1698, he became the abbot of Évron. In 1703, he joined his uncle in Spain, who was the ambassador to France, and succeeded him after two years. In 1711 he was elected to l'Académie française, which had searched for a suitable candidate to replace his well-known predecessor, Nicolas Boileau-Despréaux.

Jean d'Estrées was also named to the Conseil d'État (Council of State) and the Archbishopric of Cambrai in 1716, but died before his coronation.
