= Duke of Estrées =

Duke of Estrées (Fr.: duc d'Estrées) was a title of nobility in the peerage of France that was created for François Annibal d'Estrées in 1663 by King Louis XIV. This title became extinct in 1771. In 1892, Alfonso XIII of Spain revived the title by granting it to Charles de La Rochefoucauld-Doudeauville, whose great-grandmother was Bénigne Le Tellier de Louvois, sister to the last duke.

== List of dukes of Estrées ==
=== 1663—1771 ===
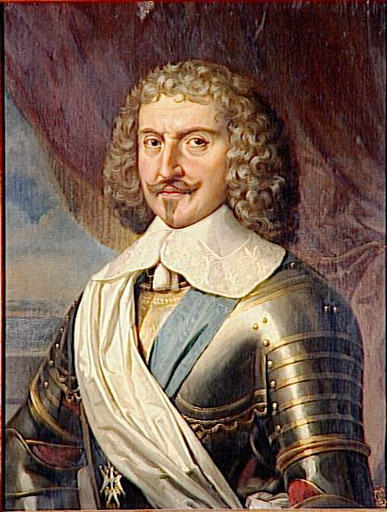
François Annibal d'Estrées (1573–1670), the first Duke of Estrées.

From	To	Duke of Estrées	Relationship to predecessor
1663	1670	François Annibal d'Estrées (1573–1670)	First Duke of Estrées
1670	1687	François Annibal II d'Estrées (1623–1687)	Son of François Annibal d'Estrées
1687	1698	François Annibal III d'Estrées (1648–1698)	Son of François Annibal II d'Estrées
1698	1723	Louis Armand d'Estrées (1682–1723)	Son of François Annibal III d'Estrées
1723	1737	Victor-Marie d'Estrées (1660–1737)	Nephew of Louis Armand d'Estrées
1763	1771	Louis Charles César Le Tellier (1695–1771)	Nephew of Victor-Marie d'Estrées

=== 1892—present ===
From	To	Duke of Estrées	Relationship to predecessor
1892	1907	Charles de La Rochefoucauld-Doudeauville (1864–1907)	Re-creation; great-grandnephew to the previous duke
1907	1963	Armand I de La Rochefoucauld-Doudeauville (1870–1963)	Brother of Charles de La Rochefoucauld-Doudeauville
1963	1970	Sosthènes III de La Rochefoucauld-Doudeauville (1897–1970)	Son of Armand I de La Rochefoucauld-Doudeauville
1970	1995	Armand II de La Rochefoucauld-Doudeauville (1902–1995)	Brother of Sosthènes de La Rochefoucauld-Doudeauville
1995		Armand III de La Rochefoucauld-Doudeauville (b. 1944)	Son of Armand II de La Rochefoucauld-Doudeauville

Claimants also include:

Pierre-Claude d'Estrée, Comte-Duc d'Estrées (1933 - 1985); Claude Philippe d'Estrée, Comte-Duc d'Estrées (b. 1952)
