= Sébastien Zamet (born 1549) =

French banker

Sébastien Zamet (1549 in Lucca - July 1614 in Paris) was an Italian-born French financier who held the title baron de Murat and de Billy.

== Life ==
Born in Lucca, Tuscany, Sebastiano Zametti was the son of a shoemaker, perhaps a shoemaker himself. He came to France at a time when Catherine de' Medici surrounded herself with Italians who were seeking success or a career.

Zamet entered the service of the court of France as a valet to King Henry III and was noticed by the court for his playful and facetious character. Clever and available, he responded to all kinds of requests from the prince and the great ones. His talent and sometimes his intrigues enabled him to do business, especially in the field of salt speculation, and he became considerably wealthy. He became a naturalized French citizen in 1581.

He maintained good relations with the Catholic League and its lords, particularly with Charles, Duke of Mayenne. For the latter, in 1592, he took charge of negotiations to obtain his reconciliation with King Henry IV. Even if the transaction was not completely successful, Zamet obtained a truce in 1593, which earned him the goodwill of Henry IV. The relationship between the two men became increasingly close, not to say familiar.

King Henry IV would regularly visit the financier's mansion in Paris, the Hôtel Zamet, in the rue de la Cerisaic, where many people were received, particularly gentlemen looking for amorous and discreet appointments. Henri IV went there when he entered Paris and returned every time he wanted to amuse himself with new female conquests. Zamet, as always, fulfilled the king's every wish, even settling his love or gambling debts. Of course, the skillful financier received privileges and offices in return. He held the title of baron as engagist lord de Murat and de Billy. (Note: An engagist lord is a person who, as security for a loan or other benefit granted to the titular lord, receives the lordship as a pledge, receives during the whole period of the engagement all the revenues and exercises all the rights and powers belonging to the lord.)

In 1599, Gabrielle d'Estrées, mistress and favourite of the king, came to refresh herself at Zamet's hotel and died of apoplexy. Rumor has it that she was poisoned there. Although this hypothesis seems unlikely, it gained momentum from various factors, including the statements of the beautiful Gabrielle, who had complained of being poisoned just before her death, and the fact that Marie de Médicis stayed in the hotel when she arrived in Paris in February 1600 to marry Henri IV.

Zamet remained in the confidence of Queen Marie even after the assassination of Henry IV in 1610. She used to dine with him. He continued to render her the services he had offered all his life to monarchs and powerful people. He was adviser to the king, governor of the Château de Fontainebleau, and finally superintendent of the house of the queen's mother.

== Family ==
He married Madeleine Leclerc du Tremblay who gave him two children:

- Jean Zamet, baron of Murat and Billy, mestre de camp of the regiment of Picardie then marshal of camp and died at the siege of Montpellier on 8 September 1622.
- Sébastien Zamet, bishop of Langres.

He died in Paris on 14 July 1614.

== Bibliography ==
- Olivier Giron, « De la cordonnerie de Lucques à la baronnie de Billy ou le destin de Sébastien Zamet », Bulletin de la Société d'émulation du Bourbonnais, 64, 4th trimester of 1988, p. 260-270.
- Michaud, Biographie universelle, ancienne et moderne, Paris, 1828.
- Jean-Baptiste Ladvocat, Dictionnaire historique et bibliographique, Paris, 1822.
