= Philibert Babou de la Bourdaisière =

His Eminence Philibert Babou de la Bourdaisière
- Cardinal-Priest of Sant'Anastasia
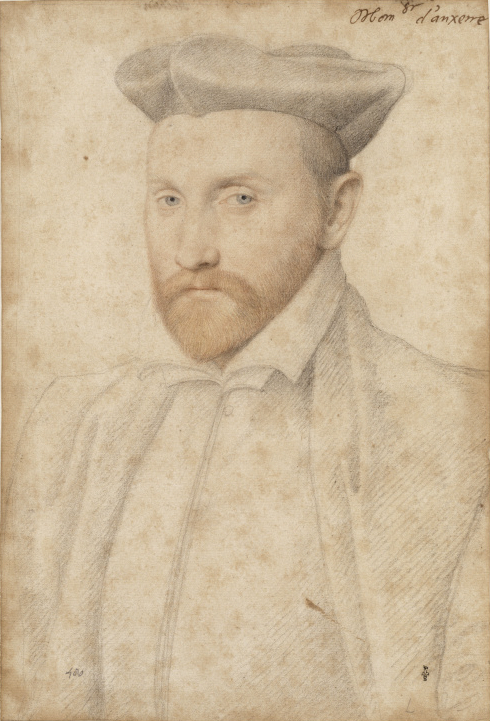
- Potrait by François Clouet
- Church: Catholic Church
- Appointed: 14 May 1568
- Term ended: 25 January 1570
- Predecessor: Ludovico Simonetta
- Successor: Antoine Perrenot de Granvelle
- Other posts: Administrator of Auxerre (1562-1570)
- Previous posts: Bishop of Angoulême (1533–1567); Cardinal-Priest of San Sisto Vecchio (1561–1564)

Orders
- Created cardinal: 26 February 1561 by Pope Pius IV
- Rank: Cardinal-Priest

Personal details
- Born: 1513 Brisighella, Italy
- Died: 25 January 1570 (aged 56–57) Rome, Papal States
- Coat of arms

Philibert Babou de la Bourdaisière (French pronunciation: [filibɛʁ babu də la buʁdɛzjɛʁ]; 1513 – 25 January 1570) was a Roman Catholic bishop and cardinal.

== Biography ==
Philibert Babou de la Bourdaisière was born in Brisighella in 1513, the son of Philibert Babou and Marie Gaudin. He was from a French family. His mother was the mistress of Francis I of France. His brother, Jacques Babou de la Bourdaisière, was Bishop of Angoulême.

He studied Ancient Greek and Latin, obtaining a degree from the University of Paris.

Following his brother's death, he was elected Bishop of Angoulême on 13 January 1533; he served as administrator until reaching the canonical age to be consecrated. He was counselor and master of memorials at the court of Henry II of France. He became dean of the Basilica of St. Martin, Tours. In February 1556, Henry II of France sent him to Rome as his ambassador; he remained the French ambassador under Francis II of France and Charles IX of France.

Pope Pius IV made him a cardinal priest in the consistory of 26 February 1561. He received the red hat and the titular church of San Sisto Vecchio on 10 March 1561.

On 16 December 1562 he was named administrator of the Diocese of Auxerre. He was a participant in the Council of Trent in 1562 and 1563. He opted for the titular church of San Martino ai Monti on 17 November 1564. He did not participate in the papal conclave of 1565-66 that elected Pope Pius V. He resigned the government of the diocese of Angoulême before 4 June 1567. On 14 May 1568 he opted for the titular church of Sant'Anastasia al Palatino. He was Camerlengo of the Sacred College of Cardinals from 11 January 1570 until his death, two weeks later.

He died in the palace of Sant'Apollinare in Rome on 25 January 1570. He was buried in San Luigi dei Francesi.

== See also ==
- Catholic Church in France
