= François Annibal d'Estrées =

French diplomat and soldier (1573–1670)

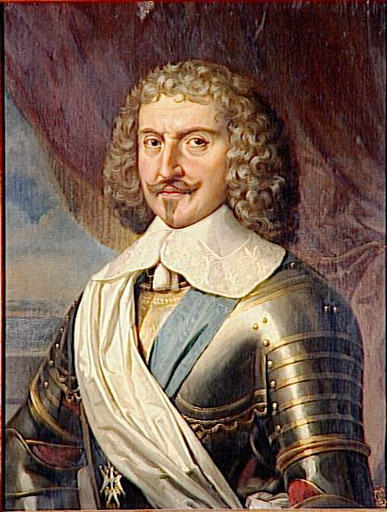
A fictional portrait by Paulin Guérin, 1838

François-Annibal d'Estrées, duc d'Estrées (1573 – 5 May 1670) was a French diplomat, soldier and Marshal of France.

== Biography ==
François-Annibal d'Estrées was born in 1573, to Antoine d'Estrées and Françoise Babou de La Bourdaisière, and the brother of Gabrielle d'Estrées, mistress of Henry IV of France and Julienne-Hippolite-Joséphine, Duchess of Villars.
His first title was that of a marquis de Cœuvres. He was destined for the church, and was Bishop of Noyon in 1594–96, but preferred a military career and joined the army where he became Lieutenant General.

In 1605, he reputedly gave the Carthusian monastic order a recipe he had devised for what would become known as Chartreuse liqueur. The original recipe is still sold by the Carthusian monks as Élixir Végétal de la Grand-Chartreuse.

In 1621, he was sent to Rome as French ambassador to the Holy See, and lobbied for the election of Pope Gregory XV. In 1624, under Marie de' Medici, he was given supreme command over the troops of France, Venice and Savoy in the conquest of Valtellina. For this, he was given in 1626 the title of a Marshal of France. In 1630, he tried in vain to conquer Mantua. In 1632, he was put in command of the Army of the Rhine and took Trier.

After his military career, he became a diplomat.

Between 1636 and 1648, he was again French envoy in Rome. After this Louis XIV promoted him to the Dukedom of Estrées. François-Annibal was appointed Governor of Île de France and later Soissons.

His son Jean II d'Estrées and his grandson Victor-Marie d'Estrées also reached the rank of Marshal of France.

=== Marriage and children ===
With his first wife, Marie de Béthune (1602–1628), he had three children:

- François Annibal II d'Estrées (1623–1687), his successor
- Jean II d'Estrées (1627–1707), Marshal of France
- César d'Estrées (1628–1714), Bishop of Laon.

With his second wife, Anne Habert (ca 1600–1661), sister of Henri Louis Habert de Montmor, he had two children :

- Louis d'Estrées (1637–1656), killed in the Battle of Valenciennes (1656)
- Christine d'Estrées (died 1658), married François Marie, Prince of Lillebonne, no issue.

His third wife was Gabrielle de Longueval, without issue.
