= Abbey of Saint-Père-en-Vallée =

Coordinates: 48.4435°N 1.4927°E

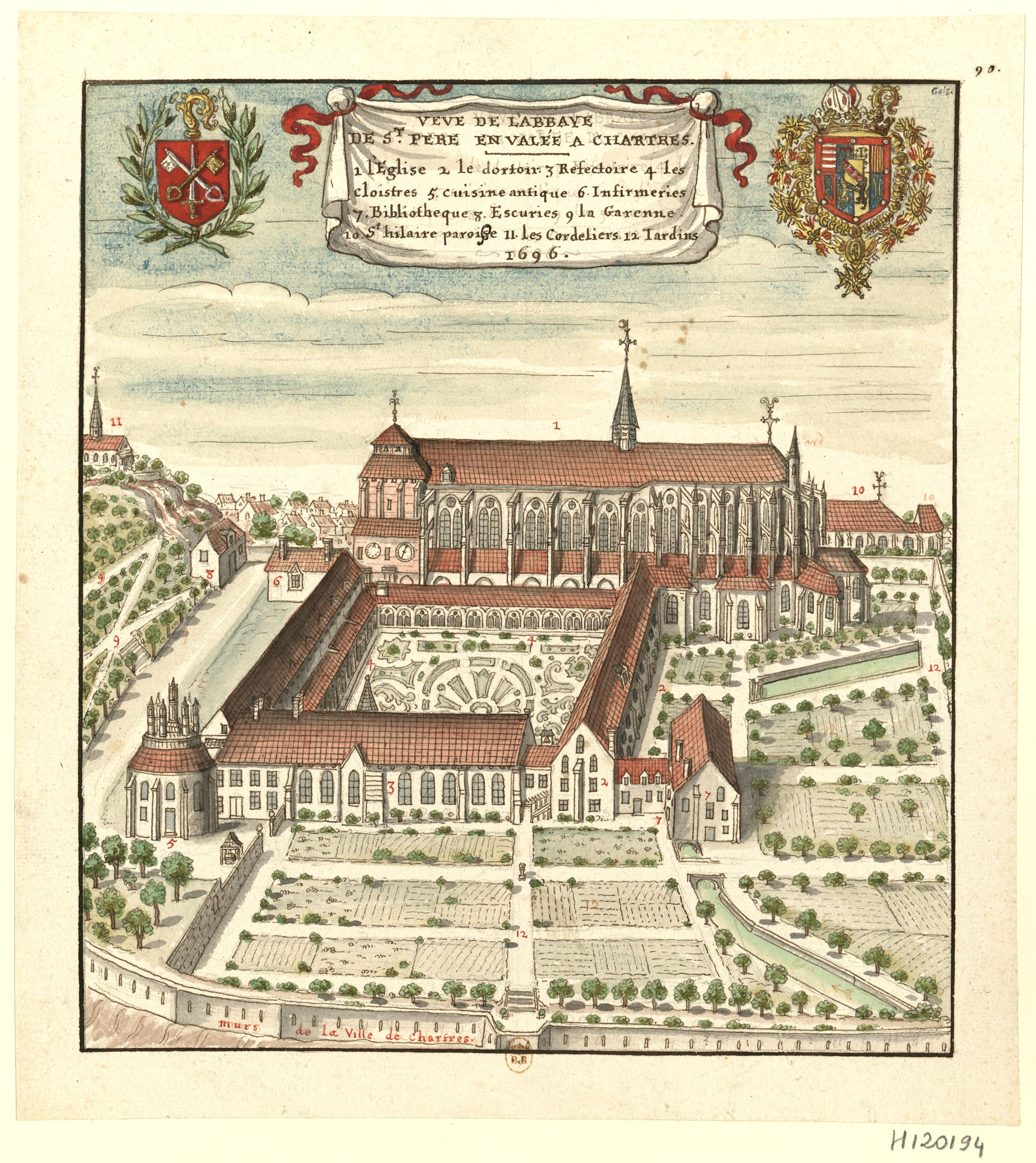
Bird's-eye view of the abbey from 1696

The Abbey of Saint-Père-en-Vallée was a monastery just outside Chartres in France. Founded by Queen Balthild in the seventh century, it adopted the Benedictine rule in 954 and joined the Congregation of Saint-Maur in 1650. It was closed with all other monasteries during the French Revolution in 1790. Today, its buildings lie within the city of Chartres and are classified as a historical monument. The church, Église Saint-Pierre de Chartres, continues to serve as a parish church.

Saint-Père-en-Vallée is so named because it occupied the low ground outside the walls of Chartres, while the cathedral lay within the walls.

== History ==
The earliest document pertaining to Saint-Père-en-Vallée is the record of grants made to several clergy in 646 by Queen Balthild and a certain nobleman named Hilary.

In the 840s, the monks of Saint-Père-en-Vallée got into a conflict with the bishop of Chartres, Elias, and went into exile at the abbey of Saint-Germain d'Auxerre. In 858 the monastery was sacked by Vikings. Afterwards, it was plundered by the bishop.

In 911 it was attacked a second time by Vikings under the command of Rollo. In 930, a friendlier bishop, Hagano, restored the monastery and gave it fortifications, including a square tower which still stands today as the bell tower. Hagano's successor, Ragenfred, was generous to Saint-Père-en-Vallée with donations and privileges. It was he who definitively established the Benedictine rule in the house. This rule continued to be followed down to 1790.

In the second quarter of the eleventh century, Abbot Landry began to enclose the Bourg Saint-Père, a distinct suburb of Chartres growing up around the monastery. In the twelfth century, the town of Chartres finally swallowed up Saint-Père-en-Vallée and its bourg. The abbey church, which is well preserved today, was built in the Gothic style in the twelfth and thirteenth centuries.

By the seventeenth century, the abbey of Saint-Père-en-Vallée had the oversight of 24 priories and 80 curacies in the diocese of Chartres, Orléans, Évreux, Rouen, Sées and Coutances. In 1650, the abbey joined the Maurists.

At the beginning of the eighteenth century, the conventual buildings were rebuilt, but by 1789 there only eight monks living in them and the abbey's revenues had dwindled to 23,000 livres. In 1790 the French government abolished all religious orders and Saint-Père-en-Vallée was suppressed. In 1803, the abbey church was restored as a parish church named Saint-Pierre.

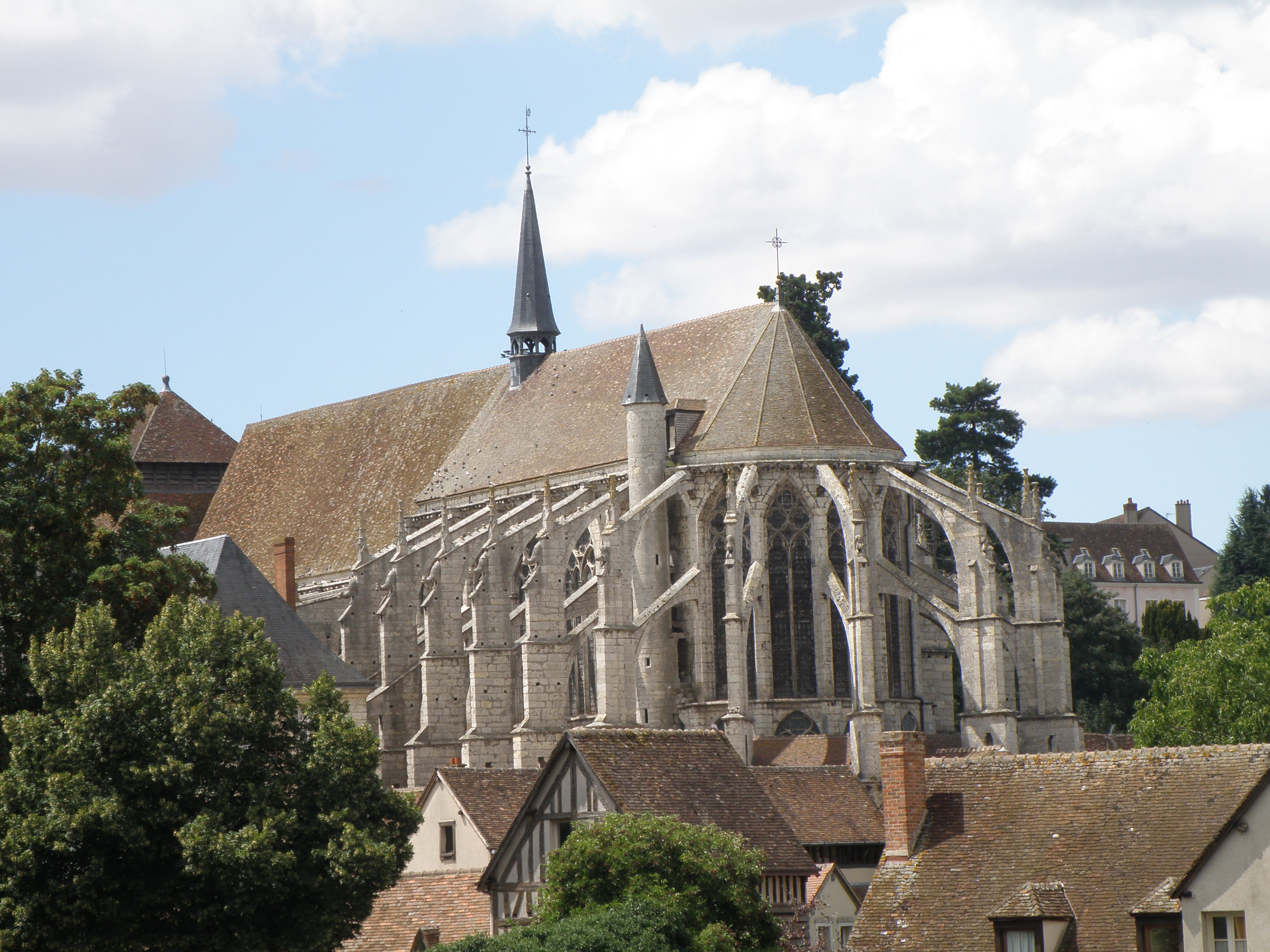
The church, Saint-Pierre, as it appears today

== Manuscripts ==
The cartulary of the abbey is preserved. It was composed in three stages. The oldest section, called the Vetus Hagano ("Old Hagano"), was compiled by a monk named Paul, who was the treasurer of the abbey in the late eleventh century. The second section, the Codex argenteus ("Silver Book"), was compiled around the year 1200. The final section was compiled in 1772 by Dom Muley of the Benedictine abbey of Saint-Crépin de Soissons, while he was organizing the archives of Saint-Père. The whole cartulary was given a modern critical edition in 1840 and published in two volumes by Benjamin Edme Charles Guérard. In 2014, the Archaeological Society of Eure-et-Loir published 400 excerpts from the cartulary in French translation and richly illustrated.

Many manuscripts originally from Saint-Père were lost in 1944 during World War II, when the municipal library of Chartres was struck by a bomb and burned. Before the fire, the library contained 1,687 manuscripts, including 500 from before 1500. Of these, 138 were from the library of Saint-Père. Lost was MS. 65, which contained a catalogue of the books in the library of Saint-Père in the eleventh century. At that time, it had 94 books, an exceptionally high number for the period. Among the other lost works was MS. 24, the Liber comitis of Audradus Modicus, which he wrote and illustrated in the basilica of Saint Martin at Tours towards 820. It had been kept in Saint-Père for centuries.

== Abbots ==
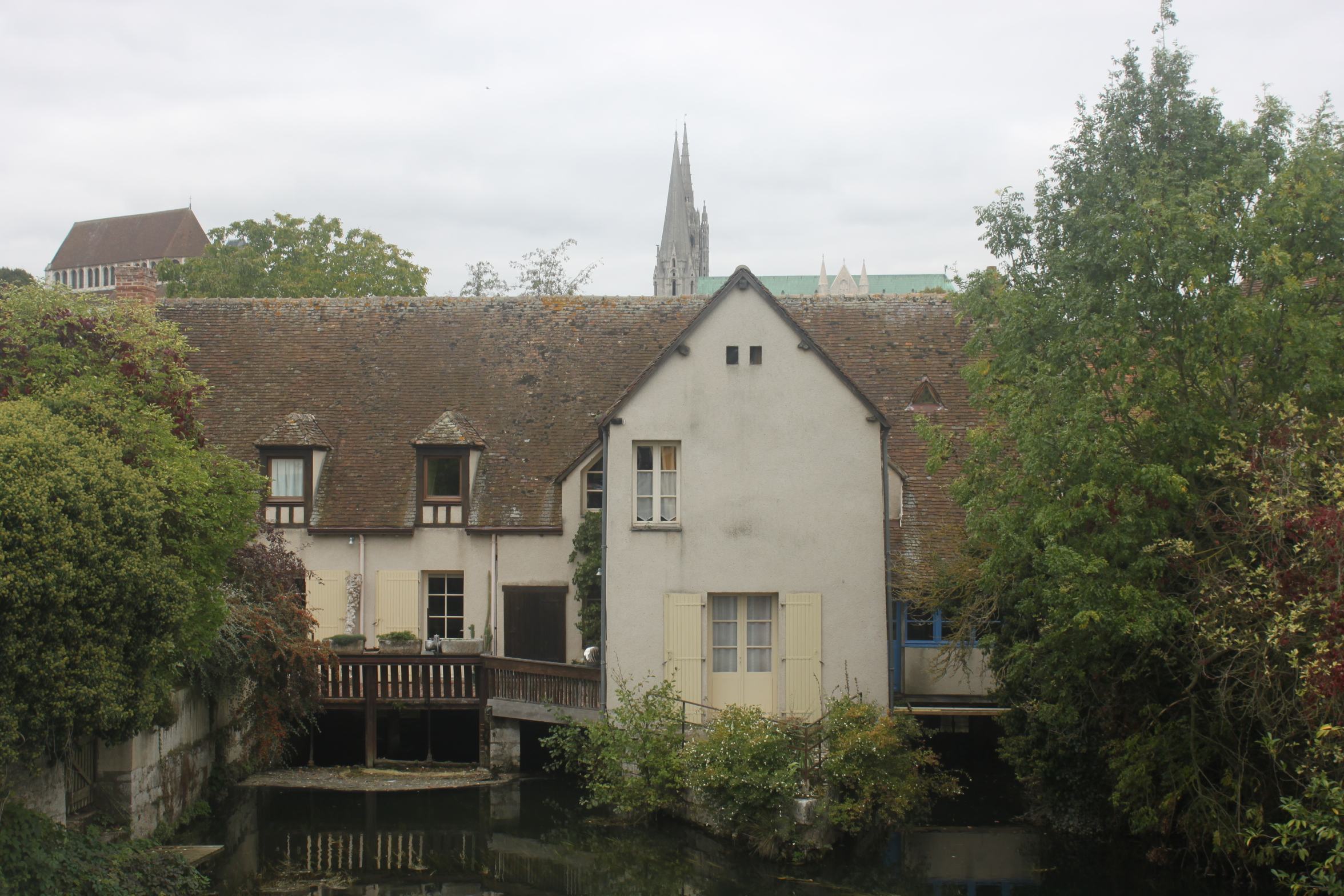
The 11th-century mill as it appears today. Its original works are intact.

A list of abbots can only be compiled from the adoption of the Benedictine rule onwards. From Philip II on, all the abbots were commendatory only.

1. Alveus (Auvé)
  He was a canon, described as both presbiter (priest) and archiclavus (high key-bearer, that is, administrator) in a document of 940. He was assigned by Ragenfred to obtain twelve monks from the abbey of Saint-Benoît-sur-Loire to initiate the Benedictine rule at Saint-Père, but he died before 954.
2. Arembert
  He was placed at the head of the abbey by Harduin, Ragenfred's successor.
3. Widbert (Guibert)
  He was consecrated by Wulfard, Harduin's successor, and wrote a passion of Saint Éman.
4. Giselbert, before 984 – 15 January 1002
5. Magenard, 1002 – 29 March 1022
  He was imposed on the monks without an election by Count Theobald II of Blois after the death of Giselbert, which caused the monks to flee to the abbey of Saint-Pierre de Lagny, led by one of their own, Herbert. After two or three years, the monks were reconciled to Magenard and returned. He died in office.
6. Arnulf (Arnoul), died 8 March 1031 or 1033
7. Landry, died 14 March 1067 or 1069
8. Hubert, 1067/9–1078
  He was forced out by the monks, then recalled by them in 1075. He was forced out a second time in 1078 and died in the priory at Brezolles.
9. Eustace, 1079–1101
  He resigned and died on 2 May 1102.
10. William I, died 22 December 1129 or 1130
11. Udo or Odo (Eudes), died16 September 1150
12. Fulcher (Foucher), died 17 May 1171
13. Stephen I, died 22 or 26 April 1193
14. Ernald (Ernaud), died 25 July 1198
15. Guy I, died 8 August 1231
16. Gilon, died 18 May 1254
17. Guy II, called Redneck (Cou-Rouge), died 21 June 1272
18. Barthélemy Filesac, resigned 1293
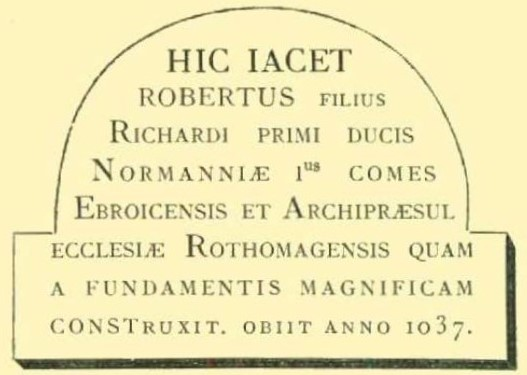
  Sketch of the 18th-century plaque marking the tomb of Archbishop Robert the Dane in Saint-Père
  He died 3 September 1309.
19. Michael, died 1295
20. Vincent Gastelier, 1296–1299
21. Hervé, died 21 March 1306
22. John I (Jean de Mante), died 1310
23. Philip I (Philippe de Cereis), died 1329
24. Nicolas de Brou, died 17 July 1341
25. Peter I, called Pierre à la Plommée, died 11 November 1349
26. William II (Guillaume Desjardins), died 14 or 24 August 1394
27. Stephen II (Étienne le Baillif), died 26 April 1416
28. Peter II (Pierre Chouart), died 5 July 1429
29. John II (Jean Jourdain), resigned 1464, died 14 May 1465
30. John III (Jean Pinart), died 13 January 1480
31. Philip II (Philippe de La Chapelle), resigned 1491
32. Germain de Ganay, died 8 March 1520
  He was also the bishop of Cahors from 1510 and bishop of Orléans from 1514.
33. François de Brilhac, died 4 April 1540
34. Charles de Hémard de Denonville, died 23 August 1540
  He was also the bishop of Mâcon and a cardinal.
35. Pierre de Brisay, deposed 1571
  He was a nephew of his predecessor through his mother. He converted to Protestantism and abandoned the abbey in 1571. He married Jacqueline d'Orléans-Longueville in 1575 and died on 1 June 1582.
36. Jean Helvys or Héluye (John IV), resigned 1582
37. Claude d'Aumale, died 3 January 1591
  Nicknamed the Chevalier d'Aumale, he was a member of the Catholic League who was killed in the attack on Saint-Denis.
38. Philippe Hurault de Cheverny (Philip III), appointed 31 January 1595, died 27 May 1620
  The son of the chancellor of France, he was only fifteen years old when appointed. He became the bishop of Chartres in 1599.
39. Henri Hurault de Cheverny, resigned 1625
  He was a nephew of his predecessor.
40. Philippe Hurault de Cheverny (Philip IV), resigned 1625
  He was a brother of his predecessor.
41. Louis I Barbier de La Rivière, died 30 January 1670
  He was the bishop of Langres from 1655. During his abbacy, the monks joined the Congregation of Saint-Maur.
42. Raymond Bérenger de Lorraine-Harcourt, died 1686
  He was the son of Henri de Lorraine-Harcourt.
43. Philippe de Lorraine-Harcourt (Philip V), died 7 December 1702
  Nicknamed the Chevalier de Lorraine, he was the brother of his predecessor. He was the lover of Philippe I, Duke of Orléans.
44. Louis II de Thésut, died October 1730
45. Louis-François Lopis de La Fare, died 1762
46. Joseph-Alphonse de Véri, until 1781

No abbot was named after 1781.
