= Julienne-Hippolyte-Joséphine, Duchess of Villars =

Duchess of Villars (c. 1575–1667)

Julienne-Hippolyte-Joséphine
- Duchess of Villars
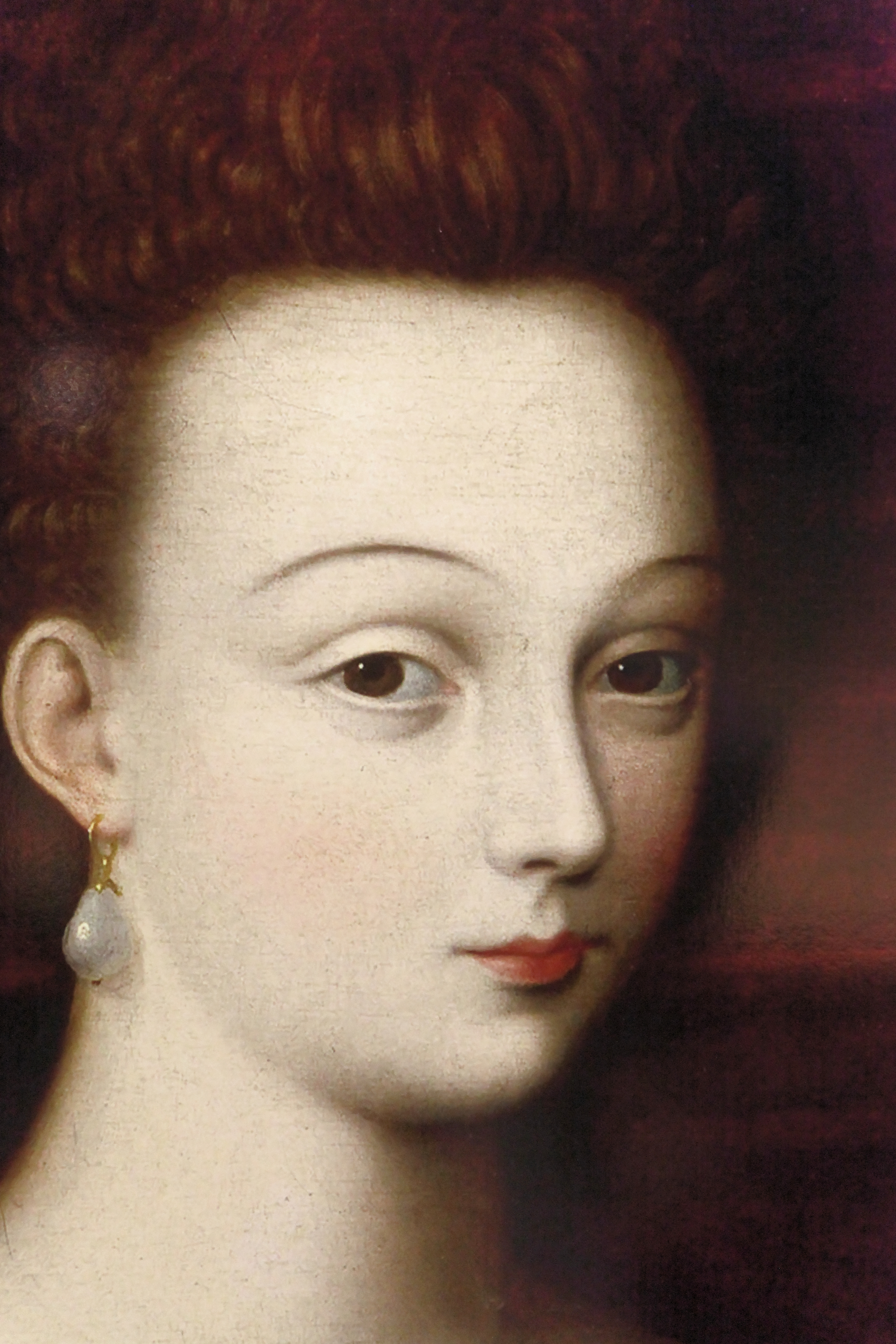
- Julienne depicted in Gabrielle d'Estrées et une de ses sœurs
- Born: 1575
- Died: 1667 (aged 92)
- Spouse: George de Brancas (m. 1596; died 1657)
- Issue Detail: Marie de Brancas; Charles de Brancas; Louis François de Brancas
- House: Estrées
- Father: Antoine d'Estrées
- Mother: Françoise Babou de La Bourdaisière

Julienne Brancas (née Julienne-Hippolyte-Joséphine d’Estrées; c. 1575 – 1667) was a French courtier. She was the daughter to Antoine d'Estrées and Françoise Babou de La Bourdaisière. She is widely known for being the model for the portrait Gabrielle d'Estrées et une de ses sœurs, in which she is seen sitting in a bathtub unclothed pinching her sister's nipple.

== Biography ==
Born Julienne-Hippolyte-Joséphine d'Estrées to Antoine d'Estrées and Françoise Babou de La Bourdaisière, she was their youngest child and had three siblings: François Annibal, Gabrielle and Angélique d'Estrées.

On 5 January 1597, Julienne married George de Brancas. Tallemant des Reaux, in the Historiettes, claims that Julienne bribed a priest at Saint Paul in order for her to marry George.

George de Brancas and Julienne d'Estrées had three children together, their first being a daughter named Marie. In 1618, Julienne gave birth to their second child, a son, named Charles. The last child was a son named Louis François.

In approximately 1667, Julienne died, the cause unknown. She was most likely 92, but since many birth dates and death dates are contradicted, her age is uncertain. Her husband George died before her, in 1657.

== Portrayal in art ==
In c. 1594 a portrait of Julienne and her sister Gabrielle was painted (Gabrielle d'Estrées et une de ses sœurs). The portrait portrays Julienne and Gabrielle both seated unclothed from the waistline and upwards in a bathtub lined with grey cloth. Julienne is situated on the left, pinching Gabrielle’s right nipple whilst Gabrielle holds a coronation ring given to her by King Henry IV of France. In the back, a woman is seen stitching by a fireplace.

Another portrait with Julienne and her sister was painted at the Fontainebleau School by an unidentified artist. The portrait portrays Julienne and Gabrielle situated in a bathtub lined with grey cloth, similar to that of the one they appeared in beforehand. Julienne and Gabrielle are both unclothed whilst a woman in the back breastfeeds a child. Instead of a coronation ring, Gabrielle is seen wearing a strand of pearls around her neck.

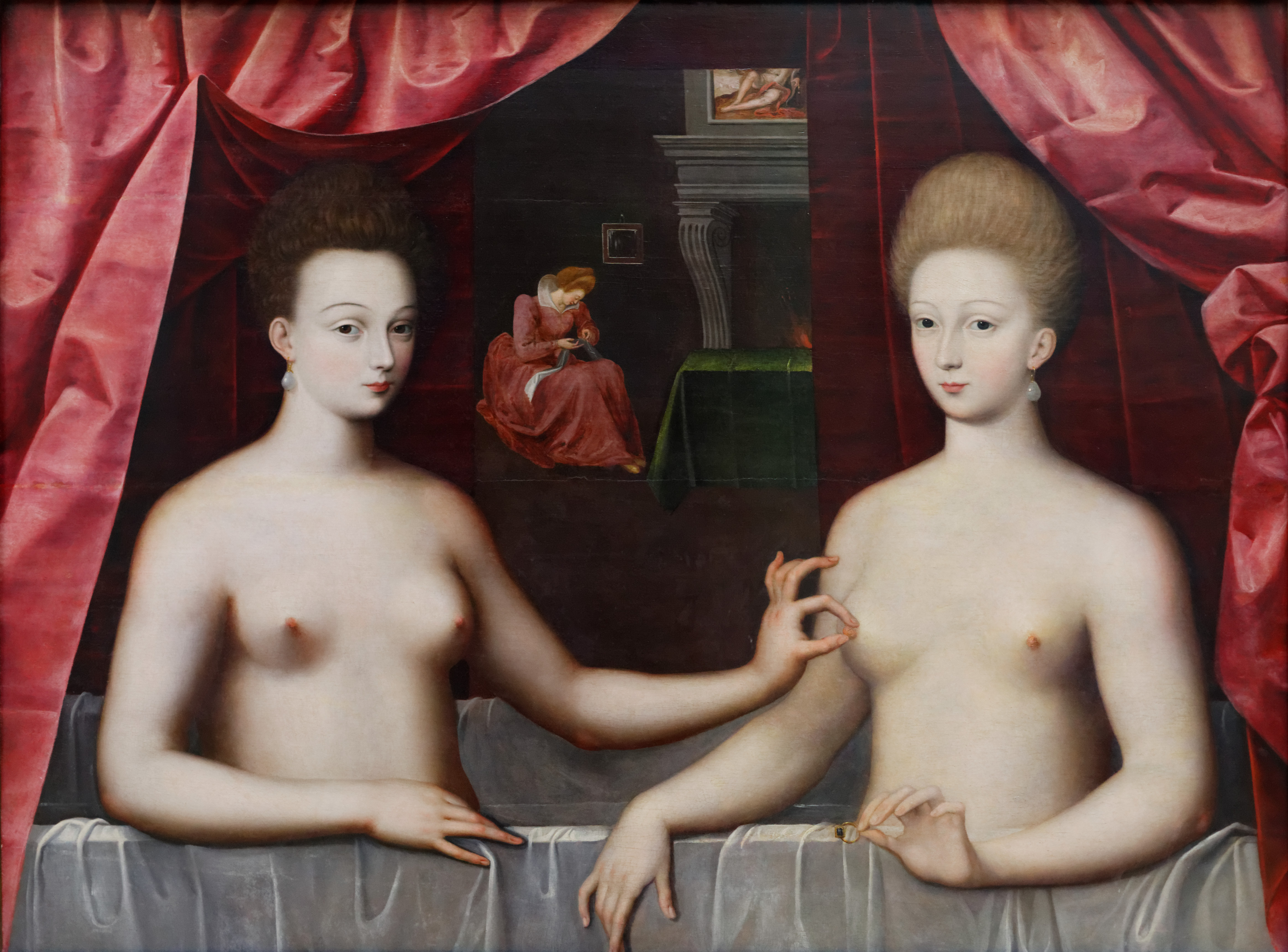
Gabrielle d'Estrées et une de ses sœurs: Julienne d’Estrées is on the left; Gabrielle d’Estrées is on the right.

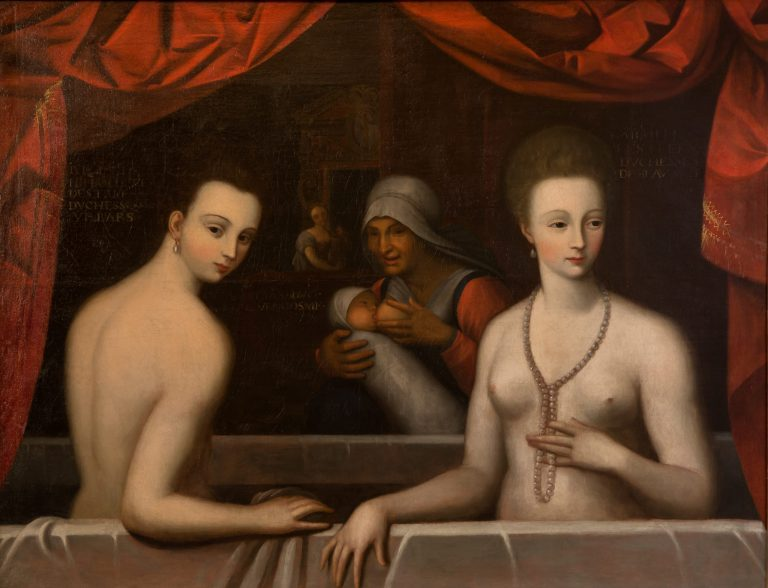
Gabrielle d’Estrées and her sister, the Duchess of Villars: Julienne d’Estrées is on the left; Gabrielle d’Estrées is on the right.

== Children ==
1. Marie de Brancas de Villars, c. 1598
2. Charles de Brancas (1618 – 8 January 1681); married Suzanne Garnier and had issue.
3. Louis François de Brancas (died 1679); married to M Madeleine Girard and had issue. Married to Louise Catherine Angélique de Fautereau de Mainières and had issue.

== Sources ==
- Garrisson, Janine (2006). Gabrielle d'Estrées: aux marches du palais (in French). Tallandier.
- Hagen, Rose-Marie; Hagen, Rainer (2003). What Great Paintings Say. Vol. 2. Taschen. ISBN 978-3-8228-1372-0.
- Pardoe, Julia (2010). The Life of Marie de Medicis, Queen of France. Cambridge University Press.
