= Baboo =

Baboo may refer to:

- An alternative spelling of the Indian honorific Babu
- Baboo (airline), an airline based in Grand-Saconnex, Switzerland
- Baboo (band), 1990s Taiwan rock band
- A villain in the Power Rangers, fictional universe
- Baboo English, a dialect of English

== People ==
- Baboo Da Silva (born 1967), Brazilian kyokushin kaikan full contact karate practitioner, former professional kickboxer and mixed martial artist
- Baboo Nimal (1908–1998), Indian field hockey player
- Dinesh Baboo, Indian film director, cinematographer, producer, actor and screenwriter
- Sweet Baboo, real name Stephen Black, musician from Wales
- Baboo Lal Verma (born 1955), an Indian politician
- Baboo Khan, Indian politician

== See also ==
- Babou (disambiguation)
- Babu (disambiguation)
