= Antoine d'Estrées =

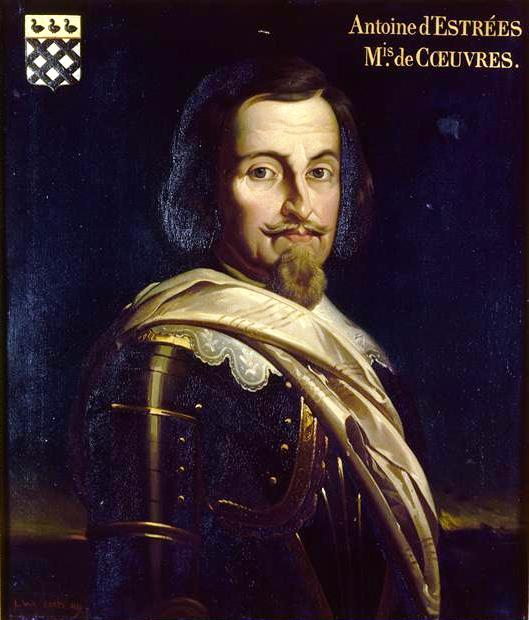
Antoine d'Estrées, Marquis of Cœuvres

Antoine d'Estrées (1529 – 11 May 1609) was Marquis of Coeuvres, vicomte of Soissons and of Bercy, Knight of the Order of Saint-Esprit in 1578 and Knight of the Order of Saint-Michel also in 1578. He was made gentleman of the chamber for Francis, Duke of Anjou, and later was made governor of several territories.

== Biography ==
Antoine was the son of Jean d'Estrées, Count of Orbec and Marquis of Cœuvres Catherine de Bourbon. He was born some time during 1529.

In 1558, he married Françoise Babou de La Bourdaisière and had at least nine children, the most famous being:

- Gabrielle d'Estrées
- François Annibal d'Estrées
- Julienne-Hippolyte-Joséphine d’Estrées
- Angélique d’Estrées

== Sources ==
- Wellman, Kathleen (2013). Queens and Mistresses of Renaissance France. Yale University Press.
