= Marie Gaudin =

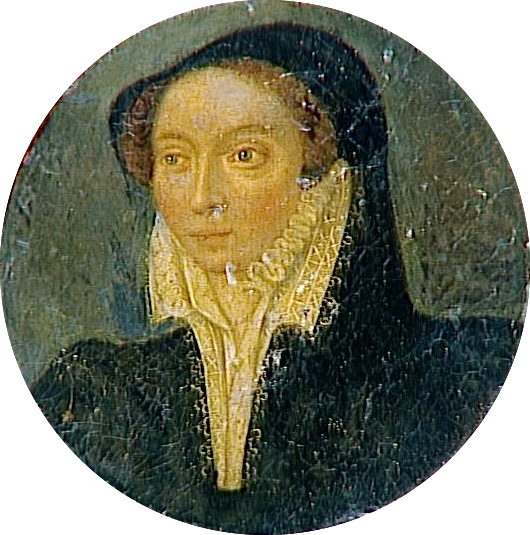
Portrait of Marie Gaudin, Dame de La Bourdaisière. Anonymous, 16th century, Musée national de la Renaissance, Château d'Écouen

Marie Gaudin (French pronunciation: [maʁi ɡodɛ̃]; 1495–1580), Dame de La Bourdaisière and de Thuisseau, was a French lady-in-waiting, known as the lover of Francis I, King of France, and also of Pope Leo X.

== Biography ==
Marie Gaudin was the daughter of the queen's treasurer, Victor Gaudin, Seigneur de Thuisseau et de La Bourdaisière, and Agnès Morin, Lady of Ralluères. She was the granddaughter of Jehan Gaudin and the niece of Nicolas Gaudin, who were both mayor of Tours.

She married Philibert Babou, Seigneur de Givray, in Tours on 28 April 1510. She served as lady-in-waiting to the queen of France, Eleanor of Austria.

Considered to be the most beautiful woman of her time, Marie Gaudin, was the first ("unofficial") mistress of Francis I of France at the very beginning of his reign, but their relationship did not become public. Much later, Francis is said to have also shared "the graces of the king" with her three daughters, also "of great beauty", who "successively inherited the royal favour, which they purchased, as their mother had purchased it, at the expense of their honour."

The couple's wealth was based on her relationship with the king and the resulting offices and benefits: Philibert Babou became Minister of Finance, Treasurer of the Savings Chest in 1522, Superintendent of Finances in 1524, and Master of the King's Household and a member of the King's Private Council in 1544. The couple were close to the Medici family.

In 1515, Marie Gaudin and Philibert Babou accompanied the French king during his stay in Bologna, where she met and had an affair with Pope Leo X. On 11 December 1515, at Francis's meeting with the pope, Leo X gave her a diamond of great value, since called the Diamant Gaudin, in memory of the "favours" she had granted him. (Note: Reports that she was also mistress of Charles V, Holy Roman Emperor (who was the brother of the queen of France, Eleanor) when he visited Francis I are not substantiated.) Negotiations during the stay led to the Concordat of Bologna, which was signed in Rome on 18 August 1516.

In 1520, Francis gifted to Marie Gaudin the 14th century castle of La Bourdaisière in Montlouis-sur-Loire, which she and Babou decided to rebuild.

Marie Gaudin's and Philibert Babou's three daughters served as models for the representation of "the Three Marys" (Note: Mary Magdalene, Mary, mother of James, and Mary Salome (Mark 16:1)) on an Enterrement du Christ for a tomb in the castle chapel of Notre-Dame de Bondésir in La Bourdaisière (very probably the tomb of Philibert Babou), on which Marie Gaudin represented the Virgin Mary. The chapel was founded on 15 April 1544, and Philibert Babou stated in his will on 9 September 1557, shortly before his death, that he wanted to be buried there. Marie Gaudin declared this in 1564, after Philibert and some of the couple's children had already been buried in the chapel.

In the church of Saint-Denis in Amboise there is a reclining figure (gisant), which is usually referred to as the "Statue of the Drowned Woman" (Statue de la femme noyée), and is considered to be the tombstone of Marie Gaudin. As early as 1828 it was suspected that the figure came from the chapel of Notre-Dame de Bondésir, which was demolished in 1780, and that it was the gravestone of Marie Gaudin. The gisant was moved before the demolition, was in the church of Saint-Florentin in Amboise at the beginning of the 19th century, was brought to the castle of Amboise in 1864 and to the chapel of Saint-Hubert in 1894. Since 1904 the figure has been considered a historic monument after it was long considered "indecent" and offensive by the clergy and believers because it is unclothed.
