= Françoise Babou de La Bourdaisière =

Françoise Babou
- Marquise of Coeuvres vicomtess of Soissons and of Bercy
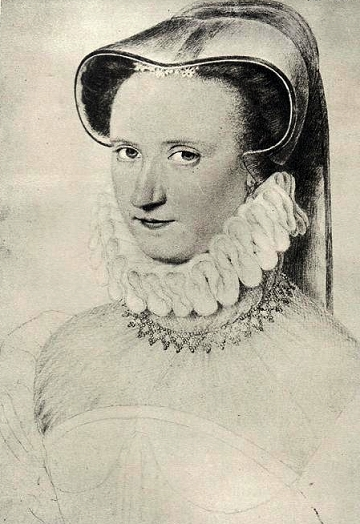
- Francoise Babou de La Bourdaisiere
- Born: Françoise Babou; 1542
- Died: 9 June 1592 (aged 49–50)
- Spouse: Antoine d'Estrées (m. 1558)
- Issue among others…: François Annibal, Duc d’Estrées; Gabrielle d'Estrées, Duchess of Beaufort and Verneuil; Angélique, Abbess of Maubisson; Julienne-Hypolite-Joséphine, Duchess of Villars
- Father: Jean Babou de La Bourdaisière
- Mother: Françoise Robertet

Françoise Babou de La Bourdaisière, Marquise of Coeuvres, vicomtess of Soissons and of Bercy (French pronunciation: [fʁɑ̃swaz babu də la buʁdezjɛʁ]; 1542 – 9 June 1592) was the mistress of a favourite of the king, Du Guast. She married Antoine d'Estrées in 1558, and they were the parents of Gabrielle d'Estrées—mistress of King Henry IV of France.

== Life ==
Françoise Babou was the eldest daughter of Jean Babou de La Bourdaisière (1511–1569) and Françoise Robertet (1515-1580). She was described by Gédéon Tallemant des Réaux in his Historiettes as the “most prolific clan of gallant women who ever existed in France.” Francoise received an upbringing at the French royal court—as a fille d'honneur (maid of honour) to Mary Stuart. She remained in this post until Mary's marriage in 1558, and then served as dame d'honneur to Mary until she left for Scotland. Françoise served in the same position to Queen Louise in 1575–1583.

Françoise Babou lived with separate rooms from her husband during her years in service at court and had an affair with du Guast. He was killed in a duel in 1575.

In 1583 she left the court and her husband permanently to live with her lover Yves d'Alègre on his estates in the Auvergne. In 1589, Yves d'Alègre was appointed governor of Issoire in Auvergne by Henry III. She accompanied him there, and they ruled the city together. With his approval, she introduced sumptuary laws with death penalty. Their rule was highly unpopular, and in 1592, they were both assassinated for political reasons by citizens who broke in to their home.

She is a subject of the writings by Brantôme.

=== Death ===
On 9 June 1592, an angry mob broke into their house—where Yves and Françoise were sleeping—and stabbed Yves in the chest, killing him. The mob dragged Françoise into a bedroom and stabbed her in the heart. The corpses of Françoise and Yves were then thrown off the balcony and onto the streets, where they were stripped and denuded. Their naked bodies were displayed in a public square.

== Issue ==
- Marie Catherine (1562 – 1565); died in childhood.
- Marguerite (1565 – 7 July 1590); married Gabriel Bournel, Baron de Mouchy.
- Diane (1566 – 1618); married Jean de Monluc in 1596, and became the mistress of Jean-Louis, Duc d’Épernon.
- Angélique (1570 – 1634); became abbess of Maubuisson.
- Gabrielle (1571 – 10 April 1599); became mistress of Henry IV of France.
- François Annibal (1573 – 1670); became Maréchal de France.
- Julienne-Hippolyte-Joséphine, Duchess of Villars (c. 1575 – 1680); married George de Brancas and became duchess of Villars.

== Sources ==
- Wellman, Kathleen (2013). Queens and Mistresses of Renaissance France. Yale University Press.
