= César d'Estrées =

French diplomat and cardinal

- Cardinal-Bishop of Albano
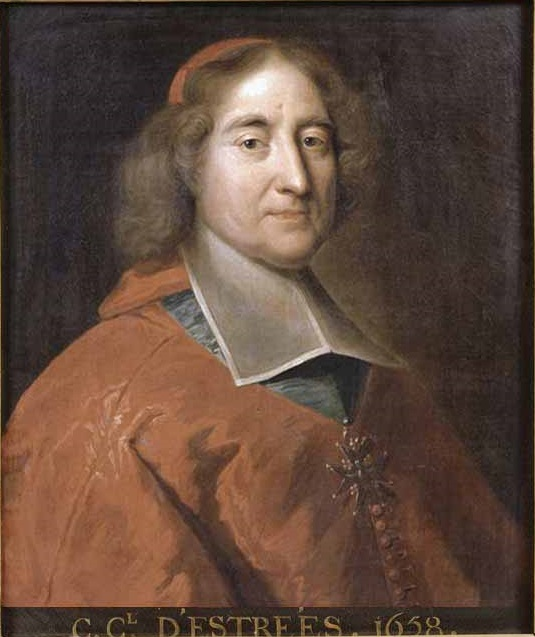
- Portrait of César d'Estrées (1658)
- Church: Catholic Church
- See: Suburbicarian Diocese of Albano
- In office: 15 September 1698 – 18 December 1714
- Predecessor: Cardinal de Bouillon
- Successor: Ferdinando d'Adda
- Previous posts: Cardinal-Priest of Santissima Trinità al Monte Pincio (1675-1698); Bishop of Laon (1655-1681); Cardinal-Priest of Santa Maria in Via (1672-1675)

Orders
- Consecration: 26 September 1655 by Henri de Béthune
- Created cardinal: 24 August 1671 by Pope Clement X

Personal details
- Born: 5 February 1628 Paris, Kingdom of France
- Died: 18 December 1714 (aged 86) Paris, Kingdom of France

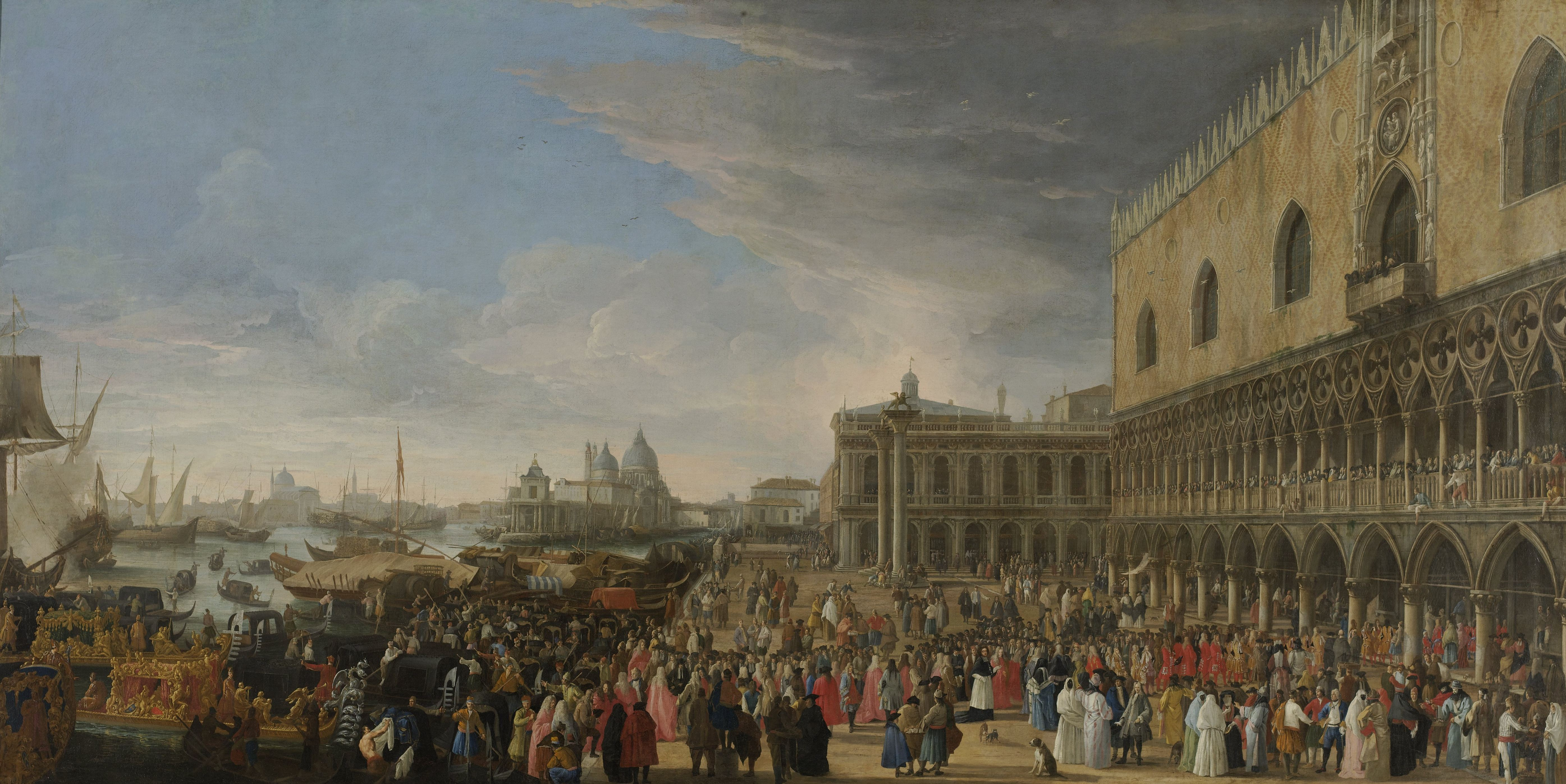
"Reception of Cardinal César d'Estrées in Venice" Painting by Luca Carlevaris (1701)

César d'Estrées (5 February 1628 – 18 December 1714) was a French diplomat and cardinal.

== Biography ==
Estrées was born and died in Paris. He was the son of Marshal François Annibal d'Estrées and nephew of Gabrielle d'Estrées, mistress of King Henri IV. His brother was Marshal Jean II d'Estrées.

Estrées was abbot of the Abbey of Saint-Germain-des-Prés, Duke-Bishop of Laon and a cardinal. He was also French ambassador in Rome and Spain, commander in the Order of the Holy Spirit and a pair de France. He was elected member of the Académie française in 1658 (Seat 9).

== Literature ==
- Charles Berton: Dictionnaire des cardinaux. Contenant des notions générales sur le cardinalat. J.-P. Migne, Paris 1857, col. 884–886
- Honoré Fisquet: La France pontificale (Gallia christiana), histoire chronologique et biographique des archevêques et évêques de tous les diocèses de France depuis l’établissement du christianisme jusqu’à nos jours, divisée en 17 provinces ecclésiastique. Vol. 2. E. Repos, Paris 1866, p. 306
