= Angélique, Abbess of Maubisson =

Angélique d'Estrées (1570–1634) was the abbess of Maubuisson Abbey. She was the fourth child of Antoine d'Estrées and Françoise Babou de La Bourdaisière.

== Biography ==
Born in 1570, Angélique was the fourth daughter of Françoise Babou de La Bourdaisière and Antoine d'Estrées. In 1580, before her transfer to Maubuisson Abbey, she became a nun at Saint-Louis de Poissy.

In 1597, Angélique became the 20th abbess of Maubuisson Abbey, at the age of 27. Before her arrival at the abbey, it was said that Angélique—similar to that of her mother's behaviour—had numerous affairs, and continued the affairs during her time as abbess. Her scandalous ways at the abbey resulting in her banishment and removal to a home for “delinquents”.

Angélique died in 1634, at the age of 64, in Paris, France.
