= Philippe Hurault de Cheverny (bishop of Chartres) =

French bishop

- Church: Catholic
- Diocese: Chartres
- Other post(s): abbot in commendam of the Abbey of Saint-Père-en-Vallée

Personal details
- Born: 1579
- Died: 1620
- Parents: Philippe Hurault de Cheverny

Philippe Hurault de Cheverny (1579–1620), a bishop of Chartres. He was a son of Philippe Hurault de Cheverny, a chancellor of France. He was a bibliophile and book collector. He was also abbot in commendam of the Abbey of Saint-Père-en-Vallée.

== See also ==
- Catholic Church in France
