= Gabrielle d'Estrées et une de ses sœurs =

16th-century French painting in the Louvre

Portrait présumé de Gabrielle d'Estrées et de sa soeur la duchesse de Villars
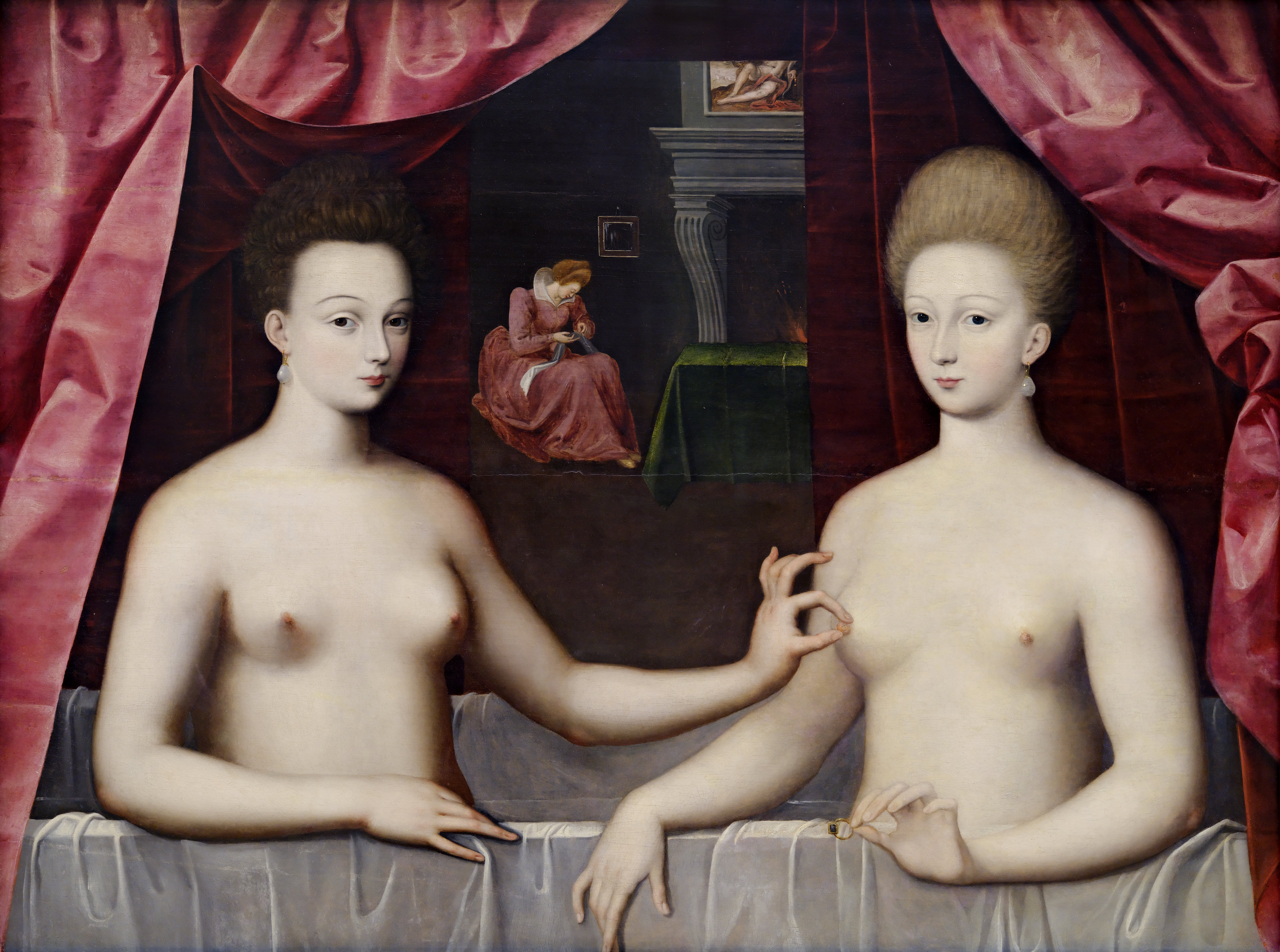
- Artist: Unknown
- Year: circa 1594
- Type: oil on wood
- Dimensions: 96 cm × 125 cm (38 in × 49 in)
- Location: Louvre, Paris

Gabrielle d'Estrées et une de ses soeurs (Gabrielle d'Estrées and one of her sisters) is a painting by an unknown artist dated c. 1594. It is in the Louvre in Paris and is usually thought to be the work of a painter from the Fontainebleau School. A second, clothed version was produced by the same school shortly afterwards.

== Description ==
The painting portrays Gabrielle d'Estrées, mistress of King Henry IV of France, sitting in a bath, holding a ring. Her sister Julienne-Hyppolite-Joséphine sits beside her and pinches d'Estrées' right nipple. Both women are nude apart from their pearl earrings, and visible over the rim of the tub from their waists upward. The women are revealed by a parting curtain, as though in a stage play. A seamstress works in the background beside a large fireplace with a painting of a male nude hung above.

== History ==
In the early years of the seventeenth century, Pierre de Bourdeille, seigneur de Brantôme told a story about a group of people who went to view the painting. He described the painting as showing "fair naked ladies" together in a bath, and adds that they "touch, and feel, and handle, and stroke, one the other, and intertwine and fondle with each other." Brantôme claims he was told that, while the group was viewing the painting, "a certain great lady... losing all restraint of herself before the picture, [did] say to her lover, turning toward him maddened as it were at the madness of love she beheld painted; 'Too long have we tarried here. Let us now straightway take coach and so to my lodging; for that no more can I hold in the ardour that is in me. Needs must away and quench it; too sore do I burn...'"

During the first half of the nineteenth century, Gabrielle d'Estrées et une de ses soeurs hung in the Prefecture of Police in Paris. Dr. Ver Heyden de Lacey stated in an article from 1935 that "Nobody knew why or how it came there; [it was] placed above a door in one of the halls to which the public had access." He explained that one day, a "pusillanimous high official" noticed the painting and "conceived [of] the idea to screen the picture...from the curious public gaze, by drawing a green curtain in front of it." His action suggested that the official considered the painting to be erotic or even obscene, but instead of removing it, he had it veiled, and thus visibly marked the image as an open secret, or as something which should not be seen. At some point after that, Dr. Ver Heyden de Lacey claimed that "Somebody had the happy inspiration to expose [the veiled image] to the artistic and art-trained eyes of those called upon to take part in [a] civic function [at the police station] ... In preparation [for this] special function ... a thorough cleaning of the picture itself was ordered .... [But] Upon drawing the curtain, [they found only] an empty picture frame."

== Interpretations ==
=== Traditional: announcing Gabrielle's pregnancy ===
The nipple-pinching gesture has been interpreted as a symbolic announcement that Gabrielle is pregnant with Henry's child, César de Bourbon. According to the Louvre's website: "The oddly affectionate way in which the sister is pinching Gabrielle d'Estrées' right breast has often been taken as symbolizing the latter's pregnancy with the illegitimate child of Henry IV. This interpretation would seem to be confirmed by the scene of the young woman sewing – perhaps preparing a layette for the coming child – in the background." The ring that Gabrielle holds is said to be Henry's coronation ring, which he may have given to her as a token of his love shortly before she died.

=== Modern interpretation ===
In the twentieth and twenty-first centuries, the Gabrielle d'Estrées painting is often understood to represent female homosexuality, despite the fact that the women depicted are in fact sisters. It is listed in Lesbian Histories and Cultures: An Encyclopedia by Bonnie Zimmerman, and also appears on websites about lesbian history such as Sappho.com.

== Legacy ==
Julienne's pinching motion was a personal fascination of artist Michael Taylor, who referenced it in Boy with Apple.

Even outside of the LGBT community, the painting is frequently used as a representation of lesbianism. In 1991, it appeared on the cover of the French magazine L’Événement du jeudi to illustrate a story on lesbian chic. In 2002, the German Green Party created a poster to announce their support of same-sex marriage, featuring two female models reenacting the Gabrielle portrait in the foreground while two male models reenact it in the background.
