= Alexandre, Chevalier de Vendôme =

Illegitimate son of Henry IV of France

Alexandre de Vendôme
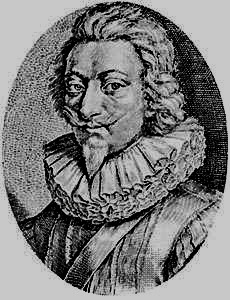

Chevalier de Vendôme

Prior of the Order

Knight of the Order

Governor of Caen

Personal details
- Born: 19 April 1598
- Died: 28 February 1629 (aged 30)
- Parents: Henry IV of France (father); Gabrielle d'Estrées (mother)

Alexandre de Vendôme (19 April 1598 – 28 February 1629) was the third illegitimate child, and second illegitimate son, of Henry IV of France and his mistress Gabrielle d'Estrées. He was a prior of the Langue of France of the Order of Saint John of Jerusalem.

== Biography ==
Baptized in Saint-Germain-en-Laye on 13 December 1598, he was governor of Caen from birth throughout his life and entered the Order of Saint John of Jerusalem in 1604. King Louis XIII, his half-brother, appointed him to lead an embassy to Pope Paul V at Rome in October 1614.

In 1626 alongside his brother César, Duke of Vendôme and half-brother Gaston, Duke of Orléans, he participated in the Chalais conspiracy, directed against Cardinal Richelieu, who was the Prime Minister of his half-brother, King Louis XIII. Arrested, he was incarcerated in Amboise, then in Vincennes where he died.

== Bibliography ==
- Laurent Sonnius, ed. (1615). RECIT (le) de l'arrivée solemnelle entrée du très-illustre & excellent seigneur Messire Alexandre de Vendosme frère naturel de sa Majesté très-chrestienne, Grand Prieur de Tholose, de la Religion & de l'Ordre de Jérusalem. Faicte à Rome le 2 octobre 1615 avec la cavalcade de la Sainte Église au Consistoire public & autres particularités. Traduit d'Italien en Français (in French). Paris. Note: Contains a description of the spectacular procession as his embassy entered Rome.
- Henri de Curzon (1886). "Une réception au Temple. Alexandre de Vendôme, 1er février 1604". Bibliothèque de l'École des chartes (in French) (47): 106–117. doi:10.3406/bec.1886.447440. hdl:2027/hvd.32044088713433.
