= Louis Barbier =

- Bishop of Langres
- Church: Catholic Church
- Diocese: Diocese of Langres
- In office: 15 November 1655 – 30 January 1670
- Predecessor: Sébastien Zamet
- Successor: Louis Armand de Simiane de Gordes

Orders
- Consecration: 2 January 1656 by Anne de Lévis de Ventadour

Personal details
- Born: Louis Barbier de La Rivière; 1593 Vandélicourt, Picardy, Kingdom of France
- Died: 30 January 1670 (aged 76–77)

Louis Barbier (1593–1670), known as Abbé de la Rivière, was a French bishop, born in Vandélicourt, near Compiègne, France. He entered the church and made his way until he was appointed tutor and then became the friend and adviser of Gaston d'Orléans, brother of Louis XIII. He thus gained an entrance to the court, became grand almoner of the queen, and received the revenue of rich abbeys, such at Saint-Père-en-Vallée.

In March 1655 he was named bishop of Langres, but he spent his time at court, where he was always in demand, and where he gained great sums by gambling. He died very rich.

He willed 100 écus to the person who would write his epitaph, and got the following on his tomb:

Ci-gît un très grand personage, Qui fut d'un illustre lignage, Qui posséda mille vertus, Qui ne trompa jamais, qui fut toujours fort sage... Je n'en dirai pas d'avantage, C'est trop mentir pour cent écus.	Here lies a great dignitary, Descended from an illustrious lineage, Who possessed a thousand virtues, Who never deceived, and was always well behaved... I will say nothing of the benefit, Of lying so much for 100 écus.
