= Philippe Hurault de Cheverny =

French nobleman and politician

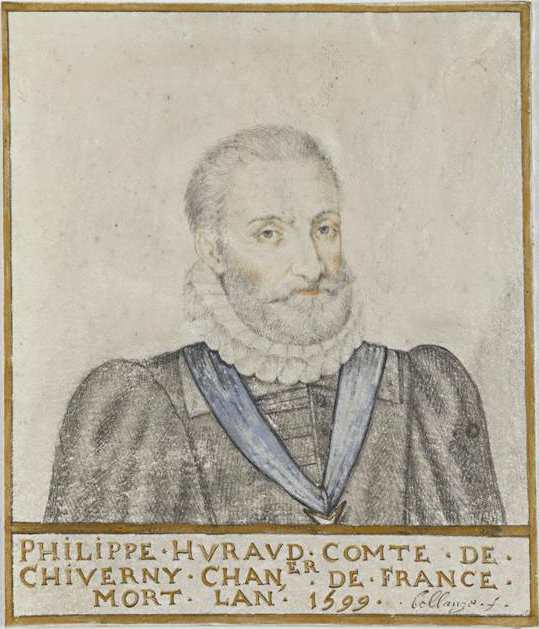
Portrait of Philippe Hurault by Thierry Bellange

Philippe Hurault, comte de Cheverny (1528 in Cheverny, Loir-et-Cher – 1599) was a French nobleman and politician. His son Philippe Hurault de Cheverny was a bishop.

== Life ==
He was counsellor to the parlement de Paris, maître des requêtes (1562), and assisted at the battles of Jarnac and Moncontour. Henri III made him garde des sceaux in 1578 and lieutenant general of the Orléanais and the pays Chartrain in 1582.

After the Day of the Barricades in 1588, he was disgraced by his liaisons with the Catholic League and left court. Henri IV recalled him in August 1590 and again made him garde des sceaux, a post he then held until his death.

He was the son of Raoul Hurault, controller of finances to king Francis I of France. He married Anne de Thou but had a relationship with Isabeau Babou de la Bourdaisière, lady of Sourdis, daughter of Jean Babou and the influential aunt of Henry IV's mistress Gabrielle d'Estrées.

The Hurault had owned the château de Cheverny for several generations but, after it was seized by the king, Philippe Hurault was forced to buy it back from Diane de Poitiers. He had the estate raised to a viscountcy then a comté (in 1582), and also had a house to the east of Paris, on the Roquette estate.

His Mémoires from 1567 to 1599 survive.

== Sources ==
- Bouillet, Marie-Nicolas; Chassang, Alexis, eds. (1878). Dictionnaire Bouillet (in French).

Preceded by René de Birague	Chancellor of France; 1583–1589	Succeeded by Pomponne de Bellièvre
