= Jean d'Estrées, Count of Estrées =

French Navy officer and nobleman

Jean d'Estrées
- Count of Estrées
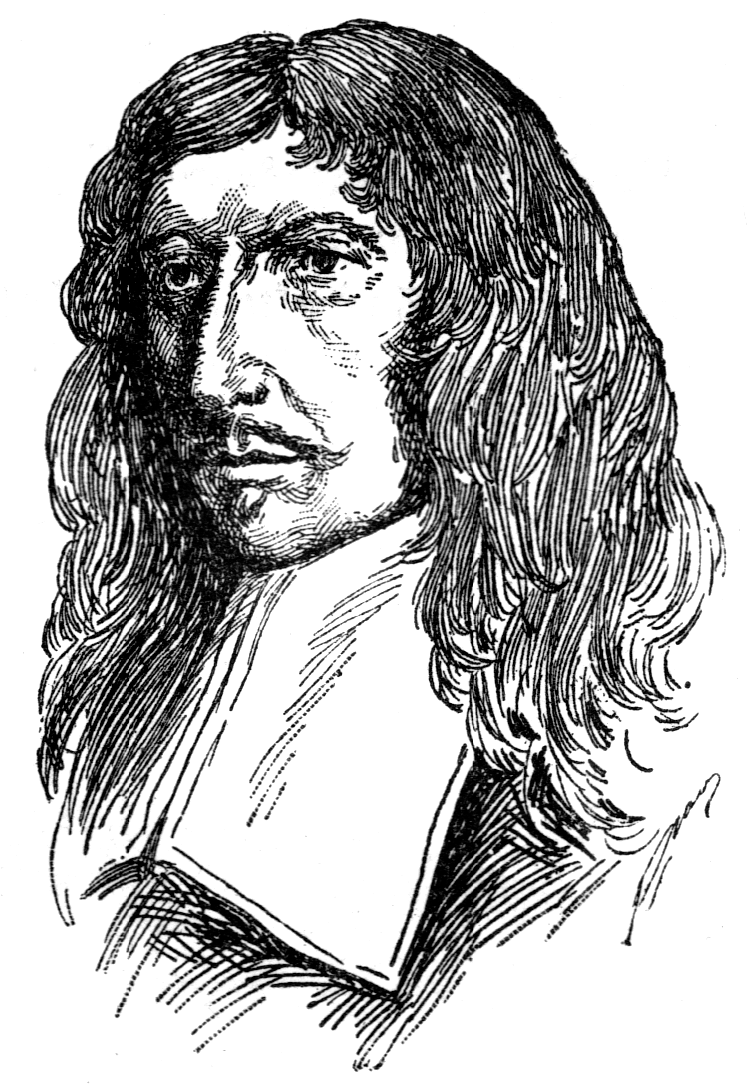
- Engraving of the Count of Estrées
- Full name: Jean d'Estrées
- Born: 3 November 1624; Solothurn, Switzerland
- Died: 19 May 1707 (aged 82); Hôtel d'Estrées, Paris, France
- Spouse: Marie Marguerite Morin
- Issue: Victor Marie, Duke of Estrées; Jean, Archbishop of Cambrai; Marie, Marquise of Courtanvaux
- Father: François Annibal d'Estrées, Duke of Estrées
- Mother: Marie de Béthune

Jean d'Estrées, Count of Estrées (3 November 1624 – 19 May 1707) was a French Navy officer and nobleman who served during the reign of Louis XIV. He was born into an aristocratic family from Picardy. His aunt was Gabrielle d'Estrées, a mistress of King Henry IV of France.

== In the Army ==
Like his father François Annibal d'Estrées, also Marshal of France, Jean pursued a military career from a very young age. He became a colonel at 23, a maréchal de camp at 25 and a lieutenant general at 33.

He fought in the Battle of Lens (1648) under the grand Condé. After that he fought under Turenne in Lorraine in 1652 - 1653 and then in Flanders. He was made prisoner at Valenciennes in 1656.

He was loyal to the royal family during the Fronde.

== In the Navy ==
In 1668 he joined the new French Navy at the request of his friend Colbert. There his patron was the Duke of Beaufort. He rose through the ranks very fast, thanks to the influence of his family name, becoming a Vice-Admiral, and then Marshal of France in 1681.

His first campaign was in the Caribbean. He returned four times, becoming the French naval specialist in the region.

During the Franco-Dutch War, he was put in command of the French fleet which would fight alongside the English fleet against the Dutch. He participated on board the Saint Philippe in the Battle of Solebay in 1672 and the next year on the la Reine, in the Battle of Schooneveld and the Battle of Texel.

In 1676 and 1677, he conquered Gorée, Cayenne and Tobago, destroying the Dutch fleet based there.

== Las Aves Disaster ==
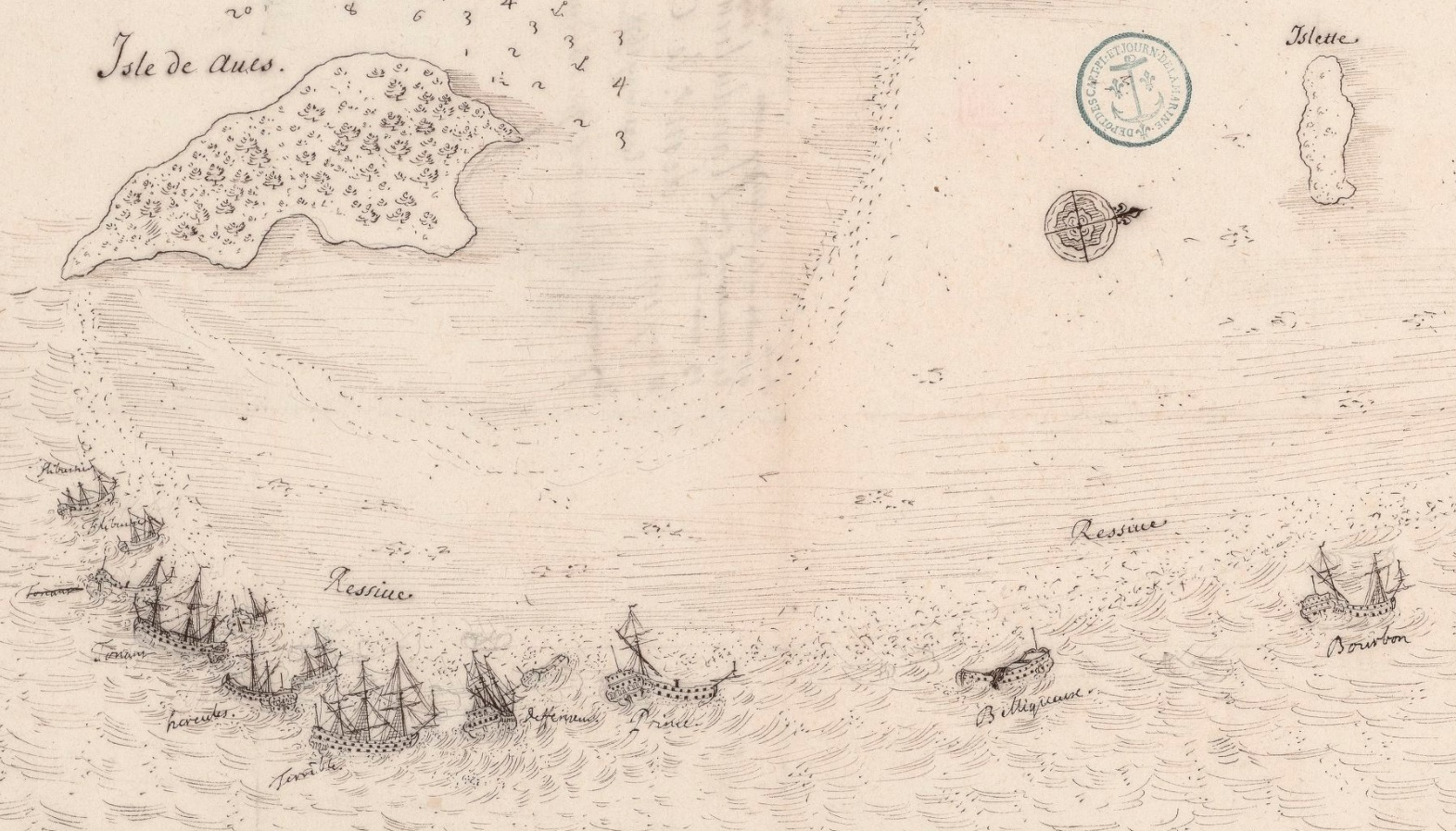
The French squadron stranded on the reefs of the Aves Islands.

Following his successes at Cayenne and Tobago, d'Estrées planned to attack the Dutch at Curaçao island. His fleet—12 men of war, 3 fireships, 2 transports, a hospital ship and 12 privateers—met with disaster, losing 7 of the men of war and 2 other ships when they struck reefs off the Las Aves archipelago due to a navigational error on 11 May 1678, a week after setting sail from Saint Kitts.

According to the captain of d'Estrées flagship Terrible, Nicholas Lefèvre de Méricourt, d'Estrées was solely at fault and had abandoned the ship to its fate. Navy minister Seignelay received other reports, including d'Estrées' own, which told a different story and one more favourable to the unpopular admiral. According to these, the pilots of d'Estrées ships had been unable to agree on their position on the morning of 11 May, and the navigators had been unable to fix their latitude. To avoid the risk of running onto shoals and reefs, d'Estrées sent three privateer ships ahead of the fleet to get timely warning of hazards. When night fell, the privateers fell back closer to the main body, but still ahead of it. These privateers, however, were light ships and of shallow draft, so that they passed over the reef before they even noticed it. They fired guns to warn the fleet following them, but there was not enough time for the large men of war to change course and the result was that nine ships were lost. The loss of life was light, with only 24 sailors being lost, some drowned, dead drunk.

With the loss of half his fleet, d'Estrées had to return to France. He was exonerated of personal responsibility for the disaster.

== Family ==
He married Marie Marguerite Morin and had the following children:

1. Victor Marie d'Estrées, Duke of Estrées (30 November 1660 – 27 December 1737) married Lucie Félicité de Noailles (daughter of Anne Jules de Noailles, Duke of Noailles)
2. Jean d'Estrées (1666 - 3 March 1718), Archbishop of Cambrai.
3. Jean César d'Estrées (1671) died young.
4. Marie Anne d'Estrées (?-1723), nun in Paris.
5. Marie Anne Catherine d'Estrées (1663-1741) married Michel François Le Tellier, Marquis of Courtanvaux, son of the Marquis of Louvois.
