= Philibert Babou =

French treasurer (c. 1484–1557)

Philibert Babou (French pronunciation: [filibɛʁ babu]; c. 1484–1557) was a cryptographer and minister of finance for Francis I. Mayor of Tours in 1520, he was appointed trésorier in 1523, with powers to collect and distribute much of the king's revenue. His son Jean Babou became the Grand Master of Artillery.

Francis I of France took Babou's wife Marie Gaudin as a mistress, and from 1520 he built Château de la Bourdaisière for her.
