= Sébastien Zamet (born 1588) =

French bishop

- Bishop of Langres
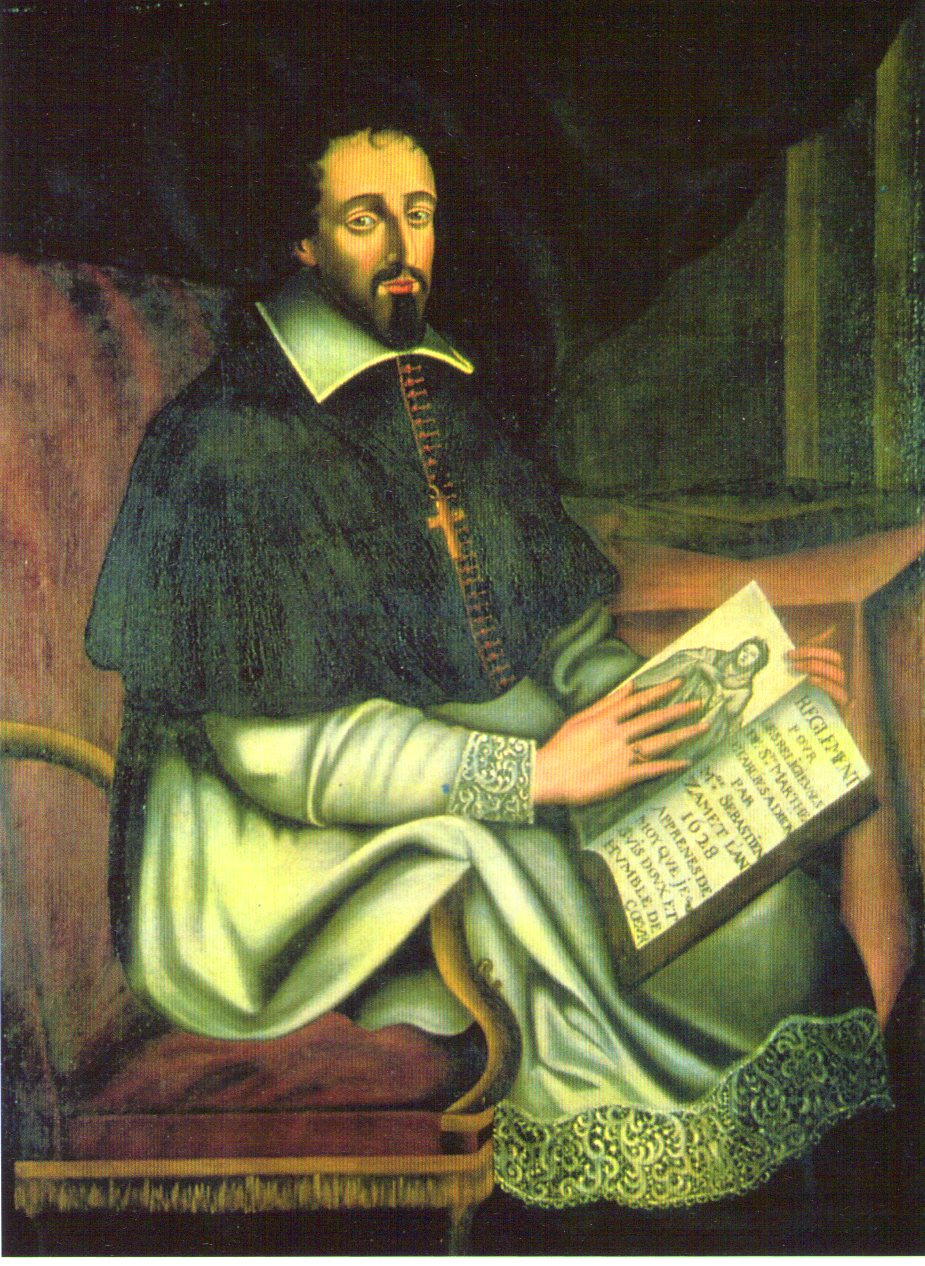
- Sébastien Zamet (painting by Jean Tassel)
- Church: Catholic Church
- Diocese: Diocese of Langres
- In office: 6 April 1615 – 2 February 1655
- Predecessor: Charles de Pérusse des Cars
- Successor: Louis Barbier

Orders
- Consecration: 18 June 1615 by Jacques Davy Duperron

Personal details
- Born: 1588 Paris, Kingdom of France
- Died: 2 February 1655 (aged 66–67) Mussy-sur-Seine, Champagne, Kingdom of France

Sébastien Zamet (1588 in Paris – 2 February 1655 in Mussy-sur-Seine) was a French Roman Catholic bishop, monastery reformer and early actor in the Jansenism dispute. He was the bishop of Langres.

== Works ==
- Lettres spirituelles de Sébastien Zamet, évêque-duc de Langres, pair de France. Published by Louis-Nicolas Prunel. A. Picard, Paris 1911–1912.

== Literature ==
- Louis Narcisse Prunel (1874–1932): Sébastien Zamet, évêque-duc de Langres, pair de France, 1588-1655. Sa vie et ses œuvres. Les origines du jansénisme. A. Picard, Paris 1912, online.
- Paul Broutin: La réforme pastorale en France au XVIIe siècle. Recherches sur la tradition pastorale après le Concile de Trente. Bd. 1. Desclée, Paris 1956, p. 119–136.
