= Victor-Marie d'Estrées =

French military officer and politician

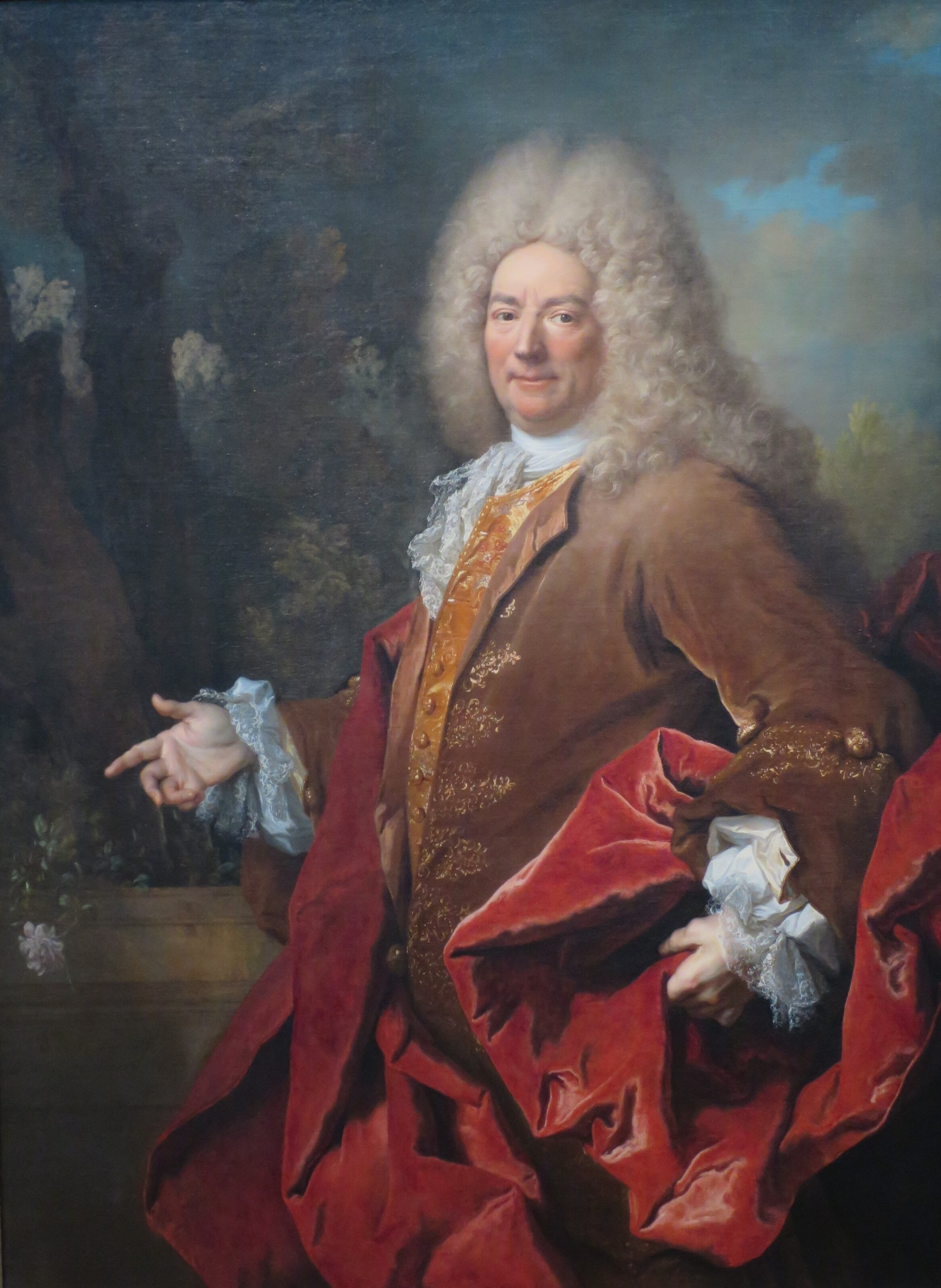
- Portrait by Nicolas de Largillière, 1710
- Born: 30 November 1660; Hôtel d'Estrées, Paris, France
- Died: 27 December 1737 (aged 77) Hôtel d'Estrées, Paris, France
- Allegiance: France
- Branch: French Royal Army; French Navy
- Service years: 1676–1731
- Rank: Vice admiral (French Navy)
- Commands: Ponant Fleet
- Conflicts: Franco-Dutch War; Action of March 1677; Nine Years' War; Battle of Beachy Head (1690); Raid on Teignmouth; War of the Spanish Succession; Battle of Málaga (1704)
- Awards: Order of the Holy Spirit; Order of the Golden Fleece
- Spouse: Lucie Félicité de Noailles

Vice-Admiral Victor Marie d'Estrées, 5th Duke of Estrées (30 November 1660 – 27 December 1737) was a French military officer and politician. Born in Paris, he was made a Marshal of France and was subsequently known as the "Maréchal d'Estrées".

== Biography ==
The son of Jean II d'Estrées, Victor-Marie d'Estrées began his military career in the French Royal Army in 1676, but joined the French Navy in the next year. During the Franco-Dutch War, he commanded a warship in the action of March 1677 and fought afterwards in the Mediterranean. At the beginning of the Nine Years' War, he volunteered to again serve in the army and was wounded in the siege of Philippsburg in 1688. In 1690, he commanded 20 ships in the Battle of Beachy Head and led the controversial raid on Teignmouth a few days later. Then, on command of King Louis XIV, he took charge of the Mediterranean fleet and supported Louis Joseph, Duke of Vendôme in the capture of Barcelona in 1697.

In 1698, he married Lucie Félicité de Noailles, the daughter of Anne Jules de Noailles. They had no children. At the beginning of the War of Spanish Succession, he was ordered to sail Philip V of Spain to Naples to claim the throne of the Two Sicilies. The success of this mission earned him the title of Grandee of Spain. He received the title of Marshal of France in 1703, and commander in the Order of the Holy Spirit in 1705. In 1704, Estrées was appointed mentor to the Count of Toulouse, illegitimate son of Louis XIV and admiral of France. Together they fought the tactically indecisive Battle of Vélez-Málaga (24 August 1704).

During the Regency of Philippe II, Duke of Orléans, he was made member of the council, but d'Estrées had no political skills. After the death of his father, he inherited the title of Viceroy of the American Islands and received the French colony of Saint Lucia as his private property. He gathered an enormous fortune, which d'Estrées spent on buying art and books, accumulating it in his Paris house and castles, never unpacking a large proportion of the collection. He was elected member of the Académie française in 1715. He became Duke of Estrées and Peer of France in 1723, after the death of his uncle. He died in 1737.

The French cruiser D'Estrées and D'Estrees Bay in South Australia was named in his honour.

== Marriage ==
In 1698, he married Lucie Félicité de Noailles (a daughter of The Duke of Noailles) but had no children.
