= Château de la Bourdaisière =

19th-century county house in France

Coordinates: 47°22′12″N 0°50′19″E

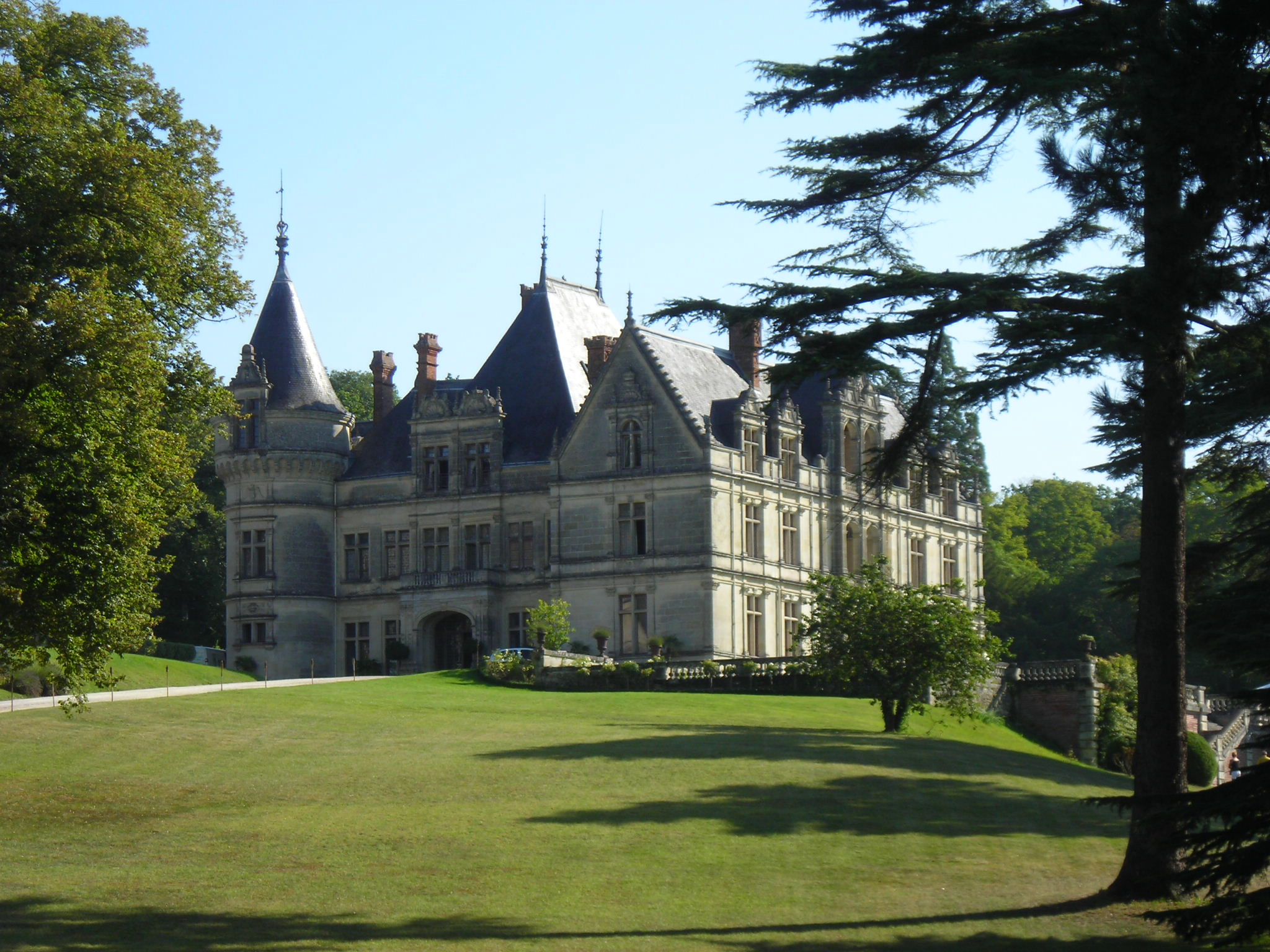
Château de la Bourdaisière

The Château de la Bourdaisière (French pronunciation: [ʃato də la buʁdɛzjɛʁ]) is a 19th-century county house in the Commune of Montlouis-sur-Loire, in the Indre-et-Loire département of France.

The site of the present house dates back to the 14th century when it was a fortress belonging to Jean Meingr. Over the next few generations, the property changed hands several times, until 1520 when King Francis I arranged for construction of a new castle on the site. Built for his mistress, Marie Gaudin, the wife of Philibert Babou, Superintendent of Finances for France, after her death, the property would remain in the family's hands.

Marie Gaudin's granddaughter, Gabrielle d'Estrées, was born in the château and would herself grow up to become mistress to another king, Henry IV of France.

In 1775, the château was partially destroyed by order of King Louis XV's most powerful Minister, Étienne François, Duc de Choiseul. Étienne François wanted to use the stones from Château de la Bourdaisière for the construction of his Pagoda at his estate in Chanteloup, near Amboise.

Lying in ruins, in 1786 the land was sold to Louise Adélaïde of Penthièvre Bourbon. In 1802 the property was acquired by Baron Joseph Angelier who undertook a massive reconstruction of Château Bourdaisière. The interior work would be completed by his son, Gustave Angelier. Although a small château, when compared to the great châteaux of the Kings and some of those built by other wealthy nobles, it is a magnificent Renaissance construction fronted by traditional French gardens.

The Castle was sold in 1923 to a wealthy American, Mrs. de Mérinville, who sold it in 1938. During World War II, the château was occupied by the Nazis. After the war, a lack of funds by its owner saw it become severely run down. In 1959, its contents were auctioned off and government turned the château into a home for the elderly.

It was sold again in 1988 to an attorney, François Michaud, who owned it until 1991 when it was acquired by its current owners, the Princes of Broglie who undertook significant improvements and modernization. In 2003, Château de la Bourdaisière gained considerable attention in North America, as the primary site for the television show Joe Millionaire. In 2011, the chateaus gardens were finalist for the European Garden Award bestowed by the European Garden Heritage Network.

The château was listed as a monument historique in 1947.
