= Henri-Charles de Beaumanoir of Lavardin =

French soldier and Ambassador

Henri-Charles de Beaumanoir
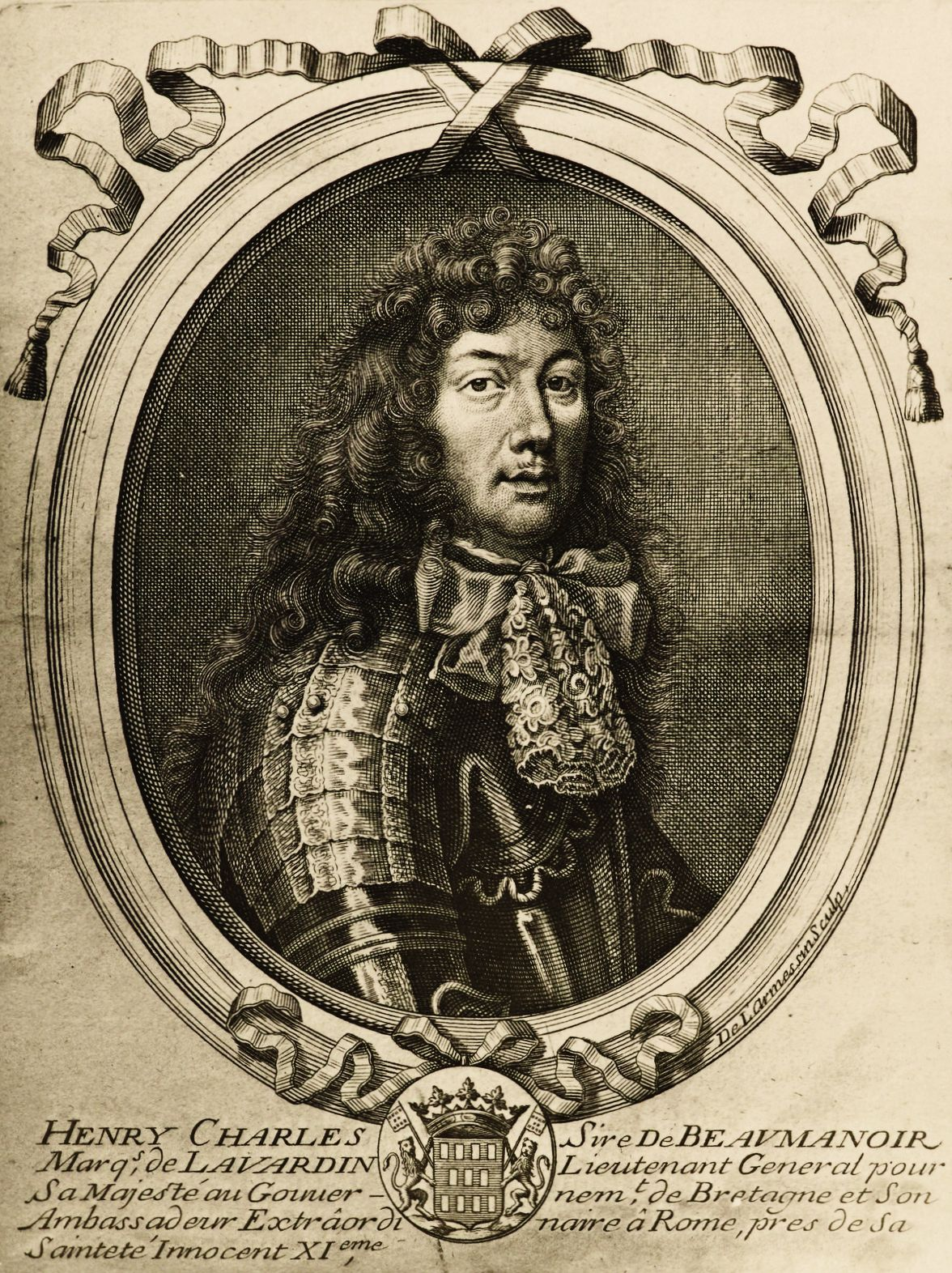
- Born: 15 March 1644; Le Mans
- Died: 29 August 1701 (aged 57); Paris
- Resting place: Saint-Julien Cathedral in Le Mans
- Occupations: King's officer; ambassador
- Title: Lieutenant General in Upper and Lower Brittany; French Ambassador to the Holy See
- Awards: Knight of the Order of the Holy Spirit (1688)

Henri-Charles de Beaumanoir, Marquis of Lavardin, (15 March 1644 – 29 August 1701) was a French soldier and Ambassador. Appointed Lieutenant general of Brittany in 1670 by Louis XIV, he faced the revolt of the Papier timbré in 1675. At the beginning of the troubles, he tried to restore order while delaying the entry of royal troops into the province, but he had to step aside as the situation deteriorated.

In 1687, in a context of intense diplomatic tensions between France and the Papacy, he was appointed extraordinary ambassador to Rome and was charged by the Sun King to oppose the withdrawal of the ambassadors' franchises by Pope Innocent XI. He then occupied the Farnese palace with several hundred men in arms and was excommunicated by the Pope. He was recalled at the beginning of 1689, shortly before the death of Innocent XI, because of the policy of appeasement practiced by Louis XIV.

Back in Brittany, the Marquis of Lavardin saw his functions as an officer of the king reduced by the rise of royal absolutism, but remained a leading figure in the province; he devoted the last years of his life to ensuring the recognition of the rights of the Admiralty of Brittany, threatened by the Admiral of France.

== Biography ==
=== Family ===
Henri-Charles de Beaumanoir was born on 15 March 1644 in Le Mans, into a powerful family of the Maine nobility: the Beaumanoirs of Lavardin. He was the descendant of Jean de Beaumanoir, the first marquis of Lavardin – from 1601 – and made marshal of France by Henri IV. His father, Henri II de Beaumanoir, marshal of the king's camps and armies, was killed in 1644 (Note: The source gives 1641, but as the siege of Gravelines and the birth of Henri-Charles both took place in 1644, the correction is necessary. This date is corroborated by his funeral inscription.) at the siege of Gravelines; his uncle, Philibert-Emmanuel de Beaumanoir, was bishop of Le Mans; finally, his mother, Marguerite-Renée de Rostaing – daughter of the marquis Charles de Rostaing -, was a close friend of Marie de Rabutin-Chantal, marquise of Sévigné

On 3 February 1667, Henri-Charles de Beaumanoir married Françoise de Luynes, daughter of Louis-Charles d'Albert de Luynes. His wife having died in 1670, he married Louise Anne de Noailles, daughter of Duke Anne de Noailles and sister of Cardinal de Noailles, on June 1, 1680. From his first marriage, he had an only daughter, Anne-Charlotte, who married Louis de La Châtre. From his second marriage he had a son, Henri, who was killed in 1703 at the battle of Speyerbach. This death marked the extinction of the male line of Beaumanoir of Lavardin, whose property and titles passed to René de Froulay de Tessé.

=== General Lieutenancy of Brittany ===
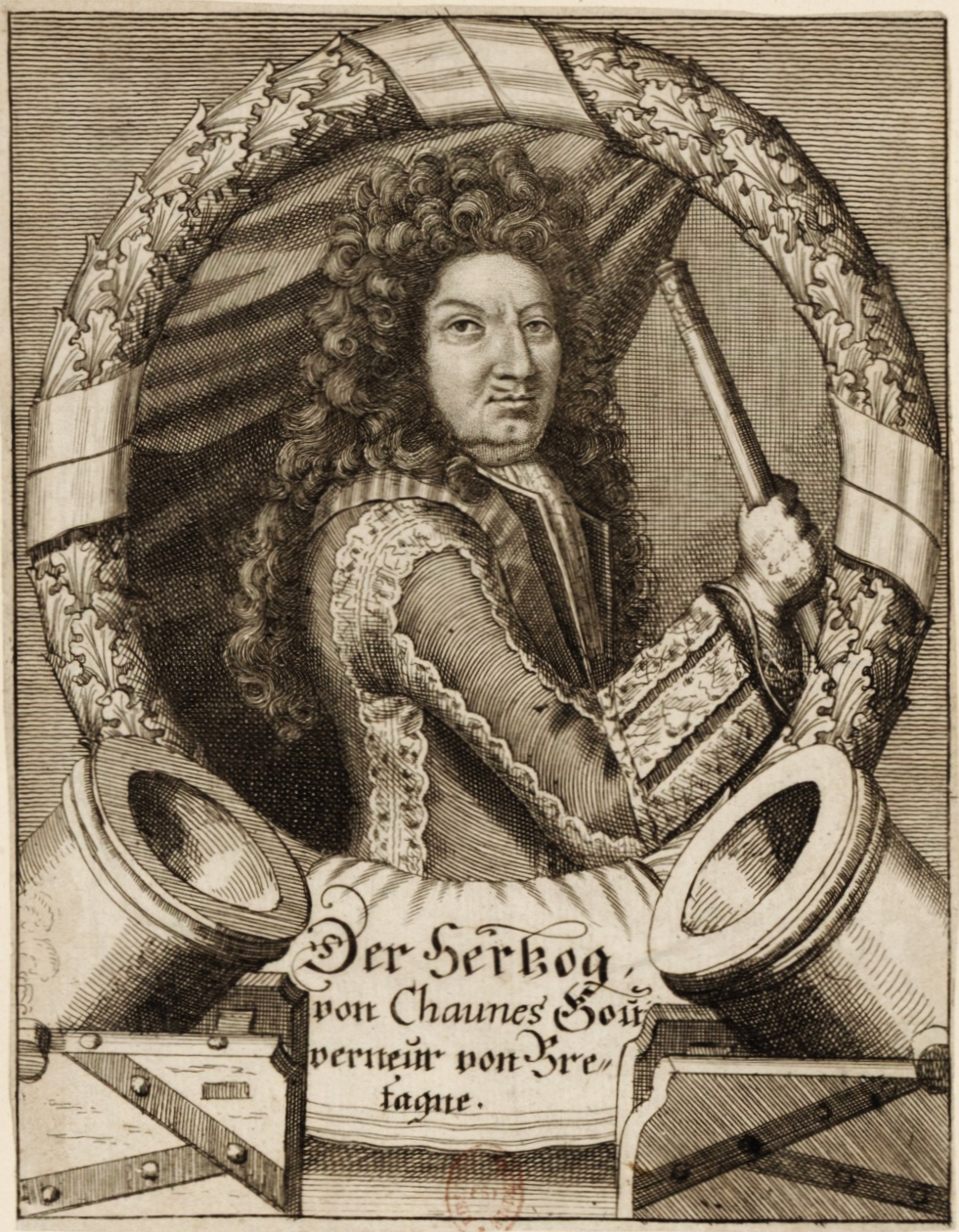
Charles d'Albert d'Ailly, Duke of Chaulnes, Governor of Brittany from 1670 to 1695.

In 1670, the Marquis of Lavardin was appointed Lieutenant general of Brittany. Since the 16th century, the governor of the province had been assisted by two lieutenant-generals, one for the county of Nantes and the other for Lower and Upper Brittany. (Note: These designations refer to the historical regions of the province of Brittany and not to the Breton linguistic border which is currently in use.) The Marquis of Lavardin was given the latter office and was therefore responsible for eight of the nine bishoprics of Brittany. His task was to replace the governor during his absences – a relatively common event – and to assist him in the administration of the province, particularly in military matters. The Marquis of Lavardin was himself assisted by two king's lieutenants, one for Lower Brittany and one for Upper Brittany. He succeeded the marshal de La Porte, who died in 1664, and his son, who retired to his estates in 1669. In the same year, the post of governor was filled after having been vacant since 1666: Charles d'Albert d'Ailly, Duke of Chaulnes, was the new holder. The third king's officer for the province was the Marquis de Rosmadec of Molac, lieutenant general for the bishopric of Nantes

The Duke of Chaulnes, by virtue of his functions, exercised the powers attached to the Admiralty of Brittany – distinct from the Admiralty of France -, endeavoured to extend them and behaved as a true Admiral of Brittany; when he acted in his absence, the Marquis of Lavardin enjoyed his prerogatives. In September 1669, even before he took up his official duties, the Duke of Chaulnes had regulated the enrolment of Breton sailors, and, at his request, the States of Brittany had created a commission to proceed with a naval armament of the coasts of Saint-Malo. In 1672, he fixed the salaries and vacations of the officers of the maritime jurisdiction and published an ordinance instituting a system of passports that the captains of the navy had to obtain from him. He then assumed responsibility for the maritime police and coastal security. The Marquis of Lavardin also took measures concerning the navy, even if they were less far-reaching; among the most important were: on November 20, 1674, the prohibition of seneschals, judges and officers from issuing pilot's letters – a navigation permit – on their own initiative; on November 8, 1677, the decree of an embargo on barley leaving the ports of Brittany; on July 16 and October 24, 1686, two ordinances regulating the repair of the guards' offices in the seven coastal bishoprics.

Mrs. de Sevigne was at that time a good friend of the Marquis of Lavardin, of whom she wrote in one of her letters to her daughter: (Note: And more precisely in his letter 145 written at Les Rochers, on 16 October 1675 .) "He is the least low and cowardly courtier I have ever seen". Nevertheless, she stressed to her correspondent that she did not condone his humor or his lack of manners.

=== Revolts of the Papier Timbré ===
Between March and September 1675, the West of France experienced a series of uprisings linked to an increase in taxes, including that of stamped paper, required for authentic acts. Emotions were particularly high in Brittany, first in the towns, then in the countryside of Lower Brittany.

==== Riots in Rennes ====
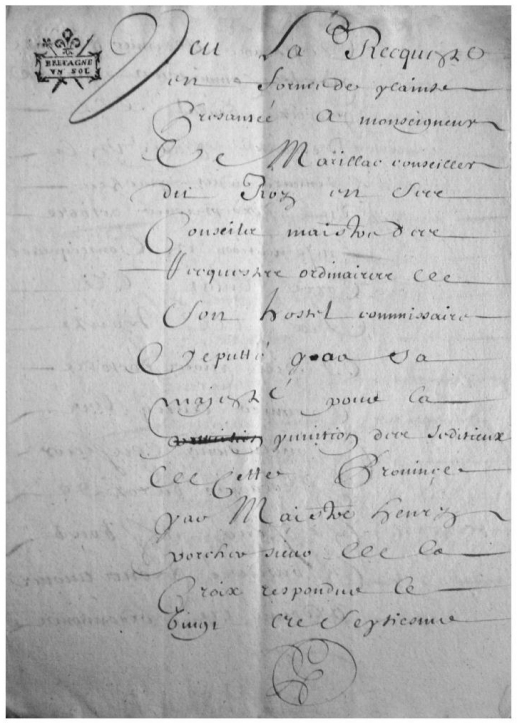
Request on stamped paper made in Brittany in 1675.

At the beginning of April 1675, an antifiscal revolt broke out in Rennes; it was triggered by mimicry of similar events that had occurred in March in Bordeaux. On April 3, the first disturbances took place; on April 18, a great riot ransacked the tobacco and stamped paper offices and the repression of the popular emotion was carried out firmly by the son of the Marquis of Coëtlogon, governor of the city. On April 25, the crowd attacked and burned the Huguenot temple, because of the supposed religion of the local tax collectors; among the rioters were many schoolchildren. The irruption of Coëtlogon junior's cavalrymen, too late, did not prevent the attack and only two factious men were seized by the authorities. The crowd also attacked the prison, but Coëtlogon managed to rally the bourgeois militia to prevent access.

The Marquis of Lavardin entered Rennes in the meantime; after having taken the measure of events, he protested against the inaction of justice and gave formal notice to the parliament of Rennes to open proceedings against the two prisoners. Indeed, he considered that the rioters of April 25 were the same as those of April 18, with the notorious exception of the students, and that authority should therefore be shown. However, he refused indiscriminate repression and announced that his role was to "calm the disorder, appease the spirits, restore peace and tranquillity". One of the accused, a schoolboy, was released very quickly – he was only 14 years old – while the other, a baker, was kept in custody. On May 3, the arrival of the Duke of Chaulnes intensified the legal proceedings, as he was the bearer of orders from the king calling for the greatest severity against the rioters of April 18; three men injured during the disturbances were seized at Saint-Yves hospital.

Lavardin's analysis of the events in Rennes – together with other representatives of the nobility of Brittany – is that the Parliament, and more generally the men of law and the Nobility of the Robe, had adopted an approving passivity towards the city riots, because the Parliament viewed the rollback of the royal innovations in taxation with favour. This accusation was to be a major factor in the royal decision to exile the parliament of Brittany from Rennes. Lavardin's position is shared by a whole section of historiography - notably Claude Nières, Yvon Garlan, James B. Collins and John Hurt – but is rejected by Gauthier Aubert, who believes that the restraint of the parliamentarians is related to the lack of means to maintain order, and that the accusation against them is a means of exonerating the governor of the province and his deputies.

==== Takeover of Nantes ====
On May 9, the king, by letters patent, revoked Sébastien de Rosmadec, governor of Nantes and lieutenant-general of the ninth bishopric of Brittany. On May 20, the Parlement of Rennes confirmed this recall and his replacement by the Marquis of Lavardin, described on the occasion as "experienced and capable". This relatively obscure disgrace – the Marquis of Molac had taken similar measures against the local rioters as the Coëtlogon in Rennes – can be explained by the fact that, unlike Lavardin, Molac did not oppose the slow judicial punishment of the Nantes factionalists; his inability to prevent the sequestration of Archbishop de La Vallière during the troubles may also have contributed to his replacement. Louis XIV, convinced of the extreme seriousness of the Breton revolt, took strong measures: on May 8, he asked for 600 men of the royal maréchaussée to be sent to Brittany; on the same day, Louvois promised Chaulnes a regiment of the Crown, i.e. 800 men, which would bring the number of troops stationed in the province to some 1,500, a not inconsiderable number given that France was in the midst of the Dutch war. The Duke of Chaulnes and the Marquis of Lavardin then began a tight game: On the one hand, by demonstrating the threat of intervention by royal troops, they sought to bring the towns and notables back to obedience, and on the other hand, they hoped that a rapid return to calm would make it possible to avoid – or at least shorten – the entry of the royals into Brittany, in order to protect the province from the complications that would result from it – accommodation for the soldiers, subsistence costs for the troops, exactions by the soldiery, etc.

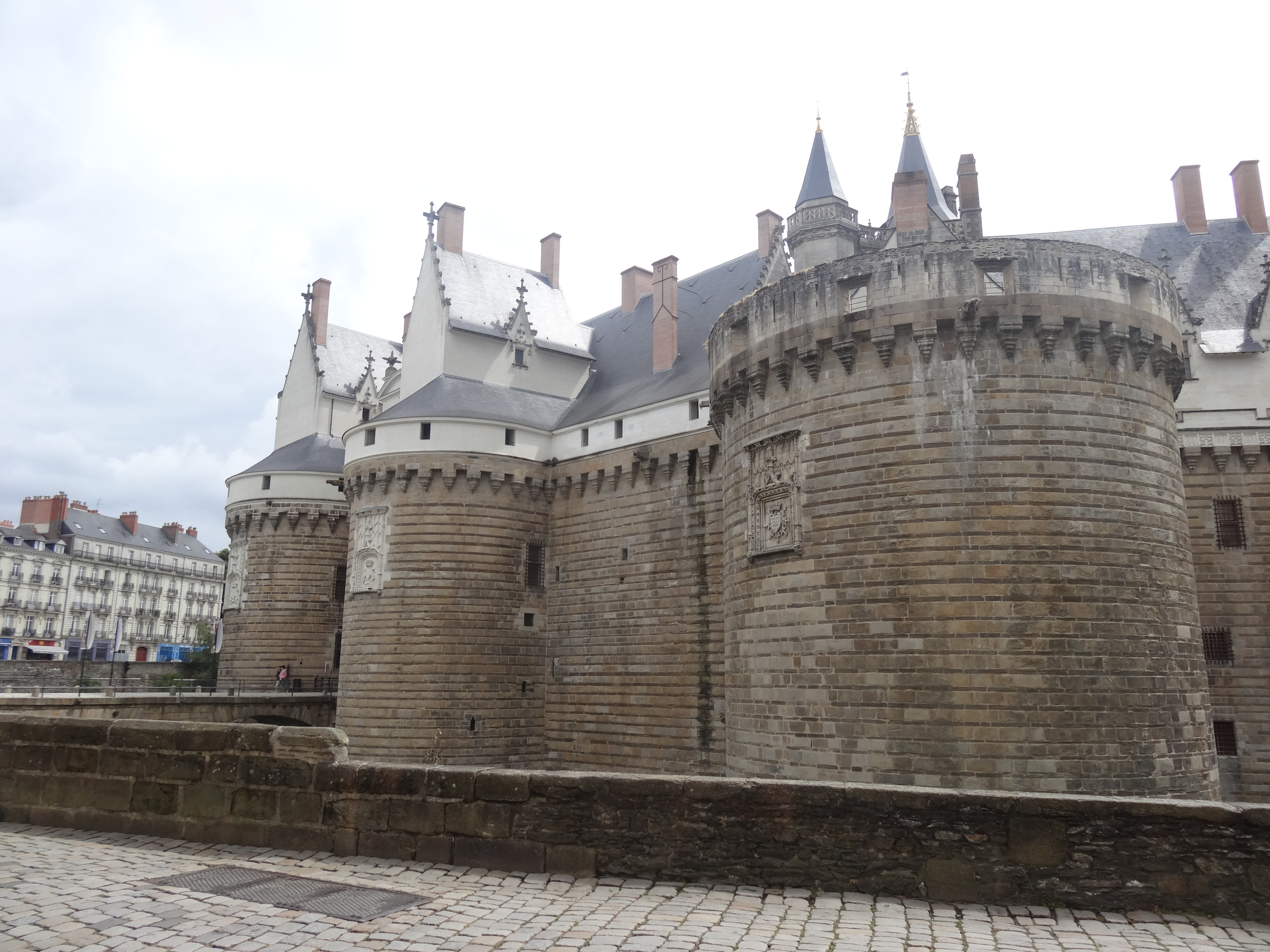
The castle of Nantes, headquarters of the Duke of Chaulnes' takeover of the city.

On May 21, Chaulnes and Lavardin left Rennes for Nantes, where the king's troops were to enter Brittany, to precede them. On the spot, where they took command of the 150 men-at-arms assembled by Molac, both showed frenetic activity, with the governor of Brittany playing the leading role. Indeed, his presence – whereas that of the marquis would have been sufficient – seems to testify to a desire to clean up the situation as quickly as possible, as the royal disgrace was threatening. The numerous letters that Lavardin sent to Colbert, Seignelay and Louvois highlight the voluntarism of the local authorities and underline the recovery of control by the Duke of Chaulnes; these documents have been used extensively to study the stamped paper revolt, and in particular the situation in Nantes. On Chaulnes' request, the commander of the cavalry of maréchaussée made them turn back; however, Lord Ervé, at the head of the detachment of the Crown regiment, ignored the duke's warnings and continued his march on Nantes. As for the repressive measures taken by the king's officers, they were relatively successful; thus, of the five most involved "seditionists" that Chaulnes ordered to be arrested, only one of them, Goulven Saläun – who had distinguished himself by climbing the Bouffay belfry – was hanged on May 27 after a questioning and a two-day trial, the others having fled. This punishment was meted out to a lower Brittany without any ties to the country, which made the execution acceptable to the people of Nantes. Pursuing the recovery, Chaulnes and Lavardin urged the courts to start proceedings against other factious people who had been identified; on May 30, a banishment order was issued against one of the fugitives, Michèle Roux – known as l'Éveillone -, whose family Lavardin announced would be "chased away so that there is no hope of her returning" – a measure that was not finally applied. On the other hand, public order, which had been damaged by the revolt, was restored: on 26 May, the tobacco and tin office was re-established; on 1 June, the Marquis de Lavardin reported that the control of stamped paper was going well; Louvois was informed that calm reigned in Nantes. Also, the same day, the governor of Brittany left Nantes, leaving Lavardin in charge.

The efforts of the Duke and the Marquis to keep the troops out of Nantes were given an additional interpretation by a contemporary, the Commissaire des Guerres Joinville. Joinville insinuated that the two officers of the king had been bribed by the mayor Jean Régnier and the town's notables to prevent the arrival of the troops; the mayor also hoped to save his position, which was compromised by the town's insubordination. Later, once the arrival of the troops was inevitable, the plan was to have the treasurer of the extraordinary war office pay the costs of billeting, while part of the sum initially planned would have been allocated to the two governors. Lavardin and Chaulnes having had all the correspondence from Nantes opened, the discovery that the secret had been leaked made them abandon their plan.

==== End of the unrest ====
As the only master of the town, the lieutenant-general continued to try to show severity; at the beginning of June, he obtained the departure of some inhabitants against whom the evidence was insufficient to justify a conviction; one of the prisoners died of his wounds, which allowed the marquis to claim that justice was being done. Despite Lavardin's efforts, the manoeuvre fell through: the efforts of the Breton authorities did not prevent the arrival of the royal troops in Nantes (Note: Of which the maréchaussée, having retraced its steps at the behest of Le Tellier) on June 3. The Marquis took command of the sixteen companies, had them put in battle order on the Motte Saint-Pierre, then entered the city with them. It seems that the people of Nantes did not hesitate to oppose it by force; the financing of the stay of the troops by the treasurer of the wars – with the exception of meals taken at the inhabitant's – seems to have calmed the situation. The occupation of the town was complete: Lavardin had eleven companies stationed in the town, two in the castle and three in the suburbs. Régnier, disowned by the Lord of Beaumanoir, lost the municipal election to Louis Charette. (Note: In this regard, Joinville was not afraid to accuse Lavardin of having allowed the troops to enter Nantes and of having withdrawn his support for Régnier to dispel suspicions about his honesty) The presence of the troops was in itself a punishment, but they also helped in the execution of the last court decisions. Thus, on 22 June, following a quick trial, a prisoner was put in the pillory and condemned to banishment. On the same day, the king's men left Nantes for Le Mans, another rebel town.

Coat of arms of the Beaumanoir family.

The decision, taken by Chaulnes, aimed to keep the soldiers away from the territory of the government of Brittany as much as to anticipate the orders of Louis XIV. The governor of Brittany nevertheless reinforced the city's garrison by sending a hundred men-at-arms. Henri-Charles de Beaumanoir, still the master of the game in Nantes, watched with displeasure as the soldiers moved eastwards where he owned his lands of Lavardin, and which he feared would be ravaged by the repression. On June 29, the feast of Saint Peter, Lavardin, wishing to confirm his return to control of the city, had guards in his livery placed in the choir of the cathedral, which caused unrest in the population, as this was an unprecedented event – it was a royal privilege. The canons refused to sing and the faithful did not respond to the bishop's Gloria; so Bishop de la Vallière decided to hold a Low Mass instead of the planned religious ceremony. This incident was the last sign of sedition in Nantes, which was to experience no further unrest during the rest of the Breton revolt.

At the end of June, the countryside of Lower Brittany was set ablaze by the revolt known as the "Bonnets Rouges", but Lavardin was still posted to Nantes. Desperate to receive a command from the king to quell the uprising, he languished in his government in Nantes and tried to show his voluntarism in the letters he sent to the court. Nevertheless, the ministers left him confined to the banks of the Loire, with the bulk of the work of restoring order devolved to the Duke of Chaulnes. From Nantes, Lavardin analysed the peasant rebellion as a reaction to lordly injustices rather than an anti-fiscal sentiment. Against these rural Bretoners, he advocated repression rather than the conciliation he had preached in Nantes and Rennes. Thus, he wrote in one of his letters – in which he once again sought to keep the royals out of the towns of Brittany -: "Perhaps this regiment and these marshals will be more necessary in Lower Brittany; it is a rough and fierce country and produces inhabitants who are like it. They have a poor understanding of French and hardly any understanding of logic".

=== Embassy in Rome ===
==== Diplomatic context ====
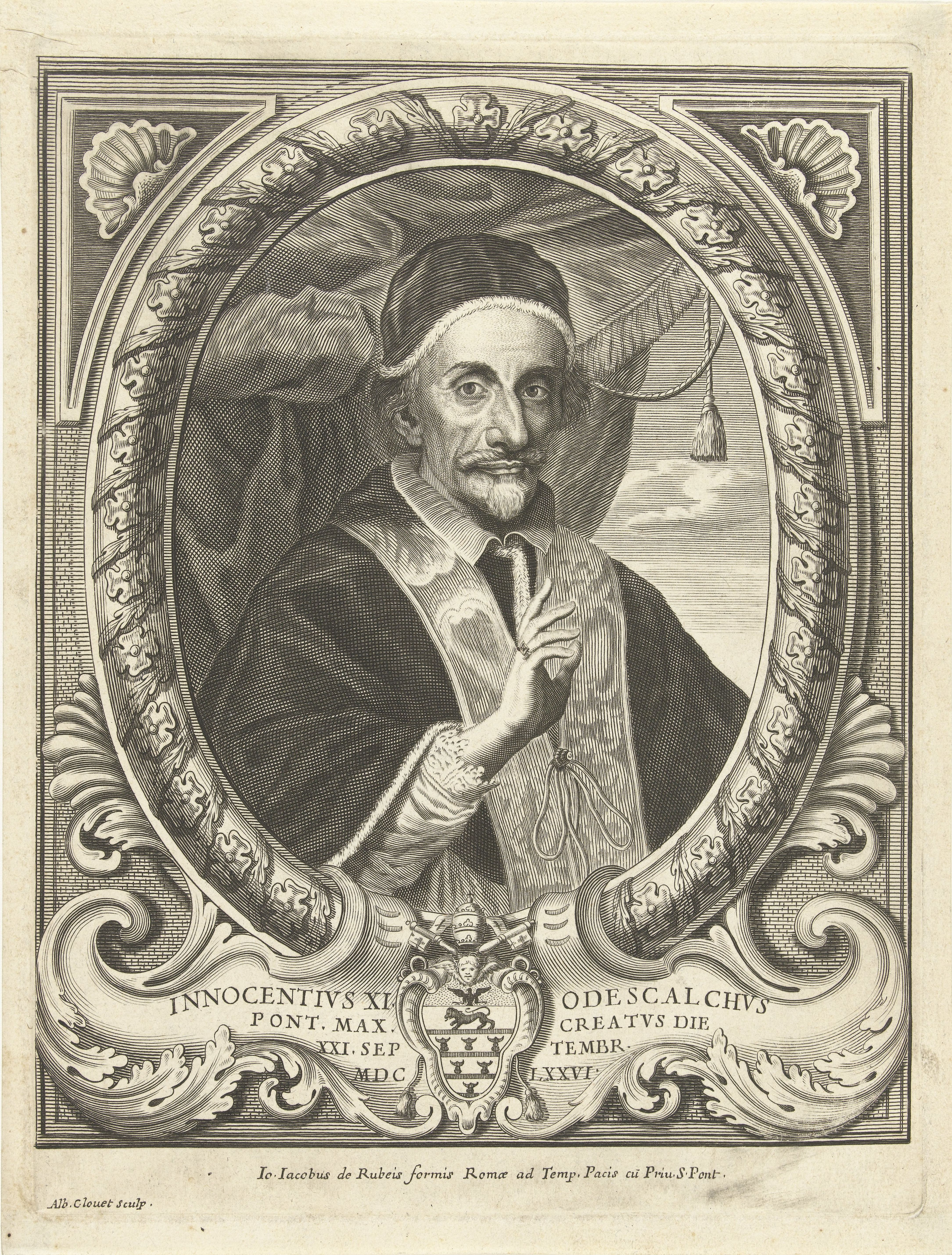
Pope Innocent XI in the 1670s.

Since the accession of Pope Innocent XI in 1676, relations between France and the Holy See have been extremely tense. Indeed, the regal affair prevented concord between Louis XIV and the Pope for a long time. This poisoning of diplomatic relations worsened after the French clergy assembly of 1682, during which the French Catholic hierarchy sided with the Gallican monarch on the issue of the right of regal. From then on, Innocent XI refused to appoint the rebellious clergymen – i.e. signatories of the Four Articles of the assembly – presented by the King of France to the episcopal dignity. In the absence of papal bulls, the number of vacant diocesan sees increased.

In addition to this conflict of usury, the Pope sought to conclude the Franchise Dispute to his advantage. At that time, franchises were rights held in Rome by the ambassadors of certain European powers, which allowed them to exempt the area surrounding their residence from Roman jurisdiction in matters of customs and justice.
In 1679, the Pontiff warned the French court that, as long as François Annibal II d'Estrées was ambassador, France's franchises would be respected, but that the new holder could only take up his duties on condition that he renounced them. On the death of the Duke of Estrées, on 30 January 1687, the Pope ordered his sbirri – the papal police – to take possession of the French neighborhood. Moreover, the Pope formally opposed the nomination of the Cardinal of Estrées to succeed his brother as French ambassador; indeed, he was convinced that César d'Estrées would use the cardinal's purple to refuse the abolition of his exemptions.
Frustrated in his choice, Louis XIV then set his sights on the Marquis of Lavardin and charged him with supporting the franchises of France. On May 16, 1687, Innocent XI issued a bull to definitively prohibit the franchises of ambassadors in Rome, under penalty of the most terrible ecclesiastical censure: major excommunication. Henri-Charles de Beaumanoir read it before his trip. The Pope obtained the submission - often grudgingly - of the other European courts, but Louis XIV retorted to the nuncio "that God had established him to serve as an example and rule to others, and not to imitate them"; nevertheless, Lavardin's departure was suspended and used to assemble a military escort to keep the Papal forces at bay.

==== Conflict with Pope Innocent XI ====
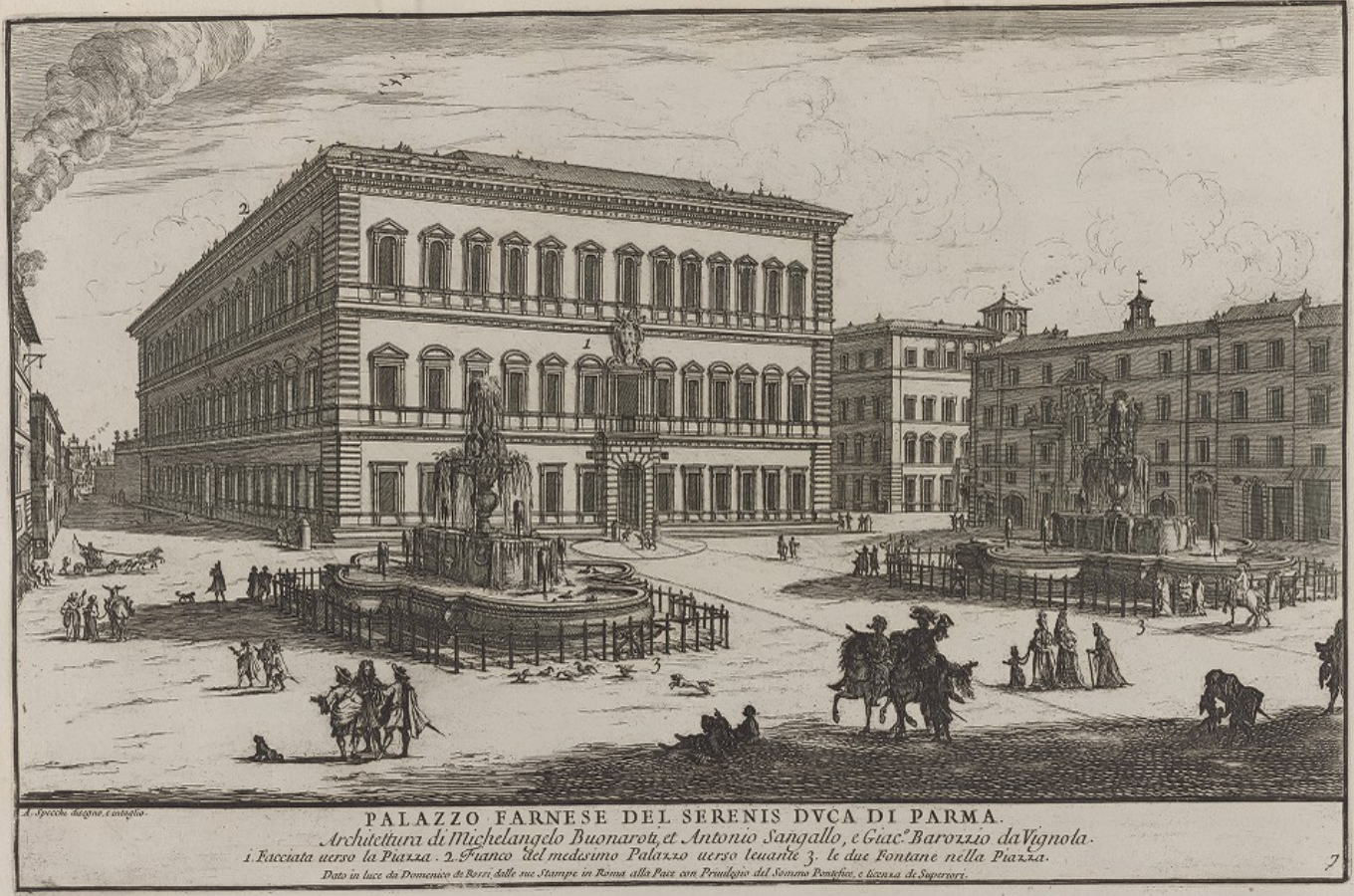
The Farnese Palace and the eponymous square in 1699, engraving by Alessandro Specchi.

On November 14, 1687, the Marquis of Lavardin presented himself before Rome, accompanied by a troop of 100 armed men, hand-picked and mostly naval officers. His agents informed him that he would not be denied access by force. On November 16, the Pope was unable to oppose his entry into the city and had him open the Porte du Peuple. The arrival of the Marquis of Lavardin was marked by great pomp and circumstance, with his soldiers marching in with weapons in hand; the officers of the papal customs were dissuaded by his escort from infringing on the ambassador's rights. In addition to the goods he brought with him, Louis XIV's envoy brought 300 muskets into the city to arm the French residents of Rome, should the need arise. Lavardin and his troop moved into the Farnese Palace and retreated to the French quarter, which took on the appearance of a military camp. He had the palace decorated with the king's coat of arms and the Lavardin coat of arms, unequivocally signifying his status as French ambassador. He immediately requested an audience with the Pope, but the latter stubbornly refused to grant it. In retaliation, Louis XIV stopped meeting the Apostolic Nuncio to France, Cardinal Ranuzzi.

The first measures taken by Lavardin were successful: the sbirri were kept away, a hundred criminals were chased away from the vicinity of the Piazza Farnese, the crossing points in the district were carefully controlled to avoid abuses, and the ambassador's soldiers behaved impeccably with the population. A column of Ottoman prisoners had to be diverted to avoid the area around the Farnese Palace, lest the Turks' chains be broken by the French. The Lord of Beaumanoir's enterprise was judged with complacency by Christina of Sweden and the Spanish ambassador, the latter wishing for its success to regain possession of their ancient franchises. On December 8, Louis XIV wrote to his ambassador to congratulate him and recommend extreme prudence. On December 13, the Marquis informed the chapter of the Basilica of St John Lateran that he intended to attend the service in memory of Henry IV and to receive the honours due to a French ambassador. Innocent XI then had the ceremony postponed sine die, signifying to everyone the excommunication he was carrying against the Marquis of Lavardin. On Christmas night 1687, the Marquis of Lavardin, unaffected, attended mass in the church of Saint-Louis-des-Français. The Pope, scandalised that the French ambassador had been allowed to take communion, then imposed a ban on the French national church in Rome. This ban lasted from January to March 1688. (Note: The source gives 1687; this is obviously a typo.) On December 27, 1687, Lavardin published a Protest in which he asserted that as ambassador of "His Most Christian Majesty" he was "exempt from all ecclesiastical censures, as long as he is clothed in this character and carries out the orders of the King his master", a long-standing Gallican claim.

==== Worsening of the situation ====
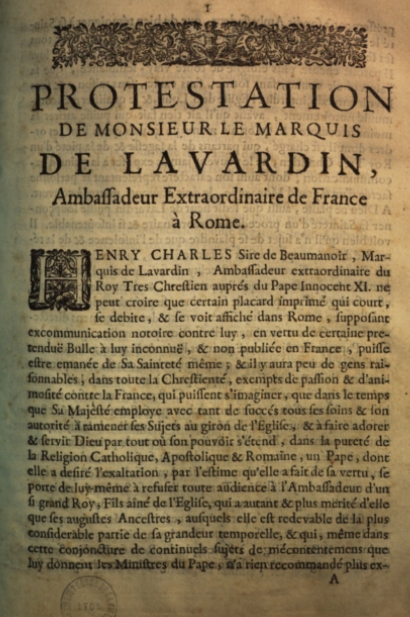
First page of the Protestation de Monsieur le marquis de Lavardin, distributed on 27 December 1687 and subsequently published in 1688.

On January 23, 1688, the Parlement of Paris rendered a decision in which it declared the papal bull on the franchises and the excommunication of the Marquis of Lavardin null and void. In addition, it ratified the appeal to a future council to judge the Pope's conduct. In February, on the advice of Colbert of Croissy, Henri-Charles de Beaumanoir had the heads of his escort – the captains of Charlard and Sartous – post the Parliament's ruling all over Rome: on the doors of the Chancellery Palace, Saint Louis, Saint Peter's Basilica, the Palace of Monte Cavallo, Santa Maria Rotonda, etc. From March 1688 onwards, King James II of England mediated between the Holy See and France through his envoy, Lord Howard, but the two powers stuck to their positions: while France planned to ease the pressure maintained by Lavardin in the event of a papal concession, Innocent XI refused to give in on the question of the Quarters. The situation worsened further in August 1688 when the Pope refused to confirm Cardinal of Fürstenberg – France's candidate – to the electorate of Cologne, and appeared to be siding with the League of Augsburg in the European struggle against the monarchy of Louis XIV. The news enraged the king, especially as on August 2, 1688, the Marquis of Chamlay, his agent sent to Rome to unofficially re-establish diplomatic ties, was turned away at the pontiff's door. As a retaliatory measure, Louis XIV decided to prevent Cardinal Ranuzzi from leaving Paris.

The situation in the streets of Rome also contributed to making the two sovereigns irreconcilable: after Lavardin's soldiers had beaten up some sbirri in June 1688, the Roman justice system condemned them to death in absentia and put a price on their heads. In September 1688, after two of the marquis's men were captured by the papal police, Colbert de Croissy had members of Cardinal Ranuzzi's retinue seized in order to "subject them to the same treatment as those of Mr de Lavardin in Rome". Cardinal Casoni, secretary of the cipher and eminence grise of Innocent XI, supported the Pope in his resistance to the wishes of the French court. Well aware of the prelate's influence, the Marquis de Lavardin had his agents spy on him and planned to kidnap him in the street, but he was not executed. In August 1688, Louis XIV sent 100 additional officers and naval guards to reinforce the Lavardin garrison in Rome. On September 6, 1688, the king instructed Cardinal d'Estrées to threaten the Holy See with the possibility of an intervention in Avignon. On September 13, 1688, faced with the intransigence of Innocent XI, he ordered the invasion of Avignon and the Comtat Venaissin by French troops; preparations for a landing at Civitavecchia became more precise. In October 1688, the king assigned the nuncio a zealous supervisor in the person of one of his gentlemen, Mr of Saint-Olon. In November 1688, England's intercession made progress, partly due to a change of heart on the part of Cardinal Casoni, who feared the threat to his life posed by Lavardin's men; however, the overthrow of James II and his exile in France helped to make English mediation a tool in the hands of the French court. The French demand that Lavardin be granted an audience with the Pope, which was made a precondition for any compromise, was rejected by Innocent XI.

In November 1688, the Marquis of Lavardin sent his wife and daughter – from his first marriage – to Siena for safety. Many Italian nobles, not least the Duke of Bracciano – head of the House of Orsini – disassociated themselves from the French party, and the ambassador was only frequented by a few loyalists, including Christine of Sweden. As the effects of the excommunication were felt, it became more and more difficult for him to remain in office; because of the ban on him, it was Cardinal d'Estrées who was responsible for managing current affairs with the Holy See. The Lord of Beaumanoir then enlisted 200 additional soldiers, bringing his small army to 400 men. This unexpected initiative aroused the suspicion of the king, who had his own officers watch the ambassador. (Note: It appears that the associated expenses were drawn from his personal funds.) For Jacques Bainville, "the Marquis of Lavardin [...] was not to imitate Nogaret". (Note: Reference to the Anagni attack.) Lavardin, whose credit was damaged by the pontifical intransigence, finally asked to be recalled in early 1689. On 14 April 1689, Louis XIV accepted; this decision was due as much to the fact that he feared incidents as to a desire to appease the Holy See, made necessary by the situation in Europe. On 30 April, the Marquis left Rome, accompanied by France's two agents of influence within the Sacred College, Cardinal d'Estrées and Cardinal Maidalchini, and his 200 men-at-arms. This strong escort did not spare him a final episode: to humiliate him, the governor of the duchy of Milan provided him with a passport in which he was designated as "appointed ambassador". Inflexible, Lavardin asked for the document to be corrected and obtained it on June 17; he was back at the court of Versailles on July 16. Innocent XI died on August 16, 1689; the reconciliation with Alexander VIII was achieved at the price of the French ambassador's renunciation of the franchises.

=== Return to France ===
==== Decline in Breton freedoms ====
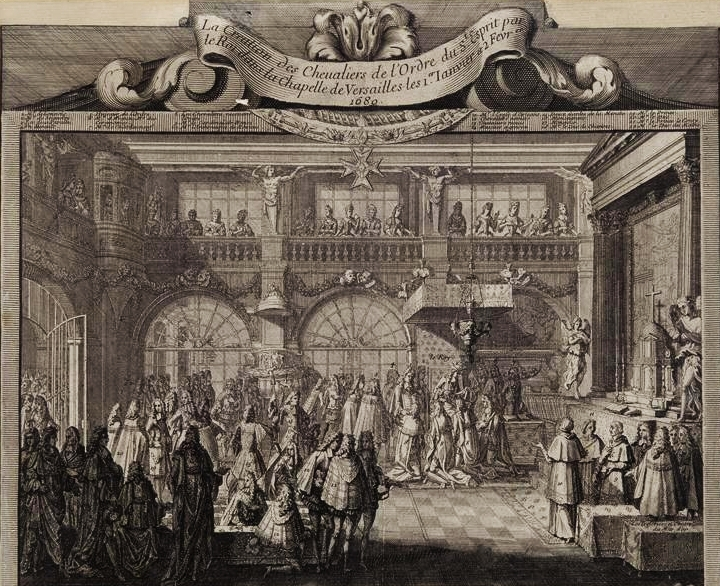
Reception of the Knights of the Order of the Holy Spirit in the Royal Chapel of Versailles, January 1, 1689.

On his return to France, he resumed his position as Lieutenant general of Brittany, which he never ceased to hold. On December 31, 1688, he was made a Knight of the Order of the Holy Spirit by King Louis XIV in Versailles. However, in 1689, the government of Brittany underwent two major changes. In February, Pomereu, the king's intendant, was permanently appointed. Brittany was the last French province to be endowed with such an agent of the king; the monarch surely felt that European tensions justified this increase in absolutism in a country of states within reach of the English coast. In August of the same year, Jean II d'Estrées was appointed commander-in-chief of Brittany. The governor was thus flanked by two king's commissioners, the intendant for civil matters (including the bourgeois militia), and the commander-in-chief for matters relating to the professional army; the king's officers had their powers considerably reduced.

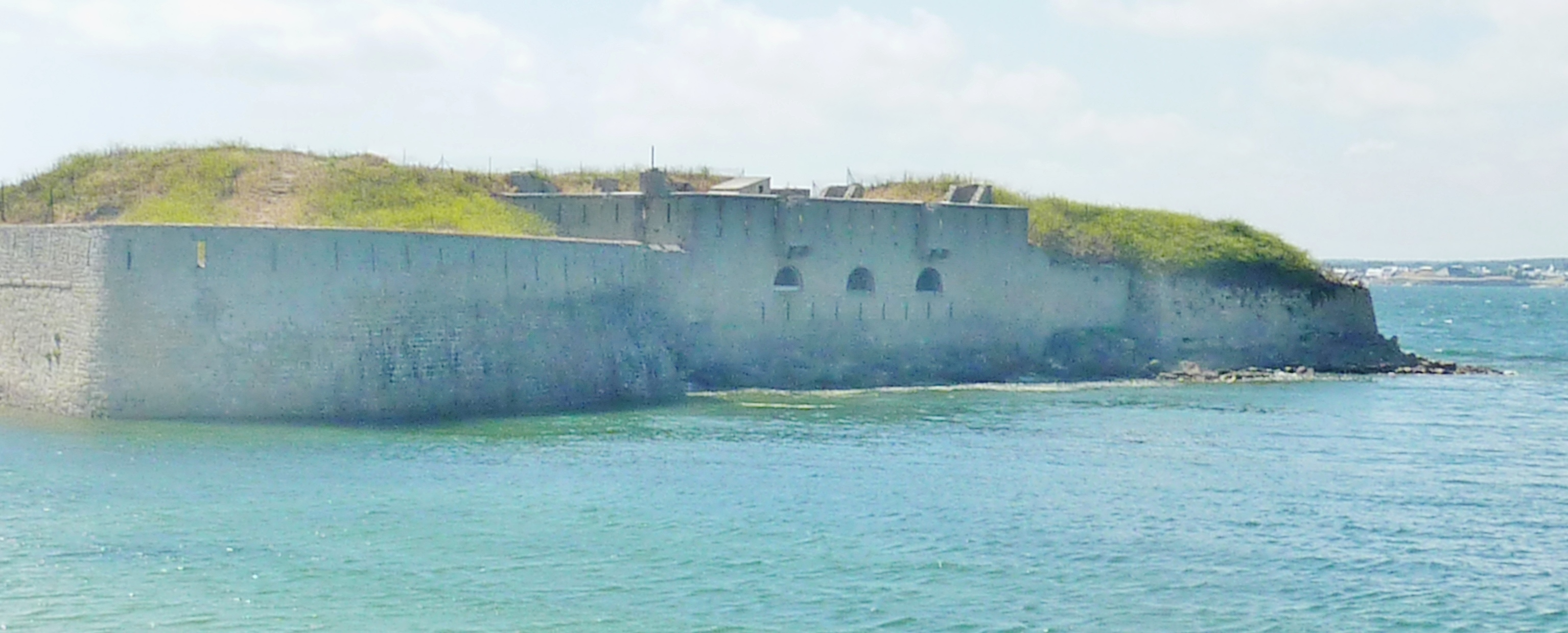
Porh-Puns Fort, which the Marquis decided to build in 1695.

This reorganisation coincided with the sending of the Duke of Chaulnes as ambassador to the Holy See. The governor returned to Brittany in 1691, 1692 and 1693 to take military command, but he was explicitly asked to do so by the king. In 1695, Louis XIV obtained his resignation and replaced him with the Count of Toulouse, his legitimate bastard son; the latter renounced direct administration of the province and only went there on royal request. As for the Marquis of Lavardin, his military prerogatives were also limited by the arrival of the king's commissioners, but a certain permanence of his former functions left him with considerable autonomy. Thus, in 1695, during the war of the League of Augsburg, he convened the rearguard and organised the blocs of some of the troops defending Brittany. In 1697, in the absence of Marshal d'Estrées, he also blocked the claims of Admiral of Châtellerault – previously integrated into the land defence of the province – to replace the commander-in-chief at the head of the army of Brittany, and said to him: "Officers on land do not command at sea and those at sea would command at both [...], this has never been seen". On the other hand, he suffered a setback in 1696: having opposed the establishment of a patrol in Rennes on the grounds that he was not going to re-arm a town that he had disarmed during the revolt of 1675, he was proven wrong by the Council of Finance and the Controller General overruled his opinion, which was deemed anachronistic. After him, his successors at the lieutenancy general would only have nominal power.

==== Admiralty rights case in Brittany ====
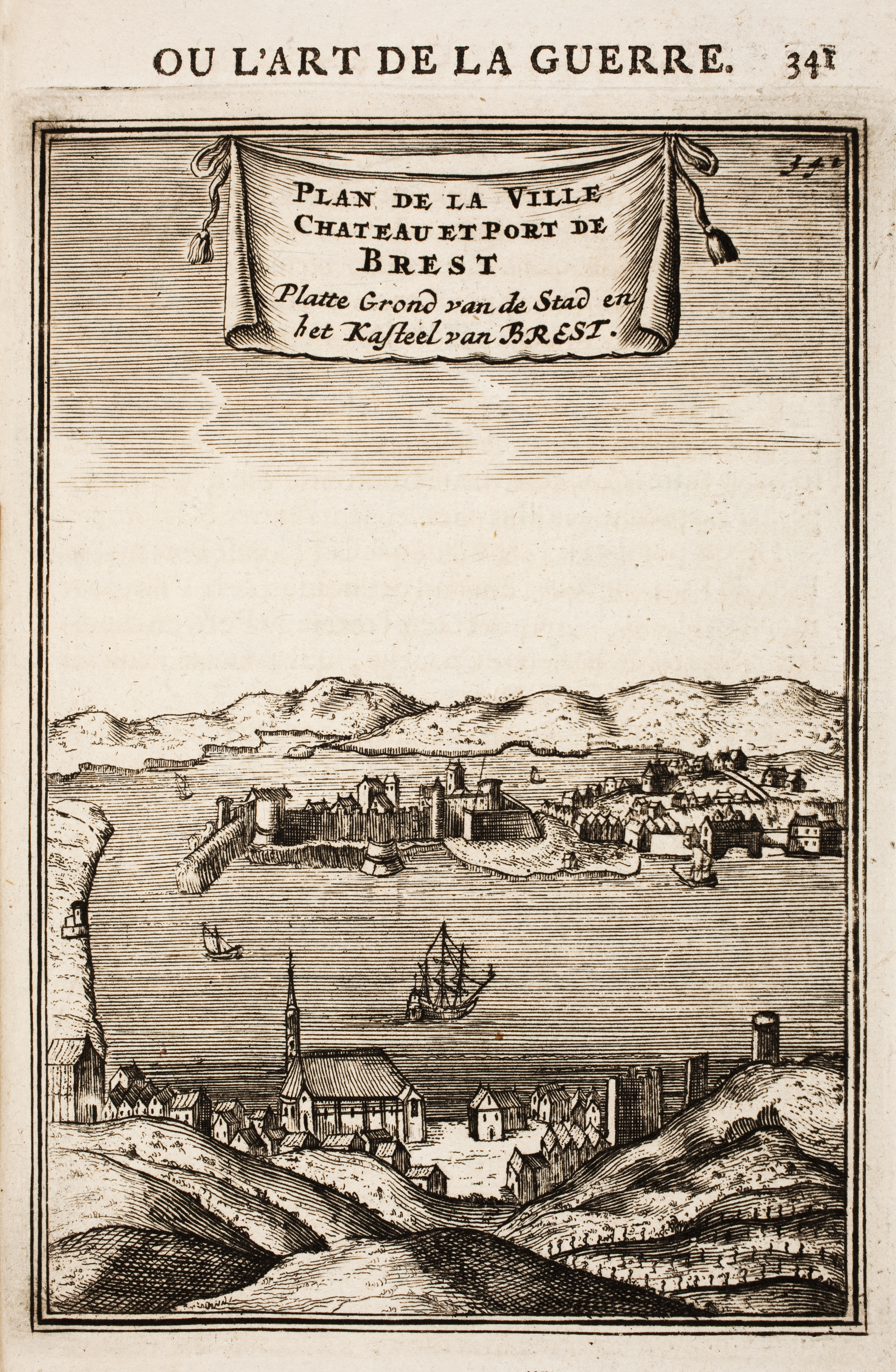
Brest and its port in 1696.

The replacement of the Duke of Chaulnes by the comte de Toulouse in 1695 was an opportunity for the Marquis of Lavardin to take part in the long-running conflict (Note: Already, in 1666, the rights to the tenth of Duke of Beaufort were contested by the states of Brittany.) between the Governor of Brittany and the Admiralty of France over the rights of the Admiralty of Brittany. Among these rights, the most contested was the tenth of the catches of the Race War, which authorised the levying of a tenth of the value of goods seized by privateers. The Admiralty of France – headed by the Count of Toulouse since 1683 – contested the governors' claim to the rights of the Admiralty of Brittany and demanded the collection of the tenth of catches for all the King's ships, including those armed in the port of Saint-Malo, and for Breton ships that had Brest as their home port, as this city was temporarily administered by the Admiralty of France. On the contrary, the Duke of Chaulnes claimed ownership for both the Breton ships based in Brest and the King's ships based in Saint-Malo. The disgrace of the Duke of Chaulnes, threatened with repayment of unduly collected duties, led Lavardin to defend the rights of the governors, with the help of the States of Brittany.

He claims that in 1532, one of the conditions of Brittany's union with France was that it would retain all the privileges recognised by Anne of Brittany's marriage contracts, and in particular "the right for the governor and his lieutenant general to assume the respective functions of admiral and vice-admiral in Brittany". This thesis was strongly opposed by Jean-Baptiste-Henri of Valincour, Secretary General of the Navy, who pointed out that there was no mention of governors in the above-mentioned acts; he also defended the position that the vice-admirals of Brittany had always been appointed by the admirals of France. Eight months after the appointment of the Earl of Toulouse as governor, Louis XIV asked the States of Brittany to justify the province's claims, while Valincour was given the responsibility of defending the French admiral. It was not until six years later that, on May 30, 1701, on the advice of a commission and his ministers, Louis XIV issued a decree confirming the governors in the rights of the admiralty of Brittany and maintaining the claims of the Marquis of Lavardin. On the other hand, the port of Brest was definitively returned to the Admiral of France and a tenth of the catches was attributed to the authorities who issued the commission to the racing ships, an issue reserved for the King's ships to the Admiral of France.

Henri-Charles de Beaumanoir died on 29 August 1701 in Paris and was buried in the cathedral of Saint-Julien in Le Mans, in the family vault of the Beaumanoirs of Lavardin, (Note: He is buried there alongside his great-grandfather Marshal of Lavardin and his great-grandmother Catherine de Carmaing, his grand-uncle, his father, his mother and his two wives.) a relatively notable fact for an excommunicate. On hearing of his death, the Duke of Saint-Simon wrote severely in his Memoirs: "He was an extremely ugly fat man, very witty and very decorative, and of mediocre conduct. [...] He was accused of being very stingy, difficult to live with, and of having inherited the leprosy of the Rostaing family, whose mother was. He said that in his life he had never left the table without an appetite, and enough to eat well again. His gout, his gravel, and the age at which he died, did not persuade anyone to imitate his diet".

== Bibliography ==
=== Government of Brittany ===
- Aubert, Gauthier (2010). Les Parlements de Louis XIV – Parlement et maintien de l'ordre : Rennes (1662–1675) (in French). Presses universitaires de Rennes. pp. 227–239. ISBN 978-2-7535-6713-9.
- Aubert, Gauthier (2014). Les révoltes du papier timbré (1675) : Essai d'histoire événementielle (in French). Presses universitaires de Rennes. p. 718. ISBN 978-2-7535-5947-9.
- Le Bouëdec, Gérard (2012). L'Amirauté en Bretagne: Des origines à la fin du XVIII (in French). Presses universitaires de Rennes. ISBN 978-2-7535-6878-5.
- Collins, James B. (2006). "Le problème de l'ordre". Les Parlements de Louis XIV - Parlement et maintien de l'ordre : Rennes (1662-1675) (in French). Translated by André, Rannou. Presses universitaires de Rennes. pp. 273–293. ISBN 978-2-7535-3171-0.
- Jean, Lemoine. La révolte dite du papier timbré ou des bonnets rouges en Bretagne en 1675 : Etude et documents (in French). Champion. p. 373.
- Perréon, Stéphane (2005). L'armée en Bretagne au XVIIIe siècle : Institution militaire et société civile au temps de l'intendance et des États (in French). Presses universitaires de Rennes. p. 421.

=== Louis XIV and Innocent XI ===
- Pierre Blet (1972). Les assemblées du Clergé et Louis XIV de 1670 à 1693 (in French) (Università Gregoriana ed.). Rome: Università Gregoriana. p. 633.
- Pierre Blet (1974). "Louis XIV et le Saint-Siège à la lumière de deux publications récentes : Le conflit de la régale, la fable de l'excommunication secrète et la réconciliation de 1693". Archivum Historiae Pontificiae (in French). 12: 309–337. ISSN 0066-6785. JSTOR 23563646.
- Gérin, Charles (1874). L'ambassade de Lavardin et la séquestration du nonce Ranuzzi (1687–1689) (in French) (Università Gregoriana ed.). Paris: Librairie de Victor Palmé. p. 55.
- Jean Orcibal (1949). Louis XIV contre Innocent XI : Les appels au futur concile de 1688 et l'opinion française (in French). Paris: Librairie philosophique J. Vrin. p. 107.
- Eugène Michaux (1882). Louis XIV et Innocent XI, d'après les correspondances diplomatiques inédites du ministère des affaires étrangères de France (in French). Paris: G. Charpentier. p. 630.
- Neveu, Bruno (1973). La correspondance du nonce en France Angelo Ranuzzi (1683–1689) (in French). Rome: Université Pontificale Grégorienne.
- Neveu, Bruno (1967). "Jacques II médiateur entre Louis XIV et Innocent XI". Mélanges de l'École française de Rome (in French). 79 (2): 699–764. doi:10.3406/mefr.1967.7548.
- J. de Récalde (1973). Le message du Sacré-Cœur à Louis XIV et le père de La Chaise : Etude historique et critique (in French). Paris: Chiron. p. 124.
