= Commissaire =

Commissaire may refer to:

- Commissary, a state official in the police or armed forces
  - Commissaire de police, in the French National Police
  - Commissaire des guerres, in the French Army
- Commissaire (cycling), an official in competitive cycling

== See also ==
- Commissioner
