= Coutumes de Beauvaisis =

Book on medieval French law by Philippe de Beaumanoir

The Coutumes of Beauvaisis is a book on medieval French law composed by Philippe de Beaumanoir at the end of the 13th century in Old French prose. The text covers a wide range of topics both on procedural and substantive law and is quite voluminous, which explains its attractiveness to scholars. The bibliography of the Coutumes is large, although it contains mostly articles and only few subject-specific books. The latest edition has been prepared by Amédée Salmon and was published back in 1899–1900, respecting the original old French syntax. It has not been put into modern French, but translations exist in English and Japanese.

== Authorship ==
During a long period of time the author of the text had been falsely identified as poet Philippe de Rémi, bailli of the Gâtinais, who was renowned for his 20,000 verses of poems including La Manekine, Jehan et Blonde and Salut d’amour. As a result, in the 19th and at the beginning of 20th century Philippe de Rémi was usually described as a prominent person capable both in poetry and law. However, it is now accepted that the author was the poet's son and namesake, jurist Philippe de Rémi.

== Bibliography ==
=== Text and translations ===
- Beaumanoir, Philippe de (1899–1900). Coutumes de Beauvaisis. Texte critique publié avec une introduction, un glossaire et une table analytique par Am. Salmon. Paris: A. Picard et fils.
  - Coutumes de Beauvaisis Tome 1 online on Gallica2
  - Coutumes de Beauvaisis Tome 2 online on Gallica2
- Beaumanoir, Philippe de (1842). Les coutumes du Beauvoisis. Publications pour la Société de l'histoire de France [Texte imprimé]. - Paris : Renouard, 1835-. Auguste-Arthur Beugnot (ed.). Paris: J. Renouard. p. 539.
- Akehurst, F. R. P. (March 1992). The Coutumes de Beauvaisis of Philippe de Beaumanoir. University of Pennsylvania Press. p. 749. ISBN 0-8122-3105-8.
- Gaspard Thaumas de la Thaumassière, Coustumes de Beauvaisis (1690 edition) at the Internet Archive

=== Studies ===
- Heller, Sarah-Grace; Michelle Reichert (November 2001). Essays on the Poetic and Legal Writings of Philippe De Remy and His Son Phiilippe De Beaumanoir of Thirteenth-Century France. Edwin Mellen Press. p. 304. ISBN 0-7734-7383-1.
- Groupe d'étude des monuments et œuvres d'art de l'Oise et du Beauvaisis (1983). Colloque scientifique international organisé pour la commémoration du VIIe centenaire des "Coutumes et usages du Beauvaisis" de Philippe de Beaumanoir. Beauvais: GEMOB. p. 136.
- Giordanengo, Gérard (1999). "Jus commune et "Droit commun" en France du XIIIe au XVe siècle". Droit romain, "jus civile" et droit français. Études d'histoire du droit et des idées politiques. Toulouse: Presses de l'Université des sciences sociales. pp. 219–247.
- Petot, Pierre (1960). "Le droit commun en France selon les coutumiers". Revue historique de droit français et étranger (38): 412–429.
- Wetter, Paul van (1969). "Le droit romain et Beaumanoir". Mélanges Fitting (LXXVe anniversaire M. le Professeur Hermann Fitting). Vol. 2. Frankfurt am Main. pp. 533–582.
- Бессмертный, Юрий Львович (1969). Феодальная деревня и рынок в западной Европе XII – XIII в.в. Moscow: Наука. p. 370.
- Schenck, Mary Jane (1995). "ORAL CUSTOMS AND WRITTEN CASES IN THE COUTUMES DE BEAUVAISIS OF PHILIPPE DE BEAUMANOIR". Archived from the original on 2010-12-01.

=== Dictionaries and reference items ===
- Division, Library of Congress European Law; Jean Caswell; Ivan Sipkov. The Coutumes of France in the Library of Congress. p. 15.
- Hiram Kümper (2005). "Beaumanoir, Philippe de". In Bautz, Traugott (ed.). Biographisch-Bibliographisches Kirchenlexikon (BBKL) (in German). Vol. 24. Nordhausen: Bautz. cols. 208–211. ISBN 3-88309-247-9.
