= Philippe de Rémi =

Philippe de Rémi or Philippe de Beaumanoir may refer to:

- Philippe de Rémi (died 1265) (1210–1265), poet and bailli, also sire de Beaumanoir
- Philippe de Rémi (died 1296) (1247–1296), his son, jurist and royal official
