= Michel Ferdinand d'Albert, 5th Duke of Chaulnes =

French astronomer

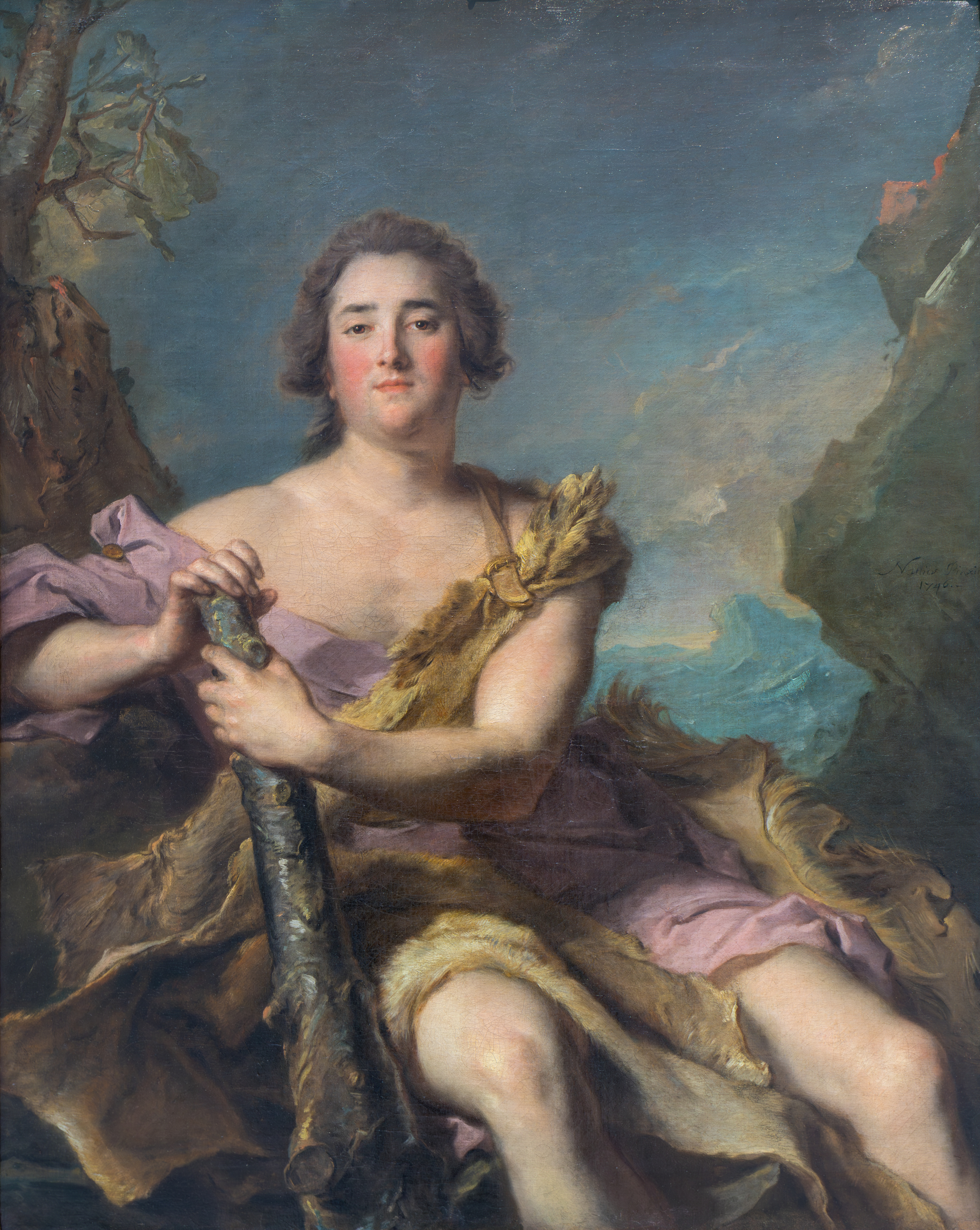
Michel Ferdinand d'Albert d'Ailly, Duke of Chaulnes, as Hercules, by Jean-Marc Nattier.

Michel Ferdinand d'Albert, 5th Duke of Chaulnes (31 December 1714 – 23 September 1769), Duke of Picquigny and then Duke of Chaulnes from 1744, was a French astronomer, physicist and freemason.

== Early life ==
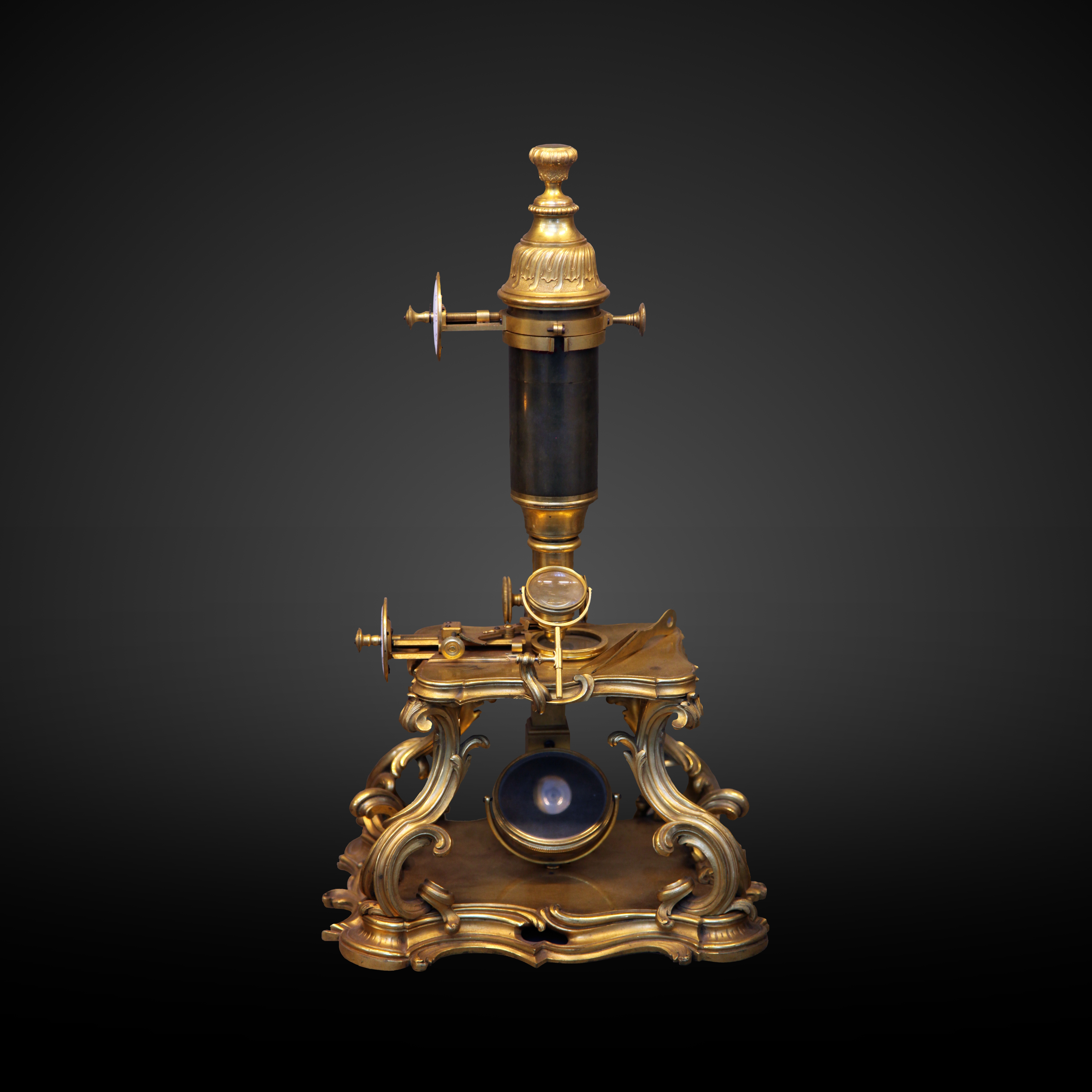
Compouned microscope of Albert d'Ailly, on display at Conservatoire national des arts et métiers.

Michel Ferdinand d'Albert d'Ailly was the younger son of Marie Anne Romaine de Beaumanoir and Louis Auguste d'Albert d'Ailly, 4th Duke of Chaulnes (1676–1744). His elder brother was Charles François d'Albert d'Ailly, 5th Duke of Chaulnes (1707–1731).

His paternal grandfather was Charles Honoré d'Albert, 3rd Duke of Luynes. Among his cousins were Charles Philippe d'Albert de Luynes, the 4th Duke of Luynes as well as the astronomer Paul d'Albert de Luynes, Cardinal and Archbishop of Sens.

== Career ==
He commanded the light cavalry of the Maison du Roi (English: King's Household). In 1750 he became the king's commissioner to the Estates of Brittany and persuaded the assembly to accept the Vingtième tax.

=== Scientific interests ===
As an astronomer and physicist he was particularly interested in scientific instruments and used most of his income to build and collect them. His estate contains a remarkable amount of rare and curious items collected from Egypt, Greece, China, including Etruscan vases of all types, antique bronzes and natural history specimens.

At a time when physicists were abandoning glass globe electrostatic generators, which used sulphur or resin, to use glass plates instead, the Duke of Chaulnes built the largest machine of this type that had yet been seen. He used it to produce the effects of lightning for the first time in France.

In 1743, he was made an honorary member of the Académie des sciences. Two years after, he published a memoir in article form which described his experiments, and was included at the beginning of Newton's Opticks Bk. IV. In this work he described his discovery of the peculiarities of the diffraction of light rays reflected by a concave mirror and how they might be stopped by a board pierced in the middle. In 1765, he introduced an astronomical instrument fitted with two achromatic lenses. He also invented a new microscope and had it built in England; his description of the microscope included several plates. He first thought of the manufacture of artificial mineral water.

His final work was a thesis on a new triquetrum which was stronger and easier to use than previous models.

== Personal life ==
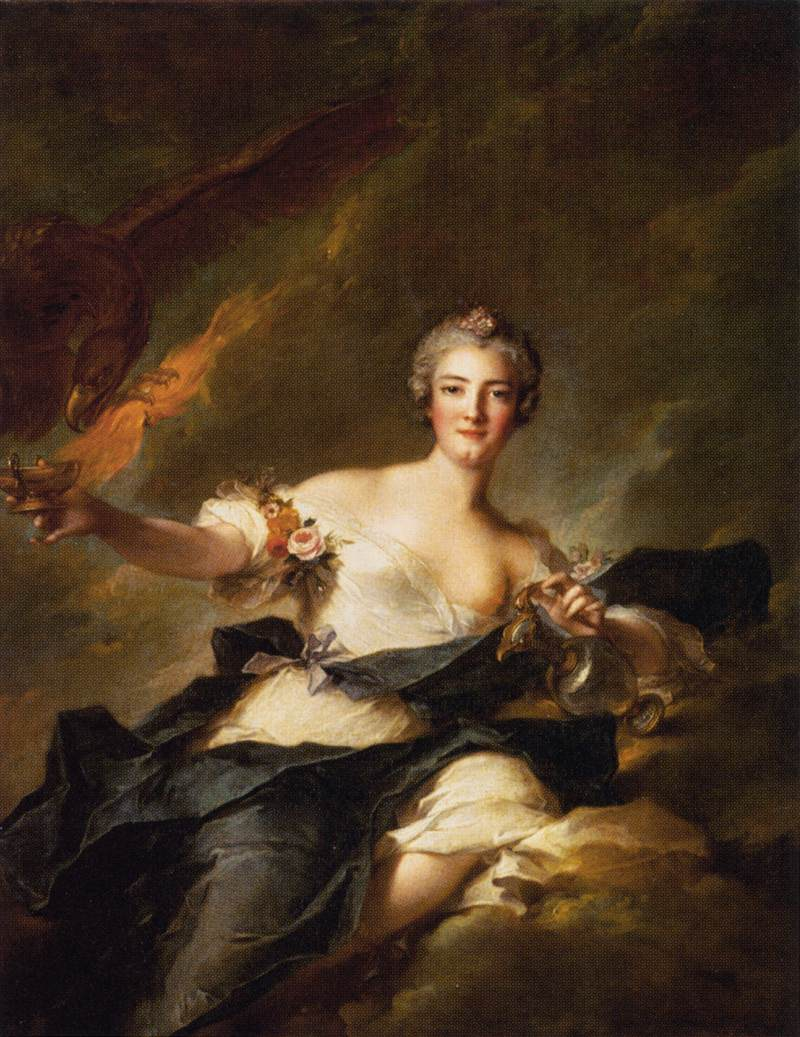
His wife, the Duchess of Chaulnes (née Anne Josèphe Bonnier) depicted as the goddess Hebe, by Jean Marc Nattier, 1744

He married Anne Josèphe Bonnier (1718–1787), who replaced the Viscountess of Beaune in 1766 as one of Queen Marie Leszczynska's ladies-in-waiting. Together, they were the parents of:

- Louis Joseph d'Albert d'Ailly (1741–1792), who inherited the dukedom and married his cousin, Marie Paule Angélique d'Albert (1744–1781), a daughter of Charles Louis d'Albert de Luynes. She served as Lady of the Queen and accompany of the Dauphin (1770-1774).

He died in Paris in 1769. His eulogy was published in the 1769 volume of the anthology of the Académie des sciences.

== Publications ==
- Nouvelle Méthode pour diviser les instruments de mathématiques, in Description des arts et métiers, published by the Académie des sciences, 1768, in-fol. 44 p. with 15 illustrations.
- Description d'un microscope et de différents micromètres destinés à mesurer des parties circulaires ou droites avec la plus grande précision at Google Books, Paris, 1768, in-fol. 18 p. with 6 illustrations. With this method, the Duke managed to obtain, from a quadrant with a radius of 11 inches, almost the same precision as from a quadrant with a radius of six feet which was at the observatory. He had already published the principles of this work in a thesis of 1755. Some parts of it were also in the Journal de Physique.
- Six works in the anthology of the Académie des sciences.
