= Beaumanoir =

Beaumanoir was a seigniory in what is now the department of Côtes-d'Armor, France, which gave its name to an illustrious family.

- Philippe de Rémi (died 1265), French poet and bailiff
- Philippe de Rémi (died 1296), French jurist and royal official
- Jean de Beaumanoir (1310–1366/7), marshal of Brittany
- Jean de Beaumanoir (marquis) (1551–1614), French seigneur, marshal and afterwards marquis de Lavardin
- Lucas de Beaumanoir, fictional Grand Master of the Templars in Walter Scott's 1819 novel Ivanhoe
