= Jacques Claude Beugnot =

French politician (1761–1835)

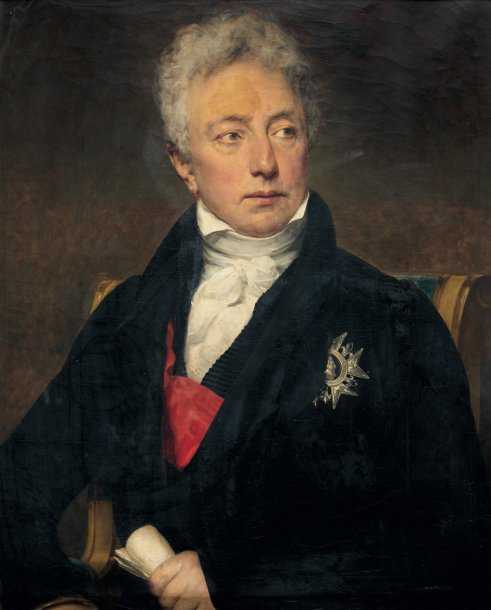
- Circle of Louis Hersent, Portrait of Jacques-Claude, Comte Beugnot
- Born: Jacques Claude Beugnot; 25 July 1761; Bar-sur-Aube, Champagne, France
- Died: 24 June 1835 (aged 73)
- Known for: deputy to the Legislative Assembly, préfet

Jacques Claude, comte Beugnot (English: /bʊˈnjoʊ/ bu-NYOH, French: [ʒak klod bøɲo]; 25 July 1761 – 24 June 1835) was a French politician before, during, and after the French Revolution. His son Auguste Arthur Beugnot was an historian and scholar.

== Biography ==
=== Revolution ===
Born at Bar-sur-Aube (Aube), he served as a magistrate under the ancien régime, and was elected deputy to the Legislative Assembly (1791). A Feuillant and later a Girondist, he was proscribed along with the Girondists after François Hanriot's intervention and the trial of October 1793, and was imprisoned in the Conciergerie until the Thermidorian Reaction.

=== Napoleon ===
He next entered into relations with the family of Napoleon Bonaparte, and in 1799, after the coup of 18 Brumaire, again entered politics, becoming successively préfet of the Seine-Inférieure département, member of the Conseil d'État, and finance minister to Jérôme Bonaparte, King of Westphalia, during the First French Empire.

In 1808 Beugnot, who had meanwhile been appointed administrator of the Grand Duchy of Berg-Cleves, received the cross of an Officier de la Légion d'honneur with the title of count. He returned to France in 1813, after the battle of Leipzig, and was made prefect of the département of Nord.

=== Bourbons ===
In 1814, he was a member of the provisional government as Minister of the Interior, and rallied to the House of Bourbon. King Louis XVIII named him director-general of police and afterwards Naval Minister. He followed Louis to Ghent during the Hundred Days, became one of his confidants, and contributed to draw up Louis's Charter. He claimed (in his Mémoires) to have also furnished the text of the proclamation addressed by the king to the French people before his return to France - but it is known now that it was another text that was adopted.

Stendhal, in his Memoirs of an Egoist, refers to Beugnot as "a man with the vanity of two Frenchmen." Beugnot had offered Stendhal a prominent position, and Stendhal had refused.

After the full Bourbon Restoration, lacking the support of the Ultra-royalists, he was given the title of Minister of State without portfolio, which was equivalent to a retirement. Elected deputy, he attached himself to the moderate party, and defended the liberty of the press. In 1830, he was made a Peer of France by Charles X, and confirmed by Louis-Philippe I after the July Revolution, becoming and director-general of manufactures and commerce.

Political offices
Preceded by Pierre Victor, baron Malouet	Ministers of Marine and the Colonies; 7 September 1814 – 20 March 1815	Succeeded by Denis Decrès
