= Auguste-Arthur, Comte de Beugnot =

French historian and statesman

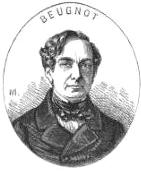
Auguste-Arthur, Comte de Beugnot

Count Auguste-Arthur Beugnot (English: /bʊˈnjoʊ/ bu-NYOH, French: [oɡyst aʁtyʁ bøɲo]; 25 March 1797, Bar-sur-Aube – 15 March 1865, Paris) was a French historian and statesman. He was a son of Jacques-Claude Beugnot. Originally he adopted the profession of advocate, but soon abandoned it in order to devote himself entirely to the study of history and especially the history of the Crusades.

== Politics ==
Beugnot entered politics in 1841 as a Peer of France, was Deputy for Haute-Marne in the Chamber of 1849, and, under the Second Empire, went into a retirement that lasted until his death.

The Villemain educational plan of 1844 to subject the heads of independent institutions to the jurisdiction of the university to impose upon their pupils the obligation of making their studies in rhetoric and philosophy in certain prescribed establishments was opposed by Beugnot on liberal principles, whilst others opposed it on religious grounds. This project was withdrawn in January 1845, its author having become demented. Beugnot, who had destroyed the draft of a speech in support of the Villemain programme, was welcomed by the Catholics as a labourer entering the vineyard at the eleventh hour.

In 1845, he advocated the claim of the bishops, as of all other citizens, to the right of petition. In his pamphlet, L'État théologien, he wrote that the attacks on the Jesuits were attempts to destroy liberty of association, and the Jesuits empowered him to treat with Guizot in their name at the time of the negotiations between France and the Holy See in regard to the dispersion of the Society. As drafter of the Law of 1850 on Liberty of Teaching, he vainly endeavoured to prevent the return of the bill to the Council of State, 7 November 1849, and in the decisive debate (14 January to 15 March 1850) he seconded the efforts of Montalembert, Parieu, and Thiers which resulted in victory for the Catholics.

== Writings ==
Beugnot shared with François Mignet the prize of the Académie des Inscriptions (1818) for the best essay on the institutions of St. Louis. The competitions of 1822 and 1831 led to his work on The Jews of the West and his History of the Destruction of Paganism in the West (1835), in consequence of which he was elected to the Académie des Inscriptions in 1832. The former of these works was more known at the time; it was placed on the Index. It was largely replaced by Otto Seeck's treatise on the same subject. Les Juifs d'Occident, ou recherches sur l'état civil, le commerce et la littérature des Juifs en France, en Espagne, et en Italie pendant la durée du Moyen-Âge, (Paris, 1824) is an essay with serious errors, and poor knowledge of ancient Jewish history. He asserts that Julian the Apostate never granted to the Jews permission for the rebuilding of the Temple. The author does not attempt to minimise the persecution of the Jews in the Middle Ages.

He produced editions of the Assizes of Jerusalem (1841–43), of Beaumanoir's book of the Customs of Beauvaisis (1842), and of Les Olim ou Registres des Arrêts, or ancient registers of the Parlement of Paris (1839–48). These editions are of value for the history of feudal and customary law. He was associated with the voluminous publication of the Historians of the Crusades, which began in a memoir written by him in 1834.
