= Commissariat =

Organization operated by a commissary

A commissariat is a department or organization commanded by a commissary or by a corps of commissaries.

In many countries, commissary is a police rank. In those countries, a commissariat is a police station commanded by a commissary.

In some armies, commissaries are logistic officers. In those countries, a commissariat is a department charged with the provision of supplies, both food and forage, for the troops. The supply of military stores such as ammunition is not included in the duties of a commissariat. In almost every army the duties of transport and supply are performed by the same corps of departmental troops.

== British Army ==
=== 17th century ===
When James II mustered an army on Hounslow Heath in 1685, he appointed a certain John Shales as Commissary General of provisions, responsible for sourcing, storing and issuing food for the troops and forage for the horses. In addition he was to license and regulate sutlers, to procure wagons, carriages, horses and drivers when required for transport and to account for all payments to the Lord High Treasurer and the Paymaster-General of His Majesty's Forces. Following the Glorious Revolution of 1688, Shales was reappointed Commissary-General (though he was subsequently accused of mismanagement and replaced).

=== 18th century ===
After 1694 the appointment lapsed, though it was reinstated subsequently from time to time on a more geographically-specific basis, for a particular expedition, theatre of war or colonial garrison. Otherwise, in the eighteenth century, arrangements for supply and transport tended to be devolved to individual regiments, who would work with a combination of civilian contractors and other agencies. The only centralized control at this time was that exercised by HM Treasury, which ultimately authorised expenditure. In 1793, however, with Britain at war with France, a Commissary-General for Britain was once again appointed and in 1797 a number of District Commissaries were engaged and made accountable to him: the beginnings of a more permanent Commissariat; his remit, however, was limited to the British mainland (and even there some areas, including barracks, were separately administered). Away from Britain's shores, the army was provided for independently as before.

=== 19th century ===
In 1809 things began to change with the appointment of a Commissary-in-chief to superintend both the home and foreign Commissariat services. The Commissariat was still a department of HM Treasury and its personnel were uniformed civilians (though they were subject to military discipline). It now supplied food, fuel and forage for all troops, as well as certain other equipment including barrack stores. The main items outside its remit were arms and ammunition, which were the responsibility of the Board of Ordnance. The Commissariat's officers held ranks ranging from Commissary-General (equivalent to a Brigadier-General in the Army) to Deputy Assistant Commissary-General (equivalent to a Lieutenant) with Commissary Clerks akin to NCOs. Under the Treasury the Commissariat was organised into two branches: Stores and Accounts. Transport (albeit nominally a responsibility of the Stores Branch) was something of a poor relation; this in part led to the Commander-in-chief establishing a separate Royal Waggon Train.

After the end of the Napoleonic Wars the office of Commissary-in-chief was abolished and the Treasury moved to consolidate the department's remit. In 1822 the Stores Branch (along with its warehouses and staff both at home and abroad) was transferred to the Board of Ordnance, which also took on responsibility for provision of food, forage and fuel to troops in England ten years later. Thereafter the Commissariat Department became principally a financial office: its fund (the Commissariat Chest) was used to provide a form of banking service for public services in the Colonies; in the words of a Treasury memorandum laid before Parliament in 1841:

The Commissariat raises keeps and disburses, according to fixed regulations, the whole of the funds required to carry the foreign expenditure of this country. […] An account is constantly kept open by means of the Commissariat chests between Great Britain and all its Foreign dependencies so that if a sum has to be received or paid in Canada, Australia or China for any branch of the Public Service it may be done by a transfer in the Commissariat Chest Account, without any remittance. The Commissariat officers act in effect as Sub Treasurers to the Lords Commissioners of the Treasury in the foreign possessions of the Crown".

Provision of food, forage and fuel for the army abroad remained a (albeit secondary) responsibility of the Commissariat at this time.

In its much reduced form, the Commissariat infamously struggled to deal with the complexities of supplying the Army during Crimean War; in December 1854 control of the military functions of the Commissariat were transferred to the War Office. The Commissariat remained a uniformed civilian service until 1869, when its officers transferred to the new Control Department as commissioned Army officers. The supply organization of the British Army then went through a number of incarnations, including the Commissariat and Transport Department, Staff and Corps, before becoming the Army Service Corps in 1888.

==== In popular culture ====
In the "Major General's Song" in The Pirates of Penzance by Gilbert and Sullivan, the Major-General boasts that when, among many other bits and pieces of seemingly elementary or irrelevant information, he "know(s) precisely what is meant by commissariat", he will be the best officer the army has ever seen (satirizing 19th century British officers' lack of concrete military knowledge). That line can perhaps also be read in a second and very different way; since that work was first performed in 1878, when the Army's Commissariat was at the height of change, as outlined in the paragraph above, the suggestion that the Major-General did not know precisely what the term meant may perhaps have been also a very pointed satirical allusion to that rapidly changing situation.

== Penal colonies in Australia ==
In the penal colonies of New South Wales and Van Dieman's Land (now Tasmania), the Commissariat Department also had responsibility for the needs of convicts and, in the early days, provisions sold by storekeepers, as well as for military garrisons and naval victualing. This practice dated from the inception of the colony in 1788, before the colony was self-sufficient in food production. The Governors of the colonies were military men, and the administration of stores was performed by commissary officers. After 1855, the Commissariat Department only had responsibility for the provisions of military forces, the few remaining convicts, and lunatics. It was abolished, in New South Wales, in 1870 when the last British military forces departed. Similar arrangements applied in the Moreton Bay penal colony (originally part of New South Wales) and Western Australia.

== Soviet Army and modern Russian Army ==
Military commissariats of the Soviet Army and modern Russian Army is a local military administrative agency that prepares and executes plans for military mobilization, maintains records on military manpower and economic resources available to the armed forces, provides pre-military training, drafts men for military service, organizes reserves for training, and performs other military functions at the local level.

== Religious usage ==
=== Roman Catholic ===
Among Roman Catholic religious orders, the term Commissariat refers to a division of the Order which is a semi-autonomous body. It is considered less viable than a full Province, but with potential to develop into such, or it serves a group within the Order who are best served separately than in a Province into which they would otherwise be forced, e.g., due to language divisions. As with military usage, the Religious Superior of the division is referred to as the Commissary. The term is most commonly used among Franciscan Orders.

=== Zoroastrians ===
The term is also used among Indian Zoroastrians.

== See also ==
- Commissaire de police
- Commissariat de l'armée de terre
- Reichskommissariat – Territories of Nazi Germany during WWII
