= Revolt of the papier timbré =

1675 revolt in western France

Course of the rebellion

The revolt of the papier timbré was an anti-fiscal revolt in the Kingdom of France, occurring during the reign of Louis XIV from April to September 1675. It was fiercest in Lower Brittany, where it took on an anti-lordly tone and became known as the revolt of the Bonnets rouges (after the blue or red caps worn by the insurgents according to region) or revolt of the Torrebens (a war cry and signature in one of the peasant codes). It was unleashed by an increase in taxes, including the papier timbré, needed to authenticate official documents.

== Context ==
=== Franco-Dutch War ===
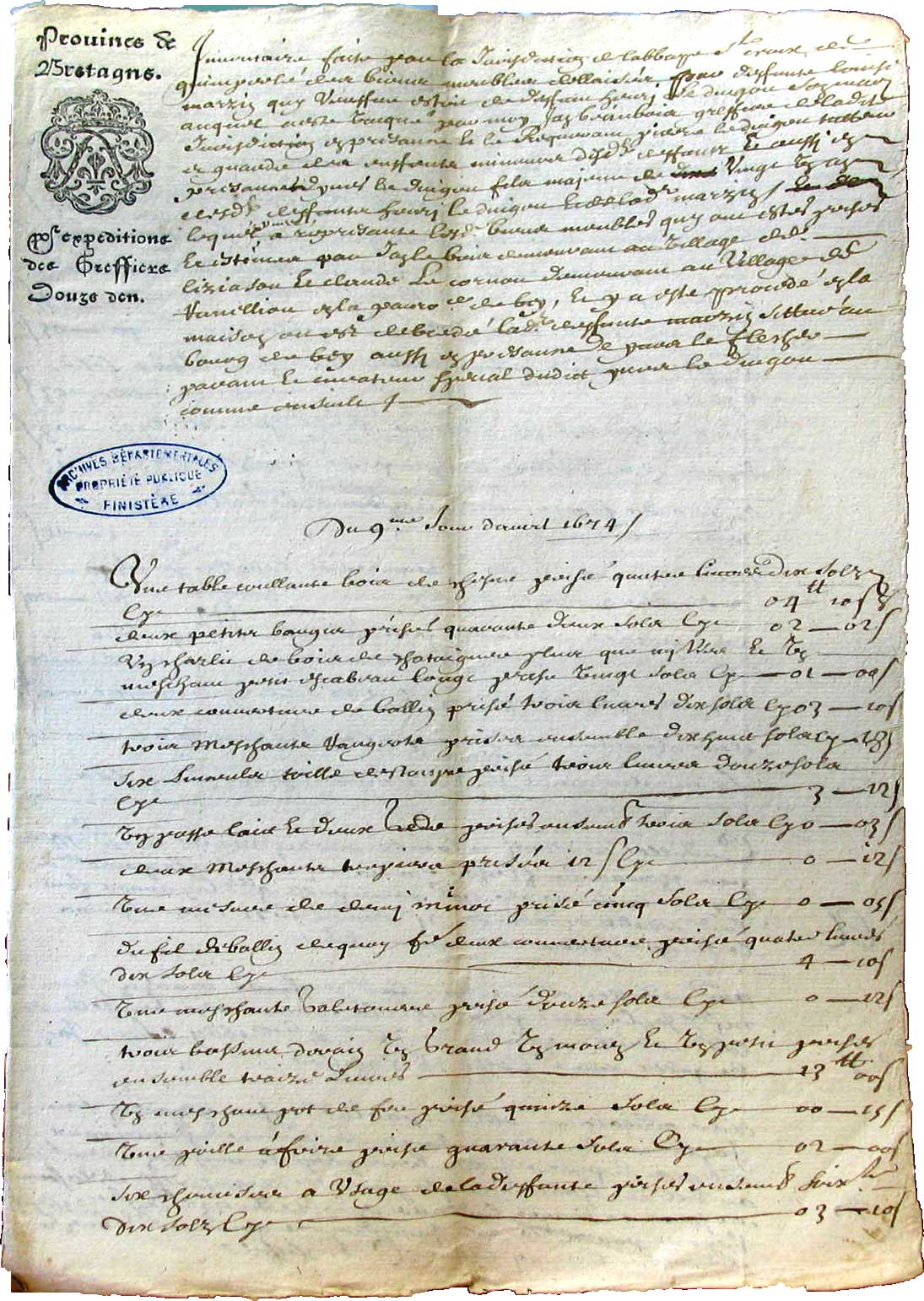
An example of one of the first acts produced on papier timbré at Quimperlé (9 April 1674, posthumous inventory edited by the jurisdiction of the abbaye de Sainte-Croix de Quimperlé)

Louis XIV declared war on the Dutch Republic in 1672. Unlike in the War of Devolution, after a rapid advance the French army was stopped by the Dutch deliberately breaching the dykes and flooding the land. The war dragged on. The Dutch fleet threatened the French coast, notably the Brittany coast, off which it cruised in April–May 1673 (after a landing on Belle-Île in 1673 and another landing on Groix in 1674). This interfered with Breton trade.

To finance the French war effort, new taxes were levied:

- first a tax on papier timbré (paper that was compulsory for all documents used in law, such as wills, sale contracts and vital records), in April 1674, raising the price of such documents, all the while risking a fall in the number of cases for professionals, leading to general discontent
- on 27 September 1674, the sale of tobacco was made a royal monopoly, which imposed a tax and sold it in afferme. Those the king authorised to re-sell the tobacco (fermiers and commis) bought stock from the merchants to whom they had sold it in the first place. The reorganisation of the distribution network resulted in a temporary interruption to the distribution of smoking and chewing tobacco, which also caused discontent
- in the same period, a new tax on all tin objects (even those bought long before) upset the peasants as well as the cabaretiers hit by the tax, which resulted in a high rise in the price of consumables
- finally another tax, affecting fewer people, required commoners in possession of a noble fiefdom to pay a tax every 20 years

=== Situation in Brittany ===
These threats and new taxes added to an already-difficult economic situation in Brittany, then a heavily populated area (with around 10% of France's population at the time) after being spared famines and epidemics since the 1640s. In the 1660s and 70s it entered a phase of economic difficulties, largely linked to the first effects of Louis XIV's policy of economic warfare, the simultaneous increase in taxes and structural weaknesses: for example, a 66% reduction in the wine and canvas trade after the duc de Chaulnes (nicknamed an hoc'h lart, "the fat pig", in Breton), governor of Brittany reduced the land revenues (fermages) and those on wine and canvas by a third, leading to general deflation, except offices.

In addition, the domain congéable system, which regulated the relationship between peasant farmers and the owners of the land they cultivated, was archaic, and gave no incentive to either peasants or landowners to invest in improvements in farming methods. Indeed, facing a fall in income after 1670, landlords became more punctilious in demanding their rights, which may have contributed to the uprising. This view however is disputed by Jean Meyer who noted that it is "questionable" whether there was any significant relation between the areas in which domain congéable operated and those in which the rebellion erupted. It may be significant that parishes outside the congéable system rebelled, while others within it did not. It may be added that the abolition of the system is not demanded in the surviving "peasant codes".

Women played an active role in the revolt. At this time, Royal law was significantly reducing both the economic and citizenship rights that women had formerly enjoyed. Women had no right to choose their own husbands for example. This struck hard in a land where women played a very important role, and this issue is identified in the peasant codes.

Finally, Brittany was a Pays d'États with its own parliaments, the Estates of Brittany and the Parliament of Brittany. It was exempted from the "gabelle" (salt tax), and new taxes should be agreed by the Estates, as guaranteed in 1532 Act of Union between Brittany and France. In 1673, the Estates had, in addition to a gift of 2.6 million livres, bought the abolition of the Chambre des domaines (which deprived some nobles of legal rights) for the same amount and acquired the royal edicts establishing new taxes, plus other expenses for the royal power, for the huge sum of 6.3 million livres. A year later, the same edicts were restored, without consulting the Estates. Also, through the Parliament of Brittany, Louis XIV registered tax on stamped paper in August 1673, and the tobacco tax in November 1674, in defiance of "Breton liberties", as Bretons at the time called their privileges under the Treaty of Union.

The new charges involved more expense for small farmers and townspeople compared to the privileged classes, and implied an introduction of gabelle. All this created a broad front of discontent against the unprecedented brutality of the central State.

== In popular culture ==
- Victor Hugo referred to the Revolt of the papier timbré in Les Contemplations and particularly in his poem Écrit en 1846 (Written in 1846), where he defended the French Revolution. He attacked, in a roundabout way, the royal massacres by mentioning Madame de Sévigné and her friend, the Duke of Chaulnes. He declared there :

French Text	English Translation
Pas plus que Sévigné, la marquise lettrée, Ne s’étonnait de voir, douce femme rêvant, Blêmir au clair de lune et trembler dans le vent, Aux arbres du chemin, parmi les feuilles jaunes, Les paysans pendus par ce bon duc de Chaulnes, Vous ne preniez souci des manants qu’on abat Par la force, et du pauvre écrasé sous le bât.	No more than Sévigné, the educated marquess, Wasn't surprised to see, sweet dreaming woman, To whiten in the moonlight and tremble in the wind, On the trees of the road, among the yellow leaves, The peasants hanged by that good Duke of Chaulnes, You didn't care about the peasants slaughtered By force, and of the poor crushed under the packsaddle.

- In the 1970s, the revolt was presented as a step in the Breton people's struggle for emancipation - Paol Keineg's 1975 play Le Printemps des Bonnets rouges portrayed it in this 'regionalist' way, and the French Communist Party celebrated the tercentary of the revolt in Carhaix with a festival.
- In December 2005, the prefect of Finistère refused to install a tourist information panel in Carhaix beside the route nationale, showing an insurgent in the revolt.
- One of the beers of the Brasserie Lancelot is called Révolte des Bonnets rouges.
- The bulletin of the Frankiz Breizh political movement is entitled Les Bonnets rouges.
- In late 2013, a protest movement centered in Brittany and also calling itself Bonnets Rouges protested against a new tax on truck transport by destroying hundreds of radar outposts that were to be used to enforce the tax.

== See also ==
- Jacquerie

== Notes ==
=== Bibliography ===
- Collins, James B. (2006). La Bretagne dans l'État Royal: Classes Sociales, États Provinciaux et Ordre Public de l'Édit d'Union à la Révolte des Bonnets Rouges (in French). Presses Universitaires de Rennes. ISBN 2-7535-0233-1.
- Cornette, Joël (2005). Histoire de la Bretagne et des Bretons (in French). Vol. 1. Paris: Seuil.
- Croix, Alain (1981). La Bretagne aux XVIe et XVIIe siècles: la vie, la mort, la foi (in French). Paris: Maloine.
- Croix, Alain (2000). "Bonnets rouges". In Alain Croix & Jean-Yves Veillard (ed.). Dictionnaire du patrimoine breton (in French). Éditions Apogée.
- Delumeau, Jean (2000) [1969]. Histoire de la Bretagne (in French). Toulouse: Éditions Privat.
- Depping, Georges-Bernard (1850). Correspondance administrative sous le règne de Louis XIV (in French). Vol. 1. Paris: Imprimerie Nationale.
- Er Ber, Léon; et al. (1910). Istoér Breih pe hanes er Vretoned (in Breton). Lorient: Dihunamb.
- Garlan, Yves; Nières, Claude (1975). Les Révoltes bretonnes de 1675 (in French). Paris: Éditions Sociales.
- Gross, David M. (2014). 99 Tactics of Successful Tax Resistance Campaigns. Picket Line Press. ISBN 9781490572741.
- Meyer, J.; Dupuy, R. (1975). "Bonnets rouges et blancs bonnets". Annales de Bretagne et des pays de l'Ouest. 82 (4): 405–426. doi:10.3406/abpo.1975.2789.
