= Commissary Apostolic =

A Commissary Apostolic (Latin: Commissarius Apostolicus) is an office in the Catholic church. The Pope appoints commissaries as delegates for judicial and executive matters.

== Notable commissaries ==
In the early 5th century, Pope Celestine I appointed Cyril of Alexandria as Commissary Apostolic, in order to judge Nestorius in the Pope's name.

Cardinal Wolsey and Cardinal Campeggio were appointed Commissaries Apostolic for the divorce case of Henry VIII of England.

Various Roman congregations are presided over by commissaries appointed on a permanent basis.

== Authority ==
The full extent of the authority of commissaries apostolic must be learnt from the diploma of their appointment. The usual powers which they possess, however, are defined in the common law of the Church. Commissaries can be empowered not only for judicial but also for executive purposes. When a papal commission mentions explicitly certain persons and certain things as subject to the authority of a commissary, and then adds in general that "other persons and other things" (quidam alii et res aliœ) are also included, it is understood that the latter phrase refers only to persons and things of equal or lower importance than those that are expressly named, and under no circumstances can the commissary's power extend to what is higher or more dignified (Cap. xv, de rescript.). If a bishop be appointed commissary Apostolic in matters that already belong to his ordinary (mainly diocesan) jurisdiction, he does not thereby receive a delegated jurisdiction superadded to that which he already possessed; such an Apostolic commission is said to 'excite', not to alter, his ordinary jurisdiction.

As a Commissary Apostolic is a delegate of the Holy See, an appeal may be made to the Pope against his judgments or administrative acts.

When several commissaries have been appointed for the same case, they are to act together as one; but if, owing to death or any other cause, one or other of the commissaries should be hindered from acting, the remaining members have full power to execute their commission. In case the commissaries be two in number and they disagree in the judgment to be given, the matter must be decided by the Holy See.

A commissary Apostolic has the power to subdelegate another person for the cause committed to him, unless it has been expressly stated in his diploma that, owing to the importance of the matter at issue, he is to exercise jurisdiction personally.

== Candidates ==
By the plenitude of his power, the Pope can constitute a layman commissary Apostolic for ecclesiastical affairs, but according to the common canon law only prelates or clerics of the major orders should receive such a commission (Lib. Sext., c. II, de rescr., 1, 3). The Council of Trent (Sess. XXV, c. xvi, de Ref.) prescribes that each bishop should transmit to the Holy See the names of four persons capable of receiving such delegation for his diocese. It has consequently become customary for the Pope to choose commissaries Apostolic from the locality where they are to investigate or pass judgment or execute a mandate.
