= Louis Auguste d'Albert, 4th Duke of Chaulnes =

French noble (1676–1744)

Louis Auguste d'Albert
- 4th Duke of Chaulnes
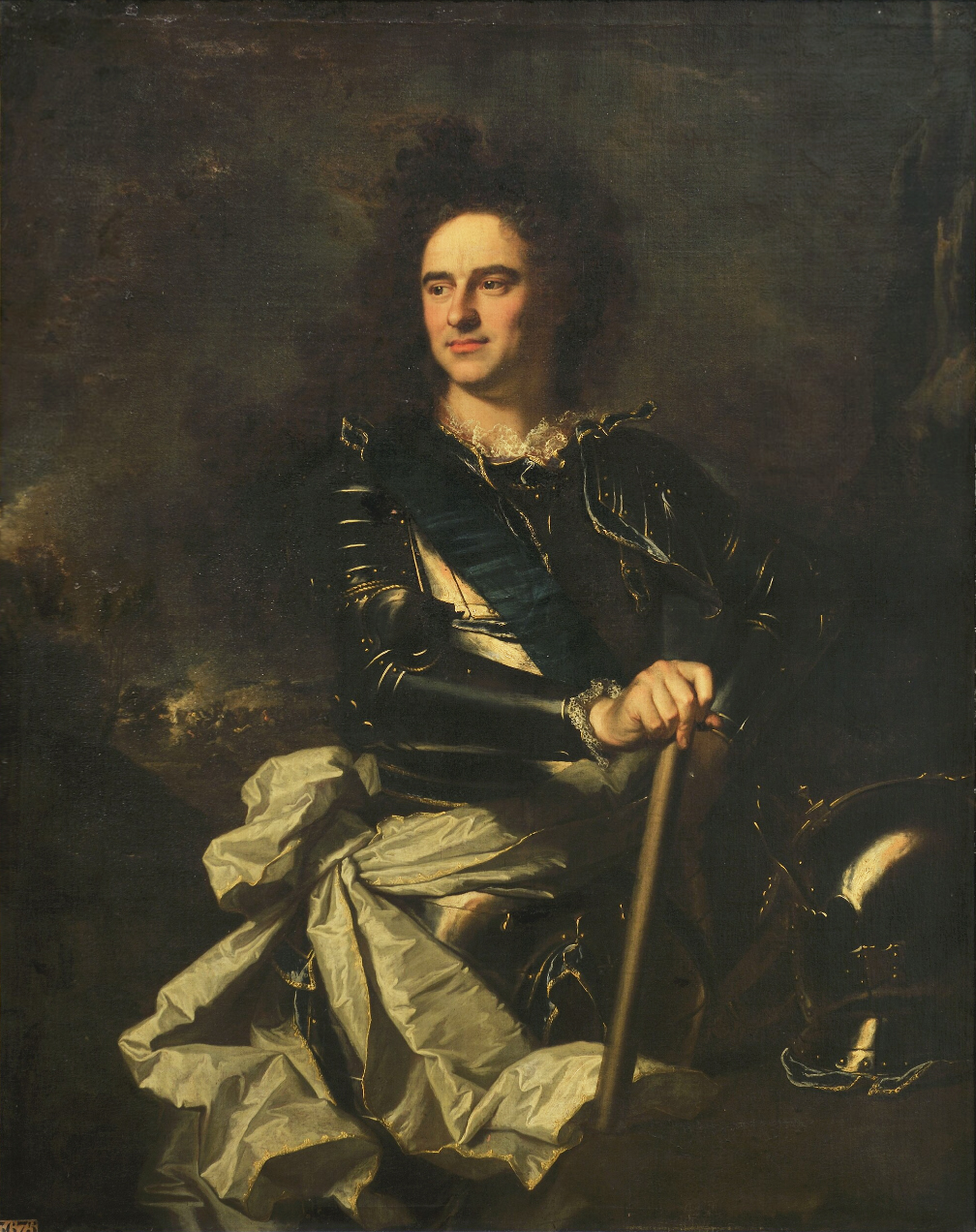
- The Duke of Chaulnes in 1707 by Rigaud.

- Coat of arms
- Full name: Louis Auguste d'Albert
- Born: 22 December 1676; Saint Germain en Laye, France
- Died: 9 November 1744 (aged 67); Paris, France
- Spouse: Marie Anne Romaine
- Issue: Louis Marie, Vidame of Amiens; Charles François, Duke of Picquigny; Michel Ferdinand, 5th Duke of Chaulnes; Marie-Thérèse, Marquise of Plessis Bellière
- Father: Charles Honoré d'Albert
- Mother: Jeanne Marie Colbert

Louis Auguste d'Albert, 4th Duke of Chaulnes (2 December 1676 - 9 November 1744) was a French nobleman and Peer and 4th Duke of Chaulnes. He was created a Marshal of France in 1741 by King Louis XV. He was the subject of a 1707 portrait by Hyacinthe Rigaud.

== Marriage ==
On 22 January 1704, he married Marie Anne Romaine in the Church of Notre-Dame, Versailles. They had seven children.

== Children ==
1. Louis Marie d'Albert (31 Julie 1705 - 23 November 1724), Vidame of Amiens had no children.
2. Charles François d'Albert (6 September 1707 - 14 July 1731), Count, then Duke of Picquigny and lieutenant. Married 1729, one daughter.
3. Louis Joseph d'Albert (1713-1714)
4. Michel Ferdinand d'Albert, 5th Duke of Chaulnes (1714-1769) married twice and had children.
5. Marie Thérèse d'Albert (10 February 1709 11 - July 1765) married Louis de Rougé, Marquis of Plessis Bellière.
6. Marie Françoise de Sales d'Albert (4 August 1710 - 14 January 1749) nun at the Benedictine convent of Montargis.
7. Marie Thérèse d'Albert (1711 - 1714) died in infancy.

== Arms ==
- De gueules diapré de deux branches d'alisier d'argent recourbées et passées en sautoir, au chef échiqueté d'azur et d'argent de trois tires (qui est d'Ailly moderne), avec en cœur, entre les branches d'alisier, un écusson d'or, au lion de gueules armé et couronné du champ (qui est d'Albert)
