= Commissary =

Someone delegated by a superior to execute a duty or an office

A commissary is a government official charged with oversight or an ecclesiastical official who exercises in special circumstances the jurisdiction of a bishop. In many countries, the term is used as an administrative or police title. It often corresponds to the command of a police station, which is then known as a "commissariat". In some armed forces, commissaries are officials charged with overseeing the purchase and delivery of supplies, and they have powers of administrative and financial oversight. Then, the "commissariat" is the organization associated with the corps of commissaries. By extension, the term "commissary" came to be used for the building where supplies were disbursed.

In some countries, both roles are used; for example, France uses "police commissaries" (commissaires de police) in the French National Police and "armed forces commissaries" (commissaires des armées) in the French armed forces.

The equivalent terms are commissaire in French, commissario in Italian, Kommissar in Standard German, Kommissär in Swiss German and Luxembourgish, comisario in Spanish, commissaris in Dutch and Flemish, komisario in Finnish, komisarz in Polish and comissário in Portuguese. In many instances these words may also be the equivalent to commissioner, depending on the context.

== Etymology ==
The word is recorded in English since 1362, for "one to whom special duty is entrusted by a higher power". This Anglo-French word derives from Medieval Latin commissarius, from Latin commissus (pp. of committere) "entrusted".

== Examples ==
=== Government and administration ===
Governmental or administrative structures (or bodies) headed by a commissary (or composed of several commissaries) are often referred to as commissary governments or commissary administrations. Such terms were often used during the colonial era, and it was also used to designate various provisional governments of administrations. Executive or administrative body composed of several commissaries is often called Council of Commissaries or Board of Commissaries. Deputy of a commissary is styled as vice-commissary or sub-commissary.

In the Soviet Union, commissaries' powers of oversight were used for political purposes. These commissaries are often known as commissars in English.

=== Police ===
A Spanish police commissary is considered to be equal in rank to a commandant in the Spanish army.

In the French National Police, a commissaire is assigned to a commune with a population of more than 30,000. Larger communes have more than one. Paris has well over one hundred commissaires. All commissaires are graduates and can fulfill both administrative and investigative roles.

In the Romanian Police, similarly to the French National Police, the rank of comisar is equivalent to the British police rank of superintendent (see also Romanian police ranks).

=== Military ===
==== British army ====
With the establishment of an English standing army following the Restoration of the Monarchy a commissary general of musters was appointed on 20 December 1660. This officer, with the assistance of four deputies, was responsible for mustering troops by regiment and checking their names against the muster roll. These musters took place six or seven times per year (and monthly from 1687). At a muster the total number of officers and men was checked against the roll, each soldier's arms and accoutrements were inspected and each officer's rank (and record of leave) was checked against their level of pay. Only after the commissary general had certified the muster roll would the paymaster general of the forces issue pay to the regiment. In 1798 the commanding officer of each regiment, together with its regimental Paymaster, took over responsibility for the musters and the deputy commissaries were dismissed. The commissary general continued to oversee a central office of musters until 1817 when the post was abolished and its duties transferred to the Secretary at War.

The appointment of a commissary general of provisions was first made by James II in 1685 to provide for his troops encamped on Hounslow Heath. As a permanent post the appointment had lapsed by 1694, but a century later it was revived for senior officer of the Commissariat (a department of HM Treasury responsible for the procurement and issue of various stores and victuals to the army and the provision of transport). The commissariat officers were uniformed civilians, appointed by the Treasury but issued with letters of commission by the War Office; they were given rank as follows:

- Commissary general (equivalent to a brigadier general)
- Deputy commissary general (equivalent to a Lieutenant Colonel or major)
- Assistant commissary general (equivalent to a captain)
- Deputy assistant commissary general (equivalent to a lieutenant)
- Commissary clerk (equivalent to an ensign).

The department was overseen by a commissary-in-chief from 1809 to 1816, and by a commissary general in chief from 1858 to 1869.

Between 1793 and 1859 assistant commissary, commissary and (from 1810) chief commissary were (civilian) ranks in the Field Train Department of the Board of Ordnance (the field force element of the Ordnance storekeeping system).

After 1869 commissary and associated titles were used as junior officer ranks by the Control Department (military successor to both the Commissariat and the Ordnance Field Train). A split in 1875 created the Commissariat and Transport Department and the Ordnance Store Department, which used (respectively) commissary-general and commissary-general of ordnance for their senior officers (along with other commissary ranks down the chain of command). After 1880 officers of the new Army Service Corps were given full military rank, but the Army Ordnance Department retained commissary of ordnance (and Deputy and assistant Commissary of ordnance) as its junior officer ranks throughout the First World War.

=== Ecclesiastical ===
==== Anglican communion ====
The canons of the Church of England, referring to the metropolitical jurisdiction of archbishops and to the ordinary jurisdiction of diocesan bishops, states that: "Such jurisdiction is exercised by the bishop himself, or by a vicar-general, official, or other commissary to whom authority in that behalf shall have been formally committed by the bishop concerned.".

In previous centuries Bishops sometimes appointed representatives, called commissaries, to perform functions in distant portions of their dioceses. In 1684 Henry Compton, the bishop of London, resolved to use the commissary system to provide leadership for churches in the American colonies. (James Blair was an early such commissary.) Commissaries were appointed to some, but not all, of the thirteen colonies into the second half of the eighteenth century. Later, commissaries were sometimes appointed for other parts of the British Empire. The practice continues in respect of the Channel Islands which, although attached to the English diocese of Salisbury, are separate legal jurisdictions with their own canon law; the deans of Jersey and Guernsey are the bishop's commissaries in their respective islands.

In 2011 the archbishop of Canterbury appointed commissaries to conduct a visitation upon the Diocese of Chichester with regard to safeguarding failures in the diocese over many years. According to their interim report: "Our appointment by the Archbishop of Canterbury – the first such appointment of commissaries for over 100 years – is evidence of the deep concern held in the Church of England for this diocese and its failure properly to protect children in its care".

In current practice in the Church of England, the relevant archbishop appoints an episcopal commissary during a diocesan vacancy in see; that bishop (usually the senior suffragan in the diocese) is commonly called acting bishop of the diocese (e.g. acting bishop of Birmingham).

== See also ==
- Apostolic Commissary
- Commissioner
- Commissar
- Reichskommissar
