= Papier timbré =

Legal term in Ancien régime France

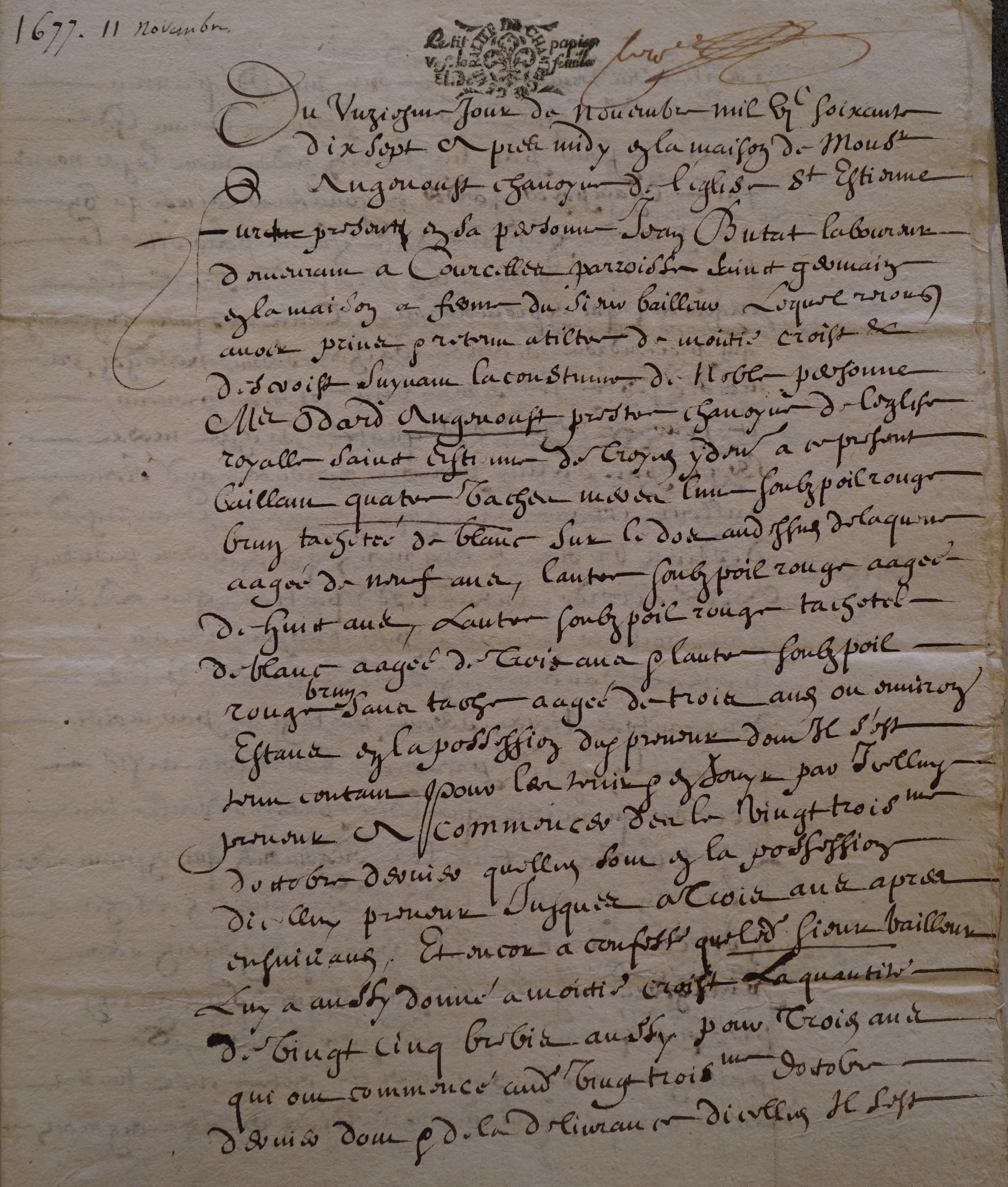
An example of papier timbré from 1677

In Ancien régime France, papier timbré (French pronunciation: [papje tɛ̃bʁe]; 'stamped paper') was paper with a special revenue stamp that was compulsory for all authentic acts (i.e., documents used in law, such as wills, sale contracts and vital records). The tax on it, known as the timbre fiscal fixe or entier fiscal (sometimes also known as the "papier timbré tax" as a metonym), was one of the two forms of the timbre fiscal (the other was the timbre fiscal mobile).

The Revolt of the papier timbré in 17th-century Brittany arose from resistance to the papier timbré tax.

== See also ==
- Stamp duty in the United Kingdom
