= Domain congéable =

Former form of contract

Domaine congéable was a type of contract between a landowner and the person exploiting it agriculturally, very common in Lower Brittany, above all in Cornouaille and Trégor. The landowner might be the following:

- bailleur (landlord), qualified as owner of lands or woodland made up of noble trees (such as beech)
- fermier (farmer), known as the domainier or colon, was the owner of buildings, ditches and embankments, as well as woodland made up of non-noble trees.

A bail or rental agreement was signed, to last nine years, on payment of a commission. The domainier (tenant) paid the foncier (owner) a fixed rent or convenancière each year at Michaelmas.
