= Philippe de Rémi (died 1265) =

French poet and trouvère (1210–1265)

Philippe de Rémi (Old French: Phelipe de Remi) (1210–1265) was an Old French poet and trouvère from Picardy, and the bailli of the Gâtinais from 1237 to at least 1249. He was also the father of Philippe de Beaumanoir, the famous jurist, by his wife Marie de Fouencamps.

== Biography ==
By 1255 Philippe was a knight (chevalier) and the sire (or seigneur) of Beaumanoir. In 1257 he served at the court of the Countess of Artois, Amicie de Courtenay, to arbitrate a dispute between the house of Haute-Avesnes and Guillaume de Hesdigneul. He remained at the court of Artois until 1259, when he retired to his estate at Remy. He died there in 1265. Besides his middle child, Philippe, he left an elder son, Girard (Gérard), who succeeded him as sire, and a daughter, Péronelle, his children by first wife, Marie. He also left behind his second wife, Alice de Bailleul, whom he had married by 1262 and who was living in 1267.

Henri Léonard Bordier first identified the poet with the jurist in 1868. In 1894 this was challenged by V. Zeidler, who argued that Jehan et Blonde was the basis for the German poem Willehalm von Orlens by Rudolf von Ems, composed in 1242. This necessitated identifying poet with bailli. This was widely discredited until 1981, when Bernard Gicquel rejuvenated the hypothesis that aspects of Willehalm were derived from Jehan and from the hastilude sequence at Ressons in La Manekine. R.-H. Bautier follows Gicquel, but revises the biography of the father slightly. According to him, Alice was Philippe's wife as early as 1252 and the younger Philippe was born between then and 1254. He suggests that Philippe's romances were composed while he was bailli and that the poems were written between 1250 and 1262 (or 1265). Jean Dufournet and Marie-Madeleine Castellani also follow Gicquel. Sylvie Lécuyer in her edition of Jehan et Blonde (Paris, 1984), refused to use "Philippe de Beaumanoir" of the author in order to avoid linking him with the jurist, his son.

== Poetry ==
Philippe wrote some 20,000 verses of poems and two romances, La Manekine and Jehan et Blonde. All of his work is preserved in B.N., f. fr. 1588, an early fourteenth-century manuscript from Amiens or Vermandois. There are eleven chansons outside of this manuscript with Alfred Jeanroy attributed to him.

Among his poem is a unique salut d'amour, one of only four such pieces with refrains, and the only one with an identified author. It begins Douce amie, salus vous mande and includes eight refrains. It has been called a salut à refrains analogous to a chanson avec des refrains.

Among Philippe's most studied works are his nonsense poems called Fatrasies and Oiseuses. His courtly love poetry has been under-studied.
