= Commissariat de l'armée de terre =

Commissariat branch of the French Army

The Commissariat de l'armée de terre (CAT) is the commissariat branch of the French Army. Its equivalent for the French Navy is the Commissariat de la Marine (SCM) and for the French Air Force the Service de l'administration générale et des finances de l'armée de l'air (SAGF) (formerly known as the commissariat de l'air) - a member of any of these three is known as a commissaire aux armées (commissioner to the armies). It now carries out the general administration and finances of France's land forces. It is led by commissaires or commissioners, officers recruited by competition among university graduates.

It has existed since at least the 14th century when King John II created posts for commissioners to prepare for war. Its direct predecessor was the corps des inspecteurs aux revues et des commissaires des Guerres or intendance militaire set up by an ordinance of Louis XVIII on 29 July 1817.

It was renamed the Commissariat de l'armée de terre in 1984 and existed under that name as the Direction centrale for the army until 1 January 2010. At that date, with the other two branches' commissariats, it was put under the Direction centrale du service du commissariat des armées.

== Organisation ==
There was formerly a central management of the office of the Army (DCCAT), based in Rambouillet, headed by a Commissioner Major General.It was incorporated into the commissariat of the armed forces, which also included regional offices, one in each region de terre and the central or decentralized. Without exception, each regiment or administrative training unit of the Army, in its administrative and financial management (DAF), has a Commissioner (and sometimes a Deputy Commissioner) (and since 1988). These functions have since 2009 gradually devolved to the directorates administrative and support rights (DASH) of the GSBdD will be generalized, numbering 51, from 1 January 2011.

There are five decentralized regional directorates:

- The regional office of the Commissariat de l'armée de terre in Northwest Region (Dircat in RTNO, Rennes;
- Northeast Directorate RTNE in Metz which included the Commissioner of the Army of Strasbourg and police of the Army of Chalons-en-Champagne;
- Southwest Directorate RTSO in Bordeaux including the Commissioner of the Army of Limoges;
- Southeast Directorate RTSE in Rillieux-la-Pape which includes the Commissioner of the Army of Lyon and land police force jn Marseille;
- Directorate Ile-de-France Saint-Germain-en-Laye including the Commissioner of the Army of Paris.

(directions marked with * were included in their respective region to earth 3, as an experiment until 1 January 2011)
