= Jean de Beaumanoir (marquis) =

French nobleman (1551–1614)

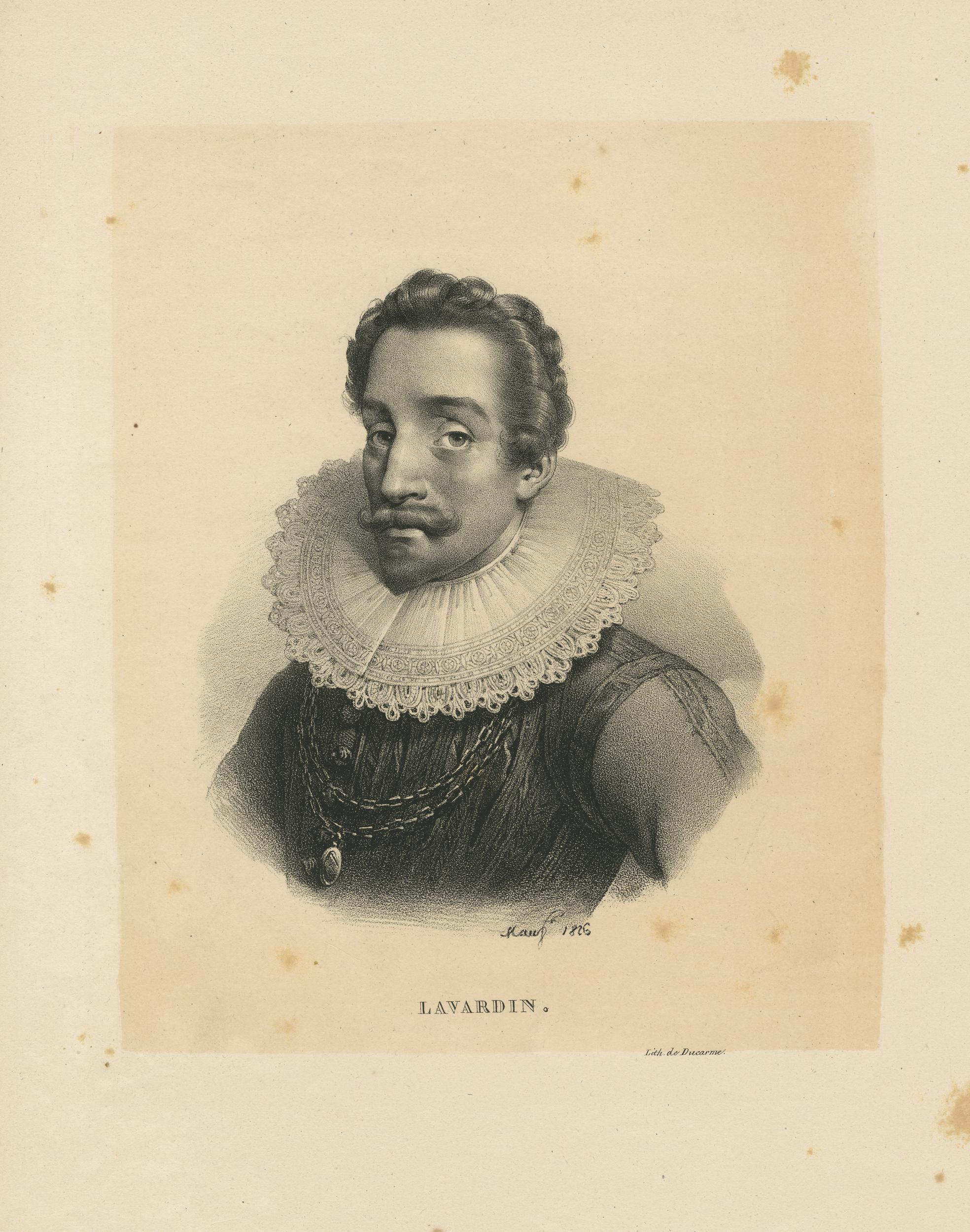
Jean de Beaumanoir

Jean De Beaumanoir (1551 – 17 November 1614), seigneur and afterwards marquis de Lavardin, count of Nègrepelisse by marriage, was a French marshal.

== Early life ==
Son of Charles de Beaumanoir, baron de Lavardin and Marguerite de Chourses.

== Career ==
De Beaumanoir served first in the Protestant army during the French Wars of Religion, but switched his support to the Catholic forces after the St. Bartholomew's Day massacre. His father was killed in the massacre, after which De Beaumanoir fought against Henry of Navarre. When Henry became king of France, Lavardin changed over to his side, and was made a marshal of France.

He was governor of Maine, commanded an army in Burgundy in 1602, was ambassador extraordinary to England in 1612, and died in Paris 1614.

== Personal life ==
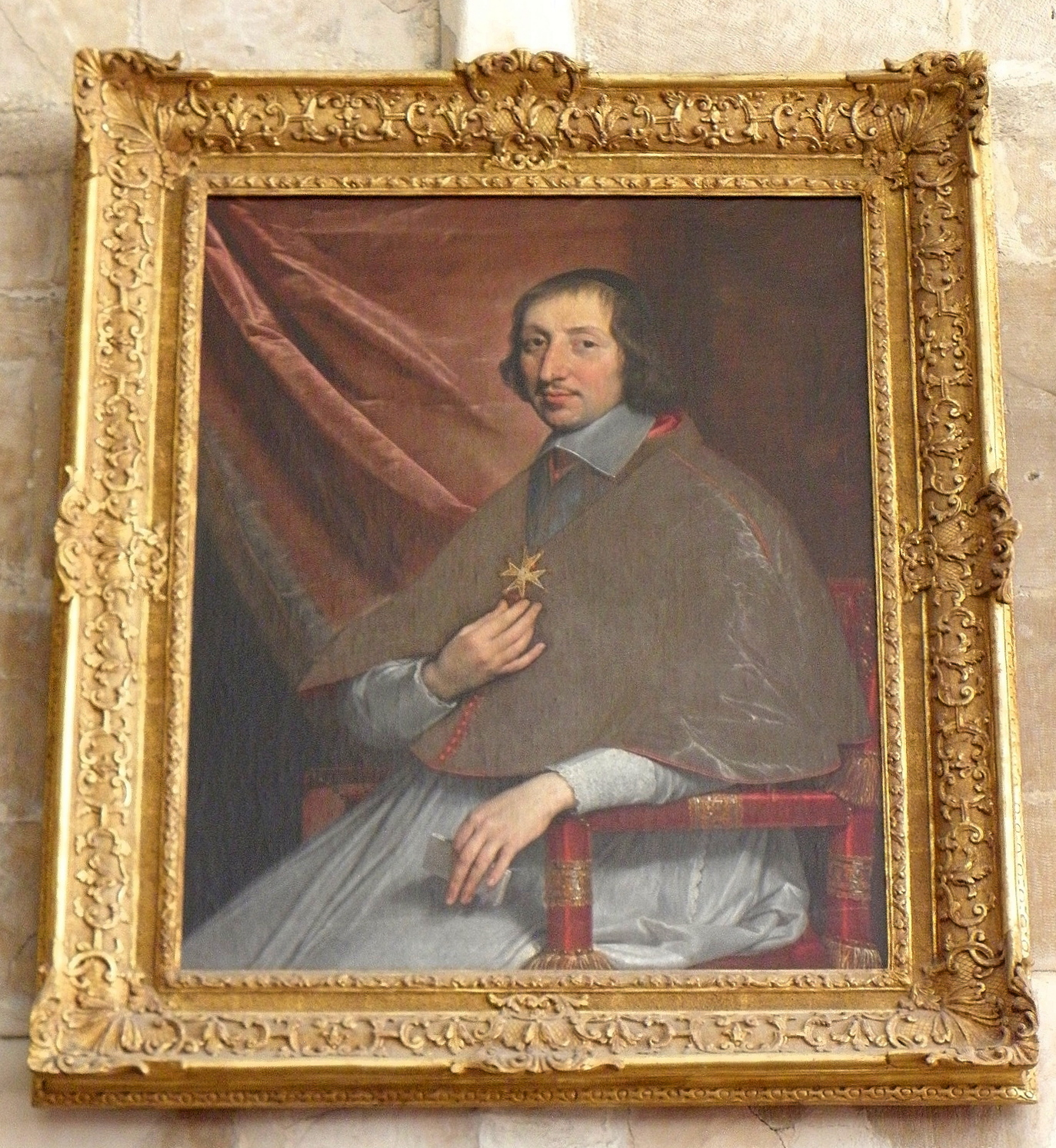
His eldest son, Charles de Beaumanoir de Lavardin, Bishop of Le Mans

De Beaumanoir married Catherine de Carmaing. Together, they were the parents of:

- Charles de Beaumanoir (1586–1637), Bishop of Le Mans.
- Henri de Beaumanoir, Marquis de Lavardin (d. 1633), who married Marguerite de La Baume, a daughter of Rostaing de la Baume, comte de Suze and sister of Louis-François de la Baume de Suze, Bishop of Viviers.

De Beaumanoir died on 17 November 1614 in Paris.

=== Descendants ===
Through his second son Henri, he was a grandfather of Madeleine de Beaumanoir; Henri de Beaumanoir, Marquis de Lavardin (d. 1644) and Philibert Emmanuel de Beaumanoir.

He was a great-grandfather of Henri Charles de Beaumanoir, Marquis de Lavardin (1643–1701), who was sent as ambassador to Rome in 1689, on the occasion of a difference between Louis XIV and Pope Innocent XI.
