= Philippe de Rémi (died 1296) =

French jurist and official (c. 1247–1296)

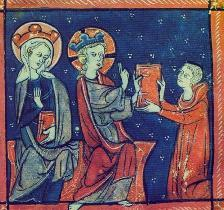

Philippe de Rémi or Philippe de Beaumanoir (c. 1247–1296), contemporarily Phelippes de Beaumanoir, was a French jurist and royal official. He was a junior son of Philippe de Rémi (d. 1265), poet and bailli of the Gâtinais, who was renowned for his 20,000 verses of poetry, including La Manekine, Jehan et Blonde, and a salut d'amour.

After studying law in Orléans and perhaps Bologna, Philippe became bailli of Clermont in the county of Beauvaisis (1279), then seneschal of Poitou (1284) and the Saintonge (1287). Afterwards, he came to hold some of the most senior administrative offices in the realm: bailli of the Vermandois (1289), the Touraine (1291), and Senlis (1292).

His administrative experience formed the basis of his principal work, the Coustumes de Beauvoisis of 1283, which was first printed in 1690. Even though barely noticed in its own time, it was later regarded as one of the best works bearing on old French customary law, and was frequently referred to with high admiration by Montesquieu, who called him la lumière de son temps ("the light of his time").

Philippe married Mabille de Boves sometime after August 1292. She survived him, but her brother, Enguerrand II of Fouencamps, was her heir.

== Sources ==
- Akehurst, F. R. P. (March 1992). The Coutumes de Beauvaisis of Philippe de Beaumanoir. University of Pennsylvania Press. p. 749. ISBN 0-8122-3105-8.
- Chisholm, Hugh, ed. (1911). "Beaumanoir, Philippe de Rémi, Sire de" . Encyclopædia Britannica (11th ed.). Cambridge University Press.
- Groupe d'étude des monuments et œuvres d'art de l'Oise et du Beauvaisis (1983). Colloque scientifique international organisé pour la commémoration du VIIe centenaire des "Coutumes et usages du Beauvaisis" de Philippe de Beaumanoir. Beauvais: GEMOB. p. 136.
- Heller, Sarah-Grace; Reichert, Michelle (November 2001). Essays on the Poetic and Legal Writings of Philippe De Remy and His Son Phiilippe De Beaumanoir of Thirteenth-Century France. Edwin Mellen Press. p. 304. ISBN 0-7734-7383-1.
- Montazel, Laurence (2001). "Philippe de Beaumanoir". In Michael Stolleis (ed.). Juristen: ein biographisches Lexikon; von der Antike bis zum 20. Jahrhundert (in German) (2nd ed.). München: Beck. p. 71. ISBN 3-406-45957-9.
- Middleton, Roger (1999). "The History of Paris BNF Fr. 1588". In Barbara N. Sargent-Baur (ed.). Le Roman de la Manekine: Edited from Paris BNF fr. 1588 and Translated. Brill. pp. 41–68.
