= Second French War of Religion (1567–1568) =

French religious civil war 1567–8

- Part of the French Wars of Religion
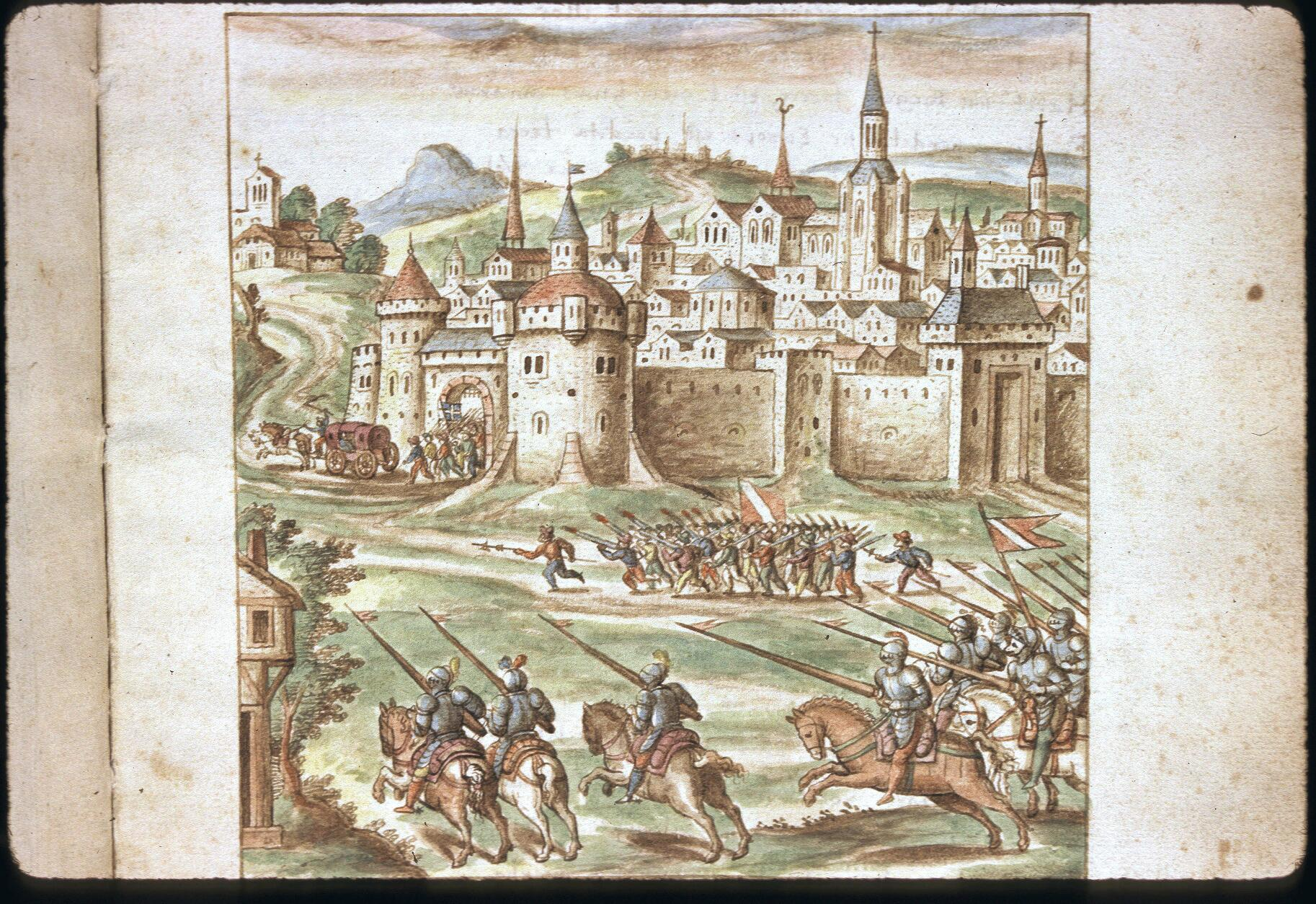
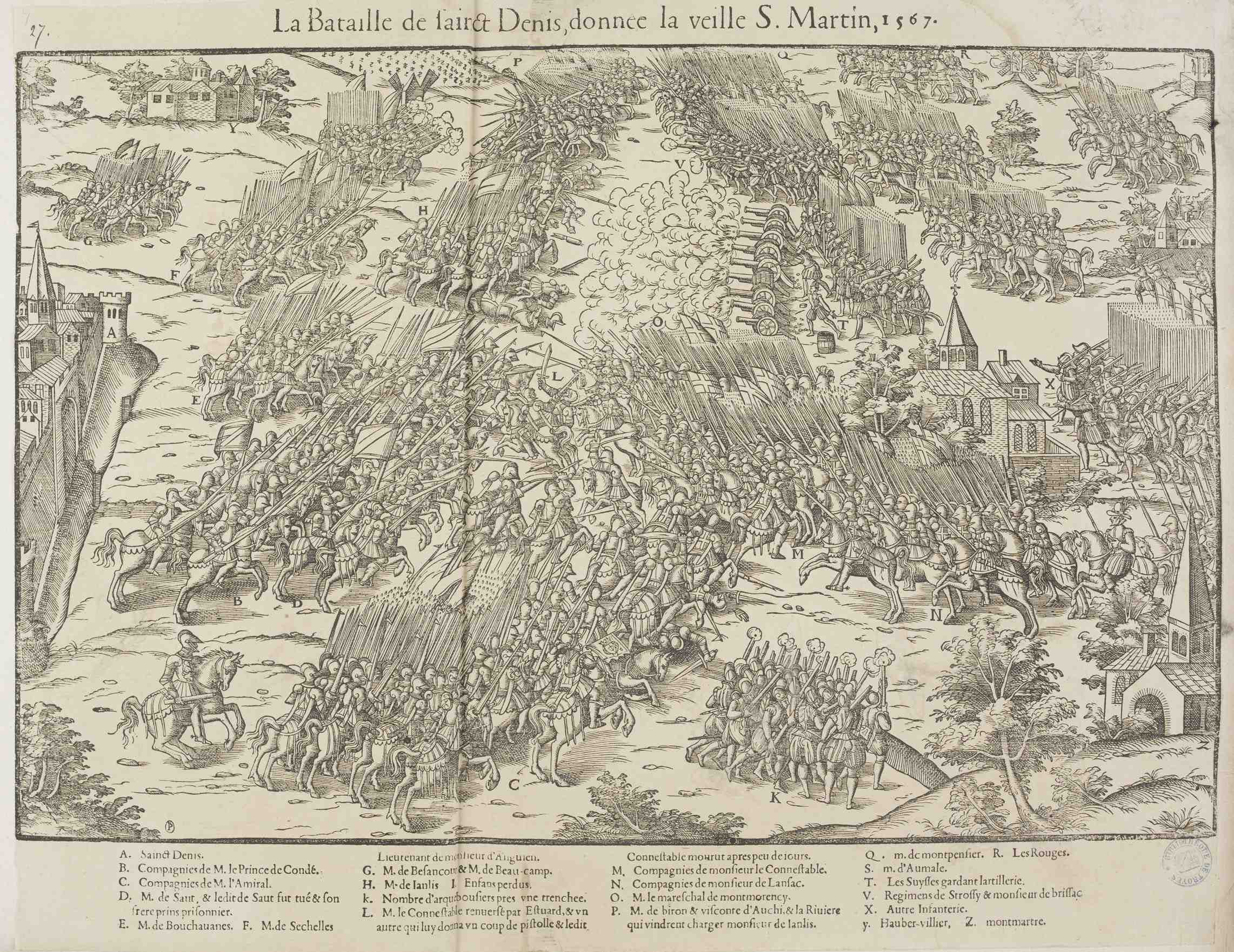
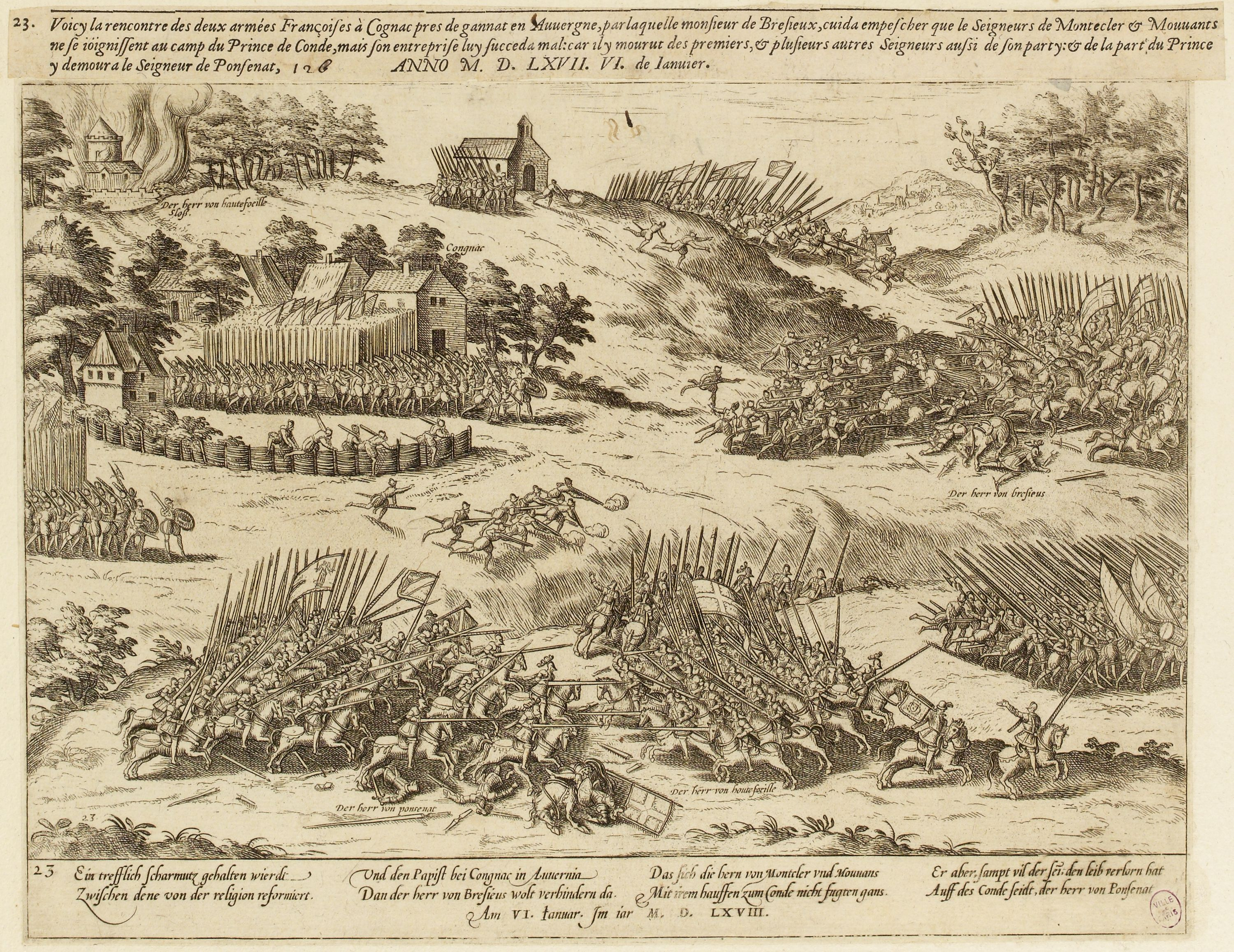
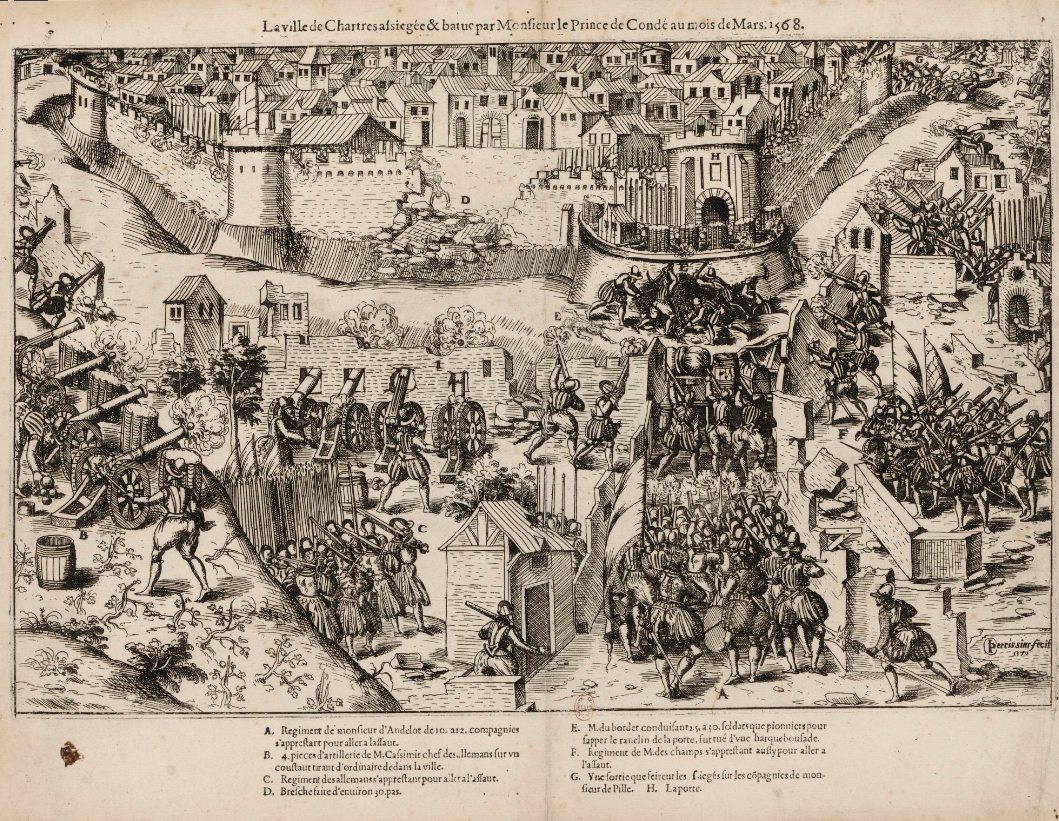
- Left to right: Surprise of Meaux, attempted Protestant seizure of king Charles IX; Battle of Saint-Denis, the principal battle of the war, in which the Protestants were defeated; Battle of Cognat in which the southern army of the vicomtes defeated a royal force sent to intercept them; Siege of Chartres, the Protestant attempt to capture the rich royal city shortly before the making of peace
Date	26 September 1567 – 23 March 1568
Location	Kingdom of France
Result	Negotiated settlements: Edict of Longjumeau

Belligerents
Protestants: French Protestants Electoral Palatinate	Royalists: France Spain Papal States Savoy Saxony	Unaligned Protestants House of Albret

Commanders and leaders
Prince de Condé; Admiral de Coligny; Seigneur d'Andelot; Comte de La Rochefoucauld; Comte de Montgommery; Seigneur de Genlis; Seigneur de Mauvans; Baron d'Acier; Seigneur de Montbrun; Seigneur de Poncenat †; John Casimir	Constable de Montmorency (DOW); Duc d'Orléans; Duc de Nemours; Duc de Montpensier; Maréchal de Cossé; Duc d'Aumale; Seigneur de Monluc; Seigneur de Tavannes; Comte de Brissac; Seigneur de Strozzi; Vicomte de Joyeuse; Baron de Terride; Baron de Biron; Count of Arenberg; Ludwig Pfyffer; Count Rhinegrave; Marquis of Baden-Baden	Queen of Navarre; Comte de Gramont

Strength
Main Protestant army at peak strength: 30,000+ Of which: Electoral Palatinate: 9,500	Main royal army at peak strength: 72,000; Of Which: Swiss Confederacy 10,000; Spain: 2,000 (1,600 Heavy Cavalry 400 Light Cavalry); Savoy: 1,000	Unknown
- Unknown

The Second French War of Religion (26 September 1567 – 23 March 1568) was the second of the French Wars of Religion, civil wars between French Protestants and Catholics which divided the kingdom of France between 1562 and 1598. After four years of peace, the Protestant nobility, led by the prince de Condé and admiral de Coligny resolved to enter rebellion in September. In the prior months, tensions had raised in the kingdom over the hiring of mercenaries by the French crown to protect the border while the Spanish sent an army along the border to crush a revolt in the Spanish Netherlands. The French Protestant leadership believed (among other grievances) that the forces might be turned against them.

At the Surprise of Meaux they attempted to capture king Charles IX of France and the royal court, chief among which the young King's mother Catherine de' Medici. This attempt failed, and the King was able to reach Paris. The Protestants settled in for a siege of the capital but lacked the strength for it to be effective. The defence of the city was led by the constable de Montmorency, who on 11 November, conducted a sortie from the capital and fought the Protestants at the battle of Saint-Denis. During the battle, the royalists would hold the field, though the constable de Montmorency was killed. In his absence, royal command fell to Charles IX's younger brother, the sixteen-year-old duc d'Anjou (duke of Anjou). Anjou, set out in pursuit of the Protestant army as it fled eastwards towards the border with the Holy Roman Empire, but failed to bring it to battle, thereby allowing the Protestants to unite with the German mercenaries they had hired under the command of John Casimir.

The Protestants then turned around and re-entered France, making for the heart of the kingdom. As they progressed, they were shadowed by the royal army under the duc d'Anjou. The Protestant force set itself up before the city of Chartres, and put the city to siege in late February. By this time, both the Protestants and the royalists were desperately short on money, incentivising a push for peace. The Protestants would fail to take Chartres.

Throughout the course of the war, peace talks had been conducted between Catherine and the Protestant leadership. The French crown at first looked to see the Protestants surrender and put themselves at the mercy of Charles, but as the conflict progressed, and the financial situation got more desperate, they consented to more concessions. Finally, in March 1568, a peace agreement was reached by which the edict of Amboise, which had brought the first war to a close in 1563, was reinstated minus subsequent modifications, and the crown would pay off the Protestant mercenaries. The peace would last less than a year, before civil war resumed in the Autumn.

== Rebellion in the Netherlands ==
In the summer of 1566, a wave of iconoclastic riots swept the Spanish Netherlands. The Spanish king Philip resolved to send an army north to restore order. This army was to travel overland along France's eastern frontier under the command of the duke of Alba. Fears of this army were compounded with the knowledge of the recent hiring of Swiss mercenaries by the French crown to supplement the royal guard. The Protestants therefore imagined that Alba's army might be diverted into France, where it would crush them in conjunction with the French crown.

The historian Constant describes the Protestant fears as 'largely false'. The historian Shimizu ridicules the notion of a combined royal-Spanish anti-Protestant offensive, highlighting that the situation in the Netherlands was too complicated for Alba to resolve in short order, that it would not have been possible for sufficient aid to be provided to the extermination of the French Protestants without losing the Netherlands, and that Philip had just begun a domestic campaign against the Moriscos (Christian converts from Islam).

Nevertheless, in Paris, the Spanish ambassador Francès de Álava exhorted the queen mother Catherine to follow the Spanish example in dealing with the Protestants of France and chastised her for her policy of toleration. The French king Charles IX was more sympathetic to these exhortations, being of the opinion he must instil obedience in the Protestants.

== Surprise of Meaux ==
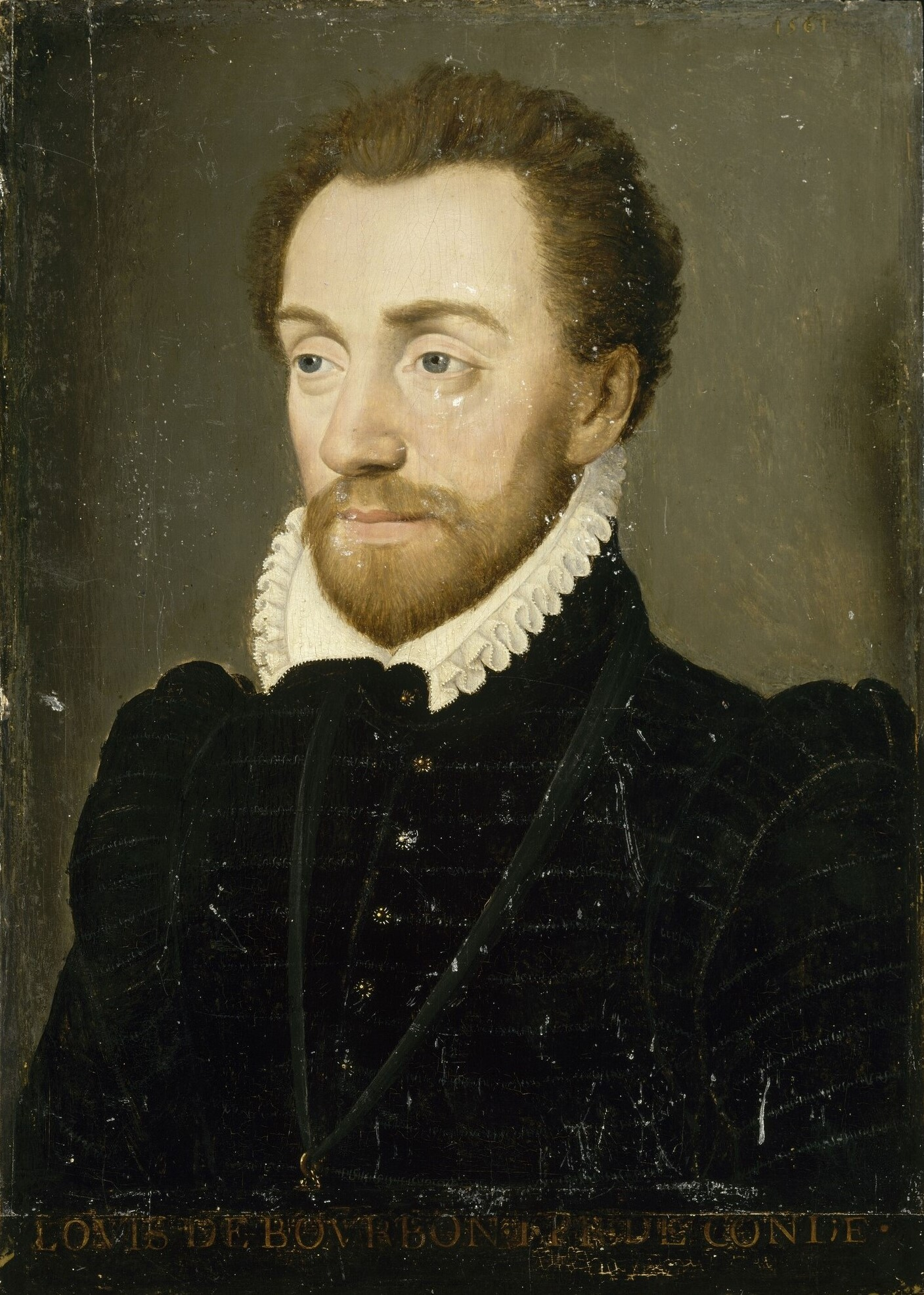
Prince de Condé leader of the rebel Protestant nobility during the Second French War of Religion

=== Châtillon-sur-Loing ===
Several meetings were held among the Protestant aristocratic leadership, all of whom attended with the exception of the seigneur de Soubise (lord of Soubise) and prince de Porcien. These meetings transpired at the château de Vallery, a property belonging to the prince de Condé, and Châtillon-sur-Loing, a property of the admiral de Coligny. The first of these meetings took place at Châtillon-sur-Loing, sometime in mid-July 1567 (definitely before 19 July, placed on 12 July by the contemporary diarist Claude Haton) on the initiative of the admiral de Coligny. In attendance, the Admiral; the prince de Condé; Coligny's brothers the cardinal de Châtillon and the seigneur d'Andelot; the comte de Montgommery; the comte de La Rochefoucauld; the seigneur de Téligny; seigneur de Mouy; and the seigneur de La Noue among other gentlemen. Beyond these grandees, Protestant pastors were also present.

The historian Kingdon argues that in contrast with the first civil war several years prior, there is no evidence to be found that the pastors played an important role in the decision by the Protestant leadership to enter rebellion. The meeting was, according to Haton, camouflaged under the pretext of a banquet. According to La Noue who was present, it was the Admiral who took on the position of the cool head, advising the assembled against confrontation with the French crown, while most of the others were in favour of assuming arms. For those against war, the risk of driving the King into the arms of their enemies and galvanising anti-Protestant action was a concern. Condé was part of the war camp, he argued that the Spanish queen Élisabeth was pregnant, and the birth of a child was going to strengthen the bonds between the French and Spanish crowns and that Catherine and the cardinal de Lorraine were soon to imitate the example of the duke of Alba in the Netherlands by arresting both him and Coligny. Coligny was for a while able to succeed in convincing the gathered nobles of the dangers of rebellion as he counselled patience. For him, before seeking the solution of a coup, all avenues of negotiation should be exhausted.

While the Protestants were meeting at Châtillon-Coligny, they had with them a host of 1,200 to 1,500 horsemen. Catherine was aware of this great host having met there, but put little weight in it. The son of the constable de Montmorency, the seigneur de Thoré, was sent to Châtillon to enquire of the affair. Thoré delivered a memorandum to Coligny, which does not survive but has been inferred to have contained a mixture of concern and reproach. Coligny's response survives. In this response, Coligny assured Thoré that he was not preparing to lead a Protestant uprising. His past conduct was a testament to his good intentions. As for the Protestant suspicions of the crown, these were well founded. Charles refused to dismiss the Swiss guard he had raised even though the duke of Alba had now passed up into the Netherlands.

Upon learning that the 6,000 Swiss soldiers were to come to Paris, fears of betrayal were enlivened again in the Protestant camp. The historian Daussy dismisses the validity of this particular Protestant fear, arguing that the transfer of the mercenaries to Paris was rather so that the King could see them, the Swiss still being in their pre-paid service period.

=== Vallery ===
A second meeting transpired, this one at the château de Vallery a little before 15 August. The debate that transpired at this meeting is unknown, the contemporary Aubigné states that the Admiral again played the role of the cooling voice. Daussy speculates that Condé and Coligny may have been entrusted with delivering a protest to the King. They would therefore make a brief trip to the court, but without result.

Then, according to the historian Crété, Coligny is to have learned of a plot by which he and Condé were seized, with the one killed and the other thrown in prison. The Swiss would fan out between Paris, Orléans and Poitiers and then the edict of Amboise would be annulled. Champion states that it was Condé who learned of this secret royal plot, through a letter communicated to him by a member of the court. The English ambassador Norris reported that, under pressure from the cardinal de Lorraine, the edict of Amboise (the toleration edict that brought the first civil war to a close and permitted the practice of limited Protestantism in France) was to be revoked, the Tridentine decrees (outcomes of the ecumenical council which reformed Catholicism) imposed and Protestantism outlawed on pain of death. This related to the supposed secret meetings that had transpired while Charles was in Picardy at the end of August. Champion reports that the Protestant's saw the shadowy hand of pope Pius V working to drive Charles towards the destruction of French Protestantism.

By letters of 23 August, Norris reported that the cardinal de Lorraine was in the process of appointing centurions in Paris and other large cities to inspect the houses of Protestant seigneurs, looking for violations of the numbers permitted to attend Protestant worship therein. In Norris' estimation, the cardinal de Lorraine enjoyed great royal favour at this moment.

=== Return to Vallery ===
According to Daussy, it was likely the failure of the mission to the court that inspired the third meeting.

Condé summoned the Protestant leaders to Vallery for a meeting that may have been on 10 September. The time for patience had passed. D'Andelot made a passionate speech for rebellion. According to La Noue, he argued that to do nothing was to wait for their own executions, that the foreign enemy was already on the march seeking to avenge the injury of the 1562 battle of Dreux (where many Swiss soldiers had been killed), and defensive Protestant actions. Further, that 3,000 Protestants had been killed since the coming of peace without any justice for the crimes being delivered by the crown. The assembled knew the risks of this plan, that it could be taken as an attack against the king himself. Andelot analogised it rather to the fight of king Charles VII in the fifteenth-century. He had assumed arms, not to crush his father or hurt France, but in the greater interest of the French nation. Andelot's appeal was one of courage rather than prudence, and he carried the assembled before him. His cautious brother Coligny endorsed this proposal. The conversation then turned to the practicalities of the uprising. Lessons had been learned from the first civil war. According to La Noue, they would focus on the capture of a more limited number of key cities (Troyes, Toulouse, Lyon) that were highly defensible. This would better allow for their maintenance than a vast number of places, which during the first civil war they had been unable to relieve when they had been threatened with siege. Having assembled a powerful and coherent army they would destroy the Swiss mercenaries in the crown's employ, and drive from the French court the cardinal de Lorraine. A new royal council could be established at which the Protestant nobility would enjoy a preponderance of power. Once in such a strong position, they could extract religious toleration. A petition could be presented to Charles, and freed of his malfeasant advisors he would truly understand their situation.

Constant argues that it was at Vallery that the plan to kidnap Charles and Catherine was agreed upon. Once the king was freed of the influence of the Lorraine-Guise family, Charles could then mete out punishment to the arrested Guise. Jouanna characterises this plot as a re-run of the 1560 Conspiracy of Amboise, the main difference being, only one of the two enemies of the Amboise conspirators was still standing, the cardinal de Lorraine. The seigneur de Soubise had emphasised the importance of possession of the King back in 1565. Sutherland compares the coup de main by which the royal family would be captured with the Catholic Triumvirate's seizure of the royal family in 1562. She notes that in contrast to this effort, the Triumvirate could claim to be operating under legal authority, enjoying the participation of the lieutenant-general of the kingdom, nor was their operation a military one. Miquel argues Coligny intended the capture of the king to be quite different to that attempted at Amboise in 1560, undertaken professionally, and with the Estates General quickly called after the capture. Constant explains the motivation of the coup as to remove the young Charles from the reach and influence of his nefarious mother Catherine, and the cardinal de Lorraine. Jouanna, in considering the motivation of Condé and the other Protestant leaders to enter revolt argues that we cannot solely look to religious drivers. Political considerations played a role in the high noble decision making. She contrasts this with the wider Protestant movement which she argues assumed arms in the hope of destroying the Catholic church and seizing the cities of the kingdom for their worship.

The contemporary Catholic memoirist Claude Haton claimed that the admiral de Coligny induced the prince de Condé to seek the French crown. Shimizu dismisses the totalising role this gives Coligny over the Protestant party. Haton as a partisan Catholic had little insight into the interiority of Protestant decision making. By letter of 17 December to Philip II, Álava reported that the prince de Condé wanted to kill the seigneur de Lanssac as the latter had reported to Charles that Condé had signed himself as Louis XIII. Brunet sees this anecdote from Álava as supporting evidence that the Protestants were so confident of victory in their Meaux surprise, that they had struck coins by which the profile of the prince de Condé was displayed as Louis XIII. He notes that Protestant historians dispute the accuracy of this.

It was agreed that they would follow Condé's suggested location of Rozay-en-Brie for an armed meeting which would transpire at the end of September. Orders went out to gather here but individually, not arriving as a great host so as to maintain a lower profile. These orders were distributed through the Protestant church system in France. The Protestant soldiers, primarily from the west and east of the kingdom, made the journey by day and night in small groups, avoiding the main roads. As the nobles made their way to Rozay, they stayed in the châteaux and in provisioned barns. This did not attract attention as nobles of status were accustomed to travelling with armed retinues in this period. Rozay was seized by the Protestants on 24 September, with Condé, Coligny, Andelot and La Rochefoucauld among the leadership in the town.

Having learned of the plan Condé intended to undertake, the queen of Navarre maintained herself aloof from involvement, feeling the Protestant church in the south-west was too vulnerable to risk in a contest of arms. In addition to personally abstaining, she stopped her nobles from involving themselves in his enterprise.

=== Warning signs ===
During August, the bishop of Orléans, who had been in the Spanish Netherlands to give his complements to the duke of Alba and duchess of Parma on their appointments, Alba having been made governor of the Netherlands. On route back to the French court, he became aware of the Protestant plot to capture the King and quickly alerted the crown.

The chancellor L'Hôpital attempted to salvage the peace at this eleventh hour. He urged Charles to make concessions to the Protestants.

As early as 4 September, Catherine wrote to the maréchal de Cossé (marshal of Cossé, Marshal being the senior military office of the kingdom of France, subordinate only to the Constable) to investigate the veracity of rumours of a gathering of between 1,200 and 1,500 horsemen around Montargis and Châtillon. She nevertheless asserted she did not believe these rumours. Wanegffelen summarises her disposition as being one that could not conceive of another Protestant uprising.

At some point, spies were dispatched to Châtillon by Catherine. Arriving in Coligny's domain, they saw the admiral dressed in peasant's clothes, attention focused on preparations for the upcoming harvest. This was a disarming display to report back. Decrue states that it was one of the sons of the constable de Montmorency, the seigneur de Thoré, who came to meet with Coligny, and saw this episode.

On 10 September, Catherine declared herself to be satisfied by the maréchal de Cossé's investigation and was assured that Cossé would maintain a key eye over his governate of Anjou to be assured such troubles would not emerge. Indeed, her concerns lay primarily with the Catholics as likely disruptors of the peace, and on 11 September she wrote to Paris to caution the city against the commitment of any outrages.

Around 11 September, the seigneur de Mauvissière was despatched to Condé to determine why he had assembled such a large force around his person. According to the English ambassador, Condé is to have explained that he was committed to maintain the Protestant faith, which the King was attempting to suppress.

Around this time, Paris had gone into a lockdown for fear of some Protestant attack, with foreigners expelled, gates closed, and guard bolstered. Charles, who had been at La Fère in Picardy turned to face the capital but it quickly became apparent it was a false alarm, and the king returned to La Fère.

Catherine wrote to her ambassador in Spain, the baron de Fourquevaux on 18 September. In this communique she noted that there had been a baseless rumour of a Protestant enterprise. If the thought was on their minds, with the news from Flanders reaching them, it did not develop beyond that.

From La Fère the court made for the châteaux de Montceaux-lès-Meaux where they hoped to spend a little while before moving on to Meaux for the feast of Saint-Michel on 29 September.

While at the château de Montceaux-lès-Meaux, troubling word reached the court in the form of the seigneur de Mauvissière, who had just returned from Spanish Flanders where he had been sent to offer the king's compliments to the duchess of Parma and the duke of Alba. He stated that he had become aware of a Protestant plan to seize the king and the greater royal family, which had been confided to him by several Protestant travelling companions with whom he had made the return journey from the Netherlands. By this time, four-hundred Protestant horsemen had already arrived in the area. He first confided these reports in a private interview with Catherine and the king where he was little believed. They then bid him address the same story to the constable de Montmorency, the duc de Nemours, the duc de Guise and the Chancellor. The constable de Montmorency derided the weakness of the Protestants, noting that if there was an amassing of a Protestant force underway, he would be aware of it. The chancellor de L'Hôpital chided the messenger for spreading rumours that risked the standing of the kingdom's peace. For L'Hôpital such false fearmongering was a capital offence.

Around this time, the Papal nuncio, cardinal Santa Croce arrived at court to offer his greetings to the crown. His arrival was seen by the Protestants as the prelude to the institution of the Tridentine decrees in France.

This complacency was ruptured with the arrival of a second messenger, a certain Titus de Castelnau, brother of the seigneur de Mauvissière. He had been on a reconnaissance mission. This new messenger reported that Condé, Coligny, Andelot, and the seigneur de Mouy were at the head of several thousand men near Montceaux, the nearest of which were already at nearby Lagny, only two leagues away.

The Venetian ambassador was impressed by the covertness of the Protestant action, having been able to assemble so many men without alerting the court. He suggested it spoke to their organisation through the realm.

=== Flight of the court ===
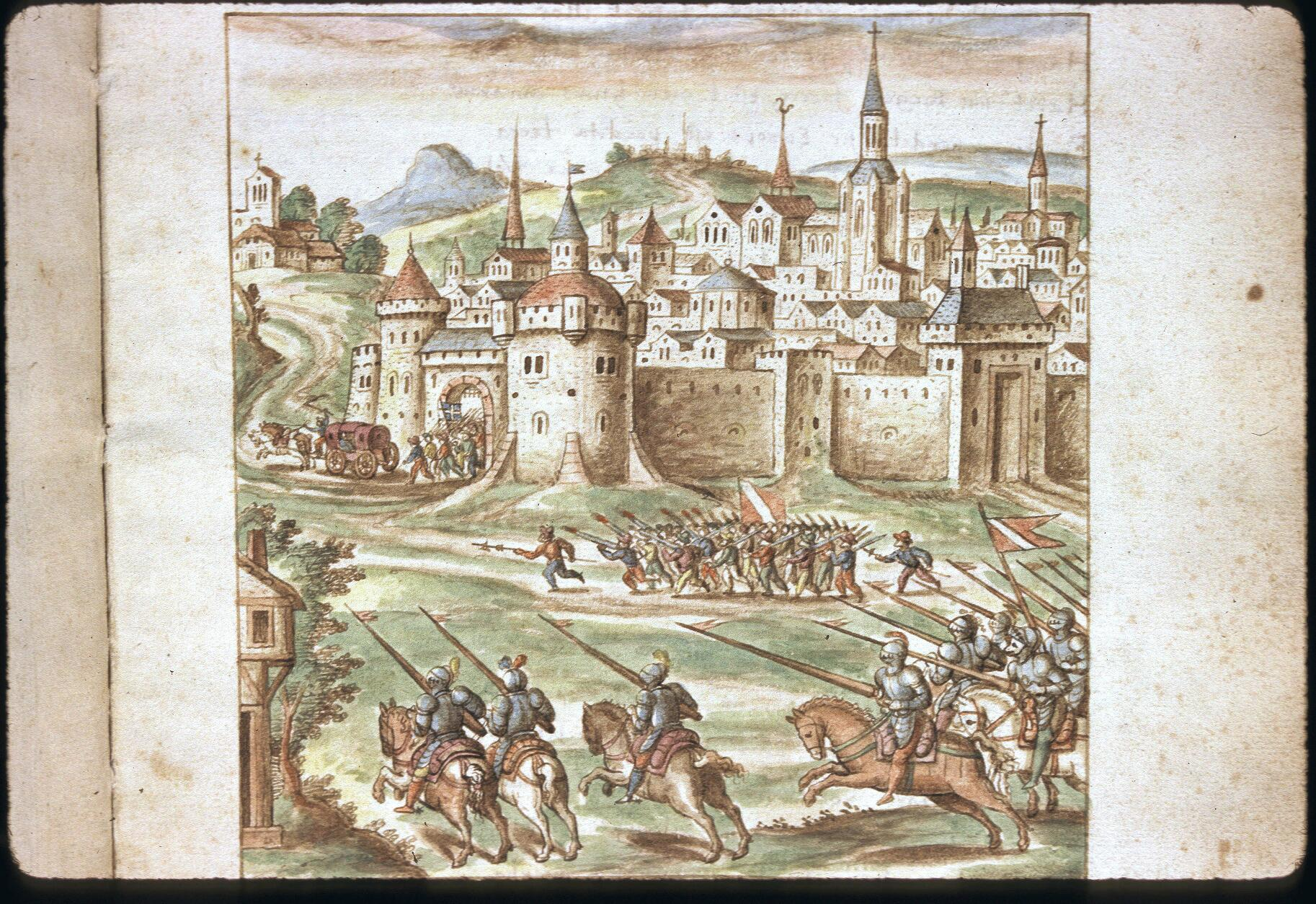
Surprise of Meaux at which the Protestant nobility attempted to kidnap king Charles IX and his mother Catherine de' Medici

The royal family quickly made for the nearby city of Meaux, where they could shelter behind the walls until the arrival of the 6,000 Swiss mercenaries encamped at Château-Thierry. Under their commander Ludwig Pfyffer, the mercenaries made their way from Château-Thierry by forced march, arriving on the evening of 26 September. While in the city, on 27 September, Charles issued a circular explaining the 'scandalous coup' that, if reports were to be believed, threatened not only his life, but that of his mother and brothers. These circular letters were accompanied by a more personal one from Catherine, in which she expressed the bafflement she and Charles felt at the situation, urging the provincial governors to maintain their currently stable situations. Any enterprises tending towards the frustration of this peaceable situation were to be countered by the governors.

While holding council in Meaux, the chancellor de L'Hôpital proposed that they find out the reason that the Protestants had assumed arms. This is to have occasioned an outburst from Catherine who angrily accused L'Hôpital's moderate policy of being the cause. The maréchal de Montmorency, eldest son of the constable de Montmorency was entrusted with going out to negotiate with the Protestant leaders. He met with them at Torcy. Condé assured him that he remained loyal to the crown and that the Protestants had gathered so that they might present a petition to Charles. He reported back to his father that the Protestant nobles were determined. The contemporary historian de Thou characterises his negotiations as a stalling tactic to bridge the time until the Swiss might arrive in Meaux. Getting wind of the approach of the Swiss, the Protestant leadership cut the talks short. Daussy contradicts this, noting that, contrary to the traditional understanding, the Swiss had already arrived in Meaux on 26 September. He cites the Tuscan ambassador and Pfyffer himself to support this conclusion, rather than the understanding of the Protestants, who falsely imagined the king to still be weakly protected.

The French court was of two minds as to how to proceed, to make for Paris or stand their ground. The chancellor L'Hôpital and the constable de Montmorency were little inclined to see the court withdraw to Paris. According to de Thou, Montmorency wished to hold out at Meaux, either fighting there, or avoiding battle entirely. By this means, the court would avoid the appearance of having fled. Through the feelings of vengeance this would inspire in the King, public peace would be compromised. Meaux was fortified, and there were risks of being picked apart in open country. By contrast the Lorraine-Guise at court, and the duc de Nemours counselled a retreat to the capital. Nemours is to have stated that there were many advantages to heading for Paris, and that he would see to the protection of the King on his journey. Catherine was torn on how to proceed. By withdrawing to Paris, the faction of nobles with the court would be elevated into the royal faction. By this means, the kingdom would again be in a civil war. A misunderstanding is then supposed to have followed in a conversation between the captain of the Swiss Pfyffer and Catherine. Pfyffer assured Catherine that the 6,000 Swiss could well protect the court for the retreat back to Paris, misunderstanding her reasoning for being hesitant to follow that course. Catherine in turn interpreted Pfyffer's reassurance as a protection for the court from becoming a pawn of the 'Catholic faction', thereby ensuring she still enjoyed the autonomy necessary to pursue a policy of pacification. Thus, it was resolved on to depart for Paris.

While the king wanted to proffer battle, the constable de Montmorency organised the flight of the court. The contemporary writer Brantôme credits the organisation of the flight to the duc de Nemours, with the King nestled in the middle of the Swiss, and the duc de Nemours at their head. Departing from Meaux at 02:00 on the morning on 28 September, the court began its flight. The spearpoint of the royal flight was taken by the duc de Nemours with the cavalry. The Swiss infantry escorted the court proper first to Lagny and then back to Paris, surrounding the royal party with a wall of pikes as they marched, their number acting as the vanguard and the rearguard as the court made its progress. The Protestant La Noue, who could little disguise how impressed he was by the Swiss, characterised their formation of pikes as being akin to a forest.

The cardinal de Lorraine, for his part, took flight by means of a Turkish horse. In the confusion he had to abandon his plate, and his baggage. One of his servants was killed. For Carroll, there can be little doubt in the fate of the cardinal de Lorraine had he been captured by the Protestants. He dispatched his chaplain to the duke of Alba, the man arriving in the Netherlands on 14 October to request the sending of a trusted man to Lorraine. This man requested Alba come to the aid of the French crown and offered to put places in the kingdom under his control. The duke was at first incredulous, imprisoning the chaplain. Subsequently, Alba dispatched a certain Esteban de Ibarra. He also sent 3,000 horsemen to Seyn and ordered the count of Mansfeld to Luxembourg. Convinced of the veracity of the cardinal de Lorraine's overtures, he expressed openness to the possibility of assuming control of French territory if Charles was overwhelmed by the Protestants, which would be held as collateral for his services.

The royal party was harried by the cavalry of Condé and Coligny who were attempting to seize the king. As the court and soldiers entered the Lagny defile, Condé had approached the Swiss, stating that he desired to speak with the king, but they responded by lowering their pikes. Condé then charged, but penetration into the royal hedgehog of pikes was not possible. The Protestant cavalry, numbering perhaps five or six hundred under Condé and Coligny's command looked to disrupt the royal progress. The fierce resolve of the Swiss kept the Protestant horsemen at bay, and they made little impression against the phalanxes. According to the later writings of the (at that time) twelve-year-old vicomte de Turenne, the king himself took a sword and endeavoured to involve himself in the combat with the Protestants by putting himself at the head of the Swiss. Montmorency had to reprimand the king for risking his life in such a way. Nemours received praise for his role during the royal retreat to the capital. One of his eulogists claims that Charles indicated he owed the preservation of his crown and life firstly to god, and secondly to the duc de Nemours. From Paris, the duc d'Aumale and the maréchal de Vielleville came out with forces of their own to join with the royal party, having been alerted to the situation by the seigneur de Mauvissière. In the latter stages of the flight to the capital, once the threat of the Protestant cavalry had subsided, Charles and Catherine proceeded by carriage. The carriage was surrounded by those gentlemen loyal to the crown. This was not without risk, as had the rebel Protestant's realised the changing travel methods of the royal family, they would have needed only a few hundred horsemen to seize their quicker moving adversary. This did not happen, and therefore, despite these cavalry assaults, the court was able to make it into Paris, arriving in the city by around 04:00 that same morning. The constable de Montmorency stayed back with the body of the Swiss to hold off the Protestants.

As a result of the coup attempt, Catherine's heart hardened against the prince de Condé. She considered him to be a traitor, and became more favourable to war. She also rebuked the chancellor L'Hôpital, ascribing the crown's failed policy to him. The King too was embittered by the experience of the coup and his subsequent flight. He exploded in rage that never again would he be subject to such a cause of panic, and that he would punish those responsible even if he had to seek the perpetrators out in their houses. It would remain in the memory of both figures. Labourdette suggests that, in 1572, it made the King credulous to the idea that there was a new Protestant plot to seize his person, and thus played a role in the Saint Bartholomew's Day Massacre.

The admiral de Coligny, suspected of having led the charges against the court as it conducted its retreat, was replaced as admiral by the firmly Catholic vicomte de Martigues. The comte de Brissac angled to gain from the rebel Andelot the charge of lieutenant-general of the French infantry.

The objective cities of the surprise of Meaux for the Protestant rebels: Troyes, Toulouse and Lyon were not captured. The conspiracy also failed to drive the cardinal de Lorraine from the French court. In the initial wake of their failure, the Protestant army held fort at Claye-Souilly on the road to Paris for five days, while they waited for troops from several provinces (particularly those of Champagne, Burgundy and Picardy) to make their way to join with the main body. It was resolved to send out messengers to the more distant provinces of Guyenne, Languedoc, Dauphiné, Provence, Poitou and Auvergne, requesting the Protestant nobility of these places send all available soldiers to join with the rebel army, which could not face the royal army without them.

Though letters do not survive for most of France, the immediate Protestant mobilisation that followed testifies, in Daussy's view, to their successful transmission.

=== Safe in Paris ===
Having reached the capital, Catherine described the Protestant enterprise, in her correspondence with the baron de Fourquevaux, as an 'infamous enterprise'. In Charles' letter to Fourquevaux of 28 September, the king noted how it could not be said that this conspiracy (which he alleged threatened the lives of the members of the royal family) was a response to religious persecution of Protestantism. Therefore the rebellion could not truly disguise itself under the 'cloak of religion'. Charles ended on an optimistic note, asserting that he did not lack the means to restore them to obedience of him. Charles wrote to the duke of Savoy that it had been necessary for the Swiss to protect him from the Protestant attacks. He noted that the Protestants had seized cities, attempted to seize and kill him, but that God had not allowed this to transpire. These shocking acts were despite the fact that the 'Protestants had not been obstructed in their enjoyment of the pacification edict', therefore the excuse of defence of religion rang hollow to the king. Thus, there was nothing religious about suppressing this rebellion. Similarly in a postscript of a letter of 29 September written to the duke of Savoy, she characterised it as the 'greatest wickedness in the world'. She also vented her frustration at how her hard efforts to pacify the realm were being unravelled. That same day Charles wrote to the duke of Ferrara. He hit on many of the same notes as in his letter to Fourquevaux and Savoy. He noted how a conspiracy had been uncovered that threatened him and his state. The lives of his mother and brothers, as well as his own had been at stake, according to 'many sources'. Similarly, the Protestant pretence to be fighting for religion was shown to be a farce, as they had not been impeded in the exercise of their rights.

Charles appraised the duc de Nevers of the fact that his subjects had risen up against him. The king, conscious of the great damage to royal authority that had been caused by the seizure of cities during the first war of religion urged Nevers to do his utmost to preserve the principal places of his government. Catherine also wrote to the duc de Nevers, calling him 'her cousin'. She described how their lives and state had been put in danger. He was counselled to make his way quickly to unite with the court and bring with him as many men as he could.

With the Spanish, the confessional dimension of the conflict was not played up as might have been imagined, rather the troubles were explained to be a matter of punishing rebels. Gellard sees Tallon's understanding of Philip's objectives as being political rather than religious validated here. Such objectives would have been understood at the French court.

On 8 October, Catherine, through Charles, wrote to the baron de Gordes, lieutenant-general of the province of Dauphiné. She urged him to stop any of those that might be on their way to support the Protestant cause. Where he identified that they were stubborn in their resolve to do so, he was to slaughter them.

Pope Pius V, wrote to the Papal nuncio in France, cardinal della Torre, in October that he should counsel the queen mother that those who had advised her to dismiss the advice of the cardinal de Lorraine had led her poorly.

== War in the provinces ==
At the moment of the surprise of Meaux, it was reported that the Protestants were making attempts on the cities of Montereau, Lagny, Péronne, and Melun. Fighting between Protestants and Catholics took place in Orléans, Soissons, Lyon, Abbeville and Troyes. Orléans, Auxerre, Soissons and Nîmes were seized by the Protestants.

The Protestants enjoyed the most success in their southern strongholds, where the baron d'Acier assumed a position of leadership. In a famous episode, the Protestant seizure of Nîmes was accompanied by a massacre.

In the south-west, the seigneur de Monluc led the royalist counter-offensive. He would conduct an abortive siege of the Protestant held city of La Rochelle.

== Treatises ==
Considering the Protestant discourses concerning the assumption of arms in their sum, Crouzet argues that played on the natural right of the French people to defend themselves against the plans of extermination that had been devised. These plots of extermination did not originate with the King, but a fraction of his subjects. The King himself was not a prisoner, as they had argued him to be in 1562, but rather had been misled. Though he was legally an adult as of the declaration of his majority at Rouen in August 1563, by the standards of customary law he remained a minor and was thus innocent of the crimes others committed in his name.

The most eloquent Protestant pamphlets were compiled together in a collection by a certain printer of Orléans titled Les Requestes, protestations, remonstrances et advertissemens, faits par Monseigneur le Prince de Condé et autres de sa suite, où l'on peut aisément cognoistre les causes et moyens des troubles et guerres présentes. Other pamphlets come down to us individually. Jouanna speculates that, as in 1562, the jurist François Hotman may have played a role in the Protestant discourse.

=== Condé's discourses ===
In the published discourse justifying the steps they'd taken, Condé and his supporters positioned themselves not as representatives of the Protestant faith, but the broader interest of the kingdom. In his protestation, entitled Requeste présentée au Roy, par Monseigneur le Prince de Condé accompagné d'un grand nombre de Seigneurs, gentilshommes et autres qui font profession de la Religion réformée en ce Royaume, Condé stated that his desire was to see the King convoke the Estates, and bring to pass relief for Charles' subjects. They did not seek to impose a Protestant supremacy, indeed, Condé forbade his supporters from molesting others on the grounds of divergent religious beliefs. This represented a published version of the petition presented to Charles by the Protestants on 7 October.

In a follow up document titled Advertissement sur la Protestation de Monseigneur le Prince de Condé that built on Condé's, those who disapproved of the Prince's protestation for not having made any mention of Protestantism were chided. It was Condé's, and indeed the broader nobility's, duty to defend all the King's subjects irrespective of religion. The princes du sang and entire nobility could not revolt in favour of a specific part of the population, but only its whole. The chancellor L'Hôpital, archbishop of Vienne, and Philippe de Commines were quoted from. With the King's advisors resisting the ordinary process by which an Estates General might be called, force was required. It was not the king who was the target of these attacks, but rather the enemies of the monarchy that surrounded him. As champion of the cause of the Estates were a prince du sang (Condé) and all the 'good nobility'. Through this non-confessional argument for rebellion, Condé hoped to rally moderate Catholics behind his opposition to the Lorraine-Guise and Italian advisors of the Crown, as they too had seen their rightful positions usurped.

In a bi-confessional opposition, it was more possible for the place of Condé at its head to be challenged. He thus noted his specific duty in this regard as the premier prince du sang (first prince of the royal blood). He had a responsibility to protect the public good against those who would exploit the King for private ends and thereby cause the crown injury. Condé alone had the duty of protecting the King from his malfeasant advisors. Moving beyond his own person, he argued the nobility at large had the obligation to see to the calling of an Estates.

In the work Discours véritables des propos tenus par Monsieur le prince de Condé, avec les seigneurs députez par le roy: contenant les causes qui ont contraint ledict seigneur prince & autres de sa compagnie à prendre les armes it was argued that those around the King abused his young age to pursue evil policy tending towards the destruction of the Protestants. The King himself would not approve of such actions were he cognisant of them.

=== Upstarts ===
The Protestant nobility saw value in religious toleration. The crown was implored not to sequester the provision of office and award away from Protestant nobles but grant this royal favour without consideration for religion. They protested that as a result of their exclusion from dignities, the dignities were being awarded to unworthy men. In a broader sense they argued Charles was debasing nobility to common status and raising commoners to nobility.

This thread was picked up on in the work Response de Monseigneur le prince de Condé et autres seigneurs de sa compagnie sur certaines propositions à eux faites par Monsieur le Chancelier. Offices and honours were being granted to men of low birth by virtue of their proximity to the King, and if those people happened to be nobles, they were nobles who had not seen military service. Such a state of affairs was insulting to the King's dignity. This represented the published version of the petition Condé had provided for the crown on 3 October.

Still other texts specified the 'unworthy men'. The sons of merchants, parlementaires, and notaries.

The unbearable levels of taxation were deplored, with note given to the extractive Italian salt farm collectors, wine duties and bribes required for justice. This was despite the fact the average yearly taxation during these years, was lower than that at the end of king Henry II's reign.

=== Public weal ===
In the pamphlet Mémoires des occasions de la guerre, appelée Le Bien Public, rapportés à l'état de la guerre présente the current conflict was analogised with that of the War of the Public Weal in 1465. The author set out the situation in 1465, a kingdom in which justice was poorly administered, novel taxes were improperly levied, and the state was in disorder. The author noted that Louis XI was raising those of low birth, and demeaning those of great birth, in such a way that was difficult to bear. Boltanski argues that this attack could be seen as an attack against the duc de Nevers, whose position in the French nobility owed so much to royal favour. These societal ills mandated the calling of an Estates to resolve. The prince de Condé and those with him were thus justified in taking up arms, as those who had opposed Louis XI's government had been, to see the bringing about of an Estates General, and the lowering of the taille, as no other recourse had been left open to him. There was no need to wait for the convention of the Estates though to rid the king of his Italian advisers. Here the example of king Philip IV was employed. This king had expelled the Italian usurers in 1347. Unlike the cabal of advisers that surrounded the king, an Estates would offer a far more representative cross-section of the kingdom, and would be much better suited to propose solutions to France's judicial, religious and economic troubles. The persecution of Protestantism was simply one tendril of a general royal tyranny.

This was the first time in a century that the ambition to curtail the monarch's power through an intermediary body like the Estates had been forwarded. Indeed, Chevallier finds parallels with the League of the Public Weal, as had the contemporary pamphleteer.

=== Religion ===
Pernot argues that the rebel Protestant attempts to ensconce themselves in a broader political program had the effect of further disgusting Charles IX, who believed in a more absolute monarchy. The rank and file Protestants were also dismayed that a right to freedom for worship for all was not a feature of their leader's rhetorical battle with the crown. The relative paucity of focus on religious matters, was useful fuels for the opponents of the rebels. They were able to argue that it demonstrated that religion was just a 'pretext' for their rebellion, which had the true goal of defying and denigrating the dignity of the crown.

This is not to say all Protestant pamphlets downplayed the religious element of the war. In the work titled Le chrestien postulat de monseigneur le prince de Condé, the demand for total freedom of religion was front and centre. Charles was implored to permit Protestant worship irrespective of station and place, and publicly. Jouanna sees the influence of the admiral de Coligny in this work but argues that it is fundamentally the exception in the 'war of words' of pamphlets of the war.

=== Foreigners ===
In the pamphlet titled Requeste et remonstrance du peuple adressante au Roy, the problem of the repression of Protestantism and the 'usurpation of the state' were argued to derive from a singular cause. The continual modification, and revocation of royal edicts made the French crown appear fickle and indecisive in foreign eyes. The reason for the instability of policy was to be found in the 'foreign advisers' of the king: those of Lorraine (the Guise), and those of Italy (like Birague). By the usurpation of the royal council by such unworthy figures, French princes and great seigneurs who should be present to advise the king were frozen out. Their names blackened, they could no longer access the king for fear of their own safety. These Italians extracted money from the poor, which instead of being put towards the debts of the kingdom was instead taken by the foreigners and tax farmers, as well as those who permitted their regime of extraction. Charles was exhorted to follow the example of king Louis XII by surrounding himself with good and loyal advisors. The proposal first put forward by the conspirators of Amboise was picked up in Requeste et remonstrance, that rather than cloistering himself with a handful of councillors, the king surround himself with men selected by the Estates General. Irrespective of his age, the king must always be advised well. Other pamphlets also championed a similar theme.

The secretary of state L'Aubespine came in for particular attack as the stand-in for the recent birth of the ministerial system in France.

The usage of lettres de cachet, which were private, rather than lettres patent which were public, also came in for critique. Through these means, it was argued, the crown sought to disguise their ill intentions.

== Negotiations ==
Though she had distanced herself from the policy of the chancellor L'Hôpital, he was nevertheless one of the men tasked (alongside Morvillier, the bishop of Orléans and the maréchal de Vielleville) with heading to the Protestant camp, then at Claye-Souilly, around the start of October, to find out the reason they had assumed arms. Meeting with Condé, Coligny and others, they were provided with a petition that Condé had intended to present to the King had the surprise of Meaux provided to be a success. This petition made the argument that Charles' opinion of the Protestants had been poisoned by the Lorraine-Guise family, notably the cardinal de Lorraine in particular. Thus, the King had been driven to consider the arrest, if not execution of the Protestant leaders. In such circumstances, it was necessary for the Protestants to approach the King armed, so that they might remove these malfeasant advisors from around him that clouded his judgement.

While awaiting a royal response to this petition, the Protestant army left Claye-Souilly to establish a new base at Saint-Denis, where they arrived on 3 October. It was thus to Saint-Denis that L'Hôpital and the bishop of Orléans returned with the purpose of getting Condé and the rebel Protestants to lay down their arms in return for amnesty by Catherine that day. They expressed surprise that Condé would take such a step as a coup without even declaring war, something that foreigners would do. Condé retorted that he had not assumed arms against the king, but rather his compatriots had been forced to arms to protect their party. As concerned the mission to get the Protestants to lay down their arms, this was refused by the Protestant leadership, with Condé responding in the form of a second petition to the crown, much more expansive than that of 2 October. This petition demanded universal freedom of worship throughout France regardless of station or location. He demanded the convening of an Estates General, the lowering of taxes and the purging of the kingdoms Italian advisors and other foreigners (including those of Lorraine-Guise and Savoie-Nemours), who burdened the people with unjust taxes. The Italians were 'even guilty of imposing fiscal burdens on the nobles, who were unaccustomed to such things.’ This last point was a direct attack against Catherine and her Italian advisors. According to the historian Sutherland, this attack was aimed squarely at the duc de Nevers, the comte de Retz, and the duc de Nemours. This was an expansion of prior Protestant rhetorical attacks, which had focused themselves on the Lorraine-Guise family as far as attacks on foreigners were concerned. The historian Cloulas grants that it was true that Catherine utilised Italian financiers to support the lavish court in return for allowing them to reimburse themselves from tax revenues. As part of this anti-foreigner plan, Catherine herself would be among those forced to retire from the government. Condé also sought to see the maréchal de Montmorency established as Grand Maître (Grand Master - the office responsible for the King's household, the charge held by the duc de Guise). With the 'leech like' foreigners removed, offices could be granted to the French nobility on the basis of merit and virtue irrespective of confessional affiliation. The Protestants would receive Metz, Le Havre and Calais as surety towns. The contents of the second Protestant petition were delivered to Charles by the seigneur de Lignerolles. The historian Cloulas characterises Condé's demands as "arrogant". These demands were unacceptable to Charles, but he sent the seigneur de Saint-Sulpice to the rebels to gain further insight. Saint-Sulpice yielded similarly low results. Then, L'Hôpital again went to meet with the rebels. They proposed that he serve as the judge in their cases and further demanded a trial of the Lorraine-Guise for slandering them.

L'Hôpital wished to continue negotiations, but this earned him a rebuke from Catherine, who now placed responsibility for the religious policy of the last years, and thus the present situation, in his hands.

On 7 October, in a revival of an ancient ceremony, several ornately dressed heralds appeared in the Protestant camp. They twice summoned the prince de Condé, admiral de Coligny, the seigneur d'Andelot and the other Protestant leaders to surrender themselves with three days and come to court, or be declared guilty of rebellion. The other nobles summoned to come to court were the comte de La Rochefoucauld, the comte de Montgommery, the comte de Sault, the seigneur de Genlis, the seigneur de Bouchavannes, the seigneur de Mouy, the seigneur de Lizy, François de Boucard, Raguier d'Esternay, the baron de Bussy, the vidame d'Amiens, and the vidame de Chartres. The herald had instructions to express to the cardinal de Châtillon his uncle's (the constable de Montmorency) regret that he had secured advancement for his nephew. Though caught off guard by this unusual ceremony, the Protestant leaders remained committed to their course. Though certain moderations were inspired by this display, the leadership believing they might have overstepped the mark in their involvement in matters of taxation and government, they nevertheless made a third appeal to the crown in which they demanded the surrender of Calais, Le Havre and Metz as surety, the disarming of the crown, and dismissal of foreign troops in the royal service (i.e. the Swiss). One church in every town was sought for the Protestants as a religious settlement alongside complete religious freedom in the kingdom. The convention of an Estates General was again called for in this work (the only political element of this third petition according to Daussy), by contrast the attacks on the 'foreigners' were absent.

Despite the protestations of loyalty and submission in these petitions, their contents remained audaciously provocative and annoyed the King. In the wake of the third, the constable de Montmorency was sent out to the Protestant camp. He would conduct talks across 9 and 10 October, accompanied for his part by the baron de Châteauneuf, the maréchal de Montmorency, and the seigneur de Gonnor. He progressed at the head of a force of soldiers, numbering some 2,000 cavalry and 1,000 arquebusiers, before moving out ahead of them to meet with the rebel Protestant leaders. Seeing his nephews in the Protestant camp, the constable de Montmorency would refuse to dismount his horse. The Protestant leaders likewise preceded their army. For the Protestants, the admiral de Coligny, the cardinal de Châtillon, the seigneur d'Andelot, and comte de La Rochefoucauld. The discussions of the first day were abortive due to the foul weather. Decrue reports that the Constable quarrelled with his nephew the cardinal de Châtillon during the talks. The discussions initially concerned themselves with banalities. Moving to serious matters, the constable refused to engage with the Protestant demands, the King's edicts were his business, not that of his subjects. The Constable upbraided Condé, noting that Charles would be betraying Christianity to establish two religions in his kingdom. Montmorency quarrelled with his nephew the cardinal de Châtillon who accused his uncle of having advised Charles to prorogue the edict of Amboise, something that Montmorency denied. He argued that if the king restored the edict of Amboise it would be at his discretion to modify and revoke it as he pleased. On 10 October, he noted that it had always been the plan that the toleration of Protestantism alongside Catholicism would be temporary, and the edict of Amboise which had brought the first war of religion to a close was a provisional one. The short-term royal objective had always been to see the restoration of Catholic unity in the kingdom. With both sides intransigent, the possibility of reaching an agreement appeared beyond reach, and the two sides left one another in a foul mood. Wanegffelen argues that while this is often blamed on the constable de Montmorency's character, he was likely operating on instruction from Catherine. He remained open to future negotiations however, Wanegffelen suspects this was a product of him acting on the orders of Catherine. Military confrontation became inevitable. This diplomatic effort was reported by the Venetian ambassador in his despatch of 15 October.

A new round of negotiations was undertaken on 26 October by the bishop of Orléans, the baron de Châteauneuf, and the maréchal de Montmorency. They met with the Protestants at Saint-Denis. The contents of these negotiations are unknown, but they were unsuccessful, and contemporaries linked their failure with the baron de Châteauneuf's subsequent illness and death. Álava found his position at the French court much improved by the crisis of the war. Where a few months ago he had been advised to steer clear of dictating policy to the French crown, his opinion was now sought after, as when a negotiation proposal from Condé was delivered towards the end of October Catherine sought the opinion of Álava on the matter. The ambassador thought entertaining such notions of peace was an odious path forward, noting that he had already informed Philip II of the crown's resolve to fight.

== Military finance ==
=== Protestant finance ===
Throughout the war, fiscal necessity would be a pressing concern for the rebel Protestant army. They would employ four different types of revenue towards the payment of their soldiery.

Firstly, the confiscation of the wealth of the Catholic church. This represented a far smaller share of Protestant revenues than it had during the first war of religion. This was focused on towns that had not been subject to the rebel's iconoclastic fury in the last conflict. Condé did not issue specific instructions on the conduct of this process, as he had during the prior war, which Daussy finds indicative of its secondary nature. The confiscation of royal, ecclesiastical and municipal revenues would remain a prime source of revenues for the Protestants. An increasingly common revenue stream was ransom, both of persons and cities. Those places captured without a fight could be forced to pay money to avoid a sack. Overall, the most central method of financing for the Protestants remained the forced loan imposed on the Catholic residents of the towns under their control, and if need was severe, also on the Protestant residents.

100,000 livres was raised through forced loans on the Protestant held towns.

=== Royalist finance ===
In relation to the crown's debts to the grand parti of Lyon (a banking syndicate that had initially leant to the French crown during the reign of Henri II), payments were suspended on the outbreak of the civil war. This created problems, as Swiss financiers had bought their way into the Lyonnais syndicate, and blocked the hiring of mercenaries until they had received acknowledgement for their portion of the debt.

États survive which outline the expense of the royal army in the field during December 1567 and January 1568. In the first month, the costs of the army totalled 981,792 livres (of which 337,396 was for the gendarmerie, and 142,265 for foreign infantry). This was around triple the regular military peacetime budget. Come January, the addition of German cavalry (who required 314,000 livres), and foreign light cavalry (which cost 32,500 livres) brought the expenses of the crown up to 1,328,292. The magnitude of this expense made it difficult to keep an army in the field for a long time. These états do not include the royal garrisons left in Picardy, French Piedmont, Metz and Lyon, or the infantry and light cavalry operating outside of the northeast of the kingdom. Wood argues that in a conservative estimate that would have been another 100,000 livres a month. Further, there were regular expenses like the royal guard, fortifications, the artillery budget and so on which presented a monthly cost of around 92,000 livres. Thus, the annual spending at this level of mobilisation was around 18,000,000 livres, a greater total than the entirety of royal revenue, over half of which was typically devoted to non-military expenses.

For the royalists, a need to finance their mercenaries in November and December would necessitate the cancellation of the suppression of the offices outlined in the Grand Ordinance of Moulins as being terminated on the death of their current holder. A new edict of January 1568 allowed for minor officials to pay a third of the value of their office in return for the right to have their chosen heir succeed them. This was a more favourable arrangement than that afforded more senior officers, permitting transference even if the father died within forty days of the establishment of the transfer, a widow was also able to nominate a candidate if the office holder's death was sudden and they had been unable to make arrangements.

By February 1568, the crown was staring down the barrel of bankruptcy. These financial considerations dictated military policy and induced a peace settlement the following month.

== Siege of Paris ==
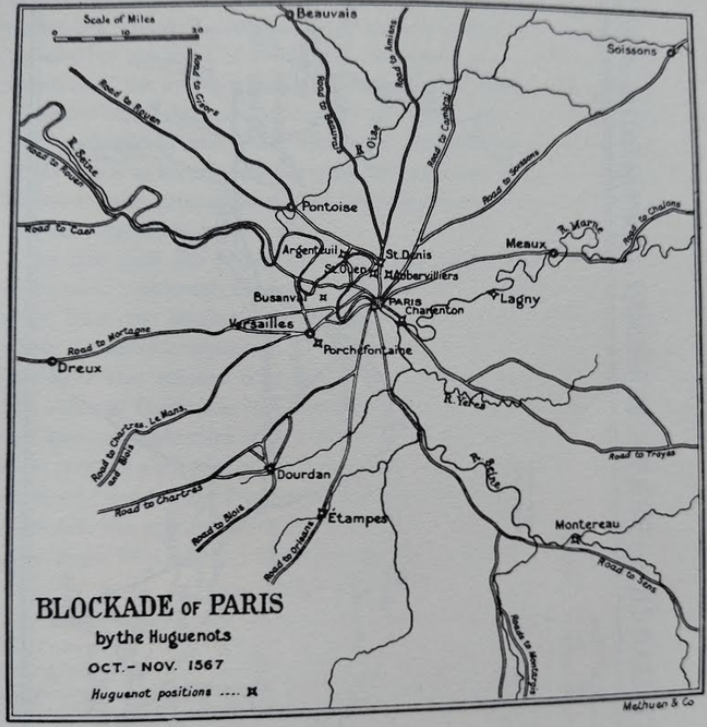
The Protestant siege of Paris, with the places occupied by the rebels marked

=== Protestant Reinforcements ===
The Protestant army received several influxes of reinforcements while encamped at Claye-Souilly. This included the regiment of the baron de Bourry; that of the seigneur de Clervant who had made his way from the border city of Metz; and finally a detachment under the command of the comte de Montgommery, comte de La Suze and the seigneur de Lavardin. From here they put the capital to siege, hoping to starve the place out, as they could no longer count on capturing the King in open country. Beyond a desire to force concessions from the crown, this was also an opportunity to punish the militantly Catholic capital. Even with recently arrived reinforcements, their numbers were not sufficient for such an approach, given the capital's population was somewhere between 300,000 and 400,000.

From more distant areas, the seigneur de La Rochefoucauld made his way up to Paris from Poitou and the comte de Gramont brought forth Gascon soldiers to serve as reinforcements.

=== Securing the peripheries ===
A large number of places around Paris fell to the Protestants over the coming days: Saint-Denis, Lagny, Charenton, Porche, Fontaine, Buzenval, Argenteuil, Saint-Ouen, Aubervilliers, and further out Dreux (on the road to Normandy), Montereau (on the road to Sens), Étampes (on the road to Orléans) and Dourdan (at the junction of the Blois-Chartres road). By their control of Montereau, where a large garrison was installed, the Seine was impeded, and by that of Charenton the Marne blocked, thereby cutting off supplies to the capital. The winning of Étampes, an undertaking led by the admiral de Coligny who took the place by surprise cost the capital its granary. He was joined in Étampes by the comte de Montgommery with four-hundred cavalry. Lagny meanwhile commanded an important bridge upon the road to the capital.

The Protestant soldiers fanned out into the countryside, torching the eight mills of the capital, including those between the Porte du Temple and the Porte Saint-Honoré, stripping churches of their wealth, and impeding the passage of food convoys into the capital. Valuable items from the churches were to be devoted to the cause, forced loans were imposed on the small merchants, and the peasantry inducted into forced labour causing many to flee for Paris. The peasants drove their cattle and grain into the capital as they fled, providing much needed victuals for the besieged capital. The clergy's lace and linen were repurposed as shirts and handkerchiefs among the Protestant nobility. The surrender of Charenton's garrison was pinned by the Parisian populace on the 'treason' of their governor, the maréchal de Montmorency.

In retaliation for the seizures of various towns, the Protestant temple in Meaux was burned down.

=== Inside Paris ===
Though safe from the Protestants in the fervently Catholic Paris, the king was now encircled in his capital by the Protestants. Of the fourteen gates of the capital, four were left open, and the rest shuttered. On 29 September, Charles reestablished the Paris militia, on the lines it had existed in during the first civil war. Unlike the force he had authorised for the city in August, those who had served as captains during the previous civil war would be permitted to do so again in this new organisation. At some point before the end of September, Charles issued an appeal to the Catholic clergy that wished to assume arms, to engage in the defence of the Catholic religion.

The Protestants hoped that faced with starvation, the royalists inside Paris would be forced to come out and offer battle, which, having been won by the Protestants, would provide victory to their cause. Inside Paris, supplies of the famous Gonesse white bread ceased to arrive in the capital. On the night of 1-2 October, the Protestants torched a dozen or so windmills before the porte Saint-Denis. The flames were visible throughout Paris, and convinced they were under attack, the Parisians ran to arms. Chains were thrown across the streets, and firearms acquired. These would ultimately prove unnecessary as the Protestant rebels would not assault Paris. On 2 October, the Protestant army relocated from Claye-Souilly to Saint-Denis, feeling it a better place to await the response to their petition to the crown. Condé split his forces between Saint-Denis and Le Bourget. The Prince and the admiral de Coligny directed their wives to make for Orléans, which the Protestants had captured, so that they might be assured of their safety.

Inside the capital, Charles permitted the people to arm, and they descended upon the Protestants in their midst, killing them. On 2 October, Charles gave order that those Protestants who had not fled were to leave the capital. One anonymous observer noted that saying a word in favour of the rebellious Protestants made murder permissible, and that this was a fate suffered by many. Rumour spread that Protestants intended to torch their own houses in the hopes of seeing the city burn, Catholics responded by breaking into Protestant homes, to search for the presumably guilty parties suspected of stocking up on powder. This observer also stated that a royal edict required all Catholics to visually identify themselves with a stitched white cross on their person on pain of death for non-compliance. There is no evidence of such an edict, but another observer, Pasquier, reported that it was felt to be prudent to make a visible show of one's Catholicity. The same observer who noted the usage of the stitched crosses remarked that it was felt permissible in the climate to sell ones tunic to buy a sword. Alongside murder, Protestants were imprisoned on charge of heresy, both in the hopes of impeding Condé's ability to recruit, and to interfere with the financial support the Protestants enjoyed through the international connections of their merchants. Simon Vigor, the radical preacher, remarked that the Protestant faith had been established by the sword, and it would be destroyed by it. Money was sought from the clergy of the capital. They protested of the sums they had forwarded to the crown over years previous, eventually agreeing to a small sum. The city of Paris offered to raise an army on its own expense for four months, provided the Protestant rebels be crushed rather than negotiated with.

Writing to the governors of the kingdom on 5 October, Charles reinforced the earlier royal directives issued at the end of September. They were to maintain their provinces in passive obedience to the crown, with his subjects demonstrating their loyalty and affection to him. Where they identified those inclined to support the Protestant rebellion they were to, if necessary, slaughter them to a man. This brutal repression was aimed at those Protestants who used religion as a 'pretext' for rebellion, rather than the religion at large.

=== Royal outreach ===
Charles ordered the mobilisation of the old bands (fr:Vieux corps), under Filippo di Piero Strozzi, in addition to all other available men of war. Strozzi, commander of the royal guard, was substituted for the seigneur d'Andelot into the office of colonel-general of the French infantry. Strozzi's band came forth from Picardy. The admiral de Coligny and seigneur de Mouy attempted to prevent his juncture with the royalists in Paris without success. The number of French infantry regiments ballooned from just one, to eleven, with the companies increasing from eleven to one hundred and eighteen.

On the 28th of September, Charles wrote to the governor of Péronne, d'Humières to inform him that the seigneur de Strozzi would be bringing the gendarme companies under d'Humières authority out of Picardy to provide support to the king in Paris. With four gendarme companies having been summoned to the capital from Picardy, Charles was concerned for the defence of this sensitive border province that stood next to the source of the rebels potential for greatest aid, the Dutch Geuzen (Protestant nobles opposed to Philip II's government of the Netherlands). As such, Charles wrote to d'Humières on 5 October to advise him to raise four companies of the Picard legion, which would be stationed in Péronne. With Spanish help having been called for by the French crown, d'Humières was instructed to receive the forces of the duke of Alba on 11 October.

A week later, on 18 October, d'Humières was advised that Condé was attempting to draw some artillery companies from the province, over which he was the governor. D'Humières was to intercept the artillery and prevent its transport to the Île de France. In a letter of 24 October, the governor of Péronne was congratulated for his efforts to preserve order in the areas under his authority, through the disarmament of suspected individuals.

Montmorency ordered the seigneur de Brissac to bring reinforcements from Lyon. Having arrived in the capital, during October Brissac would muster twenty companies of infantry in Paris, totalling around 2,500 men. These men were almost equally balanced between pike and shot in their weapons.

The seigneur de Monluc was able to mobilise twenty-five companies of infantry, nine companies of men-at-arms, six-hundred light cavalry and four-hundred volunteers who went north with Monluc at their head to support Charles in November.

As Burgundy, Champagne, and Anjou were largely free of disturbances, these places could have their soldiery summoned to the capital with relatively little risk.

The French ambassador in Spain, Fourquevaux pled his uselessness as an ambassador in comparison with the military service he could provide for the crown in France in a despatch of 17 October 1567. In Languedoc, he said, he could aid the preservation of obedience to the crown and raise 10,000 soldiers to fight in other parts of the kingdom as required.

Catherine wrote optimistically to the duc de Nevers on the royalist position in the capital. She argued that their position was a strong one, with many good people coming to reinforce their position. She urgently summoned the seigneur de Tavannes to make for the capital immediately with all the forces at his disposal, so that he might serve the crown. In addition to his own compagnie he was to bring with him that of the duc d'Aumale, the comte de Charny, the comte de Vaudémont, the comte de Roussillon, the count of Bene and the duke of Savoy. She assured Tavannes his passage to Paris would be trivial, as all the rebel Protestants were concentrated in the confines around the city. In his absence from Burgundy, the seigneur de Vennoux would hold the fort in the province as lieutenant-general. Tavannes received two communications from the capital around this time, one on 28 September, the next following the day after, both advising him to make haste to the capital. Tavannes was also to bring up to Paris a new levy of 4,000 Swiss that the French crown had undertaken.

The constable de Montmorency received the reinforcements from the provinces as they came in. In addition to this, Parisian soldiers were raised. He soon enjoyed an army of around 15,000 to 16,000 infantry and 4,000 cavalry, with further volunteers. Even in times of crisis such as this, the crown refused to pull out its concentration of infantry from the key border citadels such as Metz and Calais. The Parisian volunteers were given the insignia of a white cross. Aid could be anticipated to arrive from the duke of Alba also sometime soon. Cloulas puts the royal cavalry at 8,000.

=== Royalist offensive ===
Montmorency, and his father the constable de Montmorency, would be the target of much of the Parisian anger as hunger bit more fiercely through October. The contemporary historian de Thou opined that were it not for the presence of Charles in the capital, there would have been a rebellion. Montmorency was criticised for allowing his significantly numerically inferior besiegers to have the capital in their vice. He struck out on 4 November, capturing Argenteuil. This was followed the day after with the occupation of La Chapelle. The more active martial posture of the constable de Montmorency did not stifle the criticisms made against he and his son.

Montmorency's more aggressive posture was followed by further royalist success. On 6 November, the commander Strozzi destroyed a pontoon bridge the Protestants had built upstream on the Seine to block the river. The following day, the duc de Nemours seized Buzenval back from the Protestants. Despite the increasing assertiveness of the royalists, on 8 November, Condé resolved to send away the seigneur d'Andelot to capture Poissy, and the comte de Montgommery to take Pontoise. The comte de La Rochefoucauld was also dispatched, in sum leaving the main Protestant army with less than half of its cavalry. Knecht sees this as a reflection of Condé's overconfidence concerning Montmorency's conservativeness of command. His army was left deficient in numbers. Worse, news of La Rochefoucauld and Andelot's departure reached the royalists in Paris. The constable de Montmorency was appraised of this, and on 9 November departed from the capital to give battle. The Constable had been dogged by rumours that he was refusing to give battle due to the fact his nephews were among the besieging army. That same day, Condé was forced to abandon Charenton, destroying its bridge and torching the place on his departure.

The same day that the royalists destroyed the pontoon bridge the Protestants had constructed on the Seine, the baron de Fourquevaux, French ambassador to Spain, enjoyed an audience with king Philip. He provided the official notice that civil war had resumed in France. Philip made it clear to Fourquevaux that he expected the rebellion to be crushed in return for his support. Fourquevaux reported back to Charles on 13 November that Philip was of the opinion he could not enjoy peace in the Low Countries, if the French Protestants continued to enjoy such power, as they would surely keep in touch with one another. He had to respond to this eventuality by sending large garrisons to the Spanish Netherlands. Fourquevaux also cautioned Catherine against pursuing battle unless the advantage for the royalists was overwhelming. With battle came risk. This was an opinion Catherine shared, she subscribing to a neoplatonic worldview.

== Saint-Denis ==
=== State of the armies ===
Around the year 1566, the royal army could boast for its cavalry a roster of 3,160 lances. A lance was a unit of 5 to 7 men both on horseback and foot that each man-at-arms or homme d'armes (i.e. the fully armoured soldier) possessed. It contained a mixture of cavalry and infantry, with the horseback archers being more lightly armoured than the men-at-arms. Thus, 3,160 lances worked out at 7,900 gendarmes (the chiefly noble heavy cavalry which had constituted the core of the royal army for the last century). Recruitment problems were created by the religious schism, with some of the gendarmerie favouring Protestantism. Therefore the crown looked to transform archers that formed part of the lance, into men-at-arms. While letters of commission referred to companies as being 50 or 100 lances, in practice the actual strength of companies was typically 30 or 60 lances. Despite this theoretical size then, at the battle of Saint-Denis, only 3,000 cavalry would be brought to bear by the crown. The crown had dramatically expanded the gendarmerie after the outbreak of civil war, the number of companies peaking during the war at one hundred and ninety-three from its pre-war total of eighty-nine.

With the Protestant line weak (numbering around 1,200 to 1,500 cavalry and a similar number of arquebusiers according to Crété), the constable de Montmorency effected a sortie through the porte Saint-Denis with his cavalry and artillery, the aged Constable watching as the soldiers passed through before dawn.

The French artillery enjoyed a long pedigree, descending from the force that Charles VIII had brought to bear in Italy in 1493 with such a decisive effect. Even longer term than this, the French crown had pioneered the mobile artillery train in the dying days of the Hundred Years War. The Protestants were aware of this, with La Noue bemoaning it as a critical weakness of the Protestant army. The leadership thus debated how to proceed. Some counselled abandoning Aubervilliers and Saint-Ouen and retreating to Saint-Denis where they could reunite with the seigneur d'Andelot. Coligny favoured harassing the enemy without offering battle. The prince de Condé favoured battle. The only compromise Coligny was able to achieve was to delay the giving of battle to the afternoon so that, if necessary, the army might withdraw under cover of darkness.

Both Charles IX and his brother, the duc d'Anjou had been desirous to join the royal army, so that they might fight the besiegers. Catherine and her advisors succeeded in recalling them back to the Louvre. She was uninterested in offering the possibility to the Protestants of achieving what they had failed to accomplish at Meaux unnecessarily (i.e. the capture of the King). Anjou and Charles would watch the battle from one of the Louvre towers instead. A meeting between Álava and the French royal family (including Catherine, Charles, the duc d'Anjou and the duc d'Alençon) transpired at the court on the day of the battle. Catherine was in a state of great apprehension concerning the confrontation. This confused Álava who noted that only two days previous, Catherine had been filled with confidence as to the destruction of the rebellion. He further noted that they had only resolved to give battle because the Protestants had insisted upon it. Recalibrating to the mood of the room, he noted that were it still possible, he would pray Charles call back the army from the confrontation. Seeing Álava's anxiety, Catherine reassured him, that battle had been resolved upon after word had come of the Protestants sending away much of their forces, and with this information in hand Álava approved of the matter. In his letter to Philip II, he explained to his sovereign that the French had kept him in the dark for some time. Charles then inquired of Álava as to word of the duke of Alba's reinforcements, and with the Ambassador protesting that he had none, he was advised to urge Alba to hurry so that the Protestant German reinforcements might be intercepted. Álava was taken up a tower of the Louvre to see the march of the army into the field. The Ottoman extraordinary ambassador Haci Murad, who happened to be in the capital around this time, was invited by some Parisian gentlemen to watch the coming battle at Montmartre.

=== Disposition on the field ===
Mariéjol puts the royal army at around 18,000 infantry and 3,000 gendarmes, while the Protestants had between 1,000 and 1,200 arquebusiers, and 1,400 to 1,500 cavalry armed not with lances but poles to which iron tips had been attached. Le Roux puts the Protestant numbers a little higher, at 3,500 infantry and 1,500 cavalry. It had not proved possible for them to call back the comte de Montgommery or seigneur d'Andelot's forces. The constable de Montmorency's army contained the 6,000 Swiss under the command of Pfyffer (who were overwhelmingly pike soldiers), 10,000 French infantry under the command of Strozzi and the seigneur de Brissac, the cream of the French gendarmerie and good artillery. It was based out of a place called La Villette. Decrue rates the skill of Strozzi, Pfyffer and Brissac highly. Among those who got their first taste of battle at Saint-Denis was the royal bastard Henri, the chevalier d'Angoulême, then only sixteen-years-old.

The Protestant force had divided their cavalry into three corps, the right under the command of Coligny at Saint-Ouen, the left under the seigneur de Genlis at Aubervilliers and the centre under Condé's command. Coligny's flanks were watched over by the arquebusiers who were on foot. The Protestants had no cannons or pikemen. Montmorency enjoyed a 6:1 advantage in numbers and deployed on both sides of the causeway that led from Paris to Saint-Denis.

On the Constable's left, facing Saint-Ouen, was the cavalry of the duc de Nemours, the seigneur de Thoré and the duc de Longueville, as well as a legion of the Parisian volunteers. Montmorency himself was in the royal centre with the gendarmerie and the Swiss. To his right the royal artillery, and then the royal right under the maréchal de Cossé. Cossé had the cavalry companies of the duc d'Aumale and seigneur de Damville, the infantry of Strozzi and Brissac.

The plan of the Constable was to seize the two anchor points of the Protestant army simultaneously (Saint-Ouen and Aubervilliers), before advancing on Saint-Denis itself.

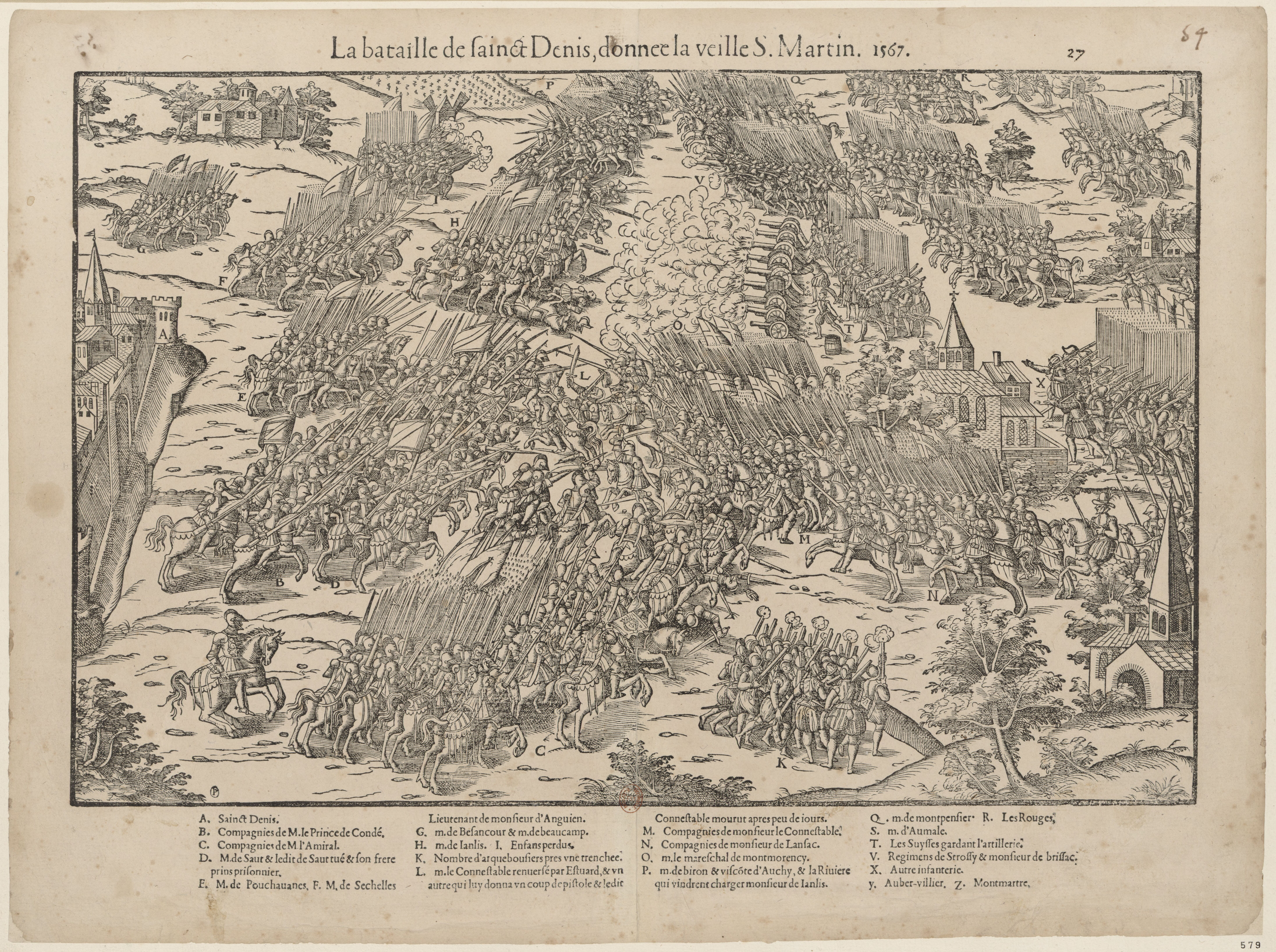
Battle of Saint-Denis between the royalists and the Protestant rebels

Battle was joined between the royalists and Protestants at 15:00 on 10 November. Montmorency hoped to separate the Protestants from Saint-Denis and looked to attack the Protestant left. He was hasty, and even before observing the effect of his artillery barrage, or waiting for his infantry to deploy, he ordered Aumale and Damville's cavalry forward against the seigneur de Genlis' corps, without support from Cossé's infantry. This attack failed. The seigneur de Biron and maréchal de Cossé were ordered to charge with their cavalry, but their advance was broken by a ditch filled with Protestant arquebusiers.

Despite being outnumbered, the Protestants likewise attacked. Coligny's cavalry crashed through the light cavalry opposite them and penetrated into the Parisian bourgeois volunteers who began to retreat towards Montmartre. Montpensier meanwhile held strong on the royalist right. As the Parisians withdrew in disarray they caused confusion among the Swiss. Condé's gendarmes drove into those of the constable de Montmorency. In the ferocity of the attack, the constable was unhorsed and isolated from his men and was approached by a certain Robert Stuart. By this time, Montmorency was already wounded to a great degree, having received four sword blows and a strike on the head from a mace. His jaw had been broken by a sword blow. Stuart called on Montmorency to surrender to him, to which Montmorency rejoindered by striking Stuart in the face with the hilt of his sword, knocking out three teeth. Concurrent to this defiant act, Montmorency was shot in the kidney with a pistol and fell to the ground, the bullet lodging itself by his spine. Champion records an exchange that is to have taken place between Stuart and Montmorency, Montmorency protesting to Stuart 'Don't you recognise me>? with Stuart replying that it was because he recognised Montmorency that he would shoot him. The constable was rescued from the field by his sons Thoré and Damville. His eldest son, the maréchal de Montmorency restored control over the royal army. He pursued the admiral de Coligny while his younger brother Damville chased Condé's squadron. During the chaos, Condé's horse was shot out from under him. Taking advantage of the rainy conditions to enjoy a withdrawal without pursuit, the Protestants fell back to Saint-Denis under the cover of darkness. Le Roux describes the Protestant retreat from the battle as 'catastrophic'.

=== Result ===
In total, around a thousand were killed at the battle of Saint-Denis. Of these, a majority were Protestants. The duc d'Aumale toured the field the day after the battle, to gauge the number and quality (i.e. rank) of the dead.

Victory went to the royalists, primarily by virtue of remaining in control of the battlefield. Writing on 26 November to the lieutenant-general of Poitou, the comte du Lude, Charles spoke of the victory God had given him over the Protestant rebels. Only the falling of night had spared them from complete destruction in his estimation. King Charles delivered word of the royal victory to the Spanish ambassador Álava, who offered his congratulations. Álava then went to visit the bedside of the dying constable de Montmorency. Montmorency's bedside was surrounded by his wife and sons, though he was unable to recognise them. The Spanish king prepared a letter for his wife, Élisabeth, to send in the wake of the battle. This letter urged Charles and Catherine forward, to continue to punish the heretical rebels. In his own letter to Fourquevaux of 14 November, Charles spoke a similar tune to the Spanish court. He spoke of an exemplary punishment that might be remembered through history. In her own letter of the same day to Philip, Catherine opined that the victory was not just one for France, but all of Christendom. In her letter to Fourquevaux, she struck an optimistic note, expressing her hope that Philip would be pleased by how affairs were developing in France. She showed a recognition that in addition to satisfying Philip in relation to France, he could also take heart of the improvements it would offer him comfort relating to the situation in the Spanish Netherlands. The historian Garrisson-Estèbe by contrast characterises the battle as a draw.

The Protestants likewise celebrated the battle as a victory. The contemporary Protestant historian, Agrippa d'Aubigné wrote that the Protestants skirmishing the day after the battle could also be argued as a sign of their victory. The massive disparity in numbers in favour of the royalists made the survival of their army a God given victory, according to their propaganda. In the work Chanson de la bataille donnee entre Paris & Sainct-Denys the courage of Condé, Coligny and Genlis were celebrated in anonymous octonaires. Thanksgiving services were held in cities under their control, and a public holiday was declared in Montauban and Saint-Antonin. In Montpellier, the baron d'Acier ordered public celebrations. The chief victory of the battle for these celebrators was the death of the constable de Montmorency, the virulently Catholic former 'Triumvir', the wider course of the battle was of less interest.

In a conversation with Álava, which transpired shortly after the battle, the Queen Mother expressed that her greatest desire at this moment was for a truce. Álava, showing her a letter from the duke of Alba, coaxed her onwards to see to what he believed she had agreed to at the Bayonne Interview: the decapitation of the Protestant leadership, and the dismissal of the chancellor L'Hôpital. He raised the spectre of God’s wrath for failure to accomplish these things. Catherine assured him she would look to accomplish this latter matter soon, but now was not the appropriate moment, and that the former proposal was out of her hands.

At some point in December, Charles requested of the local judiciary of the kingdom that they inventory the nobles both loyalist and rebellious who had returned to their provinces after the battle of Saint-Denis. These men were to be chastised as to the harm their behaviour caused.

=== Lieutenant-general ===
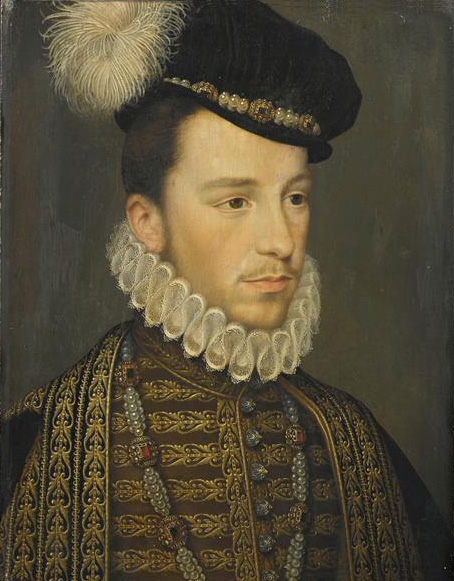
Duc d'Anjou, brother of king Charles IX who upon the death of the constable de Montmorency would be made lieutenant-general of the kingdom, and leader of the royal army

The constable died two days later after the battle of his injuries. He was granted an elaborate funeral by Catherine at Notre-Dame-de-Paris. Participating in the funeral procession were many of Montmorency's prominent sons-in-law, the king's brother the duc d'Alençon, the cardinal de Bourbon, the duc de Longueville, and various prelates and knights of the royal order. Catherine and the king watched from a scaffold. An effigy was made for the occasion that even modelled his facial wounds. His heart was then buried in the Celestine convent alongside that of king Henri II with whom he had been so close. The Spanish ambassador Álava, who had held deep suspicions of Montmorency's religious inclinations, celebrated his death in a letter to Philip as a 'true miracle from god'. According to Álava, the Protestants were not alone in celebrating the Constable's death, and the seigneur de Monluc, embittered by a personal grievance with Montmorency, wrote to Catherine that he was glad the Constable was now in hell, and that only the cardinal de Lorraine was now missing there. Monluc would later be compelled to retract this statement. Álava also critiqued Montmorency for his attitude in these letters, in his correspondence with the duke of Alba through late December and early January 1568. For her part, Catherine wrote to Philip that she was thankful no other great noble other than the Constable had died during the battle. Despite this proclamation, Montmorency was not the only prominent death of the battle. The Protestant's lost the vidame d'Amiens, the comte de Sault and the comte de La Suze. The future maréchal de France, the seigneur de Sanssac was among the few prominent royalist wounded.

With the death of the constable de Montmorency, the position of Constable of France fell vacant. It would not be filled again until 1593. The importance of the charge required a noble of complete loyalty, in addition to military prowess. Charles asserted no one was required to fill the space Montmorency left. Catherine disagreed.

It was inappropriate for Charles himself to take on leadership of the army with Montmorency's death for several reasons. In the neo-platonic conception of the monarchy, which was in fashion at the time, the King was the soother of troubles. Further, if he were to himself fight rebels, it would be to dignify them with an undeserved importance. Thus, it would be the job of his brother, the duc d'Anjou, to deal with Condé's army. This did not mean Charles did not wish to involve himself actively in military affairs. He announced to the duc de Nevers on 15 November his desire to make for Champagne so that he might come face to face with the reiters that Condé had recruited. His council succeeded, with some difficulty, in dissuading him from taking this course.

=== Anjou in command ===
It was decided in council on 14 November to elevate the duc d'Anjou to the position of lieutenant-general of the kingdom. Charles signed the letters patent but backdated them to 12 November so that there would be no interregnum in the holding of supreme military command. This commission noted that he was already the chef de notre conseil and lieutenant-général. In the absence of a Constable, this role made him the sole leader of the royal army (as Pernot puts it, the 'commander in chief'). As Anjou was heir presumptive to the French crown, he could be assured to devote himself solely to the interests of the crown. Beyond this, royal power was also delegated to the lieutenant-general in any place in which Charles himself could not act.

The charge of lieutenant-general of the kingdom had not been occupied since the death of the duc de Guise, François in 1563. Catherine thought this a prudent course given the jealous nature of the leading families of the kingdom that hungered for the office of Constable. Indeed, the new duc de Montmorency (the maréchal de Montmorency) angled to have himself made the second in command to the new lieutenant-general, thereby acting as a continuator to the office of Constable that his father had held. As the most senior of the maréchaux, having been appointed in 1559, logic dictated that in the absence of royal command of the army or that of a Constable, control of the military would have defaulted to him. Injurious to his prospects to achieve this command were the fact he was a first cousin of the rebel Châtillon brothers and was seen as being soft on Protestantism. Hoping to force the queen's hand on this front, he and his brothers, along with other princes, threatened to depart court. Similarly angling for the job was the duc de Nemours. Having played an important role in saving the King at Meaux, and with much military accomplishment to his name, he felt the job rightly his. Spurned from the position of lieutenant-general he was outraged, and withdrew from the royal council. Charles had first considered the late duc de Guise's brother, the duc d'Aumale, for the position of deputy to the duc d'Anjou. This had been stringently opposed by the four Montmorency brothers who threatened to defy Aumale's authority if he was put in such a position and therefore the king dropped the idea. Aumale then retired to Champagne in disgust. The duc de Montpensier, duc de Nemours, duc de Longueville and duc d'Aumale looked to see the seigneur de Sanssac receive the charge of Anjou's deputy. The maréchaux baulked at this proposal, threatening to depart court, much as the Montmorency had done.

Rather than a single figure, to assist the duc d'Anjou in his new military career three military advisors were chosen: the duc de Nemours (who had recently married Anne d'Este and thus affixed himself to the Lorraine family); the duc de Montpensier (a Bourbon counterweight to the Lorraine aligned Nemours but also a virulent Catholic); and the maréchal de Cossé (a moderate Catholic selected to ensure that the Montmorency family did not feel left out in the cold). Cossé (formerly known by his title as the seigneur de Gonnor) was a recent elevation to the Marshalate. In the contemporary writer Brantôme's opinion, Catherine afforded her son the maréchal de Cossé as an advisor because he would oppose following a firm course against the Protestants. These three men got on poorly with one another, and were not good strategists. Anjou, still young, lacked the gravitas to settle the disputes between his honour sensitive advisers. Nemours was discontented that he did not have sole command of the army. As a result, Charles would have to write to him on 17 January 1568 to soothe him and make it clear that it was the King's intention that his brother enjoyed command of the army, but that he would be advised by princes (like Nemours) and seigneurs.

As the role of lieutenant-general made him not just the commander of the military but also the alter-ego of the king, Anjou also enjoyed a council of his own. In this council were the duc de Montpensier, Montpensier's son the prince dauphin d'Auvergne, the duc de Nemours, the duc de Longueville, the seigneur de Méru (one of the late constable de Montmorency's sons), the duc d'Anjou's personal governor Carnavalet, one of the captains of the Scottish guard de Losses, the marquis de Villars, and his future favourite the seigneur de Villequier. Also present were the duc d'Aumale and the four maréchaux. The king was involved in the composition of Anjou's war council. He advised his brother on 1 March 1568 to see the comte de Radan, who Charles rated as a worthy figure, included in his council.

By letter of 13 November 1567, Fourquevaux mused that there were no divisions in France too strong to be overcome by the unifying force of a war with Spain.

The role the King had in mind for the cardinal de Lorraine in the conflict was of great displeasure to the latter figure. He wrote to Charles on 16 November that as the king clearly did not think him a worthy figure, that he allow him to retire to his estates while a younger man take over his place.

=== Establishing command ===
From his appointment until the end of the conflict, Anjou would write 125 letters, of which around a quarter were for the attentions of the court.

Anjou appeared before the parlement of Paris on 17 November, where he took an oath. The next day he wrote to the duc de Nevers, appraising him of his new command, and noting he would do his utmost to satisfy the King. The seigneur de Matignon received a letter with the same message. There was fractious dispute over the various positions in his army. The duc de Montpensier was granted command of the army's vanguard, as a prince du sang. This offended the other leaders, who wished this position for the maréchal de Montmorency. Damville asserted that by rights of seniority, command of the armies battle should go to him. The Montmorency brothers complained of the poor recognition shown their service, and their father's wounds, threatening to take their leave.

Writing to Pope Pius V on 22 November, the duc d'Anjou noted that he had to take the occasion of the sending of Charles sending a certain Annibal Rouchelay to the Pontiff to write him. He assured the Pope that no other prince would be devoted to the preservation of the Catholic religion as he. He informed the Pope of his new charge, and that he was regretful for the military opportunities that had been squandered since his appointment as lieutenant-general (something he had told Annibal to discuss with Pius V). He protested that he was inexperienced, and subject to the advice of those around him.

While Anjou was still in the capital, the Spanish ambassador Álava came to visit him. Álava offered the complements of king Philip on his being appointed to the charge. The young prince expressed his joy to the ambassador that his first taste of war would be to fight the enemies of God and the King.

The Paris militia that had been raised would be of little use for a pursuit of the Protestants across France and the royal army began to look to raise new forces to supplement the duc d'Anjou. Around 3,000 infantry and 1,500 cavalry brought to join the royal army by the lieutenant-general of Brittany, seigneur de Martigues, arrived in late November. The crown also ordered the raising of fifty new companies of cavalry.

== International aid ==
=== Royalist ===
At first, Charles imagined that he might be able to restore control over the domestic situation without turning to Spain for military support. He noted by despatch of 28 September to Fourquevaux that Álava had approached him on 27 September with offers of support, for which Fourquevaux was to thank Philip, but decline, as the French king commanded enough strength to suppress the troubles on his own. It quickly became apparent that support from the French provinces would be slow in arriving, and this forced a re-evaluation of the Spanish offer.

==== Spain ====
No sooner had she arrived in Paris, than Catherine began sending out foreign diplomatic feelers to the Catholic powers. The Spanish ambassador Álava, Margaret of Parma and the duke of Alba all made promises of military aid. In the audience of 6 November he enjoyed with Philip, the Spanish King endorsed for Fourquevaux these outreach efforts, expressing satisfaction at the conduct of Alba, Álava, and Margaret in proffering their aid to the French. He made it clear that were he in France he would devote himself to the fight, but that generally speaking he was keen to devote all that he possessed to aiding Charles. Despite these lofty words, Gellard believes Philip never considered sending more than a couple of thousand soldiers to support the French crown.

Catherine sought 2,000 cavalrymen from the duke of Alba, though subsequently moderated this number. Margaret of Parma promised to dispatch 1,600 cavalry from the Spanish Netherlands, this offer was accepted by the French crown. Charles recorded his acceptance of this aid to Fourquevaux in a letter of 10 October. Alongside the 1,600 heavy cavalry (gendarmes) were a further 400 light cavalry. These reinforcements would arrive under the command of the count of Arenberg and count of Meghem. Writing to both the comte de Chaulnes and d'Humières on 13 October, Charles instructed them to receive the Spanish as friends. They were to ensure the Spanish were feasted and lacked for nothing while they were in Picardy. Charles entrusted his bastard half-brother, the chevalier d'Angoulême with welcoming the Spanish soldiers of the count of Arenberg. This role was granted to Angoulême over the hesitation of the queen mother Catherine. The expeditionary force preceded Arenberg into France, arriving on 13 November. Arenberg himself crossed the frontier on 25 November, from the Spanish Netherlands. Welcoming Arenberg represented a significant responsibility for the bastard Angoulême, due to the mission's diplomatic as well as military dimensions. His soldiers nearing Paris, Arenberg would hurry on ahead of his soldiers, so that he might kiss the King's hand. The cavalry that Arenberg led would remain in France until April 1568, in sum the duration of the war. Three months' worth of pay was provided for the soldiers by the Spanish.

In a letter of 10 October to the French crown, Fourquevaux noted that it was his impression the Spanish would not mourn the prospect of the civil disturbances in France being prolonged.

These would be the only soldiers provided by the Spanish during the second war of religion. Nevertheless, Alba assured Charles that if his situation besieged in the capital became a dire one, he would head into France at the head of an army. He also offered a further 5,000 infantry. This offer was viewed sceptically and suspiciously by the French court, and ultimately Catherine refused the suggestion. In addition to aid in soldiers, Alba also offered aid in information, appraising the French of troops levied in the Holy Roman Empire, such as he was aware of them. Such intelligence liaisons would link the Spanish Netherlands, France and Spain well through this period.

Though she didn't want such a sizable contingent of Spanish infantry entering the country, this did not mean Catherine did not see military value in Alba. She hoped rather that the duke might hire reiters to the end of intimidating the elector Palatine into backing down from his support of the rebel Protestants. From October to December, she also wanted to see the cream of the Spanish mounted arquebusier force enter France. Angry at Alba's reticence, she threatened to make peace with the Protestants with him to blame for the affair if the French did not receive this force before the German mercenaries of the Protestant's showed up. Alba stayed resolute in his refusal.

In letter of 13 January 1568 to Philip, the cardinal de Lorraine requested that the duke of Alba be put in a position to render effective military assistance to the French Catholic cause. He complained that despite their pleas to the duke of Alba, and Philip's commands to his subordinate, no Spanish soldier had set foot in France. Alba demurred on the grounds that he did not have troops to spare, offering only reiters, which the cardinal de Lorraine was uninterested in receiving any more of. Therefore, he requested of Philip that he bolster his garrisons in the Spanish Netherlands such that soldiers might be freed up by the duke of Alba. He urged Philip himself to come north to revenge himself against 'heresy and blasphemy'. It is from the start of 1568 that the cardinal de Lorraine settled into a rhythm of regular correspondence with the Spanish sovereign. He even floated the possibility of Philip succeeding to the French throne through his wife, should Charles and his brothers die, describing the prohibitions of Salic law as a 'pleasantry'. After one of his valets was murdered, he took more care in what he put to paper.

==== Switzerland ====
A new levy of 4,000 Swiss was undertaken by the crown. The French ambassador in Switzerland, Bellièvre was to see this force to Chalon, from where it could be brought to join the main royal army by the lieutenant-general of Burgundy, the seigneur de Tavannes. In contrast with Italian mercenaries, Swiss mercenaries were primarily infantry who used pikes as opposed to arquebusiers. Such a weapon preference favoured large scale manoeuvres over individual actions. Arquebuses were more expensive, lacked accuracy over long ranges, and took about a minute to reload. The advantage of such weapons over pikes came in mobility and autonomy.

==== Italy ====
===== Savoy =====
Catherine leant on the duke of Savoy to provide the aid he had promised. The duc de Nevers was asked to raise several thousand soldiers from Piedmont.

In November, the duke of Savoy expressed his openness to the provision of a thousand men and was pleased to know these granted soldiers would be put under the command of his relative, the duc de Nemours.

Italian soldiers would be received by the royalists from Savoy.

===== Ferrara =====
From the duke of Ferrara, she sought the release of 100,000 écus that was due to be credited to him for his pension, a request that was granted.

===== Florence =====
The Queen Mother looked to her cousin, the duke of Florence to provide between 100,000 and 200,000 écus (crowns).

In correspondence with the duke of Florence of 8 October 1567, Catherine proposed that the duke dispatch to France his third son, Pietro, so that he might be granted an advantageous match with the heiress Marie de Clèves, who was then in the household of the Protestant queen of Navarre. Through this marriage, the property of the Clèves heiress could be maintained in Catholic hands, rather than falling to the Protestant party. She analogised the advantages she would afford Pietro favourably to the benevolence the French crown had shown another Italian, Louis de Gonzague, who had married Marie's elder sister Henriette and become a French ducal peer as the duc de Nevers. For a man of her blood, as Pietro was, Catherine invited the Florentine to imagine how much more favour still she might show. For Catherine, Pietro offered the possibility of the acquisition of a new loyalist to the crown at a sensitive moment of civil war when the political base of the crown was narrowed.

A certain Julien del Bene would be entrusted with an extraordinary diplomatic mission to Florence during the winter of 1567.

Though he had promised much, in the opinion of king Charles, the duke of Florence would not deliver.

===== Papacy =====
Similar requests for money went to pope Pius V for up to 300,000 écus through the banker Annibal Ruccellai. Pope Pius assented to the raising of this fund through the employment of half an annate (the annual income of clerical land in France) or the sale of church property. Delighted at the thought of a war on Protestantism, he further proffered 25,000 écus and offered 6,000 soldiers.

In the wake of the battle of Saint-Denis, the Pope became little inclined to proffer financial support to the French crown, lest it be devoted to another end than the fight against heresy. He further demanded, through his nuncio della Torre, that Catherine dismiss the chancellor de L'Hôpital and the maréchal de Montmorency, while funnelling money to the cardinal de Lorraine. Pius advised Catherine to put her faith in the duc d'Anjou, under the guidance of Catholic captains.

Catherine reassured the Pope on 20 November, that there was too much at stake for the kingdom, her honour and her salvation to contemplate offering satisfaction to the Protestants.

===== Venice =====
Ruccellai travelled from Rome to Venice, where he found the Venetian Senate far less willing to open their purse to the French crown.

The Venetian ambassador expressed to Catherine his deep sympathy of the plight of the French crown. The queen mother responded that this was only natural given the close ties that bound their two realms. She entreated him to write back to Venice seeking aid for France, recalling that which was provided during the first civil war. She noted that France would be in Venice's debt for such favour, and that they would intervene favourably for Venice with the Ottomans. The Venetian ambassador wrote back on a conversation he had with Catherine on 5 November. He had expressed concern about the Ottoman threat to Venice. The Republic was thus proving reluctant to proffer financial support to France. Catherine urged Correro, and the Venetians onwards, noting that surely once France had emerged from its troubles, it would shower Venice with favours and assistance. She highlighted that she was an Italian and owed a particular debt to the Republic and would see to its security.

The queen mother moved on to expressing her astonishment at the audaciousness of the Protestant conspiracy, something which had never before been seen. She expressed her confidence that its failure presaged the conspirator's doom. Correro reassured her that the king's loyal subjects were bound together and would soon triumph. Catherine's mood then darkened, as she highlighted the bonds of kinship which crossed the divide between the loyalists and the rebels. Correro then inquired of her whether she foresaw the rebels receiving any foreign aid. Catherine speculated that only England and Germany were possible sources for the Protestant rebels. England was not a threat in this regard, the French ambassador there reporting Elizabeth's distaste for the rebellion. From the latter place, 4,000 reiters were anticipated. These mercenaries had not begun to march, and she stated regardless, they would not gain entry into France.

In another discussion with Correro of 31 December, the ambassador urged the Queen Mother to pursue a total victory, for the sake of Catholicism. Partial peace might be acceptable between princes, but between a prince and his subjects a complete capitulation was the only satisfactory conclusion. Catherine responded by noting how tightly bound France and the Republic were. She went on to recount a potted history of the first French War of Religion, the battle of Dreux, the death of Guise and her decision to make peace. This was borne of the need to stop the killing, with the opinion that the hatreds that had fostered the conflict were more personal ones than religious and would fade in time. Her narrative then moved on to the second war, characterising the Protestant uprising as one less concerned with religion than imposing law upon the king. The Protestants had been defeated at Saint-Denis, but in the negotiations afterwards, had always found excuse to delay agreement, even after receiving all they could hope for in peace offers. She outlined the anticipated imminent destruction of the Protestant army, and the effort that the commanders in the field had gone to, including her son who had ridden through the night in full armour. If, despite all this effort to triumph peace did come, it would be forced upon Catherine by her council, as she was firmly opposed to compromise. Correro heaped praise on Catherine, and expressed his hope for a single Catholic religion to be established in France.

Charles would ultimately find the Venetians too distracted by other matters to offer much in the way of support.

==== Holy Roman Empire ====
Just as the Protestant rebels would look to secure German mercenary reiters, so too did the royalists.

Reiters were a fairly recent type of pistol wielding form of cavalry from Germany, that the Protestant soldier La Noue argued was superior to the French gendarmerie. These soldiers were mounted on common horses, with blackened armour so that the production process might be made quicker. Such mercenaries fought infantry in small squadrons, being careful not to become engaged. Each reiter carried several pistols, which they reloaded while on the move. The reiters were seen as valuable by the royal army also, due not only to their supposed fighting prowess, but also their ability to shield the gendarmerie from sustaining heavy casualties against the deep columns of Protestant mercenaries.

===== Mission of the bishop of Rennes =====
The bishop of Rennes, former French ambassador to the Holy Roman Emperor, was entrusted with raising a levy of reiters, and dissuading support for the Protestant cause among German princes. The bishop saw favourable prospects with the duke of Saxony, but found himself stuck in the French city of Verdun around 21 October.

From Heidelberg on 1 November, the bishop of Rennes reported that he had enjoyed favourable discussions with the duke of Saxe-Weimar who was willing to devote 2,400 reiters to the royalist cause as soon as possible. The only prospective problem would be in the provision of money, as the bishop was not sure whether Saxe-Weimar would be willing to advance the money until the French could provide it. He therefore looked to see 50,000 livres provided, which would need to be sent to the governor of Metz, maréchal de Vielleville. He hoped that there would be no cause for dispute with the duke of Saxony, who could be a great friend of the French, over the raising of these troops, despite the dispute between Saxony and the colonel of the French reiters.

The bishop of Rennes warned Charles against using the service of captains who were persona non grata with the Holy Roman Emperor Maximilian II and the duke of Saxony. He noted in a despatch of 19 November that the duke of Württemberg had learned that the French crown were employing a certain captain Mandesloh. Mandesloh had been in the service of the rival claimant to the duchy of Saxony, John Frederick during the Gotha War. By using the service of Mandesloh, Charles risked alienating the Elector of Saxony from favouring him or even driving him into the rebel Protestant camp. The bishop explained that he understood why Charles had taken this course, as the duke of Saxe-Weimar was slow in raising his levies. Nevertheless, he argued against it.

By letter of 9 December, Charles expressed confusion at the rumour that he had taken Mandesloh into his employ. The bishop of Rennes was to assure the Elector of Saxony that Mandesloh was not in French service. The king was not lacking in prospective captains, chief among whom was the duke of Saxe-Weimar, and had no need to turn to such men.

By this same letter, the bishop of Rennes was instructed to go and meet with the duke of Saxe-Weimar to oversee the prospective raising of the reiters. Saxe-Weimar had written to the bishop in confusion as to why he had not yet received the order to raise them from king Charles. This induced fear in Rennes that Charles might have backed out of the hiring of these forces. Arriving in Weimar, the bishop of Rennes would find word from the king, who emphasised the importance of the Saxe-Weimar mercenaries being ready simultaneously with the Protestant mercenaries of the Elector Palatine. The bishop of Rennes wrote frustratedly back to Charles on 15 December that if the king had dispatched another figure to Weimar while he was consumed with other business, this might have indeed been possible. He protested that it was not possible for him to be in two places simultaneously. He implored Charles to ratify the treaty he had undertaken with the duke of Saxe-Weimar with all possible haste, noting that he was a prisoner of the duke until its signing.

Concerning the attitude of the Emperor, the bishop of Rennes was fundamentally pessimistic. He noted that Maximilian had done his best to dissuade the duke of Alba from proffering support to the royalist cause in France. Further, he was given to understand the Emperor had informed the son of the Elector Palatine, John Casimir that his invasion of France in support of the Protestants was his own business, and not one that aroused the ire of Maximilian. Charles put little stock in the outlook of the bishop of Rennes concerning Maximilian. In the king's opinion, Maximilian remained an ally, and he tasked the comte de Fiesque with explaining to Maximilian that the French struggle against their rebels was one common to all princes.

There was concern in the royal camp about the 5,000 reiters that the duke of Saxony was meant to be providing for the king's cause. On route, the duke had made a stop at the territory of his father-in-law, the Elector Palatine. It was feared that the duke's father-in-law might have convinced him either to cease his progress, or even worse join with the Count Palatine's son John Casimir and throw his lot in with the Protestants. Charles wrote to his brother, who was leading the royal army in the field, with this fearful news on 1 February.

In addition to the duke of Saxony's reiters, the royal army also looked to receive a force led by Bassompierre and the Count Rhinegrave who had won over the margrave of Baden-Baden to the royalist cause in January 1568. Indeed, the duc d'Anjou had reported on their defection from John Casimir's army on 13 January, advising Charles to bring the margrave of Baden-Baden into French royal service, while reporting that the Rhinegrave and Bassompierre were coming already to provide him support. On the same day he advised Catherine of the letters he had received from Baden-Baden and Vielleville on the former's defection, as well as appraising her of the movements of the duke of Saxony's force. The king hoped that the arrival of these forces with Anjou would bolster him sufficiently until the duke of Saxony turned up.

Writing to the French court on 27 February, Schomberg was able to report that the mercenary levy that the crown had raised was now ready, waiting only for the word from Charles to take to their horses. If the crown did not take their employ, Schomberg warned that they would go into the employ of the duke of Holstein who was a pensionary of Elizabeth I of England.

In sum, the royalists would receive 8,000 reiters from the duke of Saxony, the troops arriving while the army was back in Paris.

==== Slow arrival ====
On 16 January, Anjou wrote to Catherine again on the subject of the German mercenaries. He noted that he had received, and was forwarding, communiques from the maréchal de Vielleville, and the duke of Saxony. He had been informed that the duke of Zweibrücken and the count of Nassau were vexed by the damages done to their lands by John Casimir's reiters and were seeking revenge. Anjou noted that he had written to the duke of Lorraine, who he felt was even more impacted by the passage of the reiters, to urge him to act similarly. Anjou also counselled the maréchal de Vielleville to do his all to keep these various aggrieved princes in this state of mind so as to trouble John Casimir most severely. In a related request, Anjou sought to ensure that the payment required for the duke of Saxony's men was sent forward. He noted that he had commanded Pasquier to move no further forward than Verdun until such time as the payment arrived.

Two days later, Anjou made a request of the seigneur de Puygaillard to send forward the reiters of Bassompierre without waiting for those of the count Rhinegrave.

On 28 January, Anjou alerted Charles to the fact he had told the maréchal de Vielleville he was free to undertake negotiations with the margrave of Baden-Baden.

Unsure what to believe, the duc d'Anjou wrote to Pasquier on 30 January to find out whether there was merit to what the duc d'Aumale had told him, that Saxony and the Rhinegrave's forces had crossed the Rhine and united on the far bank. Come 3 February, Anjou would write directly to the duke of Saxony. He expressed his appreciation for the sincere friendship of the duke for France. He noted that they were eagerly awaiting the arrival of the duke's troops, and that he desired their arrival with all possible haste so that the rampant pillage and destruction of the Protestant army that was marauding through the kingdom could be brought to an end.

To facilitate the arrival of the forces of the Rhinegrave, Anjou wrote to seigneur d'Espaulx on 4 February to receive them at Mouzon, and bring them to Troyes. While writing to the duc de Nemours on 12 February, Anjou appraised the latter that he had received word from Charles and the maréchal de Vielleville that the duke of Saxony was closing in on Metz, and would be able to link up with the royal army in between twelve and fifteen days.

In correspondence with the seigneur de Pasquier on 15 February, Anjou gave orders for the guard of the money intended for the duke of Saxony until such time as Saxony arrived in Château-Thierry.

Anjou was again chasing the location of the seigneur de Bassompierre on 21 February, eager for his support. He did this both by directly writing to Bassompierre and through writing to Puygaillard. He was also anxious to receive the forces of the duke of Saxony, with Pasquier urged to hurry him along.

On 23 February, Charles reported to his ambassador in Spain, the baron de Fourquevaux, that 3,000 of the duke of Saxony's reiters had made the crossing over the river Meuse three days previous. Close to the wars end, on 6 March, the duc d'Anjou wrote to the seigneur de Mauvissière to deplore the fact that poor conditions on the road had delayed the progress of the duke of Saxony's soldiers. Anjou complained, on 11 March, to Pasquier of the pretexts for delay of the arrival of Saxony, the Rhinegrave and the margrave of Baden-Baden. He asked that Pasquier do what he could to resolve their excuses.

=== Holy Roman Empire ===
==== A new landscape ====
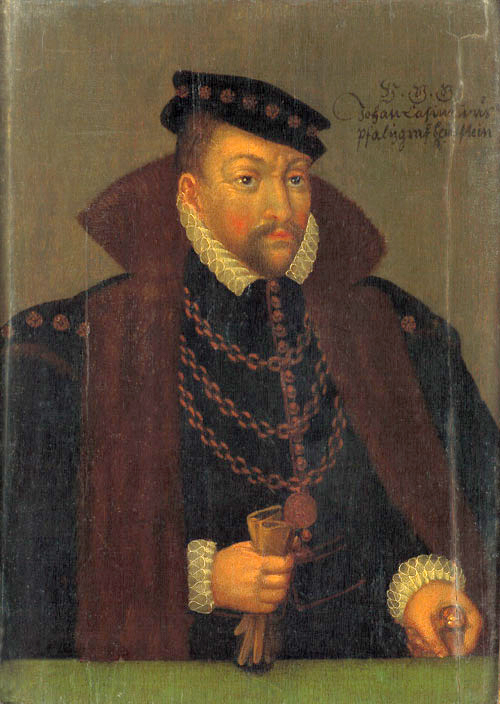
John Casimir, son of Frederick III, Elector Palatine and leader of the German mercenary force that would support the rebel Protestants during the Second War of Religion

Well aware that alone they could not well resist the royal army without foreign soldiers and funds, Protestant representatives were sent into the Holy Roman Empire at the outbreak of the conflict. The Protestant rebel leaders hoped to implement a more coherent and organised foreign policy than they had during the first French War of Religion, where a vast number of representatives (twenty-seven in total) were sent out in an incoherent fashion. By 1567, the Protestant leadership enjoyed long running relations with various allies. A far smaller number of representatives were sent out than had been during the first war. The agents who were sent out functioned as de facto ambassadors. The historian Daussy sees this as an evolution in the rebel Protestant diplomatic approach favouring a more efficient and lean outreach. The baron de Lux, who the French crown had sent into the Holy Roman Empire to frustrate the Protestants, argued that at first the Protestant outreach justified their rebellion against the French crown on the grounds of tyranny and the public good, but that these justifications were disagreeable to the German princes. Seeing little success in this, the Protestants had switched to justifying their rebellion on religious grounds and enjoyed more success in this manner.

The situation in the Empire was different to that it had been in 1562. Hesse, which had represented the chief pillar of German support for the Protestants in the first civil war, had, upon the death of its landgrave Philip in March 1567, been split among his four heirs. The principal part of the territory (Hesse-Kassel) went to his eldest, William who, while sympathetic to French Protestantism, preferred a peaceable relationship. Worse still for the Protestants, since the start of 1567 he had been enrolled as a pensionary of the French crown, receiving 4,000 florins (a gold coin) annually. Conversely, the Elector Palatine Frederick, who had proved highly cautious about proffering support in the first civil war, had, in 1563, imposed a modified version of Calvinism in his lands, known as the Heidelberg Catechism. In his close circle of advisors were several ardent interventionists keen to support both the French and Dutch Protestants. Though his eldest son Louis remained a Lutheran, his second son John Casimir shared his father's newfound Calvinism. The abandonment of Lutheranism earned the Palatinate the ire of the other Protestant princes of the Holy Roman Empire. In 1566, this escalated to the possibility of placing the Palatinate under the Imperial ban (Reichsacht). This engendered a bitterness towards the Augsburg settlement not shared by the other Protestant Electors (Augustus of Saxony and Joachim of Brandenburg). Thus, maintaining cordial relations with the Catholic sovereigns of Europe, and the Holy Roman Emperor, was less of a priority for the Palatinate.

The Elector of Saxony, and many other Lutheran Protestant princes (such as the duke of Württemberg and Hesse) did not consider the French and Dutch Calvinist Protestants to be true Protestants like the Lutherans. Nevertheless, the Elector supported moderation in their treatment and opposed the proposal of the Imperial Ban against the Palatinate in the 1566 diet. The Elector was in conflict with his cousin, the duke of Saxe-Weimar, who followed a strict Lutheranism that Augustus found distasteful. It was thus hoped, that the Elector might be persuaded to be sympathetic to the French Protestants, especially given he had several advisors who were looking to push him in that direction. Indeed, negotiations were presently underway for the Elector's daughter, Elisabeth to marry the son of the Elector Palatine John Casimir, a project of these Calvinist sympathetic advisors. Through this, it was hoped the two Electors might be brought together, and with them Protestantism in the Empire. This offered hopes to those who looked for a new sympathy towards French Protestantism from Saxony. With Augustus' sympathy might follow that of many other German princes.

Thus, the prime target for the Protestants would be the Palatinate. Hesse-Kassel was pointedly ignored. When, at the start of October, the Protestant leadership were drawing up letters of credence for their representative, a certain seigneur de Malmedy he was not tasked with visiting Kassel, but rather Stuttgart and Heidelberg.

==== Württemberg ====
The duke of Württemberg, to whom the seigneur de Malmedy had been sent, proved to be evasive in providing support. He was keen to gauge whether the Protestants had truly risen up solely for reasons of religious oppression. To this end, he dispatched a certain Pier Paolo Vergerio to Paris to get the sense of things. Vergerio was greeted coldly by Catherine and Charles in his audience of 14 November. They feared Württemberg providing aid to the Protestants. Despite this negative experience with the French crown, the Duke remained aloof from providing any support.

==== Palatinate ====
When the Protestants sent out their second diplomatic mission in November, this time led by Chastelier-Portault, they ignored Württemberg, focusing all their energies on the Palatinate. Even the Elector Palatine was somewhat concerned by the mixture of political and religious demands made by the Protestant rebels. To gauge the true intentions of the prince de Condé, he dispatched Wenzel Zuleger to France. Zuleger arrived at the French court in December. This representative met with the King, the Queen Mother, and then spent eleven days in the Protestant camp. At the French court, Zulegar was shown a list of Condé's initial demands. It subsequently became apparent to Zuleger that while initially the Protestants might have made a series of highly political demands, their focus now was on their liberty of worship. His report on this convinced the Elector that Condé's motives were just. Despite endorsing this, the Elector Palatine absolved Charles personally of responsibility for the ill state of affairs, placing the blame on 'corrupt advisers' around the sovereign.

The Protestants secured the military aid of the Elector Palatine, who entrusted his son, John Casimir with providing military support. Renaudeau sees the involvement of the Palatine for the Protestant cause as more a cynical business venture, than anything driven by religious solidarity. Casimir would bring to bear 8,000 reiters, and 3,000 landsknechts. The composition of the landsknecht mercenaries was around two-thirds pikemen and one-third arquebusiers.

For the levying of these mercenaries, Condé pledged 50,000 écus of his family's jewels, as well as those of his late wife, Éléonore de Roye.

A letter from the Elector Palatine to Charles expressed sympathy for the rebels inside the French kingdom. Frederick opined that Charles would do well to allow for the liberty of religion in his lands to preserve their harmony. Charles responded by stating that the uprising was not against religious oppression. He had, in his telling, confirmed the edict of Amboise. He pointed to the rebel manifesto as proof it was intended to dictate the governance of his kingdom to him. In a letter of 19 January 1568, Frederick dismissed the notion that the rebellion was a political one, as Charles' representatives had alleged. He noted that uncritically believing this, many German princes had thought ill of him [Frederick] for allowing his son to participate in the war. Frederick's investigations had concluded that it was a matter of religious liberty, and therefore he could not be blamed for allowing his son to come to Condé's succour.

=== Royalist counter-diplomacy ===
The crown worked to conduct a diplomatic counter offensive in the Empire, and to this end sent various representatives to gauge the plans of the various German princes and dissuade them from providing support if possible. This operation was handled sloppily, with many inexperienced representatives being sent out in a scattered approach.

The French crown worked hard to characterise the Protestant leadership as rebels, in the hope of dissuading foreign actors from entertaining supporting them. Where the Protestant ambassadors were welcomed, it was in a circumspect fashion, lacking in grandeur. The Protestants themselves, through the downplaying of the religious reasons for their rebellion, dampened enthusiasm in some quarters of the Empire.

==== Seigneur de Lignerolles ====
The seigneur de Lignerolles was dispatched to the court of the Elector Palatine, with whom he attained an audience. Despite the proximity in relations between the French Protestants and the Elector Palatine, Lignerolles took the Elector's assurances of good friendship towards the French crown at face value. By contrast, when the bishop of Rennes met with the Elector Palatine, he walked away with the sense his time was being wasted, and that the Elector, and his son, were both resolved to support the rebel Protestant cause.

Meeting with the duke of Württemberg, Lignerolles found him full throated in his friendship of the French sovereign. Despite this, Lignerolles committed a faux pas, presenting a letter from the duke of Alba to Württemberg, something the bishop of Rennes would later identify as having been inappropriate. As a result of this, Württemberg took on a harsh tone with Lignerolles. The bishop of Rennes identified the problem here as being the sending out of many diplomatic representatives to accomplish the same objective without being in contact with one another. It would always be the case that one representative would find it prudent to remain silent on a matter another thought it wise to mention, and this diversity of approaches would instill distrust among those they intended to negotiate with.

In his meeting with the Holy Roman Emperor, Maximilian II, Lignerolles reported to Charles that he could be well satisfied by the assurances he had been given by the Emperor. Maximilian would be as responsive to the French request to prohibit German aid to the Protestants as he had been with king Philip's similar request concerning the Spanish Netherlands. Further, Maximilian had assured Lignerolles that the French crown had nothing to fear from the duke of Saxony, the marquis of Brandenburg or the landgraves of Hesse.

==== Comte de Fiesque ====
The comte de Fiesque warned Catherine on 6 December that mustering was under way in the lands of the Elector Palatine per word he had received from Maximilian.

==== Baron de Luxe ====
The Protestant, but royalist, baron de Lux enjoyed meetings with the duke of Saxony and the margrave of Hesse. On his return, which he intended to conduct as quickly as possible, he was informed that all the border places and passages between France and Lorraine were held by men of the prince de Condé. Despite this danger, Lux was resolved to continue his passage into France. It was only when he received word from the bishop of Rennes, who had arrived in Heidelberg, that he was of more use to the French king in Germany, that he resolved to stay in the Empire. In his letter back to the French court of 28 October, he noted that the duke of Saxony and the duke of Saxe-Weimar were well-disposed towards Charles. The latter had even explained to the baron that he was eager to put himself in French service at the first opportunity. Nevertheless, the news was not all so good, he had learned of the commission the prince de Condé had issued in the Empire, which was for '6,000 horse'.

==== Seigneur de Schomberg ====
Another French representative working in the Empire was the naturalised German, Schomberg. In a despatch of 27 February to Catherine, he reported on the evolving attitude of the Elector of Saxony. He noted that in a general sense there was much sympathy for the Protestant cause as the opinion in the country was that Charles intended to re-impose unitary Catholicism upon France, crushing freedom of religion. As a result, many had tried to convince the Elector of Saxony against the French king and were trying to impede military support reaching Charles. Schomberg credited himself with having succeeded in convincing the Elector of Saxony that Charles was no enemy of Protestant worship in his kingdom, and that he had illustrated this by the terms Charles had provided Téligny to give to the prince de Condé. With this about face accomplished, the Elector had embraced the royalist cause and wished to do everything for its favour. Schomberg was also able to report that he had rehabilitated Mandesloh in the eyes of the Elector of Saxony. So complete was this rehabilitation that the Elector would also represent in Mandesloh's favour with the Emperor and other princes of the Empire.

==== Bishop of Rennes ====
The one time bishop of Rennes noted that while only the Elector Palatine supported the Protestant rebellion, many other princes who maintained more circumspect attitudes believed that the Protestants had rebelled due to the fact that toleration was about to be terminated with their faith to be persecuted. Rennes argued that this false rumour could be best disabused if the king himself wrote to the various princes of the Empire to clarify matters.

In a similar case to that at the court of the Elector Palatine, of overlapping missions leading to conflicting reports, in December, the bishop of Rennes felt it necessary to clear up a confusion that had emerged over the figure of a certain Pierre Le Clair, a captain who had hired German mercenaries for the crown during the first civil war. Charles had informed him that Pierre Le Clair was not to be trusted, as letters had shown he was in league with the Protestant rebels. Nevertheless, the maréchal de Vielleville, governor of Metz, had not been appraised of this fact, and was writing letters in favour of the man to the German princes. Resultingly, the bishop of Rennes had to write to Vielleville on the matter on 15 December.

Rennes would conduct his own discussions with Württemberg with the assistance of the Protestant baron de Lux. The bishop of Rennes poured great compliments on the Protestant baron de Lux, informing Charles that while he might be viewed with scepticism by Protestant princes like Württemberg, the presence of their co-religionist Lux was able to slick the wheels of the talks. In his 19 November despatch to Charles, the bishop of Rennes was positive about his talks with the duke of Württemberg. The duke had informed him that all in Germany had distaste for the actions of the Elector Palatine. Württemberg appraised the bishop that the Protestant mercenaries were ready to go on a tighter timetable than the one Rennes had initially provided to Charles. He warned that John Casimir had brought the margrave of Baden-Baden and a brother of the Landgrave of Hesse to his side. In addition to the 6,000 reiters, the bishop of Rennes was informed several companies of landsknechts were also being raised. The duke informed the bishop that he was under a misapprehension concerning a group of reiters that had already entered Lorraine. These were not, as he had thought, royalist reiters under the command of a certain Bassompierre but rather reiters in the service of those hostile to the French crown.

Württemberg was not all supportive words for the French king though. The bishop of Rennes reported that the duke was unsure whether Charles would guarantee freedom of conscience to the Protestants. The bishop of Rennes had assured him that not only was the king committed to freedom of conscience, but also freedom of worship under certain restrictions. The war was a matter of Charles defending himself against intractable Protestants who had resisted attempts to negotiate with unreasonable demands that extended beyond the freedom of worship. Württemberg requested that this assurance was also provided to him from writing in the King's own hand. If this assurance were given then Württemberg, Saxony, and Hesse would work to see France pacified including by cutting off support to the Protestant rebels if they continued the fight regardless.

The duke also expressed his apprehension about the possibility of the Tridentine decrees being received in France. The bishop of Rennes reassured him that the Catholics of France were more opposed to their adoption than Catholics elsewhere, and that even if they were adopted, they would only apply to French Catholics, not French Protestants.

To the embarrassment of the bishop of Rennes, Württemberg also offered to act as a mediator between Charles and the rebel Protestants so that a good peace could be forged. The bishop of Rennes demurred on this proposal, arguing the best way to bring about peace was to cut off the German support to the Protestants. Württemberg was eventually convinced, and he offered to do what he could to stop the German mercenaries coming to the Protestant camp, but noted that this would not be easy. Württemberg, the landgrave of Hesse and the duke of Saxony would meet at Schmalkalden so that they might discuss French affairs, and how best to stop the civil war in the French kingdom spreading like an infection to engulf all of Europe. Württemberg noted that, had the duke John Casimir's preparations for his entry into France been less advanced, they might have been able to call him back from the enterprise at such a meeting. In the circumstances though, he would surely have already crossed the Rhine by then. The bishop of Rennes was similarly pessimistic, believing it was too late to stop the army of John Casimir. He was more hopeful that further recruitment could be contained though.

Charles got back to the bishop of Rennes by despatch of 9 December. He expressed regret over the situation with the seigneur de Lignerolles that Rennes had elaborated on to him. He noted that Lignerolles had exceeded the bounds of his mission, which was to rendezvous with the duke of Alba in Flanders and then head on with any instructions Alba provided into Germany. The king expressed his disappointment in the attitude of the Elector Palatine, as he was a figure that had benefitted from French friendship in the past. As for the invasion of the Elector's son, Charles noted that all they would bring back to Germany with them would be regret. To the assurances Württemberg required, Charles outlined that he had never dreamed of ending the regime of religious tolerance he oversaw, and that the rebellion had nothing to do with matters of religion but was rather an assault on one's sovereign under a pretext. To support the bishop of Rennes, Charles included some articles he had offered the rebels a few days prior as proof of his good attitude on the matter of religion. The bishop of Rennes was to convince the German princes of this. Württemberg's offer to act as an intermediary between Charles and his subjects was politely noted but firmly rejected. Charles noted it was not proper for another prince to have a role in the relations between him and his subjects.

==== Fulda ====
In January, the bishop of Rennes attended the Imperial diet, which was held at Fulda. Emperor Maximilian worked to dissuade the Protestant Imperial princes from supporting the French Protestant cause in this diet. Despite the favour the Emperor, the duke of Saxony, and margrave of Hesse-Kassel showed for the pacification of France, the overall news was not encouraging. These figures wanted to act as intermediaries between Charles and the rebels to bring about peace in France but were unsure whether their services would be welcomed. The bishop of Rennes stated that it was not right for them to mediate between a King and his subjects. Rather Charles desired that they work to bring about the recalling of those German mercenaries that had gone to support the Protestant rebels, and endeavour to see no new levies join with the rebels from the Empire. This included levies like that the bishop of Rennes believed (upon information from the duke of Württemberg) was being undertaken by the queen of England, Elizabeth, in Holstein. The French ambassador reported to Charles that there was great scandal at the diet that Charles had taken captain Mandesloh into his employ. Of particular note, this was to the disquiet of the Emperor, who expressed his disapproval to the bishop. Learning of the bishop of Rennes involvement in the diet by the intercepting of a Protestant pack of letters, Anjou voiced his approval of the choice on 17 February.

In the wake of Fulda, the Emperor announced to Charles that he would mediate with the rebels. The comte de Fiesque framed it sympathetically, highlighting that the Emperor had made an identical offer to Philip II over his troubles in the Netherlands. In both cases, there had been fear of the troubles spreading into Germany. The baron de Lux urged Catherine to seize on the opportunity of Imperial arbitration. In this letter of 24 February, he warned that Maximilian had issued a prohibition on any German mercenaries going to enter France irrespective of whether they were in the pay of the king of France or the rebels. This was not ideal for the royalists as their mercenaries had not all entered the kingdom.

On the subject of the Fulda proposal, the baron de Lux wrote to Charles on 15 March. The Imperial mediation would not produce a peace that was dishonourable to Charles' authority or dignity. Lux had been informed by the landgrave of Hesse that the only condition insisted upon by the Imperials would be that freedom of religion was guaranteed in a settlement, just as it had been in the Empire in 1555. It would be stressed to Condé and those of his party that they owed obedience to Charles, and with freedom of religion guaranteed to them they must disarm. As to the Protestant's other demands, concerning who Charles kept council with or distributed honours to, this was none of their business. The baron de Lux had enquired of them whether they would press the matter of French possession of the Three Bishoprics and been informed that while it could be an article, they would not push it too much. Indeed, if the Saxon Elector, as part of a peace seeking legation, brought the matter up, they would intervene against the proposal.

=== England ===
The English policy towards the French Protestant rebels was the subject of factional dispute inside England. The dominant faction, headed by William Cecil and the earl of Leicester supported an active interventionist policy in favour of both French and Dutch Protestants. However, England's capacity to proffer support was hampered by internal troubles in the kingdom. Debts and Catholic plots, which enjoyed Spanish and Papal support complicated foreign support.

Charles was keen to assure himself that the English crown would not support the rebel Protestants. His ambassador in England, the seigneur de La Forest, had written to assure him no support from Elizabeth to the rebels would be forthcoming. This was not sufficient for Charles though, and he tapped his ambassador in the Spanish Netherlands, the seigneur de Durescu to get the duke of Alba to write to Elizabeth requesting her maintain her neutrality. Alba was to emphasise that Philip would not approve of supporting rebels against their lord.

The aid promised to the rebel Protestants by England did not materialise. The lack of financial subsidies from England left the Protestant army in dire fiscal straits by early 1568.

=== Switzerland ===
The Swiss were particularly sensitive to the charge that they might be supporting rebels, and thus support from this quarter very quickly evaporated for the Protestants after the first civil war.

The city of Geneva was caught off guard by the resumption of the civil wars, only learning of the conflict a week into its unfolding. In early October news arrived of the Protestant seizure of Lyon, and prayers and repentance were ordered in the city. On 3 October, a public fast was ordered. While Condé's failure to consult with the pastors was to be expected given the frosty relationship between them post-1563, Coligny's silence was more curious. Coligny had been moving closer to the pastors, and in particular the spiritual leader of Calvinism after the death of John Calvin himself, Theodore de Beza.

Kingdon points to a letter of Beza's from either 1566 or 1567 in response to a missive of Coligny's (since lost) in search of advice, as possibly an oblique way of testing the waters for rebellion. In this letter Beza delineated the two spheres, the political and the ecclesiastical. In such instances as the church collected taxes, this was to temporarily assume the form of the political authority. However, Beza felt there were areas where the divide was more complicated, those involved in the administration of one necessarily dipped into the other. Thus, the ecclesiastical right to govern matters of conscience. From this analysis, he concluded pastors had a responsibility to ensure good conscience was maintained both in public and private, secondly that the government had a responsibility to protect the church.

Through the first, the church had a role to play in justice alongside the state, applying spiritual penalties. This was not the purview of one man, but a constituted body of elders, i.e. a consistory. In addition to criminal matters, high policy also fell under the purview of pastors. This did not mean pastors had to sit in on the council of princes, but rather that political decisions should not be taken without seeking the advice of pastors as and when it was required. Given in France many magistrates were still Catholic, he noted French Protestants established political assemblies to deal with the secular concerns of their Protestant communities. He opposed these institutions as risking usurping the secular government but granted that they could serve as extraordinary and temporary measures. As with the councils of princes, pastors might be invited in to act as consultants. He urged the Protestant aristocratic leadership not to 'conclude or undertake' anything without getting the input of experienced pastors. It was relevant to the kind of councils the Protestants held just before the conspiracy of Meaux, and Kingdon wonders whether this was on Beza or Coligny's mind in this exchange, though he notes Beza keeps it vague and general.

These extensive rights granted to the Protestant clergy were balanced in his second conclusion. Here civil authorities were shown to have certain responsibilities in the religious sphere. The magistrate had a role to play in dealing with heresy. The identification of the specific people was the purview of the church structures though.

Well aware of the vast costs of mercenaries, the Protestant leadership began looking for financial support in November 1567. The senate of Strasbourg and council of Bern were reached out to in the hopes of securing 225,000 livres from each of them. Geneva, which had a reputation for being far poorer, was also approached for 112,500 livres. Geneva and Bern both responded negatively to the financial outreach efforts. Strasbourg was able to put up only 13,000 florins.

=== Netherlands ===
As related to Dutch contacts, Condé and Coligny gained a go-between in the form of a certain Bernard de Malberg, a Luxembourgish noble who had participated in the Dutch revolt. In November, the Protestant leadership entrusted Malberg with meeting William, the prince of Orange. William responded favourably enough for Orange to be added to those Chastelier-Portault was to meet with in December during his mission into the Holy Roman Empire. Orange now expressed his concerns to Chastelier-Portault, in relation to how the Protestants were mixing their religious grievances with political ones. Orange thus wrote to the Elector of Saxony and the Palatinate to reassure them as to the purely religious nature of the Calvinist revolt in France and the Netherlands.

== Diplomatic efforts ==
=== Post-Saint-Denis negotiations ===
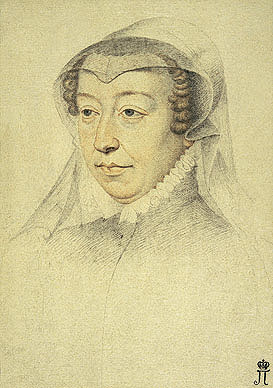
Catherine de' Medici, mother of king Charles IX, and leading force in the French state during the reign of her son

No sooner had the battle of Saint-Denis transpired, than the seigneur de Téligny, and then a certain Gastines, were dispatched to Paris to begin negotiations with the crown on 13 November. Word that peace was on the cards was already present in Spain, with Fourquevaux reporting on such talk to Charles in his letter of the same day. Téligny was to impart that the Protestants would only lay down their arms if persecution of Protestantism ceased, and the edict of pacification was fully observed. The devotion to royal service and loyalty of the Protestants to the king was stressed, something that had only been jeopardised by their persecution. Charles refused to negotiate on these terms, noting that if they wished to demonstrate their loyalty, they would disarm. The Protestant proposals were forwarded by Charles IX to Anjou's camp for discussion. Anjou received them while he was in Nemours. Both Anjou and his council were of the opinion that, given the present circumstances of the kingdom, the Protestant demands should be acceded to. The lieutenant-general gave his reply to the court on 29 November. In this opinion he argued that they should consent to the requests for those who enjoyed the rights of high justice in their land to enjoy Protestant worship among their households and those who gather with them. Catherine was keen to restore the primacy of civic authority over military, and thus was interested in peace. Catherine's first proposal was to offer freedom of religion for those who enjoyed the rights of high justice for their families and fifty others. With the crown's openness to offers thus demonstrated, Condé expanded his demands, requesting the rights for Protestant worship to take place in Paris and Lyon. L'Hôpital championed the peace party at court. He argued that even were the king to be victorious, as they all hoped, it would be to his detriment. A battle with the rebels would annihilate the nobility, and it was through the nobility that the kingdom found its strength and security. With these elements thus weakened, other powers that were for the moment peaceably inclined would seek to prey on Charles and his realm. L'Hôpital was countered by others that argued the only way to stop such rebellious inclinations as the Chancellor raised the spectre of, was to crush the current rebellion. Further, the King was in a good position to do so at the moment, due to the breadth of nobility in his service.

Condé entrusted the cardinal de Châtillon with furthering the negotiations to attain some clarity on points. It was agreed there would be a truce while Téligny made his way to the court, but the duc d'Anjou violated this truce. Negotiations continued with Téligny serving as the messenger between the court and the rebel camp.

The Protestant nobles (like their Catholic counterparts) were eager to fight and had to be soothed by Condé and Coligny from their passions.

During November, Catherine assured Álava that the crown would not make peace with the Protestants before appraising Philip. Delighted, Philip urged Álava to remind Catherine of this statement of hers whenever possible. Álava dutifully complied with this instruction. Writing to Philip on 29 November, Álava described the peace of Amboise, that had brought the first French War of Religion to a close, as a 'hellish peace'. The tour of the kingdom, undertaken from 1564 to 1566, had also been a mistake in Álava's estimation. He felt that it had empowered the Protestants.

While Catherine's prime ambition was peace, her son, the King, held a more rigid position. He would only offer a pardon to the Protestant rebels if their demands did not exceed those enunciated in the 1563 edict of Amboise. On the matter of Protestant worship in Lyon he rejected the proposition. He explained to his brother Anjou in a letter of 4 December that not only was Lyon a border city, but the people of the place would also reject Protestant worship there. Charles was also averse to the Protestants having a place in the judiciary or financial administration.

In a letter to the baron de Fourquevaux, written on 6 December, Charles explained his munificence. Even though the Protestant rebels had gone as far as to attack his own person, he preferred to receive them with kindness, if only they were prepared to be good subjects of the crown once more.

=== December talks ===
Negotiations were conducted between 8 and 10 December, thanks to the truce orchestrated by Condé's mother-in-law, the marquise de Rothelin. According to the English report of 4 January, the Protestant demands included the re-establishment of the edict of Amboise without any of its subsequent modifications, the appointment of bailliages for the practice of Protestantism, the maintenance of the Protestants in their estates and offices, the inclusion of Lyon in the same rights as Protestantism enjoyed elsewhere, permission to hold synods, and that the edict of Amboise be permanent.

Charles' response dismissed the possibility of negotiating with the prince de Condé, or any of his other subjects, as an equal. If the Protestants laid down their arms within three days, and surrendered all places under their control, as King, he would stay at arms, governing his kingdom as he pleased. Charles offered to restore the edict of Amboise in its original form, sans any of the modifications made to it between 1563 and 1567. Gentleman would not be prosecuted for the practicing of Protestantism in their homes, assuming that no more than fifty persons beyond their family attended. Lyon, on account of its status as a border town and place of foreigners, would not be granted Protestantism. The raising of funds and holding of synods would be prohibited for the Protestants. If the Protestants complied with these demands, the King would dispatch letters patent assuring them of their liberty of conscience, goods, and lives.

Condé proposed some modifications to this proposal. He wanted those who enjoyed high justice, and therefore the right to practice the Protestant faith in their domiciles to have the limit on the number they could invite into this worship lifted. He wished to see a site of worship granted in Paris. Further, that gentlemen in the bailliage and prévôté (bailliage and provostship) of Paris enjoy the same privileges regarding the practice of Protestantism as gentlemen elsewhere. Finally, that synods be permitted, as they were as necessary to Protestant life as schools, burials, or any other aspect of the faith.

The seigneur d'Alluye, one of the secretaries of state who had a key role to play in these negotiations, complained to the duc de Nevers in letter of 16 December that he scarcely had time to eat or drink for how busy he was.

With too many points of divergence, this round of negotiation failed.

=== Vincennes talks ===
Over the objections of the Spanish ambassador and the hawkishly pro-war Parisians, Catherine continued to push for negotiations.

During January, Catherine met with the cardinal de Châtillon at Châlons, where the royal army was headquartered. The two negotiated at length. Catherine and Châtillon then proceeded back towards Paris. Condé's position was stronger by this point, having united with his German mercenaries, and thus he sought more at the negotiating table. Among the Protestant demands, he wanted Boulogne and Calais to be handed over to the Protestants as surety towns, in assurance of the crowns good faith. This was rejected as an impingement of the crown's honour.

Châtillon took up residence at the château de Vincennes alongside Téligny and the comte de La Rochefoucauld on 15 January. Catherine brought them over to discuss peace at the Louvre during the night. It was thought best to keep them lodged away from the capital, where their presence could arouse popular anger. Charles refused to grant them an audience. Álava was incensed by their presence, arguing that if they had been brought there as prisoners that would be one thing, but to discuss peace with them was an affront to God. Nevertheless, the parties talked for three hours. After three days at Vincennes without further talks, on 17 January, Châtillon was met by the seigneur de Lanssac and the bishop of Orléans who stated they were there to continue negotiations. This was to the Cardinal's surprise, as he had hoped to negotiate directly with the King. This discussion did not further the negotiations.

Nevertheless, the bishop of Orléans and seigneur de Lanssac came to Catherine on the evening of 17 January that the cardinal de Châtillon and prince de Condé were well-disposed. Therefore, the cause of peace must be championed, while they worked through the final sticking points. To the anger of Châtillon, on 18 January, Lanssac and the bishop of Orléans were replaced by the first and second présidents of the Paris parlement (de Thou and Baillet). He found the turnover in negotiators vexing. Two days more negotiations continued with no progress.

Catherine requested the presence of the Spanish ambassador Álava, so that he might delay the despatch he was writing to Philip. By this means she could be true to her word to bring Philip's attention to the peace before it transpired.

According to the Spanish ambassador, the following exchange transpired when Catherine had returned to court on 18 January. Catherine inquired of Álava his opinion of her foray to the frontlines. Álava, with typical bluntness, decried her visit, and noted he had warned Philip that he may receive news that peace had been agreed upon from someone other than he. Catherine chafed at this criticism, noting she had left the army in the capable hands of Aumale, Tavannes and Sanssac. Álava maintained his dismissiveness, arguing they could do little while the queen brought around with her such wicked advisors. Informing Catherine he needed to read to her a passage from a letter sent by the Spanish sovereign, the others in the room were made to leave. After they had left, Álava laid into Carnavalet and the maréchal de Cossé, accusing them of bringing ruin on the royalist cause. Catherine explained she had discussed matters with Carnavalet and left him in the camp when satisfied of this. To this, the Spanish ambassador responded by asking Catherine if she did not know the man was a Protestant. Álava moved on to the letter from Philip, reading it to Catherine, who listened carefully. She stated that the letter showed Philip as a good prince and noted she was doing all she could in this conflict. Hearing this, Álava rounded into a denunciation of the arrival at the capital of the cardinal de Châtillon and several other Protestants. Álava reminded her that she had promised the Spanish sovereign she would not make peace with the rebels before informing him. Catherine did not deny her promise but spoke of the quality of this peace offer. Álava inquired which Catholics had approved the terms. The Queen Mother highlighted the premier président of the parlement and the archbishop of Sens. Álava then asked her to write the statement concerning not making peace without informing Philip first in her own hand. Catherine demurred, raising the spectre that the letter could be intercepted. For her, it was sufficient that Álava write her words to Philip. Checking there were no eavesdroppers, Catherine then listed for Álava the small handful of people of significance committed against peace, assuring him there were no others: herself, the King, the cardinals de Bourbon and de Lorraine, the seigneur de Tavannes, the duc d'Aumale and the seigneur de Sanssac. She stated the kingdom's finances were poor, and assistance was required to meet their obligations at months end. Álava pressed on this point, wanting to know where the Papal revenues, as well as the money from the clergy and the city of Paris had gone. Catherine offered a breakdown: the clergy's lands had been subject to the depredation of the soldiers, making their use impossible for the merchants, ordinary incomes had long since dried up, and the Pope had offered only a pittance. Álava still kept on, speaking of the confiscations from the rebels. Catherine noted that this was indeed a sizable sum, but it would take time to realise, time they did not have when dealing with mercenaries. The Queen Mother bemoaned her isolation, detailing the abuse of her position she had been subject to at the royal camp for being against making peace. On the matter of the negotiations at the château de Vincennes, she argued that the seigneur de Lanssac, and bishop of Orléans were the firmest enemies of the Protestants. They had been sent to negotiate with the Protestants to kill the prospect of peace, not bring it about. This was not satisfactory for Álava, who felt even such talks were indecent for a monarch to undertake. Irrespective of whether they were doomed to fail, Charles' reputation was sullied by their existence. He recalled Montmorency stating that the only proper use of negotiations was to lull the enemy into a false sense of security, so that they might be crushed. Catherine again opined that the general pressure from all quarters was towards peace. Álava's opinion remained that Catherine and Charles were avoidant on the matter of fighting their enemies. That Catholics, Protestants, and atheists all sought settlement to avoid a bloody battle. Catherine also defended her wider pool of advisors during this conversation, comparing them to those of Philip II. Indeed, she asserted, it was the wish of the ministers of Philip that the French tear themselves to pieces through civil war. Álava exploded in outrage at this accusation, voiced in earshot of others. Álava prepared to make his withdrawal, while Catherine pled for him to hold onto his despatch another day so that the final decision on the peace could be included in the communique. Álava refused and warned her again of the promise she had made.

Knowing she had to compete with the narrative the Spanish ambassador would present to Philip, Catherine, outraged at Álava's behaviour during the interview of 18 January, wrote to her ambassador in Spain Fourquevaux, to ensure he had her perspective on the discussion. She narrated how Álava had contradicted her statement of her opinions, and expressed his desire to see them all die at Saint-Denis (which he did not consider a battle). She had informed Álava her presence was the only thing maintaining the friendship between France and Spain. She had also told Álava she was certain Philip was more well-disposed to them than his ministers were. Her enthusiasm for decisive battle was also included in the letter to Fourquevaux, for in her telling that was the reason she had come to the Protestant camp earlier in the month, to bolster their determination. Fourquevaux was instructed to not mention Álava's 'outrageous' behaviour directly to Philip, but rather confide it in Élisabeth. Having received Catherine's despatch on 5 February, he would indeed not include it in his audience with Philip of 7 February. Élisabeth got back to him on the matter on 18 February. She described her husband's outrage at Álava's presumptuousness to speak in such a way to Catherine. The king had thus written to his ambassador to chastise him. Fourquevaux dutifully reported on all that he had learned from Élisabeth to Catherine.

The Pope, who had learned that the (excommunicated) cardinal de Châtillon had come to the capital, demanded that he be handed over to the Papacy for punishment. According to the English ambassador, Álava (alongside the Papal Nuncio) demanded that Catherine arrest the cardinal de Châtillon. Catherine refused to arrest someone who had come to the court under a promise of safe conduct. To this the Papal Nuncio remarked that such promises did not need to be kept with heretics.

Fearful of royalist negotiations with the Protestants, on 20 January Philip II dispatched a courier to offer Catherine one million gold pieces if she would spurn such negotiations.

Finally, Catherine summoned the cardinal de Châtillon to the convent of Minimes.

Châtillon demanded that any pacification edict be permanent, as opposed to provisional. That the Protestant mercenaries be paid off by the crown, and that it be acknowledged in the registers of the parlement that the Protestant uprising had not been a rebellion but rather a necessary act. He relented on the matter of surety towns and stressed the desire of the Protestants to live and die in the king's service. Catherine inquired what guarantee they would have that the Protestants would not engineer another coup like that at Meaux. Châtillon explained that he could discuss it with the Queen, but she did not take this as a serious proposal. While Catherine might have been inclined to accept this, her son was not. In contrast to this, the starting point for the king was that the Protestants unilaterally disarm. He further demanded that the Protestant leaders come to him to explain the act they had undertaken against him at Meaux. With the Protestant position unacceptable to the crown, that evening the seigneur de Lanssac and bishop of Orléans went to the château de Vincennes to inform the cardinal. They explained the king could not consent to the edict being irrevocable, or to pay off the Protestant mercenaries. Further, Protestants would not enjoy public office, their ministers must be expelled, and a pardon requested from the king. The cardinal de Châtillon asked to take his leave, feeling further talks were pointless in the current impasse, and this was granted.

=== Justification ===
In letter to the baron de Fourquevaux of 22 January 1568, Charles informed his ambassador that he was sending a memorandum concerning the peace negotiations with the Protestants. This was with the intention of seeing Fourquevaux keep Philip and Élisabeth in the loop. In addition to this were around seven other documents that chronicled the back and forth of negotiations between the crown and the Protestants going all the way back to early October. Fourquevaux reported that he had given them to Élisabeth to read. The ambassador understood she would then pass the information on to her husband.

Charles hoped to clear up the confusion of the Spanish as to the reason talks had been undertaken previously. He explained that he had entertained these negotiations in part for the benefit of the Protestant German princes, who would be alienated by seeing the crown unwilling to explore any basis of negotiation. Further he described it as a stalling tactic so that the royalist mercenaries might arrive in the kingdom. It would also allow him to assure himself of the security of his cities and provinces. It was necessary that this stratagem remain a secret.

A rumour of imminent peace was to be found in Spain in early February. Having an audience with the Spanish king on 7 February, Fourquevaux immediately assured him that it was not possible for the crown to be further away from peace than it was presently. This was fruitless, the Spanish being convinced from this time that peace was on the cards between the royalists and the Protestant rebels.

To those that inquired of him in the following weeks about the prospect of peace in France, Fourquevaux informed them a second battle was more likely, if indeed, it had not already transpired without his being presently aware.

The Spanish ambassador, in a despatch of 19 February, reported on a meeting he had enjoyed with Catherine and the King. The French court had become aware of the imprisonment of Philip's son don Carlos, and this steeled Catherine to resist Álava. Before the king, his mother, and the conseil privé the Spanish ambassador read the official account of the affair. Catherine followed this with a grandiose speech, in which she reviewed the various sins of the places of Christendom which must have inspired God’s wrath. This continental tour began with Scotland, but when it arrived at Spain, she affixed Álava with a stare, noting that he could well see the causes for discontent in his master's kingdom. Instead of replying to Catherine, Álava turned to the King, and noted that Catherine was wise to observe God’s wrath, but surely it must most severely be witnessed in its impacts against France. He hoped Charles would restore France to how it had been under prior sovereigns. He dismissed Catherine's characterisation of a beleaguered Spain, noting that Philip's subjects had much cause to offer thanks to God. They lived in peace, under a prudent Catholic prince. Catherine did not disagree to this characterisation but inquired as to the condition of the various states that Philip ruled. Álava did not take the bait, noting that they were in good standing, and Philip had made progress in all places since coming to the throne. Catherine returned that Philip had taken the throne as an adult, something the ambassador noted he was thankful for. The Queen Mother took umbrage at this, seeing a subtle attack on her. Álava dismissed this, stating he was not intending to relitigate the past, but then stated to Charles that when he reached a suitable age, he would see how those who had advised him had led him of the true path, that would have seen him crush the enemy he faced at the first opportunity. Catherine bade Charles reply to this attack. The King defended his mother, stating that she had exhorted the commanders and conseil privé to follow this course, but there had been a countervailing opinion in these groups. Álava notes that Catherine restrained her son, who was becoming quite animated, by tugging on his cloak. In an aside to Philip, Álava wrote that Charles, though of the stature of Anjou, remained childlike. Álava again produced the letter in which Catherine had promised not to make peace without first informing Philip, and Catherine assured him she would be true to her word, Charles assuring similarly.

Picking up on the theme she had in her conversation with Álava in days previous, Catherine wrote to Fourquevaux on 23 February that God’s wrath was clearly shown in the don Carlos affair as in the descent of France to civil war. Gellard notes that wisely, Fourquevaux did not use this particular line concerning Philip's son with him.

Sournia believed Condé to be in a position of great strength at this time, with Chartres soon to fall to him, and after that Paris at his mercy. He thus attributes his drive towards peace as a sign of his poor negotiation abilities. As late as 1 March, Charles still wrote to Fourquevaux on the line that battle was a realistic prospect. Fourquevaux continued to work towards impressing this notion in Spain. Gellard sees this as partly a product of his instructions, partly his own inclinations. Fourquevaux was partly kept in the dark as to the negotiations undertaken. This was so that he might act in a way most agreeable to the French crown in the approach he undertook in Spain.

=== Longjumeau negotiations ===
From his new base at Orléans, Condé made a plea to Charles and Catherine on 22 February to bring the disastrous war to an end. Daussy places his outreach for negotiations on 24 February, noting that while Catherine was open to the prospect, Charles was reticent.

On 25 February, negotiations resumed at Longjumeau between the cardinal de Châtillon, seigneur de La Rochefoucauld, seigneur de Bouchavannes and a certain abbot de Lagny for the Protestants; and the maréchal de Montmorency, bishop of Orléans, bishop of Limoges, and the secretary of state Alluye for the royalists. Discussions focused on points of detail, as peace at large was considered to be a done deal. Specifically, guarantees the edict would be implemented, the relocation of inconvenient sites of Protestant worship and the creation of chambers in each parlement of the least partisan members of the body which would have exclusive cognisance of matters of the edict of pacification and religion for such a length of time as Charles designated. Condé was prepared to compromise. Coligny was less inclined to, desiring security to prevent Catherine revenging herself on them for the surprise of Meaux.

Charles fumed at the idea he pay off the mercenaries that had fought against him. Nevertheless, on 4 March, Charles consented to the re-establishment of the edict of Amboise as well as the royal payment of the Protestant mercenaries.

The Protestant articles of 4 March, presented by the cardinal de Châtillon, comte de La Rochefoucauld, and Bouchavannes, looked to amend some of the areas they had identified as problems with the edict of Amboise. They desired that the towns in each bailliage and sénéchaussée that were granted for Protestant worship be personally selected by the King rather than left to local discretion. They wanted the senior officers of the crown to swear to the observation of the edict, and for all provincial parlements to ratify the articles and agreements made. Further, that the edict once published not be subsequently diluted by interpretative declarations. In such cases as the Protestants suffered injustice, they wished to have direct recourse to the King. The negotiators sought the right for ministerial assemblies (i.e. synods) and Protestant education for children. Conscious of the temperament of the parlements, a request for chambers exclusively composed of dispassionate and peaceable judges should be established to hear cases concerning Protestants. Charles fumed to his negotiators on 4 March that Condé had put Chartres to siege while the royal army was under a truce. In his letter to the bishop of Limoges he requested his representative impart the king's displeasure to the cardinal de Châtillon and those around him, so that they might put a halt to the siege of Chartres.

In addition to the demands, the negotiations of 4 March also included marital proposals. For the young duc de Guise to marry the prince de Condé's eldest daughter, and for the seigneur d'Andelot to marry the duc de Guise's sister.

Alluye would return to court sometime before 6 March, greatly despondent due to the exorbitant demands the Protestant negotiators were offering.

The Protestants had moderated their requests by 6 March, to simply the application of the edict of Amboise, and the payment of their mercenaries by the crown.

Three days later, on 10 March, the seigneur d'Alluye again returned to court bearing the Protestant demands, which included the insistence that Charles payoff the mercenaries the Protestants had hired.

On 11 March, a truce was established between the rebel Protestants and the crown.

== Pursuit of the Protestants ==
=== Nevers' campaign ===
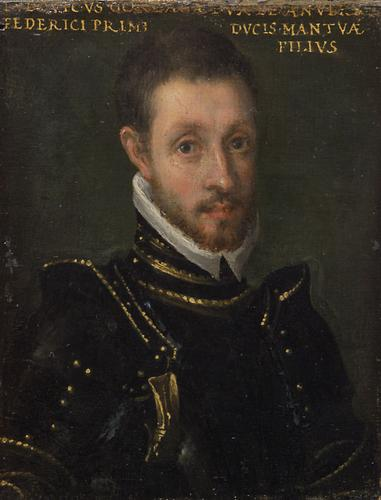
Duc de Nevers, who would lead an independent army in support of the royalist war effort

On 15 October, the king wrote to the duc de Nevers. He was to unify the forces he was bringing to the capital (the five old band infantry companies that were stationed in the French Piedmontese fortresses) with the new 4,000 Swiss mercenaries the crown was raising. These five old companies were a mixture of arquebusiers (who accounted for around 63% of the force) and mostly armoured pikemen (29% of the force). To hold the Piedmont forts in their absence, legionnaires (local infantry) could be raised from Piedmont or other companies moved in to the sensitive border region. Nevers was advised that a representative of his had already arrived at the French court bringing word of the energies Nevers was devoting to the raising of further foot soldiers. He was assured that the army was well served for infantry, and that the bringing north of the old bands would suffice.

The next day, the duc de Nevers was instructed to recapture for the crown places in Dauphiné that had fallen to the Protestants on his route north. Three days further, on 19 October, Nevers was urged to see to the restoration of royal control over Vienne in Dauphiné and Mâcon in Burgundy, both of which had entered Protestant hands. To assist him in this, he could look to the force under Birague in Lyon. Given the paucity of royal funds, it was hoped that Nevers would be able to accomplish this with only 1,200 livres brought by a certain Molé, with the rest of his financing conducted on credit.

The duc de Nevers had still not arrived in Paris by 7 November. The King, impatient for his arrival, ordered that he, and his soldiers, not devote themselves any further to anything other than making their way to the capital with all haste. It was stressed that it would be in Paris that the climactic showdown transpired, and therefore this was where it was important for all royal commanders to be. The King noted that the Swiss Nevers was bringing were presently without a commander of their own, Charles advised Nevers to pick a worthy Frenchman for the position while they were on route to the capital. Charles suggested the seigneur de Nançay for the role.

On 18 November, the duc de Nevers mustered his army at Belleville. In total, it contained around 8,000 soldiers, of which 4,000 were the Swiss, and for the others there were the five veteran French infantry companies, and twenty-one companies raised from among the Italians. Wood summarises the army as functionally resembling a miniature version of the main royal army under the duc d'Anjou. The French companies were around two-thirds arquebus based, while the Italian's were nine-tenths. At the muster, the old bands swore an oath to serve the King as ordered by the duc de Nevers, and the comte de Brissac (the colonel-general of the transalpine French infantry). The Italians swore a similar oath, but in their own language, and with their own colonel's substituted for Brissac's name.

The duc de Nevers oversaw the recapture of Vienne for the royal cause at some point during November. This received congratulations from the king in a letter of 23 November. The monarch advised that he also see to reconquest of Autun and Mâcon. He hoped that the capture of these places would not delay Nevers too long though, as he looked to see him link up his force with the main royal army under the duc d'Anjou. He also expressed his desire that it would be possible for Nevers to take these places en route.

On 4 December, the duc de Nevers' men captured Mâcon. Nevers had used the French infantry as opposed to the Italian to storm the city. Wood speculates perhaps because of the obsolete weapons the Italian infantry used. He also notes that the Italians were poorly armoured, increasing the risks of employing them for assaulting a breach. The seigneur d'Alluye had written to Nevers while the siege was ongoing, urging him to hurry quickly and join with the army of the duc d'Anjou.

With the military situation rapidly evolving, Charles struggled to coordinate his generals. Writing to Nevers on 8 December, the king's mood of optimism had faded. He had been informed the German mercenaries in the Protestant's employ were making straight for Champagne. Nevers was thus ordered to make against them as quickly as possible, rather than heading for Montargis.

Despite the best efforts of the duc d'Aumale, cardinal de Lorraine and seigneur de Tavannes, they struggled to impede the progress of the German Protestant mercenaries as they made their way west to rendezvous with Condé and Coligny. The duc de Guise also hoped to stop the progress of the mercenaries, and had stationed himself in Champagne to this end.

Before his departure from Nemours, on 12 December, Anjou wrote to the duc de Nevers. He informed the duc that he was heading off the next day in pursuit of the Protestants. Nevers was to unify his army with that of the seigneur de Tavannes and duc d'Aumale and then join with Anjou's army. As a united force, they could block the passage of the reiters, and their junction with the rebel Protestant army.

The orders to Nevers on 14 December focused on the need for him to go and support the forces of the duc d'Aumale and duc de Guise near Toul in Lorraine, where they would block the entry of the German reiters from entering the kingdom. Nevers protested of the confusion in the orders he was being given, to which the king responded on 16 December by noting that in war, the situation could change hour to hour, and orders must change with the changing circumstances. Charles reiterated that by linking up with d'Aumale, Nevers would be doing him the utmost service.

The king again wrote to Nevers on 17 December. He expressed his need for his various generals in the field (including his brother) to communicate well with one another so that they would not be caught facing the enemy alone. He avoided giving specific directions, knowing that Nevers' actions would be contingent on the word he got from Anjou and Aumale.

The next day, the duc d'Anjou wrote to Nevers from his base in Sézanne ordering him to link up with the royal army which was making next for Châlons.

=== Protestant flight east ===
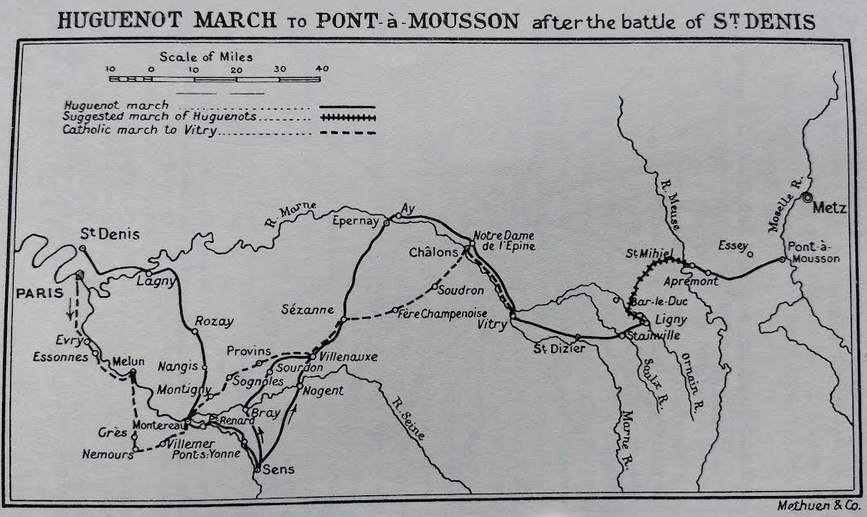
Retreat of the Protestant army after the battle of Saint-Denis to link up with their German mercenaries.

Having abandoned the field of Saint-Denis, the Protestant forces were reviewed between Lagny and Rosoi. Breaking camp from Brie-Comte-Robert, which they had captured, the Protestant army moved south to Montereau where they took refuge. Here they could count on Orléans to protect the army's rear. They anticipated the arrival of Protestant forces from Guyenne and Poitou under the command of the comte de La Rochefoucauld, as well as the German mercenaries they had taken the employ of. Having crossed the Seine at Montereau, they departed this place on the night of 13-14 November, destroying a village as they left as a sign of their strength. The Yonne was in turn forded at Port Renard. Courlon was taken and put to the sack. Arriving at Sens, the army split into two and began moving northwards again. The duc de Guise, keen to engage the admiral de Coligny in combat and deny the Protestants their merger with the German mercenaries, had sealed himself in Sens, hoping to hold out in the city much as his father had in siege of Metz. The admiral de Coligny however took advantage of Guise being out of the way to circumvent Sens. Condé and Coligny crossed the Seine at Bray-sur-Seine, which was sacked on 28 November. A column under the seigneur d'Andelot swung eastwards and appeared before Nogent. The population of Nogent was commanded to surrender, and after a bluff of resistance, the populace fled towards Provins in the first days of December. Nogent was sacked. The bridges over the Seine at both Nogent and Bray were destroyed in the wake of the Protestant passage. Having occupied Pont-sur-Yonne at the start of December, the Protestant army linked up with the forces brought from the west of the kingdom (Guyenne and Poitou) brought north by the comte de La Rochefoucauld.

On 10 December, Condé crossed the Seine, setting up camp at Villecendrier near Provins. Provins would be spared Protestant attentions. Claude Haton reports that the Protestant army had intended to secure the place of Provins, subjecting it to a siege and sack. They were however, dissuaded from doing so by a Protestant seigneur de Saint-Simon, who was from the area. Saint-Simon is to have made the case that Provins had assiduously maintained its neutrality throughout the civil wars. Therefore it should be left unmolested. Saint-Simon's argument is to have won the day, with the Protestants bypassing the city. Condé thus bypassed Provins, moving to Villenauxe-la-Grande which was sacked, and it was here that the two parts of the Protestant army reunited. Two days later he was to be found in Sézanne. Another local notable, the baron de Plancy, was unable to stop Condé's force from sacking Sézanne. Plancy had been historically close to Condé, with a land grant of August describing him as being in the prince's suite. Representatives had been sent into Sézanne, to ransom the place to avoid a sack. Despite these negotiations, the Protestant army entered Sézanne, sacking and burning the place. In the city, new ransoms were demanded of the wealthy citizenry. Vexed at this betrayal of Sézanne by Condé, the baron de Plancy left the Protestant army, retiring to his nearby estates. It was at Épernay that the Marne was forded.

Crossing the Marne, the Protestants moved through the town of Aÿ. They then pivoted, following the course of the Marne eastwards, to first Notre-Dame de l'Épine, where they had a close encounter with the royal army, Condé making his escape through Possesse, and then southwards onto Vitry. They departed the course of the Marne here, hopping to Saint-Dizier and then fording first the river Saulx and then the river Ornain at Stainville and Ligny respectively, entering Lorraine.

The Protestant army made its passage across the Meuse at Saint-Mihiel, and then the Moselle arriving at Pont-à-Mousson on 6 January 1568. The German mercenaries, under the command of John Casimir, among whom was 6,500 reiters and 3,000 landsknechts, could not be impeded in their march across Lorraine, and on 11 January they effected juncture with the Protestant army near Pont-à-Mousson. Fortunately for the Protestants, the Elector Palatine had put up the cost of 100,000 florins for the initial hiring of his son's mercenaries. However, before his captains would agree to fight for the rebel Protestants, they wanted to receive their first months' pay up front. They demanded to receive 100,000 écus from Condé and Coligny. Condé had to his name only 2,000 écus, and thus everyone was encouraged to contribute, he and Coligny setting an example for the leadership by the allocation of their plate to the payment. The Protestant commanders, and pastors, set to work trying to scrounge together this sum from their men. The wealthier members donated their gold plate, chains and other valuables. In total they succeeded in putting together 80,000 livres, around a quarter of the sum the mercenary captains had sought. This satisfied the mercenary commanders. The duc d'Anjou reported on this development to the French court in two letters of 10 January, one to Charles the other to Catherine. He noted that the Protestant leadership had raised a loan among their own soldiers to pay the mercenaries. That d'Andelot and Coligny had feasted the captains of the reiters at Seuzey. With them they brought a vast quantity of bread (20,000 loaves), and twenty muids of wine. In the capitulation of 27/28 January, the specifics of the mercenaries in the Protestant employ would be broken down. It included twenty-one cornets of reiters, as well as a regiment of landsknechts. With the addition of volunteer cavalry, this totalled a sum of 8,000 cavalry and 3,000 infantry. Their signing bonus and laufgeld were then discussed. Pay was required for a month after their dismissal at the regular rate to allow for their return to Germany. Pay was rounded up always, for example, if they served even one day in the fourth month of employ before being relieved of services, they would be owed the entire fourth month pay. Each reiter would receive 22.5 livres a month. The total cost of John Casimir's army for a month's service was a little under 100,000 écus.

=== Royalist hunt ===
==== Departure from Paris ====
On 14 November, Charles wrote to his Spanish ambassador Fourquevaux about his expectations for how the Protestants would proceed. He believed they would make into Champagne to link up with the German mercenaries they had recruited. He was optimistic though, on the basis of information from his diplomatic agent in the Holy Roman Empire, the bishop of Rennes, that it would take several months before this mercenary force was ready to join with the Protestant rebels.

The duc d'Aumale was entrusted with heading into Lorraine by the crown. This was to the end of a dual purpose. Firstly, he would unite with the 3,000 German soldiers under the duke of Saxony and the marquis of Baden-Baden, and secondly, he would block the entry of the Protestant's German mercenaries into the kingdom.

On 24 November, the duc d'Anjou departed from Paris, with an army numbering approximately 40,000 men. He inaugurated his new office of lieutenant-general in a review of the Flemish cavalry sent to the kingdom by the duke of Alba. This force was composed of 1,200 lances. King Charles, who was with the army at this time, rode past the squadrons of cavalry himself. Both he and his mother Catherine then hugged Anjou, before returning to the capital.

On 6 December, Anjou had discussed the order the army was to follow on march. It was agreed that the duc de Montpensier would lead the vanguard and Anjou himself the battle (main body of the army). The vanguard would proceed ahead a couple of miles before the battle. Leading Montpensier's vanguard were the light horse, armed with pistols and swords. Following behind them, several detachments of the gendarmerie marched in parallel, the smallest under the duc de Longueville (810), then the duc de Nemours (990) and the weight (1440) under the command of Montpensier. Behind these gendarmes, a large part of the French infantry, numbering some 9,000, under the command of the comte de Brissac. Pikemen formed the core of this infantry. At their rear, the pioneers, conscripted labourers and baggage train.

For the battle, gendarmes under Haremberg (1,600) and Martigues (840) led the way, with the ladder bringing up 2,100 infantry. Behind them, the artillery train numbering some 2,700 persons. A large parallel cohort followed, centred around the 6,000 Swiss soldiers (almost all pikemen) with a further 4,642 infantry under the command of the seigneur de Strozzi flanking this body on either side. Outside of this core, some more infantry under Martinengo, and four bodies of gendarmes (Anjou commanding 990, the maréchal de Cossé 900, the comte de Villars 990, and the seigneur de Thoré 450). To the rear of this mass, the baggage and train, with a rearguard of 190 horse (a mixture of gendarmes and light horse) at the very end of the battle, to encourage stragglers and to engage in scouting duties.

While the light cavalry was predominately in the vanguard, and the artillery in the battle, there was little otherwise to distinguish the two forces from being a smaller and a larger army in sum. The order of march also served as an order of battle, a 90 degrees turn, or a filing into line of the battle to a flank of the vanguard produced the line of tactical blocks. The army was at this time composed of around 38,000 effective soldiers, for a total of 50,000 persons when camp followers were factored in. It was the largest royal army put into the field during the civil wars. 204 officers were assigned for the leadership of the army. Of these, only around forty enjoyed responsibilities more senior than that of an infantry or cavalry company. Command was shallow, with only two steps between Anjou and a captain of gendarmes, and three steps between Anjou and an infantry captain.

==== Corbeil ====
The royal army advanced first to Corbeil. As they progressed, the duc d'Anjou was besieged by letters from his mother, advising him to discuss peace proposals that the King had received from the Protestants. Though Anjou was in favour of negotiations, the march eastwards continued. From his base at Corbeil, correspondence from the King dated 25 November assured him reinforcements were being raised to supplement his army.

Anjou was to be found in Melun on 27 November, concerned for the place of Montargis, which belonged to Renée, daughter of king Louis XII. The duc d'Anjou wrote to his cousin that day. He requested that 200,000 loaves of bread be made available for the army commissioners, as soldiers would be coming through the city. In an undated letter, written at some point in November, Anjou wrote to Renée that the Protestants had resolved to seize Montargis, which they could use to cause much grief, and therefore he implored he her to look favourably on royal troops arriving in the city.

On 28 November, new word came from king Charles to the duc d'Anjou. The king advised his brother to have the two companies of foot soldiers of the seigneur de Puygaillard, as well as the companies of de Cristo and du Bicq all placed under the authority of the count of Martinengo (who commanded the Papal forces afforded to the crown). This would expand Martinengo's authority to covering six companies in total.

By 29 November, Anjou had reached Fontainebleau. From here he wrote his Mother that the sieur de La Gastine had arrived in the army camp, and that he had overseen La Gastine's memorandum (which contained the Protestant demands for peace) being read before the various princes and captains of his army. He summarised the opinion of the assembled for Catherine as being that the terms, by which those seigneurs who enjoyed high justice in their lands might be able to practice the Protestant faith, should be accepted, due to the great ruin the kingdom was being drawn into by the civil war. This would be on the condition that Catholics were at liberty in these places, and that tithes continued to be paid to the Catholic church. He noted that, at La Gastine's prompting, the other terms the Protestants had raised had not been debated, due to the opinion that the Protestants would defer to Catherine's judgement on all other points. The duc de Nemours and duc de Longueville were happy to be the ones to go and sign the peace with the Protestants. They would follow the lead of Catherine in this matter.

==== Nemours ====
Anjou also alerted Catherine to the fact he intended to arrive in the city of Nemours with his army the following day. His army took the opportunity of its stay in Nemours to reorganise its artillery, and await the arrival of Gascon reinforcements. It would thus be from Nemours that he wrote to the duc de Nevers on 30 November. Still in Nemours on 2 December, he warned Renée that soldiers under the command of the baron de Terride would shortly be arriving in Montargis. He hoped she would greet them kindly and furnish them with the aforementioned foodstuff.

On 3 December, Anjou was instructed by the court to continue military operations. Having remained in Nemours, while Terride had gone forward, the duc d'Anjou wrote back on 3 December, that he had received the seigneur de Mauvissière who had appraised the assembled grandees on the articles of peace. He assured his mother and brother that his army would march on 4 December, something that would have begun sooner had provisions not been in such a poor way. The sieur de La Gastine, who would serve as the bearer of this letter, would appraise the crown on Anjou's feelings concerning the articles of peace. The following day, he was able to reassure Renée that the royal soldiers coming through Montargis would stay out of the city proper, restricting themselves to the suburbs. They would nevertheless expect resupply.

In a letter of 5 December to Anjou, Charles credited his brother with the relief of the Protestant siege of Sens, and taking measures to see to the security of Provins and Sézanne. Charles wrote to the duc de Nevers on the matter expressing his pleasure that 'the enemy' had withdrawn from before Sens, Layant and Fault, and had 'lost many men there'. He believed they were retreating towards back towards Montereau, and that the royal army, soon to be supplemented by Gascons would achieve a victory over them.

Around 6 December, Charles was optimistic concerning the military situation. He wrote to his ambassador in Spain, Fourquevaux, on that day, speculating that the German mercenaries the Protestants had hired would arrive too late to support them.

While Anjou's army was camped at Nemours, the mother-in-law of the prince de Condé, the marquise de Rothelin visited the royal camp. She brought with her the King's proposal for peace, the restoration of the terms of the edict of Amboise. She succeeded in extracting a three day truce from the commander, which Anjou confirmed with her by letter of 6 December from Nemours. During the course of the three day truce, troops would not cross the Yonne river. Catherine meanwhile dispatched the seigneur de Lanssac to the royal army, to gauge her son's intentions with the army.

Writing to her ambassador in Spain on 7 December, Catherine characterised the rebels harshly, calling them 'vermin'.

Anjou was forced to apologise to Renée on 8 December, that it was not possible for him to prevent the passage of the Gascon soldiers through her city of Montargis.

Joblin imagines that after the experience of having the royal soldiery move through her territory, Renée asked that the act not be repeated. They cite the pledge of Anjou on 9 February to send no more soldiers through the area as evidence. In a similar fashion, on 22 December, the king had to write to the dowager duchesse to request that she permit the lieutenant-general of Marseille, a certain captain Moulhon, to travel through Montargis with his company on his return to Marseille. In addition to affording him passage, she was to provide an escort.

On 13 December, Anjou broke camp from Nemours. He was advised by the king to make to link up with the duc d'Aumale without waiting for the arrival of reinforcements, as the highest priority was preventing the junction of the Protestant army and their German reiters.

==== Montereau ====
The royal army reached Montereau on 14 December, from where Anjou again wrote to the duc de Nevers, advising him that if he could not link with Anjou's army presently, to make instead for Châlons or Troyes. The next day the royal army made for Provins. Fresh off sacking Sézanne, the Protestant army arrived at nearby Epernay on 14 December and spent the next three days terrorising the city as they progressed the repairs of the bridge over the Marne. On 17 December they departed, having extorted a ransom of 10,500 livres from the place. Sézanne had also paid the Protestant army 14,000 livres to spare itself a sack.

On 18 December, Anjou wrote to the duc de Nevers from Sézanne ordering him to come link with the royal army at Châlons.

The king wrote to Anjou on 20 December, advising him on the money he had sent across for the payment of the royal soldiery. Charles cautioned against waste, noting that he should make sure the Gascons of Monluc and the bands of the seigneur de Sainctorens did not receive double payment.

On 19 December, the city of Châlons received orders for 200,000 loaves of bread to supply the royal army. This placed the city in a tricky position in conjunction with the garrison that had been imposed on it. Thus, it was determined to confiscate Protestant grain. The council was not enthusiastic about this step, and warned the Protestants in advance, such that the yield when the confiscations took place was meagre. In total, Châlons presented 560 setiers of grain, an amount that could not meet the royal army's needs, and the council remonstrated on the matter.

Anjou had arrived in Châlons by 21 December. From here he advised the seigneur de Matignon to pay off the arquebusiers of the baron de Larchant, which had arrived in Rouen, and then dismiss them.

==== Notre-Dame-de-l'Épine ====
On the approach to Châlons on 21 December, the maréchal de Cossé was able to seize the château de Sarry, a little way south of the city. He failed to commit his cavalry, and the Protestants were able to withdraw. The comte de Brissac reconnoitred Châlons, inducing casualties among the Protestants (with several captains defeated, and the soldiery captured and killed). Subsequently, the royal army entered Châlons, and time was lost on the account of the illness of the maréchal de Cossé. The duc d'Aumale requested that he receive reinforcements to engage the enemy, but rather than respond decisively, Anjou dispatched the seigneur de Mauvissière to him. The vanguard of the royal army snapped at the Protestant heels, with the duc de Nemours and Martigues engaging the Protestant rearguard. In the opinion of the contemporary Mauvissière, had the royalists fully engaged the disorganised Protestants, they would have crushed them. However, in his council, opinion was divided on how to proceed. Nemours was eager for battle and fumed at the opposition. Cossé, who (according to the diarist Brantôme) had been instructed by Catherine to avoid seeing the army of her young and inexperienced son committed to the uncertainties of battle, pushed against engaging the enemy, and ultimately the battle of the army would not be brought up into the fight. This allowed the Protestants, who saw the risk of their being surrounded, to slip out of Notre-Dame de l'Épine on the night of 22-23 December.

There was much Catholic anger directed against the maréchal de Cossé over his perceived responsibility for this failure, with his being decried as a traitor. Similarly, the seigneur de Carnavalet was lampooned as being in league with the prince de Condé.

Upon hearing of the Protestant bolting, Anjou ordered the duc d'Aumale and duc de Nevers to rally to him, instructing Nevers to make for Ligny. Anjou passed through Saint-Julien-de-Courtiroles on 23 December, later that day arriving in Vitry-le-François. From Saint-Julien-de-Courtiroles, Anjou wrote to the duc de Nemours, asking him to appraise him of the status of the enemy. He also asked that Nemours execute his plan of attack, of which Anjou was highly complementary. It was important Nemours informed him of this so that he might alert the forces of the count of Arenberg as well as the battle of the army (the main body). He also requested that the nearby city of Sainte-Menehould furnish him with 40,000 loaves of bread and twenty muids of grain, an amount that caused the city council to protest.

Sometime around this point, a certain Guy de Saint-Gelais, son of the seigneur de Lanssac, was captured by the Protestants. This fact was grieved over by the king, who resolved to see him swapped in a prisoner exchange as soon as possible. Having arrived at Vitry-le-François on 23 December, Anjou wrote to Condé, offering safe conduct for a hundred horsemen under the command of a certain Robert de Combault to travel from Bar-le-Duc to Paris, and requesting the release of Guy de Saint-Gelais.

The duc d'Anjou took Christmas in Vavray-le-Grand. From Vavray-le-Grand on 25 December, the duc d'Anjou wrote to the duc de Nevers. He urged the latter to link up with him eight leagues out from Vitry-le-François. This was followed by another letter the following day, in which Nevers was urged to send forth 500 cavalrymen to scatter the enemy that had gathered at Nogent and Pont-sur-Seine.

In a despatch of 25 December, the Spanish ambassador Álava related to Philip a meeting he had enjoyed with the queen mother Catherine in the Tuileries Garden. In Champion's telling, Catherine was in the gardens with the seigneur de Saint-Sulpice, and seigneur de La Mothe-Fénelon when she was approached by Álava, who little trusted the inclinations of either man. She inquired of him as to Philip II, but Álava was of a mission, and cried that Philip did not wish her to be the murderer of her son. Catherine took Álava off into a corner of the garden and explained away the current military situation by arguing that the duc d'Anjou was but a child and that the leaders of the army did not wish to proffer battle but were rather taken with negotiating with the enemy. Álava rebuffed this reasoning, arguing that Catherine was to blame for surrounding her son with incompetent men. In his estimation, Cossé was an irrelevancy who she could dismiss if she saw fit, Nemours was too distracted by his love life, and Montpensier was an idiot. He urged her to recall them, and replace them with a man of war like the seigneur de Tavannes. The ambassador raised the example of Louis XI for the queen mother, but she was as aware of her history as he was. Catherine assured him she would order the duc de Nemours to proffer battle with 4,000 to 5,000 cavalry, and that if he would not give battle she would grant the task to the seigneur de Martigues. She noted that the duc de Nevers, a wise man, would remain with the young prince. Despite these various assurances, Álava remained sceptical of Anjou's army. Álava's extreme attitude, going so far as to threaten the continuity of the Franco-Spanish alliance, brought him in for rebuke from Catherine, who protested that he had now slipped into the mould of his predecessor Chantonnay. Though Philip and Alba concurred with Álava's opinions, they did not appreciate the manner in which he imparted them to Catherine. The queen mother should be treated with respect and tact. Álava should have found a way to impart these views without inspiring conflict with Catherine.

Come 27 December, while still stationed at Vavray-le-Grand, Anjou ordered the duc de Nevers to go with his troops to Chavagnes, where he might unite with the royal army. This was to be instead of going to the abbey of Viron.

Exhortations from the king to hurry continued, and in a letter of 29 December he reiterated the importance of preventing the juncture of the Protestants with their mercenaries.

==== Vitry-le-François ====
Word had reached Charles that Martigues had caught the rearguard of the rebel Protestant army and engaged it, but that Anjou had not acted decisively, allowing the Protestant rebels to slip away. Álava wrote to the duke of Alba on this matter on 29 December, noting the failure to take advantage of the high waters of the Moselle and Meuse around this time of year.

The king, frustrated at this news, vented his frustrations to his brother in a letter of 2 January. He chastised Anjou for having failed to provide the support to the duc d'Aumale that was required, noting that had reinforcements been provided in the way he suggested, the situation would have developed more favourably for the royalist cause. Rather than immediately proffer support after receiving word from Aumale, Anjou had dispatched the seigneur de Mauvissière to the commander. This was a waste of time in Charles' opinion when decisive action was needed.

By 2 January 1568, the army was to be found in Vitry-le-François, with the duc d'Anjou ordering the maréchal de Cossé, the duc de Nemours, and seigneur de Matignon to link back up with the main royal army. That same day, he updated Charles on the status of his army. He explained the maintenance of 2,000 Swiss under his command to this point. These Swiss had left to join with the king on the morning of 2 January under the command of the duc de Thouars along with the companies of the seigneur de Sanssac and de Caillac. The duc de Nemours and maréchal de Cossé were to scout the villages around Saint-Dizier. He advised the king that the soldiers of the governor of Montreuil were not completely paid. Here, the royal army was joined by the duc de Nevers, who brought with him Swiss and Italian reinforcements numbering around 13,000. Nevers' arrival at Vitry-le-François meant that the company of the comte de Brissac under his command was briefly reunited with its commander.

Anjou conducted a review of the new troops that Nevers had brought up to the army, with a salvo being fired in his honour, and the troops also undertaking a small skirmish for the occasion. Exhausted by their march, and the taking of Mâcon, the performance of the troops was desultory, and an embarrassment to the comte de Brissac.

Anjou wrote to his brother again on 3 January from Vitry. He explained that he and his captains had examined the routes the enemy, who was to be found at Pont-à-Mousson, might follow. He intended to take a wait-and-see approach, awaiting the Protestant departure before engaging in pursuit, though he intended to get the opinions of the seigneur de Tavannes and duc d'Aumale on this point. He also requested receipt of 1,200 cavalry. Writing to his mother Catherine, he expressed a desire to countermand the order of the previous day by which the companies the duc de Thouars and Sanssac departed the army, in addition to having already countermanded the departure of the Swiss, so that he might come down in force against the enemy. The sieur de La Roche-Posay would explain the need for the duke of Alba to provide the additional 1,200 horse, which could be peeled off from soldiers Alba held in Luxembourg so they could join with those of the count of Arenberg in the French royal army.

By 4 January, Anjou had received the two letters sent to him by the crown. He explained how he had these letters read out to the various grandees and captains of the royal army, with their deliverer (the seigneur des Roches) providing supplementary details as appropriate. They affirmed the existing plan to await the Protestant departure from Pont-à-Mousson before striking out. Such a wait and see approach, he assured Charles, was endorsed by the duc d'Aumale, seigneur de Tavannes and duc de Guise. Nemours and Cossé, who had reconnoitred Saint-Dizier had not found a suitable place for the army to lodge.

Having faced protest from the city of Châlons about the requisition of grain, Anjou assured the city on 4 January that going forward grain would not be taken from the city. However, it would still be necessary for Châlons to provide a boat of wheat and another of oats to supply Paris. He would ensure that it would only be one boat of each that was taken.

Catherine arrived in Châlons on 4 January, and there met with her son Anjou. As she had been advised by Álava, she installed the seigneur de Tavannes with the army. Though as the leader of the vanguard, rather than a replacement for Anjou's current military leadership. A further opportunity from her visit to the front was to be found in meeting with the cardinal de Châtillon (who, along with the comte de La Rochefoucauld arrived in Châlons the evening of 4 January). The occasion of her visit allowed for the resolution of conflicts among the fractious army command. The Montmorency brothers around this time came to blows with the comte de La Vauguyon who accused them of being traitors for their supposed sympathy to the rebel leadership. Montpensier and the duc d'Aumale also verbally sparred.

Catherine convened a council of war, to investigate the reasons for military failure so far. Montpensier was little interested in reflecting on past losses and looked forward to progress to come. The seigneur de Tavannes stingingly critiqued the approach of the army so far. They had blown the opportunity in the wake of the battle of Saint-Denis to crush the Protestants in only a few hours, dithered too long in Nemours, failed to hinder the Protestant passage across the Meuse. Going forward, they should look to block the Protestants from crossing the Seine and impede access to Orléans.

Catherine asked the duc d'Aumale to remain close with her son in combat, to fortify his courage. She counselled Anjou to listen to the advice he received.

In correspondence with his mother on 5 January, Anjou forwarded for her attentions several correspondences he had received relating to the hiring of German mercenaries, as well as a letter from the maréchal de Vielleville. He argued that an arrangement with the mercenary Mandesloh was more favourable than that made with the count of Rockendorf, whose terms he had received.

Anjou and the army departed from Vitry on 8 January to make towards Troyes. Around this time, the army was at its peak strength, numbering 72,000 men. Of these, the duc de Nevers brought to bear twenty-six companies of foot (around 2,800 men) and the duc d'Aumale thirty-four companies of cavalry (3,060 men). Around 46,000 of these troops were French, to 26,000 foreign, with one-hundred-and-fifty-four companies of French foot, one-hundred-and-forty-three gendarme companies, and thirty-three companies of Swiss among others. The compagnies d'ordonnance were employed in a different manner to prior years by the crown, operating on a more intensive basis. If the troops in royal garrisons were included, king Charles had raised an army of around 100,000 men, with around 60,000 to be found in Champagne. Despite this, Charles would reverse his position on forcing a decisive battle, explaining that he did not wish to allow his kingdom, and his nobles, to hang in the balance in such a scenario.

== Return from Lorraine ==
=== Condé and Coligny march east ===
The Protestant force, supplemented by the Germans, now numbered around 20,000 men, and could think of turning around to take the fight back into France. Their return followed a more southerly course, passing between Bar-sur-Aube and Chaumont as they crossed the Marne and Aube rivers, before slipping by Châtillon-sur-Seine in Burgundy where the Seine had frozen (while steering clear of the royal position to the north in Troyes. The river Yonne was forded at Auxerre; the country being put to ransom as they marched. Then, approaching the Loing, the army swung northwards, making their crossing of the river at Montargis. Prior to their entry to Montargis, their cornets had fanned the country around the city, as well as the Gâtinais, and to the approaches of Paris itself. Charles was of the opinion that Montargis was an important place that Condé's army must not be allowed to capture. The King therefore urged his brother to secure permission from Renée to make passage through the city, and then station men there. Renée was little inclined to depart from the city, so Charles noted on 1 February that it was likely she would not be comfortable there, surrounded by so many men of war. He advised that she withdraw to Vincennes, Fontainebleau, or another place of her choosing. As the Protestant army made for the river Loire from Montargis, it was further reinforced by the southern vicomtes army (viscounts) de Montclar and de Bruniquel who brought up soldiers from Quercy, Périgord and the Rouergue. The southern Protestant force had captured Beaugency before linking up with Condé's army, and the combined force numbered some 30,000 men. Condé crossed the river Loire around La Charité, entering the Beauce.

They then moved to assault Blois, with 5,000 infantry, 400 cavalry, and four cannons putting the place to siege under the command of the southern general, the seigneur de Mauvans. Defending the city, the seigneur de Richelieu, who had for his garrison eight hundred men. Blois fell to the Protestants on 6 February. Anjou had dispatched a certain La Rivière with arquebusiers to relieve Blois, however, the king observed in a letter of 14 February, that now the city had fallen, these soldiers served no purpose going to Blois and should rather be moved on to aid in the defence of Amboise or Tours. Having secured the city’s capitulation, Mauvans did not keep to the agreement he had made with the inhabitants, justifying himself that the Catholics never did so with the Protestants.

With the fall of Blois, Condé resolved on putting Chartres to siege. The Protestants were poor in artillery, and thus their approach had to orientate around surprise and speed.

=== Anjou on the defensive ===
==== Troyes ====
In the royal camp it was not known where the reinvigorated Protestant army would strike. The duc d'Anjou moved to protect Troyes, from where he might impede the Protestant march into Burgundy. He would headquarter himself in Troyes from 12 January to 5 February. Writing to the duc de Nevers on 12 January, the day of his arrival in Troyes, Anjou explained that he had ordered those companies that were in Troyes, those of the duke of Savoy, and the five of the comte de Brissac to come to join with the duc de Nevers. By means of providing these troops to Nevers, the latter would be able to face the enemy with confidence and not shy away from such an encounter. As for Anjou, he was unsure as to whether he should make for Auxerre, and would liaise with his advisers. The duc de Nevers meanwhile went to defend Auxerre through establishing himself at Châtillon-sur-Seine.

By 13 January, Catherine was back in Paris, Charles having travelled out to meet with her. In her absence, there had been Gascon infantry in the capital to assure his security.

Not all of Anjou's communiques related to sensitive military matters. In his correspondence of 13 January with the king, he sought to secure exemption from monetary contributions to the fortification of cities for his servants, as well as a similar exemption for his brother and sister. In addition to this request, he looked to see a certain captain de La Berthe appointed as gentilhomme de la chambre du roi (a ceremonial position in the king's household).

Discussing the Protestant's movements with Catherine on 13 January, Anjou dismissed the idea they intended to march up into Picardy. Rather he argued they intended to make for Auxerre and Orléans. This was the location the Gascons were converging on also. The next day, Anjou made a request through his mother for four cannons to be shipped from Paris to Auxerre to aid in the defence of the city, along with 2,000 cannonballs and powder. He would follow up on this request on 15 January, providing further details on the process by which the cannons would come to Auxerre. The operation would be overseen by the seigneur de La Bourdaisière (Grand Master of Artillery).

A rumour spread through the royal army around mid-January, that peace had been reached between the rebel Protestants and the crown. Keen to avoid this rumour leading to desertions, king Charles wrote to express his confusion at the news on 14 January, urging the duc d'Anjou to ensure this false report did not continue to spread. Charles assured his brother that payment had been prepared for the entire royal gendarmerie, and would arrive on 1 February. Concurrently to this, the king wrote happily that favourable military developments against the Protestants were to be found elsewhere in the kingdom, specifically against the baron d'Acier in Provence.

Anjou wrote a despatch on 14 January ordering that the army’s cannon be moved by barge from Paris to Melun in anticipation of an attack against Auxerre, taking advantage of the kingdom's waterways. The cannons would return to the Paris arsenal from Châlons-sur-Marne in February.

From Troyes, Anjou informed the inhabitants of Châlons on 16 January of his intent to head out to confront the enemy. Resultingly, he would like for them to keep 100 mulds of flour on standby.

Anjou was appraised around this time, by the maréchal de Vielleville who was established in Metz, that his own German mercenaries, those of the duke of Saxony, had crossed the Rhine on their way into France on 16 January. The duc d'Anjou entrusted a certain Pasquier with greeting these mercenaries and bringing them to unite with the royal army.

A skirmish having taken place between the royalists and Provençal rebels, Anjou entrusted the seigneur du Crocq with relating news of the engagement to Catherine on 18 January, and noted that he concurred with his council that those soldiers that had participated in the battle be given garrison duty in the Loire, in addition to the light horse in his own army for which he lacked the ability to provide wages.

Anjou expressed his enthusiasm, on 23 January, for the royal order to sequester the property of Protestants. He noted that the Protestant's extracted forced levies from towns and abbeys by threatening to burn them down, and that he would send his chancellor, the comte de Cheverny to request of the king that regardless of the consequences Charles should order his subjects to refuse this Protestant blackmail. To support his chancellor travelling to the court, he also asked Catherine to lend her voice to his plan to stop the people of France yielding to Protestant blackmail. The same day, he requested in a separate communique that Charles send a captain to command Montargis, which was then felt to be at risk. For the purpose of the defence of Montargis, he thought it might be wise to ask Renée to depart from her city for a while. He also cancelled his prior request of cannons for Auxerre, at which he no longer planned to halt. The situation in relation to Auxerre had evolved due to the advance of the enemy, and the delay in receipt of the reiters.

A little while before 24 January, the duc d'Anjou looked to resolve a conflict among his officers. Dispute had arisen between the seigneur de Méru a moderate Catholic open to accommodation with Protestantism and the vicomte de Martigues a zealous Catholic. In this quarrel, Martigues had slapped the seigneur de Méru, and the soldiers of the two men were ready to come to blows. Anjou felt this episode was of great damage to the morale of the army. This affair was reported upon by the Spanish ambassador Álava, who knew it would please his King. He noted that with the two men had been in Anjou's presence when a dispute emerged during which Martigues put his hand on his dagger. For the next four days, this poisonous dispute continued to defy attempts at reconciliation. On 24 January, Anjou wrote to Charles on the matter, he noted that he hoped for the arbitration of the baron de Damville and maréchal de Montmorency on the matter, as well as the King's own opinion. He would seek update on the arbitration of this quarrel from the maréchal de Montmorency on 3 February. In another instance of officer dissatisfaction, the duc de Nemours was put out by the failure of a client of his named La Rue to receive command of a company.

Writing to the cardinal de Lorraine on 27 January, Anjou ordered the seigneur de La Vieuville to make his departure from Rethel for Mézières. He signed off on the dismissal of the cardinal's soldiers and concurred with Lorraine on the need to garrison Château-Porcien.

On 28 January, Anjou requested of his mother Catherine that trials involving officers in his army be suspended until the end of the troubles, the same privilege they enjoyed in foreign wars. He also renewed his request for cannons, six this time. This request was made to Charles in parallel. To Charles, he provided documents that had been found on the Protestants. He appraised Charles that Nevers had informed him of his intention to strike at the Protestants near Chaumont.

Anjou counselled the seigneur de Fervacques on 30 January to assure himself of the safety from Protestant attack of his fr:château de Grancey before he came to link up with the royal army in Troyes. Having received update from the duc de Nevers, he expressed his confidence in the judgement of the duc as to the wisdom of garrisoning Montbard. The prince complained of the pillaging undertaken by the Italian units of the army.

At the end of January, Charles communicated to his brother the duc d'Anjou that rather than referring matters of payment back to the court, that he resolve himself on the proper distribution of money provided to him by the crown. The king was keen that the expenses of the army be curtailed. He noted that he had previously instructed Anjou to conduct a review of his soldiery, to ensure payment was not being granted to non-existent soldiers. The seigneur de Carnavalet was entrusted by the king with reviewing the army's finances, alongside the maréchal de Cossé (who had formerly served as the surintendant des finances for the kingdom).

A report of 1 February by the English noted a certain chevalier Battres, who is to have told the King that he would rather risk Charles's displeasure than soil himself in the blood of his kinsmen through involvement in the fighting of the civil war.

The commander of the royal army found it necessary to scold the city of Joigny on 2 February for their refusal to accept a garrison of five companies of foot and one company of mounted arquebusiers. He warned the place that if they continued to obstinately refuse this royal order, they would be subject to exemplary punishment as rebels. They were to immediately accommodate them upon receipt of his letter, as well as affording them provisions.

With the trésorier de l'extroardinaire des guerres Antoine Fayet due to bring 5,000 livres for the royal army, Anjou advised the comte de Brissac to facilitate his arrival in Troyes on 4 February. By February, a third of the gendarme companies of the royal army were in arrears for their wages dating back to the first quarter of 1567. While the other two-thirds had taken payment of their second quarter on the outset of the campaign, they were over half a year in arrears themselves. As the campaign wore on, the infantry too were increasingly unpaid. The only soldiers able to count on a reliable wage were the royal Swiss, and the Flemish gendarmes who were paid for by the Spanish crown. During February, Charles gave order to the comte de Brissac and seigneur de Strozzi, to cease to employ halberds in their infantry companies, discarding the weapon in favour of the arquebus. This left the infantry companies to use just arquebuses and pikes.

Anjou advised Renée, the duchess of Ferrara, on 4 February, that he had sent a captain Bonavie to reinforce Montargis, with eight companies of foot. She was to accommodate this force. The following day he informed her he had dispatched the seigneur de Thoré to take charge in Montargis. Renée not only refused to withdraw from Montargis, but she further refused the royal soldiers entry into the city. It had first been the seigneur de Thoré who was entrusted with leading the royal soldiers into the city, but little desiring to anger Renée he refused the charge. It was instead given to the seigneur de Losses and seigneur de Chavigny. Aware his aunt might refuse these men entry, Charles cautioned Anjou to provide for them well, so they were not trapped between the walls of Montargis and the Protestant army.

Writing to the French court on 5 February 1568, the ambassador Fourquevaux outlined a new approach to the composition of the gendarmerie that he thought would well counter the Protestant reiters.

With the Protestants carving a path of destruction, Anjou resolved to fall back from Troyes and shadow the Protestants. By 7 February he had left the city and was to be found in Saint-Mesmin.

== Chartres campaign ==
=== March north of the Vicomte army ===
==== Consolidation in Alès ====
An army of some 7-8,000 men from Quercy and upper-Languedoc who were gathered in Castres under the leadership of the seven vicomtes: de Bruniquel, de Caumont, de Paulin, de Candars et Panat, de Montamat, de Montclar (also known as the baron d'Ambres), and de Goudon. Their force advanced eastwards into the Cévennes in the winter, arriving in Alès in the Cévennes on 16 November. The baron d’Acier had selected Alès as the assembly point for all southern troops to unite before the march north to join with Condé.

In lower-Languedoc and Dauphiné, a force of 8,000 men were gathered under the baron d’Acier and seigneur de Montbrun. They made their own way to the staging point of Alès, arriving in December.

A third Provençal contingent, under the command of the seigneur de Mauvans, comprising 2,000 infantry and 400 horsemen also joined with the army. Finally, from the Vivarais, the baron d’Arpajon rounded out the army with 300 cavalry.

In totality, the consolidated southern army numbered some 16,000 men, but not all of them would make the journey north to join with Condé. There was a keen awareness of the vulnerability of the Dauphinois and Languedoc churches if the territories were to be stripped of soldiers. Thus, d’Acier and Montbrun remained behind with their contingents. It would therefore be the responsibility of the vicomtes and Provençals to make north.

==== March north ====
From the Cévennes, they launched north-east into the Vivarais and Dauphiné. As they progressed, they were pursued by the royalists, and received a difficult defeat at Saint-Agrève that lowered their number to some 4,000, half of which then decided to withdraw back south to upper-Languedoc.

This diminished force crossed the Forez and then the Loire at Saint-Just-Saint-Rambert before making towards Gannat in the Bourbonnais.

==== Bourbonnais force ====
Emerging from the Bourbonnais, a separate column, under the command of the seigneur de Ponsenat and seigneur de Verbelais made for Burgundy from October in the hope of linking up with the German mercenaries of John Casimir. They made it as far as Tournus before being compelled to retreat for Auvergne in the face of a vastly superior Catholic force on 6 December. Towards the end of the month, these rebels faced a crushing defeat, reducing their number to 2,000 men.

On 3 January, the exhausted Bourbonnais troops joined up with the army of the vicomtes. This brought the army up to around 4,000 soldiers.

==== Victory at Cognat ====
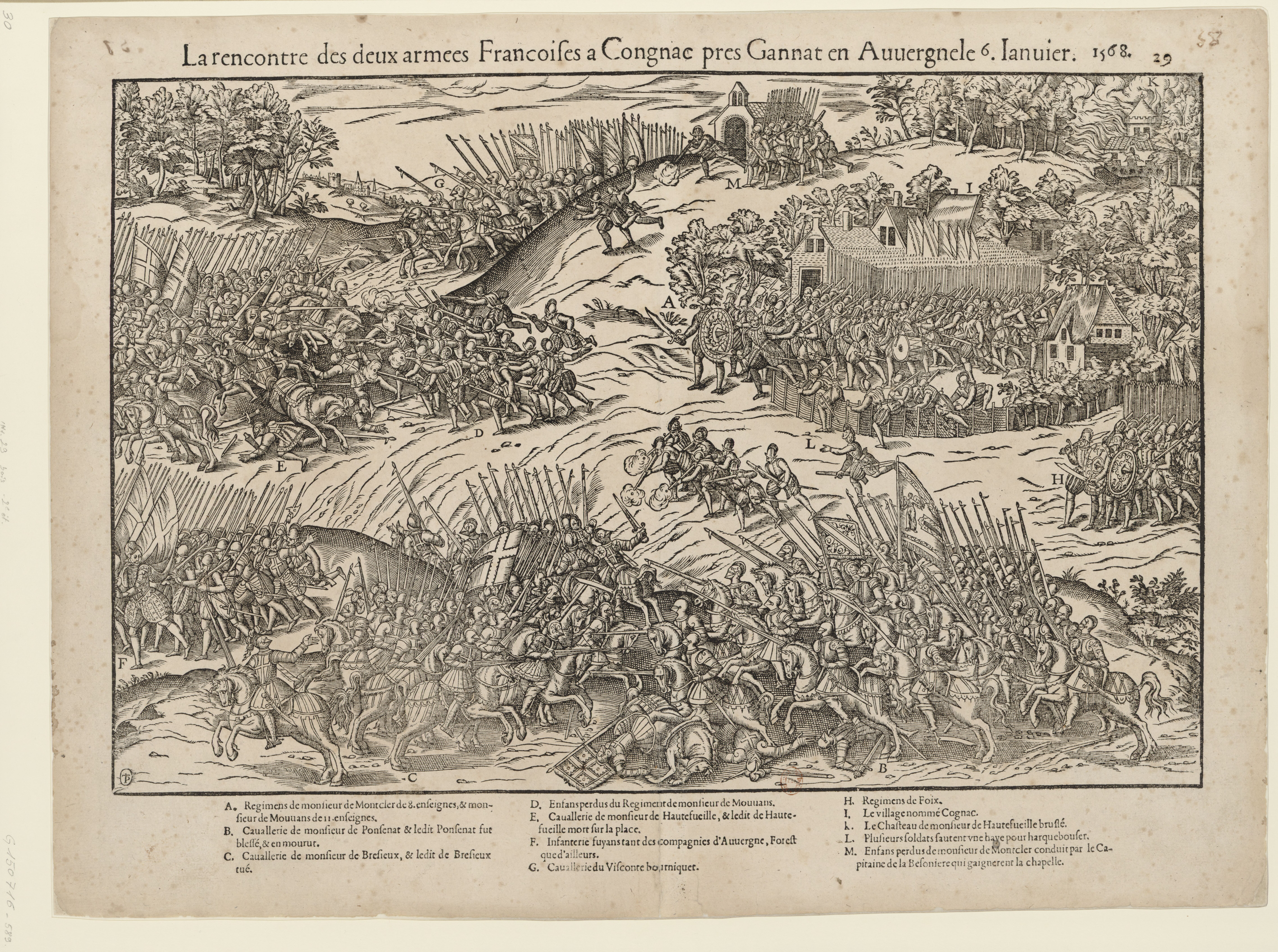
Battle of Cognat at which the army of the vicomtes defeated the royalists seeking to intercept them

The combined army crossed the Allier at Vichy on 4 January.

The army of the vicomtes bested a royalist-Catholic army twice their size at Cognat near Gannat in the Bourbonnais on 6 January 1568. A sympathetic chronicler described the victory as divinely given, the pious soldiers singing psalms as they went into battle. The only tarnish on the victory was the death of the seigneur de Poncenat, victim of a stray bullet from one of his own men.

==== On to Condé ====
The army of the vicomtes then made for Orléans, where the princesse de Condé was to be found under siege by the royalists. First Beaugency and then Blois on 6 February were taken. This accomplished, the army was able to relieve Orléans, receiving reinforcements of 1,200 infantry and 400 cavalry to march with on to Chartres, where they could link up with the prince de Condé’s army.

=== Before the city ===
The chevalier de Monluc advised Renée on 6 February that he had orders from the duc d'Anjou to enter Montargis with his 10 companies. From Saint-Mesmin on 7 February, Anjou appraised the duc de Nevers that if Renée would not accept the passage of the chevalier de Monluc's force through her city, that the bands should lodge at Nemours.

Having moved on to Pont-sur-Seine that same day, Anjou again wrote Nevers. He advised the duc to tarry a few days around Sens, so that he might guard Joigny and Villeneuve-le-Roi. In a more specific request, he asked Nevers to allocate one-hundred horsemen to accompany a silver convoy from Sens to Nogent, where he anticipated arriving imminently.

Anjou would reach Nogent on 7 February and write to Nevers for a third time that day. He wrote with regret that three companies had had a defeat inflicted upon them, and requested Nevers send forward La Valette with his companies of light horse to Joigny and Villeneuve-le-Roi, noting that he intended to tarry at Nogent for a couple of days. Nevers was again the subject of Anjou's correspondence on 9 February, in a contradictory letter in which Nevers was urged to maintain himself where he was to defend Joigny and Villeneuve-le-Roi, but also to come join with Anjou at Nogent. In a new correspondence of the same day, this latter command was affirmed, with Nevers urged to see to the garrisoning of the city of Nevers and La Charité and then come to join Anjou with the rest of his army.

That same day, Anjou capitulated to Renée, assuring her that as she desired, royal troops would not in fact be sent into Montargis.

The English ambassador reported on 9 February, that the cardinal de Lorraine was forced to take flight in February from Reims, after an assault on his coach.

From Nogent-sur-Seine on 10 February, Anjou liaised with the duc de Nemours. The latter was to keep Anjou in the loop as to the progress of the Protestant army, and assault Coligny's force as possible.

Of the understanding that the Protestant army was making for Orléans, Anjou appraised his mother on 11 February that he had dispatched his Swiss soldiers and artillery to the city. He was gathering the rest of his forces at Montereau to determine their future direction. The Protestants would indeed make for Orléans, relieving the city which was under royalist siege, and taking 1,200 infantry and 400 cavalry as reinforcements.

The Protestant cavalry cornets now spread out, isolating vulnerable individuals and conducting pillage around Paris of various farms and churches. With the Protestants close, the population of Paris was jumpy. Trenches were dug, and stockpiling undertaken. The sight of even an isolated Protestant soldier inspired a great reaction.

Thanks were given by Anjou to the duc de Nemours on 12 February, while the prince resided in Provins, for updates Nemours had provided on the movement of the Protestant army. Having arrived at Nangis by 13 February, Anjou was able to express his satisfaction to Nemours at the capture of Autricourt and Villier l'Espaux. He noted that he had done what he could to extract information about the enemy from those captured by Nemours.

Having sent the seigneurs de Montpezat and de Prie to Étampes to assess the viability of holding the place, Anjou noted in his letter of 13 February to the duc de Nemours that he had assessed holding the place as both difficult and of little value based on their reports. As a result, he resolved to send only the captain de Bieq and his company, as well as a further four companies of mounted arquebusiers, who if dislodged from Étampes could retreat along the river. He counselled Nemours to send these four companies to de Bieq in Montereau. He noted that he was also sending a letter to the inhabitants of Étampes to receive de Bieq and the companies. In a similar fashion, Nemours was to provide 2 companies of mounted arquebusiers for the defence of Dourdan, that could retreat towards Chevreuse as required by their circumstances.

As the royal army got increasingly close to Paris, the possibility of men slipping away from the army grew. Charles counselled his brother on 13 February to afford as little leave as he could to the nobles, conducting the army with a strict hand. He advised Anjou to renew the ban général. Anjou afforded full powers in Montereau to the seigneur de Charrieu, and assured him he was seeing to the sending of powder to the place. On the same day, 13 February, he wrote to the seigneur de La Bourdaisière to see the power brought to Montereau.

The day that followed, 14 February, Anjou wrote to the seigneur de Damville to inform him the army was now on the way to Melun. The duc d'Anjou would indeed arrive in Melun for 15 February and took the occasion to write Damville again. He noted that the two men were now only two days apart from one another, and that combat was but a single day's march away. Anjou informed Damville that he would be making his departure from Melun tomorrow. Before his departure, he ordered the comte de Brissac to come and reunite with his regiment. On the matter of garrisons, Anjou wrote to Nemours about the exemplary punishment (death) to be meted out to two or three of the ringleaders of the refusal of the town of Moret to host a garrison.

Updating the king on 17 February, Anjou recorded how the sieur de Riocourt (governor of Chaumont) had intercepted a pack of letters, which Anjou was now forwarding on to the king. Two of them were written by the prince of Orange. They discussed the negotiations undertaken by the bishop of Rennes, as well as news from England, Flanders and the Levant. Also in the pack was a letter the Count Palatine had written to Charles, who excused the money he had given to the prince de Condé on the grounds it was not intended to provide aid to him, but simply to preserve the Protestant faith. Anjou left it up to the king to form his thoughts on the Count Palatine's questionable actions. Several ciphered letters were also among the intercepted materials, that he advised Charles to see to the cracking of.

As the royal army trailed the Protestant army through pillaged country, it slowly haemorrhaged to desertions. Withdrawing from the army to the south of Paris, Anjou made for Villeneuve-Saint-Georges to liaise with his mother.

Anjou anticipated the arrival of the German mercenaries of the duke of Saxony, as well as those of the marquis of Baden, who Anjou had been informed by the maréchal de Vielleville, had abandoned his allegiance to John Casimir.

On 18 February, Anjou was at Corbeil with the seigneur de Tavannes, the duc d'Aumale and the seigneur de Martigues. From here, he could see the lights of the Protestant campfires in the distance. He wrote congratulations to Renée on this day that she had not permitted the Protestants to enter her city of Montargis. He quickly resolved to return to Paris, entering the city on 19 February. There, he hurried to the Louvre where he was embraced by the king. The duc d'Anjou would establish the royal camp at Chartreux, just outside the walls of Paris. With much of the army quartered in the capital, even the firmly Catholic city began to desire the coming of peace.

With the royal army in Paris, freedom was afforded to the combined French Protestant and German mercenary army to lay siege to Chartres. This city was a source of grain for the capital. In addition to this it housed a great cathedral, the destruction of which could be an ideological victory.

From Chartreux on 20 February, Anjou awarded command of the place of Poissy to a certain captain de La Tour.

On the subsequent day, he wrote a flurry of letters to Bassompierre, Pasquier, and Puygaillard to ascertain the location of, and hurry along, the German mercenaries of Bassompierre and the duke of Saxony.

Also on 21 February, the prince dauphin d'Auvergne was ordered to garrison Châteaudun and Bonneval, Bonneval pending a Protestant siege of Chartres.

=== Siege of Chartres ===
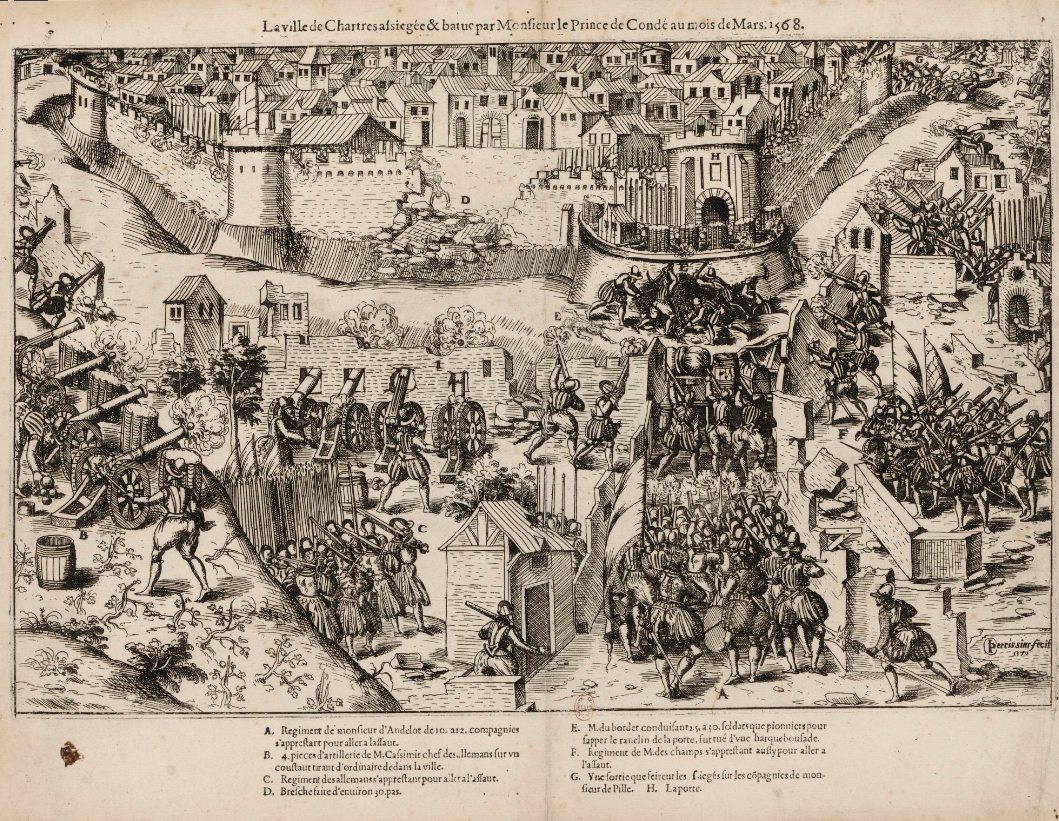
Siege of Chartres at which the prince de Condé and the rebel Protestant army attempted to capture the city

Chartres was governed by the seigneur de Linières for the royalists, who had slipped into the city shortly before the siege was closed with 4,000 royal troops on 24 February, having been appointed to the charge of governor by Anjou on 16 February. The city itself only had 8,000 inhabitants, but it represented a rich urban prize for the Protestants, nestled in the prosperous region of Beauce. One of Linières first acts in the city was to build a new gallows, to establish his authority clearly. He surveyed the city defences, ordering various measures to augment Chartres' security. Plans were made for the provision of victuals to the soldiery, requisitioning and distribution.

On 21 February, the Protestants arrived before Chartres. While 9,000 men encircled the royalist held city, the rest acted as a blocking force to stop any relief. The Protestants had a small artillery battery of nine guns, of which only five were siege worthy, which they set to work on the northern wall around the Drouaise gate. Coligny billeted his cavalry in the villages that surrounded Chartres, and endeavoured to limit pillage by the provision of bakers.

Word that the Protestant artillery train was in Orléans reached the population of Chartres, and motivated their admittance of a troublesome company of Gascons. The final royalist reinforcements, those of the comte de Cerny, entered the city on 26 February. When the city militia was factored in, Linières had at his disposal over 6,000 men to repulse the siege. With such a glut of soldiers at his disposal, Linières could conduct himself vigorously in his sorties, to burn down buildings in the faubourgs, and to harass their efforts.

Among those commanders with Anjou for the Chartres campaign was the seigneur de La Valette, who held command of a compagnie d'ordonnance of thirty lances. The duc d'Anjou dispatched La Valette with eighteen cornets of cavalry to Chartres. This force was bested by that of the admiral de Coligny, but without many casualties.

At some point before 25 February, the duc de Nemours retired from the royal army to Paris, his wife at this time suffering from an illness.

The full force of the besieging army had arrived at Chartres by 28 February and took up their positions around the city. Condé sited his artillery by the Drouaise gate on 2 March. While this choice had advantages, it was a terrible location for the guns. There were weaker points in the walls, and breaches made here were easy to fall back from.

Suppressive fire followed for several days, before a serious bombardment by the nine Protestant artillery pieces on 5 March. On 7 March, a large section of the northern wall collapsed, and the Protestants resolved to make a general assault. The royal soldiers inside Chartres were able to meet the Protestant assault and repulse it, with the support of the citizens of Chartres and benefitting from the strength of the garrison. Ardelay, captain of the Gascons took a headwound while defending against a diversionary attack the Protestants had launched on the far side of Chartres. He would survive for a couple of weeks before dying. Later appraised of Ardelay's death by Linières, Anjou ordered that he be given a lavish funeral and buried in the great church of Chartres. Though the cathedral chapter protested, the King endorsed Anjou's order. The cathedral chapter pretended to consent but subsequently dug up Ardelay's body and re-sited it.

The next day, the Protestants attempted to enlarge the breach, but inside the city, containment works had already been established thanks to the efforts of the townspeople. A new assault was met with charges of scrap iron fired from a gun the defenders had nicknamed la Huguenote. After a reconnaissance, Condé concluded the breach offered no prospects for success and started to redeploy the guns.

Condé then repositioned the Protestant battery, but the moment had passed, and the Protestant army bled to desertions. By the end of the siege of Chartres, 300-400 of the besiegers had died, and around 250 royal troops inside Chartres. Civilian casualties are unknown, but a further 500 royal soldiers were either wounded or sick.

On 17 March, Linières was able to report that the Protestants had withdrawn from Chartres.

=== Chartreux ===
Writing to the maréchal de Matignon on 1 March from his camp at Les Chartreux, Anjou advised he see to the protection of lower Normandy. In particular the towns of Verneuil, Lisieux and Pont-Audemer. The next day, Anjou wrote to the city of Dreux, to inform them that he had appointed a certain Saint-Rémy to command in the city. They would need to accommodate infantry inside the centre of Dreux, while mounted arquebusiers were housed in the suburbs. These troops were only passing through, and Dreux would not be expected to victual them. La Bourdaisière would provide gunpowder for the city.

Writing to the comte de Tende on 3 March, Anjou urged him to do what he could to prevent the forces of the baron d'Acier from linking back up with the main Protestant army. As necessary he was to seek the assistance of the baron de Gordes, comte de Suze, baron des Adrets, seigneur d'Urfé, Saint-Herem, Saint-Chamond and Montaré to this end.

Anjou entrusted, on 4 March, the duc d'Aumale to have charge of the royal army in his absence and informed the army of this on that day. Come 6 March he was to be found in Paris, before having returned to Les Chartreux on 7 March.

On 6 March, members of the Scots guard were put to death. A mutiny in the guard had seen thirty desert to their old commander, the Protestant comte de Montgommery. Fighting under Montgommery, they had come off the worse in a skirmish with royal forces under the command of the duc de Nevers near Châtillon.

According to the report of the Venetian ambassador on 6 March, Tours spared itself from capture by the Protestants only by the opening of its levees.

The seigneur de La Valette subsequently requested of Anjou the use of 2,000 to 3,000 horse to make for Montfort. Anjou communicated his assent to this to La Valette on 8 March and alerted him to the fact he had asked the duc d'Aumale to satisfy the request. He would indeed write to the duc d'Aumale the same day to see that order executed. In addition to this he had dispatched the seigneur de Bassompierre to Aumale and planned to also dispatch the seigneur de Saint-Amand so that they might see what they could do in relation to Chartres and Pontgouin. The seigneur de La Meilleraye was to be peeled off to see to the defence of Vernon.

On 11 March, the duc d'Anjou wrote to the seigneur de Monluc disapprovingly. He noted that various Gascon captains had deserted the royal army, taking two months' pay with them that had been intended for the men. This included the chevalier de Monluc (the seigneur de Monluc's son). He asked that, when these men had travelled back to Gascony, that they be arrested and subject to exemplary punishment.

For the relief of the people of Cravant, Anjou ordered, on 12 March, that the seigneur de La Ferté and his company depart the place. They were to join with the seigneur de Barbezieux.

Back in Paris on 15 March, Anjou offered his congratulations to the seigneur de Matignon on his success in returning peace to areas of lower Normandy that had been troubled by Protestant activity. Further plaudits for his efforts to recapture Carentan alongside the company of the seigneur de Vassé.

It would be from Paris that the final flurry of Anjou's letters of the war was delivered. On 16 March he inquired of the seigneur de Saint-Léger as to the progress of the enemy. On the same day he wrote to the seigneur d'Espaulx to disband the company of a certain captain Hue which was no longer required for the defence of Châlons. The next day he alerted the seigneur de Fervacques that the duc d'Aumale would send him reinforcements so that he might bring the money in his possession to the army. Aumale was sent a similar letter requesting he provide the troops to Fervacques to serve as the escort. A few days later, 19 March, Anjou wrote again to Aumale, this time on the matter of Normandy. He was to remove his cavalry from the Pays de Caux so that Rouen would not want for supplies.

With the payment of soldiers proving to be difficult, Condé withdrew to Orléans with his Gascon soldiers, no longer able to pose a threat to Paris.

== Peace of Longjumeau ==
=== Edict of Longjumeau ===
Various difficulties necessitated a push for peace. Money was running low, famine loomed, and disease ran rampant. This paucity of money was as true for Condé and the rebels as it was for the crown. The Spanish ambassador, Álava, was dismissive about the idea that want of money was the driver towards peace.

The war was brought to a close by the peace of Longjumeau, signed by the maréchal de Montmorency for the crown on 22 March and then Condé and Coligny for the Protestant rebels on 23 March 1568. Condé and the majority of the Protestant nobility were pleased to see the return of peace, while the admiral de Coligny had hoped to continue pressing the fight. The Protestant pastors were likely not consulted, in contrast to their consultation before the signing of the edict of Amboise in 1563.

The terms offered essentially a repeat of those of the edict of Amboise from five years previous. Notably however, the province of Provence found itself included in the terms of the peace as regarded the toleration of Protestantism. The edict started by reaffirming the terms of the edict of Amboise without any of the modifications subsequently imposed upon it. Despite the Protestant negotiators' hopes, Protestantism would remain illegal in the city prévôté and vicomté of Paris, and bi-confessional chambers in the parlements were not established. However, restrictions on the limitations imposed on seigneurs of high justice as concerned the practice of Protestantism on their estates were lifted. This was on condition they did not use the assemblies for any ulterior purposes. Leagues and confraternities were specifically prohibited. A general amnesty was afforded to the Protestant rebels who were to be restored to their property, office and dignities.

Condé in particular was affirmed as the King's good subject, relative and servant. The crown agreed to pay off the German mercenaries that the Protestants had hired. 100,000 écus was immediately lent to Condé by the King to pay off John Casimir's mercenaries on the condition he repay the sum within a year. Both sides were to disengage their forces from one another and disarm immediately. Condé was amnestied for having undertaken unofficial embassies with foreign realms, as well as his minting of money, fortification of towns and manufacture of artillery. All places held by the Protestants were to be returned to the agents of the crown immediately. Similarly, any places seized from the clergy returned. The parlements were to publish the edict immediately, and governors and lieutenant-generals were to publish it even before the parlements had approved of the edict. There was to be no litigation relating to property and revenues that had been extracted during the course of the war up to three post publication date for the parlement of Paris, and eight days after publication for the other parlement jurisdictions. All offences during the time of war were subject to an act of oblivion. No places of surety were granted to the Protestants (Condé having previously sought the granting of La Rochelle and Boulogne), who would have to rely on the good faith of the crown.

This peace was the first to describe the Protestants as being of 'the so-called reformed religion' (in French: "La Religion prétendue réformée"). In prior times they had been referred to as 'the religion they say is reformed'. Le Roux characterises this stylistic change as one that was more insulting towards Protestantism, and notes that it would become the standard royal characterisation of Protestantism going forward.

=== Paying the reiters ===
Breaking down the debt that was owed to the Protestant reiters, Daussy divides the sum as follows. Firstly, the Protestants had only paid around a quarter of the 100,000 écus the Germans were owed for their January service. They had entirely failed to pay them in February and March. There was also the sum to be paid for the month it would take them to return home. To this sum was added a further two months' worth of pay built up during the negotiations between the seigneur de Mauvissière and the Elector Palatine at the instruction of Charles. Through this effort, the sum that was owed to the mercenaries was reduced to 1,400,000 livres.

Charles now owed the reiters the Protestants had raised in the Empire around 1,000,000 livres. He would have to indicate also that the Count Palatine's son John Casimir, had been transferred into royal service. If paid this large sum, the mercenaries promised to leave the kingdom within fifteen days. During March, Charles attempted to raise this sum from Paris. To achieve this, he imposed a contribution upon them amounting to 1,400,000 livres. The advances he received by this means allowed for the removal from the kingdom of Condé's reiters, the royal mercenaries from Saxony, the soldiers of the duke of Savoy, and those of the count of Arenberg. Charles also looked to the city of Caen, which boasted a large amount of royal money. A loan was also to be imposed on the bailliage of Caen. Even before Longjumeau was signed, he had looked to see the money transferred from this place, and these efforts continued after peace was declared. The seigneur de Matignon was to ensure the money's escort from Caen to Rouen, and then from Rouen to Paris. It would be the job of the seigneur de Carrouges or duc d'Aumale.

The reiters were to make their departure through the province of Burgundy. Companies of gendarmes were sent to the province to watch over their departure. In a letter to the seigneur de Tavannes, it was advised that the gendarmes were to ensure the speedy and orderly withdrawal of the reiters. To ensure the gendarmes obeyed Tavannes, the King advertised that he had written to them also.

With the vicomte d'Auchy entrusted with command of the gendarmerie, Anjou advised him on 2 April to do what he could to spare the poor people, and stalk Condé's withdrawing forces.

At Auxerre, 50,000 écus that had been intended for the Protestant German reiters were seized by the royal garrison. A nobleman dispatched for the money was subsequently murdered on the orders of the town governor. Coligny reacted with fury to the news.

=== Registration ===
On 25 March the parlement of Paris registered the peace, publishing it on Saturday 27 March. A Catholic mob burst into the parlement of Rouen, expelling the councillors. Three days of rioting followed. In the ensuing carnage, Protestant homes were attacked and looted.

Protestant towns of Languedoc refused to disarm given the hostility shown their commissioner. This allowed the parlement of Toulouse an excuse to refuse to register the edict of Longjumeau until, having received four royal summons to do so, they obeyed on 5 June 1568.

=== Reactions ===
The king expressed his pleasure at the peace to his negotiators on 27 March, writing to the duc de Montmorency. Even though they had accepted the peace, the French crown no longer had faith in the policy of toleration that had been advocated by the chancellor L'Hôpital.

Condé won himself few Protestant friends by the terms of the peace. He was accused of being too credulous in his willingness to trust the word of the king. Spurning him, Protestants turned towards the queen of Navarre. The contemporary memoirist La Noue argues that while Condé was credulous enough to believe in the peace, Coligny did not. The Venetian ambassador opined on 31 March that the peace had only been concluded so that both sides might 'catch their breath'.

Less than a week later, on 31 March, Charles received a delegation of Protestants at the Carthusian convent who had come to offer their submission. The delegates kissed the King's hand.

In general terms, Pernot argues the peace was disregarded by both Protestants and Catholics in places in which they enjoyed relative strength. Murder and leagues proliferated despite the prohibitions of the peace. Condé claimed that 4,000 were murdered in total.

==== Catholic domestic reaction ====
The Catholics rejected the peace negotiated at Longjumeau, judging it as a victory for the Protestants. The Catholic Leagues that had been established in 1563 were re-established in Guyenne, the Agenais and Toulouse. In Paris, the concessions agreed to at Longjumeau were bitterly resented. Catholic priests raged against the peace in their Lenten sermons, with dire consequences predicted for Charles if he did not break himself out of the stupor of support for false prophets. The Protestants needed to be exterminated by force of arms. Protestant houses were assaulted, and those Protestants daring to return to the capital were assaulted. In Bordeaux, the peace was snubbed by the Catholic hierarchy of the city. Three days after the coming of peace, Monluc appointed a certain sieur de Saint-Orens as governor of the city. Saint-Orens, or Tilladet, as he was known, was a trusted captain of Monluc's, and had been involved in the Catholic League of 1563.

Rouen also bore witness to anti-Protestant attacks and pillage when word arrived of the peace. In Amiens, religious violence followed the peace. After a Protestant roofer acted in a 'provocative manner' during Easter time, the Catholics of the parish of Saint-Rémy descended on the Protestants of the area, killing between 150 and 160 of them.

==== Protestant domestic reaction ====
By the end of the war, the Protestant army was already disintegrating, the nobility having returned to their homes.

In Blois, Protestants sacked churches.

==== Spanish reaction ====
The French ambassador Fourquevaux enjoyed an unusual flurry of audiences with Philip around this time, first on 23 March then 2 April and finally 11 April. This would contrast with the relative dearth of meetings with the Spanish sovereign through the remainder of the year.

The breaking of the news of peace to the Spanish was undertaken in several stages. The seigneur de Saint-Héran arrived in Madrid on 27 March, nominally for the purpose of visiting Élisabeth, who had been sickly for some months. Jointly with Fourquevaux he met with Philip II on 2 April. In an effort to sound out Philip's reaction to the concept of peace, it was emphasised that everyone was pushing Charles to come to terms, including the Holy Roman Emperor. Saint-Héran and Fourquevaux then came before Philip again on 11 April. They present the court's despatch of 27 March, which extremely tersely informed Fourquevaux that peace had been agreed (the letter being less than half of the typical length). No justification for the peace was provided. Fourquevaux explained to Philip that he would surely be pleased to learn that the troubles in the kingdom were at an end, thanks to the peace that all the crown's subjects had advised them to make. Philip presented a happy face to the news of the peace, telling Fourquevaux (with a 'cheerful countenance') that he was well pleased they had made a peace they considered advantageous. His attitude contrasted with the rage of his ambassador Álava during the war. Despite the friendly airs Philip had shown, the peace was abhorrent to the Spanish crown. Philip would not send an envoy to protest the peace, and rather left such a step to Álava to undertake. Álava would follow through with the protest but utilising greater restraint than he had previously.

It was the task of the cardinal de Bourbon to explain the merits of the peace to Álava. He explained that it was only through peace, that the Protestants could be destroyed. Charles would receive the occupied towns the Protestants had taken, and he would remain under arms while the rebels disarmed. A matter of concern for the French King was assuring the Spanish that the paid off German mercenaries would not make their way into the Spanish Netherlands in support of the Dutch opposition. Therefore, the King sent an emissary to Spain to explain that he had provided a route the reiters were to follow in writing, a copy of which was provided to the emissary to present to Philip.

The French government attempted the same type of argument that they had in previous years, that once the Protestant reiters had departed the kingdom, the peace would be voided, and Protestants attacked. The Spanish little believed this. Even the French ambassador Fourquevaux, could not disguise his disbelief from Philip. The Spanish king urged Álava to hold the French to the promise nevertheless by letters of 12 April and 4 May. Álava's credit in the French court had been seriously injured by the leaking of a letter he had written to the college of cardinals in Rome, in which he denigrated Catherine. Catherine had shown a copy of the letter to the ambassador, but he dismissed it as a fake.

=== Adhering to the terms ===
==== Demobilisation ====
The regular components of the royal army would not disband. Neither would the Swiss forces of 6,000 men the crown had raised. This gave the king great leverage over the prince de Condé and the Protestants, who had disarmed. The non-Swiss mercenaries would be slowly divested by the crown however. Further, new companies that had been established during the civil war were to be disbanded by the crown, and garrisons reduced to their pre-war size.

The duc d'Anjou maintained his position as lieutenant-general of the kingdom despite the coming of peace.

The soldiery would continue to cause mayhem and destruction against the French people. Hoping to ameliorate this, the King ordered, on 31 March, the redistribution of the compagnies d'ordonnance around the kingdom in such a way that they would be lodged in convenient places, where they did not burden the people.

On this subject, Anjou wrote to the seigneur de Matignon on 31 March. He noted that the companies of the seigneur de Fervacques, Châteauvillain, Matignon (i.e. his own), de Neufbourg and du Brueil had been put at his disposal for distribution across Normandy to ensure the defence of the province. He inquired of the duc de Nemours and seigneur d'Humières to know how they had distributed the soldiers allocated to them by the king for their respective governments.

Writing again to the seigneur d'Humières on 6 April, the duc d'Anjou apologised that it would be necessary to disband the garrison of Péronne for reasons of cost. The only companies that would be maintained in the area were those of the comte de Brissac and comte de Strozzi.

On 8 April, the duc d'Anjou wrote again to Matignon to ensure that he did his best to stop some disbanded troops from descending into brigandage in his province. Alongside his brother, the King also wrote to Matignon on the same theme, urging him to ensure the roads were cleared of soldiers, and the people able to go about their business without fear of being robbed. He advised Matignon approach the scaling down of the companies with tact, so that the disbanded troops did not engage in worse acts than they had while raised. In addition to the local threat, Charles was also conscious of the international threat, as he was of the understanding arquebusiers were assembling in Normandy with the intention of making an intervention in the Netherlands. He therefore advised Matignon of this by a communique of 8 May.

=== Troubles in the south ===
The seigneur de Monluc, and his fellow southern commander Gaches, ignored the peace of Longjumeau. The latter described the peace as a cunning ruse by Catherine that had fooled the gullible Condé. Monluc meanwhile claimed he was monitoring the actions of the queen of Navarre closely, lest she try anything. He critiqued the peace as ill-serving Catholic victims of Protestant violence, what with its provisions relating to the forced forgetting of past crimes. The Catholic forces of the south would not disarm.

Many Protestants were of much the same opinion as Monluc and Gaches on the deceptive nature of the peace and did not disarm themselves. The Protestants felt little hurry in the returning of towns they had seized during the war to royal control. This was the case for the Protestants of Millau. Garrisons and mercenaries were held in service. Those governors that Condé had appointed during the war would remain in their offices. Initially at least, the Protestants held on to the strategic cities of Montpellier, Nîmes, Sommières, Castres, Albi, Millau, La Rochelle, Vézelay, Sancerre, and Montauban. The Protestant army of the vicomtes remained perched near Montauban. Nîmes and Montpellier would come to accept the peace, and the resumption of royal control in their cities.

La Rochelle received a royal governor as part of the peace, the baron de Jarnac. However, the Protestant population would afford him no power. Jarnac was not allowed to bring his soldiers within the walls. Such an approach was followed by many other Protestant southern strongholds.

The vicomte de Joyeuse attempted to enforce the disarmament mandated by the peace of Longjumeau. The effectiveness of this was hampered by his simultaneous contradictory policy in which he prepared men and arms for action in case of an outbreak of hostilities. His military campaigning continued beyond the formal end of the war, with Aramon falling to him.

Elsewhere in the south, fighting continued between the comte de Sommerive, and the Protestant commanders d'Acier and Montbrun, with the royalist Sommerive defeating the latter in a battle by Montfrin.

The butler of the prince de Condé, a certain sieur de Rapin, was executed in Toulouse after a brief trial on 13 April 1568. He had been delegated by the prince de Condé to see to the disarmament of the Protestant held places around Toulouse. However, he had been arrested in Grenade after which he was promptly transferred to Toulouse due to his outstanding conviction from the first civil war for his involvement in the attempted Protestant coup of 1562 in Toulouse.

In response to Rapin's execution, Protestants of Montauban and Grenade conducted pillaging around their cities. The city of Castres refused to allow the baron d'Ambres, royal governor of the city, within their walls.

=== Comtat Venaissin ===
The conclusion of the war in France did not bring peace to Avignon or the Comtat Venaissin. The leader of the Protestant defence of Mornas, a certain Roland Robert, was taken to Avignon and strangled then burned. The affording of a strangulation prior to the burning was due to his abjuration from Protestantism. A painter from Avignon suffered the same fate.

The Papal government moved to proceed with the confiscation of Protestant property. Even if this property would have been inherited by a Catholic family member, the Pope advised that this inheritance should not go forward. In the Pope's view, an example had to be made to caution others against turning to heresy. Instead, the assets would be devoted to the restoration of churches and public places destroyed by the Protestants, with the left-over money being put to public expenses. The cardinal de Bourbon ordered that the Jesuits receive 1,200 livres from confiscated Protestant property.

The Protestant minister of Courthézon was seized by the Catholics and died at the stake. Catholics assumed control of the consulate of Courthézon, with the Protestants banished from the territory.

The principality of Orange was assigned a Catholic governor by Charles and had to submit to this.

== Sources ==
- Babelon, Jean-Pierre (2009). Henri IV. Fayard.
- Baumgartner, Frederic (1986). Change and Continuity in the French Episcopate: The Bishops and the Wars of Religion 1547-1610.
- Boltanski, Ariane (2006). Les ducs de Nevers et l'État royal: genèse d'un compromis (ca 1550 - ca 1600). Librairie Droz.
- Boucher, Jacqueline (2023). "Le Cardinal de Lorraine, Premier Ministre de Fait ou d'Ambition (1559 – 1574)". In Bellenger, Yvonne (ed.). Le Mécénat et l'Influence des Guises. Classiques Garnier.
- Brunet, Serge (2017). «De l'Espagnol dedans le Ventre!»: Les Catholiques du Sud-Ouest de La France face à La Réforme (vers 1540–1589) Tome 1. Honoré Champion.
- Carpi, Olivia (2005). Une République Imaginaire: Amiens pendant les Troubles de Religion (1559-1597). Belin.
- Carpi, Olivia (2012). Les Guerres de Religion (1559-1598): Un Conflit Franco-Français. Ellipses.
- Carroll, Stuart (2011). Martyrs and Murderers: The Guise Family and the Making of Europe. Oxford University Press.
- Carroll, Stuart (2013). "'Nager entre deux eaux': The Princes and the Ambiguities of French Protestantism". Sixteenth Century Journal. 44 4.
- Champion, Pierre (1937). Catherine de Médicis présente à Charles IX son Royaume (1564-1566). Grasset.
- Champion, Pierre (1938). Paris sous les Derniers Valois - Paris au Temps des Guerres de Religion:Fin du Règne de Henri II, Régence de Catherine de Médicis, Charles IX. Calmann-Lévy.
- Champion, Pierre (1939). Charles IX: La France et le Controle de l'Espagne (Tome 1). Grasset.
- Champion, Pierre (1941). La Jeunesse de Henri III (1551 – 1571). Grasset.
- Chevallier, Pierre (1985). Henri III: Roi Shakespearien. Fayard.
- Cloulas, Ivan (1979). Catherine de Médicis. Fayard.
- Cocula, Anne-Marie (1992). "Brantôme ou La Mauvaise Réputation du Duc d'Anjou, Futur Henri III". In Sauzet, Robert (ed.). Henri III et son Temps. Librairie Philosophique J.Vrin.
- Constant, Jean-Marie (1984). Les Guise. Hachette.
- Constant, Jean-Marie (1996). La Ligue. Fayard.
- Constant, Jean-Marie (1999). "The Protestant Nobility in France during the Wars of Religion: A Leaven of Innovation in a Traditional World". In Benedict, Philip; Marnef, Guido; Nierop, Henk van; Venard, Marc (eds.). Reformation, Revolt and Civil War in France and the Netherlands 1555-1585. Royal Netherlands Academy of Arts and Sciences.
- Crété, Liliane (1985). Coligny. Fayard.
- Crouzet, Denis (1999). "Calvinism and the Users of the Political and the Religious (France, ca. 1560-ca. 1572)". In Benedict, Philip; Marnef, Guido; Nierop, Henk van; Venard, Marc (eds.). Reformation, Revolt and Civil War in France and the Netherlands 1555-1585. Royal Netherlands Academy of Arts and Sciences.
- Daussy, Hugues (2015). Le Parti Huguenot: Chronique d'une Désillusion (1557-1572). Droz.
- Daussy, Hugues (2022). "D'une Diplomatie Rebelle à une Diplomatie Royale: Les Balbutiements de la Politique Internationale Huguenote pendant les Premières Guerres Civiles". In Gellard, Matthieu; Micallef, Fabrice (eds.). Diplomaties Rebelles: Huguenots, Malcontents et Ligueurs sur la Scène Internationale (1562–1629). Presses Universitaires de Rennes.
- Daussy, Hugues (2023a). "La Strategie Européenne du Parti Huguenot". In Le Roux, Nicolas (ed.). Les Guerres de Religion: Une Histoire de l'Europe au XVIe Siècle. Passés Composés.
- Daussy, Hugues (2024). "Les Assemblées et le Système Politique Huguenot (1562-1598)". In Charere, Philippe; Daussy, Hugues (eds.). La France Huguenote: Histoire Institutionnelle d'une Minorité Religieuse (XVIe-XVIIIe Siècle). Presses Universitaires de Rennes.
- Decrue, Francis (1889). Anne, Duc de Montmorency: Connétable et Pair de France sous les Rois Henri II, François II et Charles IX. E. Plon, Nourrit et Cie.
- Diefendorf, Barbara (1985). "Prologue to a Massacre: Popular Unrest in Paris 1555-1572". The American Historical Review. 90 5.
- Diefendorf, Barbara (1991). Beneath the Cross: Catholics and Huguenots in Sixteenth Century Paris. Oxford University Press.
- François, Michel (1959). Lettres de Henri III, Roi de France: Tome I (1557 - Août 1574). Société de l'Histoire de France.
- Garrisson-Estèbe, Janine (1980). Protestants du Midi 1559-1598. Privat.
- Garrisson, Janine (1991). Guerre Civile et Compromis 1559-1598. Éditions du Seuil.
- Gellard, Matthieu (2014). Une Reine Épistolaire: Lettres et Pouvoir au Temps de Catherine de Médicis. Classiques Garnier.
- Gould, Kevin (2016). Catholic Activism in South-West France 1540-1570. Routledge.
- Greengrass, Mark (1999). "Financing the Cause: Protestant Mobilization and Accountability in France (1562-1598)". In Benedict, Philip; Marnef, Guido; Nierop, Henk van; Venard, Marc (eds.). Reformation, Revolt and Civil War in France and the Netherlands 1555-1585. Royal Netherlands Academy of Arts and Sciences.
- Haan, Bertrand (2011). L'Amitié Entre Princes: Une Alliance Franco-Espagnole au Temps des Guerres de Religion (1560-1570). Presses Universitaires de France.
- Harding, Robert (1978). Anatomy of a Power Elite: the Provincial Governors in Early Modern France. Yale University Press.
- Holt, Mack (2005). The French Wars of Religion, 1562-1629. Cambridge University Press.
- Joblin, Alain (2023). Henri III: Un Roi de Tragédie. Ellipses.
- Jouanna, Arlette (1989). Le Devoir de révolte: La noblesse française et la gestation de l'Etat moderne 1559-1661. Fayard.
- Jouanna, Arlette (1998). "Le Temps des Guerres de Religion en France (1559-1598)". In Jouanna, Arlette; Boucher, Jacqueline; Biloghi, Dominique; Le Thiec, Guy (eds.). Histoire et Dictionnaire des Guerres de Religion.
- Jouanna, Arlette (2021). La France du XVIe Siècle 1483-1598. Presses Universitaires de France.
- Kingdon, Robert M. (1967). Geneva and the French Protestant Movement 1564-1572: A Contribution to the History of Congreationalism, Presbyterianism, and Calvinist Resistance Theory. Librairie Droz.
- Knecht, Robert (1996). The Rise and Fall of Renaissance France. Fontana Press.
- Knecht, Robert (2000). The French Civil Wars. Longman.
- Knecht, Robert (2014). Catherine de' Medici. Routledge.
- Knecht, Robert (2016). Hero or Tyrant? Henry III, King of France, 1574-1589. Routledge.
- Konnert, Mark (1997). Civic Agendas & Religious Passion: Châlons-sur-Marne during the French Wars of Religion 1560-1594. Sixteenth Century Journal Publishers Inc.
- Konnert, Mark (2006). Local Politics in the French Wars of Religion: The Towns of Champagne, the Duc de Guise and the Catholic League 1560-1595. Ashgate.
- Labourdette, Jean François (2013). Charles IX et la Puissance Espagnole: Diplomatie et Guerres Civiles (1563–1574). Honoré Champion.
- Labourdette, Jean François (2018). Charles IX, un Roi dans la Tourmente des Guerres Civiles (1560 – 1574). Honoré Champion.
- Le Roux, Nicolas (2000). La Faveur du Roi: Mignons et Courtisans au Temps des Derniers Valois. Champ Vallon.
- Le Roux, Nicolas (2013). Le Roi, La Cour, L'État de La Renaissance À L'Absolutisme. Champ Vallon.
- Le Roux, Nicolas (2022). 1559-1629 Les Guerres de Religion. Gallimard.
- Le Roux, Nicolas (2023). "Les Protestants, le Roi et la Ligue: Les Guerres de Religion dans la France du Nord". In Le Roux, Nicolas (ed.). Les Guerres de Religion: Une Histoire de l'Europe au XVIe Siècle. Passés Composés.
- Lhoumeau, Charles Sauzé de (1940). Un Fils Naturel de François Ier: Louis de Saint-Gelais, baron de la Mothe-Saint-Héray. Société Française d'Imprimerie et de Librairie.
- Marchand, Romain (2020). Henri de La Tour (1555 – 1623): Affirmation Politique, Service du Roi et Révolte. Classiques Garnier.
- Mariéjol, Jean H. (1983). La Réforme, la Ligue, l'Édit de Nantes. Tallandier.
- Micallef, Fabrice (2018). Le Bâtard Royal: Henri d'Angoulême dans l'Ombre des Valois (1551 – 1586). Droz.
- Michalewicz, Nathan (2020). Franco-Ottoman Diplomacy during the French Wars of Religion 1559-1610. George Mason University.
- Miquel, Pierre (1980). Les Guerres de Religion. Fayard.
- Neuschel, Kristen (1989). Word of Honor: Interpreting Noble Culture in Sixteenth-Century France. Cornell University Press.
- Pernot, Michel (1987). Les Guerres de Religion en France 1559-1598. Sedes.
- Pernot, Michel (2013). Henri III: Le Roi Décrié. Éditions de Fallois.
- Poinsignon, Maurice (1897). Histoire général de la Champagne et de la Brie : depuis les temps les plus reculés jusqu'à la division de la province en départements vol. 2. Martin Frères.
- Potter, David (1997). The French Wars of Religion: Selected Documents. Palgrave Macmillan.
- Potter, David (2021). The French Wars of Religion in France, 1559-1598: A History in Documents. unpublished.
- Renaudeau, Olivier (2023). "Armement et Tactique en Temps de Guerre Civile". Les Guerres de Religion 1559-1610: La Haine des Clans. In Fine Éditions d'art.
- Roelker, Nancy Lyman (1996). One King, One Faith: The Parlement of Paris and the Religious Reformation of the Sixteenth Century. University of California Press.
- Salmon, J.H.M. (1979). Society in Crisis: France in the Sixteenth Century. Metheun & Co.
- Shimizu, J. (1970). Conflict of Loyalties: Politics and Religion in the Career of Gaspard de Coligny, Admiral of France, 1519–1572. Geneva: Librairie Droz.
- Solnon, Jean-François (2001). Henri III: un désir de majesté. Librarie Académique Perrin.
- Souriac, Pierre-Jean (2008). Une Guerre Civile: Affrontements Religieux et Militaires dans Le Midi Toulousain (1562-1596). Champ Vallon.
- Sournia, Jean-Charles (1981). Blaise de Monluc: Soldat et Écrivain (1500-1577). Fayard.
- Sutherland, Nicola (1962). The French Secretaries of State in the Age of Catherine de Medici. The Athlone Press.
- Sutherland, Nicola (1973). The Massacre of St Bartholomew and the European Conflict 1559-1572. Macmillan.
- Sutherland, Nicola (1980). The Huguenot Struggle for Recognition. Yale University Press.
- Thompson, James (1909). The Wars of Religion in France 1559-1576: The Huguenots, Catherine de Medici and Philip II. Chicago University Press.
- Venard, Marc (1993). Réforme Protestante, Réforme Catholique dans la Province d'Avignon - XVIe Siècle -. Cerf.
- Venard, Marc (2023). "Le Cardinal de Lorraine dans l'Église de France (1564 – 1574)". In Bellenger, Yvonne (ed.). Le Mécénat et l'Influence des Guises. Classiques Garnier.
- Vester, Matthew (2012). Renaissance Dynasticism and Apanage Politics: Jacques de Savoie-Nemours 1531-1585. Truman State University Press.
- Vray, Nicole (1997). La Guerre des Religions dans la France de l'Ouest: Poitou-Aunis-Saintonge 1534-1610. Geste Éditions.
- Wanegffelen, Thierry (2005). Catherine de Médicis: Le Pouvoir au Fémenin. Payot & Rivages.
- Wood, James (2002). The Kings Army: Warfare, Soldiers and Society during the Wars of Religion in France, 1562-1576. Cambridge University Press.
