= Armed peace (French Wars of Religion) =

Peace between first and second French War of Religion

The Armed peace (or Long peace) was the period of peace between the first French War of Religion, which terminated in April 1563, and the outbreak of the second French War of Religion in September 1567. It would be the longest period of peace during the French Wars of Religion. King Charles IX and his mother, the regent Catherine de' Medici hoped to see the edict of Amboise which brought the first civil war to a close take hold in the kingdom. To this end, over the coming years, they would enforce its registration in the kingdom's Parlements (the eight highest courts of the kingdom, responsible also for registering royal edicts), establish a system of commissioners, and tour the kingdom. The edict, which afforded toleration to Protestantism, would be gradually curtailed in subsequent interpretative declarations, to the frustration of the Protestants.

At court, feud between the admiral de Coligny and the Lorraine-Guise dominated these years. At various occasions, the two sides made shows of force in entering into the capital, with a clash between the two sides transpiring in January 1565. The French crown attempted to suppress the quarrel, first by pausing any litigation on the matter for three years at the start of 1564 and then reconciling the two sides in 1566. This failed to bury the feud. Louis de Gonzague, and Jacques de Savoie were both beneficiaries of high-profile marriages during the peace. The former to the heiress Henriette de Clèves, who brough the Clèves-Nevers patrimony to the marriage, and the latter to Anne d'Este, widow of the late duc de Guise (duke of Guise). The balance of the court, under the auspices of Catherine, was predominately composed of moderate Catholics in this period.

From 1564 to 1566, Charles and Catherine toured the kingdom of France, visiting many cities to re-establish royal authority, and enforce the edict of Amboise. The tour proved the occasion for diplomatic meetings, most notably at Bayonne. During the period of peace, France's diplomatic relations would experience many crises, chief among which were the destruction of French Florida by the Spanish in late 1565, and the Spanish Netherlands crisis which began in 1566. This latter crisis would contribute to France's slide back into war in 1567.

France was saddled with many debts, legacies of both the Italian Wars and the recent civil war. During the peace, the crown looked to the church as an expedient to solve these troubles. Church lands were auctioned off in several stages. Other methods of raising loans and funds were also employed. Plague returned to France in 1564 and would cause much hardship. Similarly, the harvests were ruined by freak weather events from 1564 onwards, causing famine ad driving up prices.

== Edict of Amboise ==
The 19 March 1563 Edict of Amboise which brought the first French War of Religion to a close established religious coexistence for Protestants and Catholics in France. For contemporaries, it was not imagined to be the first of a long series of civil wars. Though it was sealed with yellow wax as an indicator of its provisional nature, it would outlast in duration the subsequent peace edicts of the civil wars that were intended to be final settlements. Most contemporaries did not see the peace as endorsing a permanent state of religious diversity in the kingdom. Religious unity would in time be re-established through mechanisms such as a church council or synod, and inter-faith discussions. The text of the treaty itself supported this notion of a temporary arrangement. The edict was stated to be provisional, pending a national or general church council (like that of the Council of Trent), and the majority (the age at which the king could rule without a regent) of the king, by which peace and tranquility might be established in France. Thus, king Charles IX of France was committed to the cause of religious reconciliation. The queen mother Catherine de' Medici, regent of France and mother to Charles IX, wrote to the bishop of Rennes on the subject in a letter of 20 April 1563, describing her hope to see the Christian schism healed in the coming years.

=== Catholic dissatisfaction ===
While the Catholic reaction to the edict was largely hostile, the priest and writer Claude Haton took a more nuanced view. The edict was frustrating to the Catholics in areas of their strength, but in areas of Catholic weakness in the kingdom, such as Languedoc and Poitou, it was a great salve. The historian Venard notes that the peace would presage a movement of Catholic reconquest. The Spanish ambassador to France, Chantonnay devoted himself to fretting that the plan of the peace was to host a new national church council, and that after the exiles had returned to their places of origins, votes would be held in the urban centres to determine whether they would be Protestant or Catholic places. He did not specify in his report whether this would mean the populace, aldermen, or councillors taking the vote.

=== Protestant dissatisfaction ===
The prince de Condé, leader of the Protestant rebel cause during the civil war who had negotiated the edict of Amboise with the crown, came in for much criticism from his coreligionists. The admiral de Coligny, who had been leading a successful campaign for the rebels in Normandy at the time of the negotiations felt that the terms agreed sold out the general Protestant population of France in favour of the Protestant nobility. He had only arrived back in Orléans after the signing of the treaty. Coligny came to Condé to argue that with their enemies, the maréchal (Marshal of France) de Saint-André and duc de Guise dead, they should have seized the military advantage this offered them. Condé, in contrast with Coligny, did not want to resume the fighting. The admiral denounced Condé as having destroyed more Protestant churches in France with the stroke of a pen, than all their enemies would have accomplished in ten years. Carroll argues that, by the concession of the edict to nobles with rights of high justice, that they could practice Protestantism on their lands, the crown augmented support for its policy of toleration among the princes. Their religious freedom was secured, and their religious power over their subjects increased. Even for the nobility, the limits on locations of Protestant worship were prohibitive.

John Calvin was particularly severe in his excoriation of the peace, seeing it as greatly disadvantageous to the cause of Protestantism in France. He described Condé as a 'wretch' who had allowed his own self opinion to lead to the betrayal of god. The Calvinist leader Theodore de Beza, who had been in France, gave a half-hearted thanks for the coming of peace, before quickly leaving for Geneva. In his opinion, Condé had blown a moment of great strength for the Protestant cause in France. The English ambassador reported that Calvin had harsh words for the Protestant military leadership. Condé, perhaps hoping to mollify him, sent a letter to the Genevan council full of praise for Beza's support during the conflict. The Protestant pastor Antoine de Chandieu noted that the church had been plunged into despair, and one could hear only lamentations and reproaches.

Condé, who had been the subject of celebration in Protestant literature until March 1563, now found his image negatively impacted. Rather than it being him who was eulogised in poetry as a Moses leading the chosen people out of Egypt, it was the admiral de Coligny who became the focus of Protestant enthusiasm. This latter figure having demonstrated dissatisfaction with the edict of Amboise. It was to the admiral de Coligny that Beza dedicated the preface of the posthumously published Commentary on Ezekiel by Calvin. Condé meanwhile was criticised. A rift opened between Condé and the Protestant clergy. Though the prince maintained a chaplain (known as La Rivière), this was a man who had always operated independently from Geneva and the synodal system. Even his relationship with La Rivière would be stressed over the coming years by his romantic philandering.

Condé was hopeful that, given a royal minority was still in effect, he might attain the office of lieutenant-general of the kingdom, an office that had been vacated after the death of his elder brother, the king of Navarre, in November 1562. With this office in hand, he would be able to assuage the doubts of his coreligionists about the peace he had negotiated. He would not receive this office. Around the end of May, it was rumoured that it was his refusal to lead the army that recaptured Le Havre from the English that cost him the office, but Daussy indicates that it was rather his refusal to convert to Catholicism. Knecht speculates that the need to deny him this office may have partly motivated the decision to declare the end of Charles minority early.

Such possibilities were not enough to reassure Coligny, and he arranged two meeting with the queen mother (and regent of France during the minority of her son), Catherine de' Medici in which he sought to attain some concessions relating to the peace. Firstly, he wanted the worship in the city of each bailliage (bailiwick) that the edict of Amboise had afforded to expand the right from the suburb of the city to the city proper. Secondly, he wanted Protestant worship to be permissible for nobles in the vicomté (viscounty) and prévôté (provostship) of Paris, where it was currently prohibited. Daussy notes the lack of record of these concessions being made, and thus determines that if Catherine did grant them, it was only orally. Coligny's frustration was somewhat appeased after these meetings.

== First months of peace ==
Per the terms of the peace, the Protestant mercenary reiters (a German pistol cavalry) had to be paid off and escorted out of the kingdom. This task was entrusted to the Protestant prince de Porcien by a letter of the prince de Condé's of 18 April, after word reached him that the reiters were pillaging the area around château de Fontainebleau. As no money was to be provided to the reiters until they were on German soil, this was a difficult and joyless prospect. Writing to Porcien on 12 May, Condé fretted that the treaty that had been established might break down due to the depredations of the reiters, thereby reigniting the civil war. He reported to Porcien that Catherine was frustrated by the slowness of the mercenaries' departure and would be writing to him separately. Porcien was to offer assurances to the mercenaries that they would indeed by paid once they were out of France, and that Condé would always be their champion. Writing again to Porcien a few weeks later, Condé explained the measures of reassurance Porcien was to offer the commander of the reiters, von Hesse. Porcien was also urged to come to court after he had completed the task, to help quell the political troubles that were brewing there. In a letter of 31 May to Porcien, Catherine reminded him that the service he was undertaking was of no small significance to the crown. Writing to Catherine that same day, Porcien complained that he had been unable to stop the reiters from undertaking foraging, as nothing had been supplied for them. He plead with Catherine not to hold this against him, arguing that the withdrawal was, foraging aside, proceeding more smoothly than it had been previously.

Through both May and June, Coligny and the seigneur d'Andelot gave their reassurances to Porcien. Porcien also solicited assurances of support from an aged gentleman, who affirmed that he had served Porcien's father, but could not serve Porcien due to his ill health.

Around the end of May, the prince de Porcien wrote concerned letters to Condé, Coligny, and d'Andelot, in which he expounded upon the rumours he had heard of 'enterprises' that were of threat to them. They were soon to be murdered by Catholic partisans as he understood it. Condé was entreated to surround himself with trusted associates and avoid participating in the recapture of Le Havre. Coligny and Andelot were asked to convince Condé of this danger. Condé would participate in the campaign against the English regardless.

=== Visit to the parlement ===
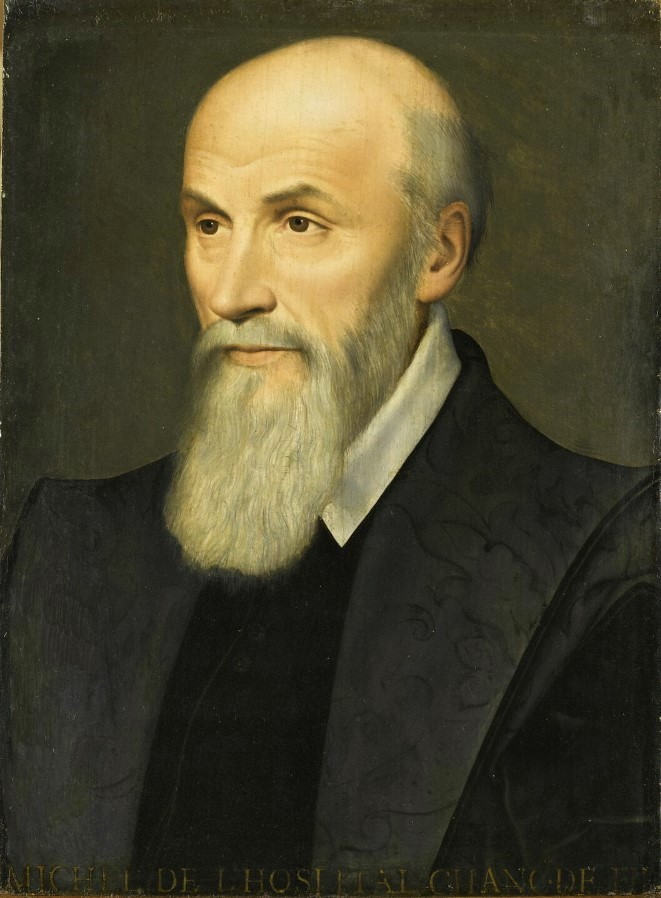
Michel de L'Hôpital, Chancellor of France and leading voice of religious toleration in the French royal council

King Charles visited the parlement (highest courts of appeal during the ancien regime, not legislative bodies) of Paris on 17 May, apologising for his prior failure to appear before the body on the grounds of his young age and devotion to other matters. The Chancellor Michel de L'Hôpital then made a request for the alienation of church property up to a value of 100,000 écus (crowns) in annual revenue. This would provide the funds required to see the English expelled from Le Havre. The premier président de Thou gave his voice to the chancellor's request and expressed his joy at seeing the king before them in the 'throne of his majesty'. He further gave his opinion on the rights of the parlement to serve as a consultative body for the king.

Chantonnay complained, in letter of 18 June 1563, that the prince de Condé was holding Protestant services in his residence at court. He bemoaned the lack of obedience in which king Charles was held that such a practice might be allowed to continue.

In June 1563, Condé made a move to strike against the house of Lorraine-Guise. He attempted to have the family banished from the court, which was then at the château de Vincennes. He was supported in this campaign by the constable de Montmorency, the duc de Bouillon, the duc de Nevers and the prince de La Roche-sur-Yon. Opposing this campaign were the Lorraine-Guise family themselves, the duc de Nemours, and the duc d'Étampes. This was despite the fact that Étampes had the reputation as a moderate Catholic.

In June, on the eve of the feast of Corpus Christi, Catherine and Charles stayed with Condé. This was hoped to be a sign of reconciliation. They travelled across the capital together without incident. However, the next day, a gang of armed Parisians stopped the princesse de Condé on her way to Vincennes, killing one of her attendants in the ensuing scuffle. Though his wife was unharmed, Condé was livid. He believed the affair to have been a Guise organised ambush and was only with great difficulty dissuaded from leaving court. Despite this, Catherine was able to boast a few days later that she had reconciled Condé with the duc de Nemours and the cardinal de Guise.

=== Peace with England ===
On 28 July 1563, Le Havre was recaptured from the English. The recapture of Le Havre began the process of peace negotiations with England. These talks took place, first at Gravelines, then Monceaux from 9 November, before moving to Paris on 15 November. In Paris, at the convent gardens of Bonhommes Catherine enjoyed a two-hour interview with the former English ambassador, and current French hostage, Throckmorton. She expressed her hopes to live in peace with England, noting that water neatly separated their kingdoms from one another. Throckmorton indicated a demand of 500,000 écus in return for peace and the release of the French hostages in England. Catherine rejected such a price for peace, noting that Elizabeth had lost Calais due to her own actions. The Spanish ambassador reported on another meeting at Bonhommes between Catherine and Throckmorton on the morning of 16 January 1564. After lunching, Catherine returned to the convent. To show her lack of interest in the English proposals, Catherine made plans to leave Paris. Throckmorton was then allowed to correspond with England, and to negotiate with the seigneur de Lanssac. In addition to Lanssac, the bishop of Limoges would also be involved in the French negotiations. New problems continually emerged in discussions relating to maritime affairs. Further, rumour swirled in late January that the French fleet was assembling at Bordeaux, and that the English had impounded French vessels. They would culminate in the 1564 treaty of Troyes.

=== Lit de justice in Rouen ===
A few weeks later, on 12 August 1563, king Charles IX made his Entry into Rouen. Both he, and his brother, the duc d'Orléans (future king Henri III), rode on horses dressed in gold.^{α} The Protestants of the city were excluded from the honour guard of Rouennais citizens who went out to greet the king. Thus, when a few days later the prince de Condé and cardinal de Châtillon arrived in the city, the Protestants sent out their own honour guard to greet their grandees. Charles was very impressed by the Catholicity of his greeting in Rouen, he thus gave assurances he would uphold the privileges the city enjoyed.

Six days later, on 18 August Charles held a lit de justice (bed of justice, a special session of the parlement over which the king presided). During a lit de justice the king represented a living embodiment of the law. It was breaking new constitutional ground to hold a lit de justice at a parlement other than that of Paris, this was intended as a humiliation of the latter parlement for its resistance to the policy of religious pacification. The parlement of Paris had protested rigorously on being informed of the intention to hold the lit de justice in Rouen. They refused to send delegates for the occasion and sought to convince Catherine to change course. De Thou argued that the king was in his majority from birth for the purpose of justice, so there was no need to host a special ceremony for it. If such an act was indeed necessary, the parlement of Paris was the most senior, and the seat of Charles' sovereign justice, thus a lit de justice could be held nowhere else. L'Hôpital would subsequently dismiss the seniority of the Paris parlement over the other courts of the kingdom, all parlements were equally subordinate to the king in his view. Such a position marked a reversal for the parlement of Paris, which had in prior decades argued that a lit de justice was an illegitimate institution in itself. This was not the only factor at play in the choice of Rouen, the court already being in Normandy for the recapture of Le Havre from the English. This humiliation compounded with the parlement of Paris' existing grievances concerning the pacification policy.

At this session, the majority of Charles IX was declared on the initiative of Catherine. This meant the end of the formal regency that Catherine had exercised for her son, though enjoying the confidence of her son, her powers remained as extensive as they had been in an unofficial capacity. Cosandey expounds upon this point. Through withdrawing from the regency, Catherine could afford her son more legitimacy, while continuing to govern in the name of a very young king on a de facto basis. Indeed, Charles declared in his short speech that his mother would continue to govern the kingdom in her new capacity as surintendante du royaume. Charles was thirteen years old. The old royal majority age of fourteen had been declared by ordinance of Charles V in 1374 (providing a far younger age than that of majority for private citizens which was twenty-five years old). On the death of Louis XI in 1483, his thirteen and two-month year old son Charles VIII was not declared an adult until he had reached the age of fourteen. Notably, this had been the occasion for competition over authority between Louis XII (then the duc d'Orléans), and the king's mother, Anne de Beaujeu. By means of this declaration of majority, Catherine hoped to provide her son with the authority required such that challenges to royal authority would wilt away. Rebellion against a king who had achieved his majority was a crime of lèse-majesté. Defiance of the edict of Amboise was to be considered lèse majesté. The king himself declared that those who going forward defied his authority would be treated as would a treasonous rebel. He left the door open to remonstrances (a mechanism by which the parlement could object to royal policy), but noted that after he had heard them, the remonstrator must obey his will.

The chancellor of France, L'Hôpital spoke. He praised the recent recapture of Le Havre from the English, noting that by their defiance, England had 'forfeited its rights to see the return of Calais to its control'. Calais was thus incorporated into the French kingdom. He extolled the province of Normandy for its venerable royal past. He justified the declaration of the king's majority at the age of thirteen, arguing that while traditionally royal majorities had been declared at fourteen years old, the king had entered his fourteenth year upon his thirteenth birthday. L'Hôpital therefore stated that it was not necessary for Charles to complete the year for the fourteenth-year to have been reached. The chancellor's reinterpretation of the 1374 ordinance that determined the age of majority would stick, becoming a 'fundamental law' of France from 1574. This was a necessary modification due to the troubles of the kingdom. The argument that the king never died was also affirmed, i.e. that the crown passed from one holder to the next instantaneously, without the need for a coronation or consecration to establish the successor as king. Through this affirmation, the hereditary nature of royal authority was strengthened, and the importance of the coronation diminished. Charles' role as the sole font of justice and absolute authority was spoken upon also. The parlementaires were cautioned against imagining they were in anyway sovereign as members of the sovereign courts. Their role was to interpret law, not to resist or challenge them. The chancellor analogised them to sailors, who, in thinking themselves sovereign legislators, defied their captain, and led the ship into ruin. It was their right to remonstrate with the king, but not to modify his law. Roelker summarises L'Hôpital's position as being that the king established the general laws (consulting the parlement if he so desired) and the parlement applied them in individual cases. L'Hôpital acknowledged their discontent at the fact their proceedings were leaked to the king, and while admitting this could be wrong in cases where the leak was motivated by ambition to achieve Charles' good graces, noted that the just official had nothing to fear in such revelations. In his opinion, the 'eye of justice' (like the king) saw all, and time revealed all. The chancellor opined that the administration of justice was the most important priority for the young King. He reprimanded the parlementaires on their application of justice, which they 'ill kept'. He noted their involvement in the cases of their friends and enemies, and desire to prosecute cases on the basis of who was the worthier litigant, rather than the merits of the case at hand.

On the subject of the edict of Amboise, L'Hôpital characterised it as not the product of the king alone, but also Catherine, and the princes and lords of the royal council. This served to counteract the registration of the edict of Amboise that the parlement of Paris had implemented on 27 March 1563. That parlement had registered the edict on a provisional basis until the king reached his majority. The king had now reached his majority, and affirmed the edict again. All parlements of the kingdom were ordered to immediately register Charles' declaration of majority, with the edict of Amboise rider provision. Following on from the terms of the edict itself, it was to remain in force until such time as a good church council might be held by which the people could be reunited. By merging the king's majority and the pacification edict, Christin suggests that the crown was looking to regain the initiative it had lost in recent years, reclaiming its position as the sole maintainer of peace and social order. Cloulas describes the integration of the edict of Amboise into Charles' declaration of majority as an 'audacious move' by Catherine.

The now adult Charles received homage at Rouen from all the present dignitaries, including his brother, the duc d'Orléans, who bowed and kissed his hand. Among those offering their obedience were the leading members of the house of Bourbon. The prince de Condé, his young nephew the prince de Béarn (future king Henri IV) and the prince de Dombes all came to kiss his hands. When Catherine went to pledge her submission, Charles left his throne, holding his cap in his hand, and assured her that her rule would continue.

=== Parlement of Paris curtailed ===
The parlement of Paris was ordered to register the edict the next day from the Rouen declaration. The body responded defiantly by refusing to register the king's majority. Intending to remonstrate with the king, the parlementaires were informed they would have to come to Normandy, and the location they would have the meeting was changed three times before it transpired. When the three Parisian parlementaires met with the king on 12 September (to remonstrate both about the Rouen declaration and the disarmament of Paris), they were surprised to find the Conseil du Roi (royal council) present for the occasion. Charles rebuked them saying that they imagined themselves to be his guardians, but they were in fact his servants, and should execute his commands. He noted that the ordinance he had issued was not his opinion alone, but also that of his mother Catherine. The parlementaires were there to implement justice not to govern as they had grown accustomed to thinking themselves able during Charles' minority. In cases where Charles' will was not clear, they might remonstrate, but on clarification, they were to obey.

Facing such rebuke, the parlementaires retreated into procedural obstruction. A tie vote (or partage) took place over whether to register this new edict of pacification without it being witnessed by two princes du sang (for surety that its approval did not indicate an approval of two religions). Those who voted for and against were recorded by name, and Charles demanded to see the lists. Disorder followed, with the parlement forced to admit the vote was invalid as it concerned a matter of state. The partage was expunged from the registers of the parlement. With the threat of their members being suspended, the Parisian parlement relented and registered the edict on 28 September.

While the court was in Rouen, a royal edict was promulgated on 16 August by which the king's subjects were ordered to surrender their weapons. Only cavalrymen of compagnies d'ordonnance (ordinance companies - heavy cavalry core of the royal army), archers of the prévôts (provosts), garrisons, guards and members of the king's household would be permitted to continue to bear firearms. Nobles could also enjoy the possession of firearms for their defence in their homes. By means of this edict, the crown hoped to regain its monopoly on violence that had been compromised by the preceding civil war. If it was not possible to temper religious passions from devolving into violence, the people could at least be denied the means by which they would indulge in the violence. Part of the infantry that had been previously raised was maintained, slotted into a corps known as the enseignes de la garde du roi (ensigns of the king's guard). By the same edict, leagues and secret associations were prohibited irrespective of social rank. Membership of such organisations was equated with rebellion.

Leaving Rouen on 19 August, the court toured Normandy (making entry into Caen around 23 August) and parts of the Île de France, before returning to Paris for 8 October.

The purpose of the royal return to the capital was to see the city calm and disarmed. Catherine also hoped to thank the Parisians for the loyalty they had shown her. This was complicated by the radical Catholicism in the city.

Around Christmas 1563, calls for the death of the queen mother Catherine were plastered up around Paris. Catherine laughed off the threat, noting that her enemies had once attacked her with cannons, and were now doing so only with their pens. On Christmas day itself, Catherine and the king attended Mass in one of the churches of Paris, and then Vespers at Notre Dame.

On the day of the feast of the Holy Innocents, 28 December, Charles went to the house of the admiral de Coligny to celebrate, accompanied by his mother. It was customary on this day to surprise one's friends in bed. The king hoped to enjoy himself in the company of the admiral, his brother the seigneur de Coligny. Catherine did not engage with the Châtillons.

In January 1564, Charles complained that in the provinces of Brittany, Picardy and Burgundy, Protestant services had not been established in the places allocated to them by the edict of Amboise. During the 1564-1566 tour of the kingdom, the administration of justice would be of great concern to the crown. This concern predated the departure however, with the king publishing an ordinance comprising 39 articles on the subject of justice and policing in the kingdom in January 1564.

Around this time, rumour swirled of a plan for the taking up of arms. The tangibility of these plans was confirmed by English records from March and April of that year.

The court made its departure from Paris on 24 January. That evening they arrived at the château de Saint-Maur. Close to Paris, and more pleasant than the other nearby royal residences, this place had been acquired by Catherine in 1563.

== Court ==
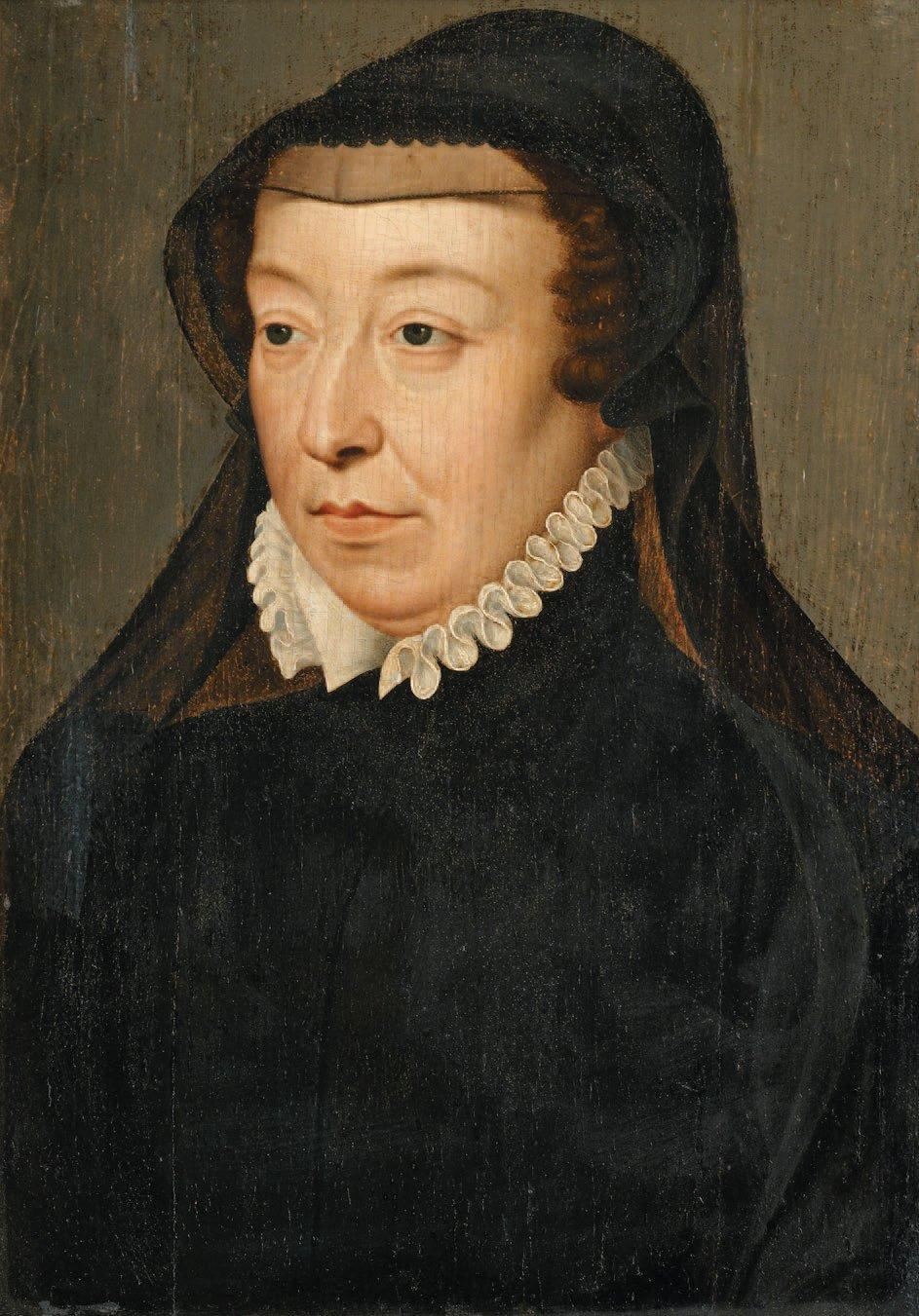
Catherine de' Medici, mother of king Charles IX of France and central to the government of France during this period

=== Membership ===
1563 represented a year of expansion for the royal council. The number of effective members was lifted from the thirty it had been in 1561 to forty-four. In the conseil des affaires (the inner council), the sword nobility (noble families whose nobility derived from their military service) maintained a majority presence, but they ceased to be a majority in the larger conseil privé (privy council). A new council was also established, the conseil des finances which was composed of the members of the conseil des affaires alongside the four secretaries of state, a secretary of finance, two intendantes des finance, and the treasurer of the treasury.

In February 1566, Charles curtailed the size of the conseil privé, removing over twenty persons from its rolls. Nicoll follows Valois' argument that this did not have much practical consequence, citing the infrequent continued presence of the comte de Crussol, who had in theory been cut from the council.

The French secretaries of state were established as full members of the conseil des affaires by ordinances of 1561 and 1563. These secretaries handled the regular royal correspondence of both Charles and Catherine. This included their internal correspondence with potentates inside the kingdom, and that with the ambassadors abroad. Until 1567, the secretaries of state (whose expanding role came at the expense of the chancellor) were Jacques Bourdin, seigneur de Villeines (who died 6 July 1567); Claude de L'Aubespine, baron de Châteauneuf (who died 11 November 1567); Florimond II Robertet, seigneur de Fresne (who died 22 October 1567), and Florimond Robertet, seigneur d'Alluye. The seigneurs d'Alluye and Fresne were felt to be sympathetic to the house of Lorraine-Guise, though ultimately Salmon concludes their primary vector of loyalty was to the crown.

In this period, the power of the queen mother Catherine was paramount. The Venetian ambassador opined that between the first and second civil wars (1563-1567) Catherine ruled the kingdom as were she its king. Her letters to the various governors of the kingdom, as to the ambassadors, would enjoy governmental power, and be the basis upon which these officials executed policy, or at least, the policy they were intended to execute. During the period of regency for Charles IX (which terminated in August 1563), Catherine's letter writing was at its peak. In the following years, her correspondence would continue at a reduced level. On average, she sent a letter out to the four corners of the kingdom every two days as part of a highly epistolary government. She was present at the royal council and took receipt of the diplomatic despatches. By the regulation of 23 October 1563, she was to be the one to open the letters provided by the secretaries of state. Further, before the king put his name to any document in the morning conseil des affaires it would be seen and heard by Catherine.

=== Religious makeup ===
In the royal council, the historian Constant delineates several discreet factions. Firstly, the zealous Catholics, numbering sixteen men, among whom: the cardinal de Lorraine, brother of the deceased duc de Guise; the cardinal de Guise another brother of the late duc; the duc de Montpensier a prince du sang (prince of the royal blood, patrilineal descendant of the French royal line) of the house of Bourbon-Montpensier; the duc de Nevers of the Italian house of Gonzaga; the seigneur de Tavannes, lieutenant-general of the province of Burgundy; and René de Birague, lieutenant-general of the province of the Lyonnais and future chancellor of France. On the other end of the scales were to be found the six Protestants of the council: the prince de Condé a prince du sang of the house of Bourbon-Vendôme; the seigneur de Coligny, nephew of the constable de Montmorency and Admiral of France; the cardinal de Châtillon, brother of Coligny; the seigneur d'Andelot, colonel-general of the French infantry, and brother of Coligny; the prince de Marcillac of the house of La Rochefoucauld; and the seigneur d'Estrées, grand-master of the artillery. Between these two camps was the largest of the three, the moderates who adhered to the policy of the queen mother Catherine. Chief among these figures was L'Hôpital, chancellor of France; the seigneur de Gonnor surintendant des finances (superintendent of the kingdom's finances, office established in 1564) and from 4 April 1567 maréchal of France as maréchal de Cossé; Morvillier, bishop of Orléans and future garde des sceaux (keeper of the seals, de facto Chancellor of France); and Monluc, bishop of Valence and diplomat. The moderate camp enjoyed sufficient numbers to always be in the majority during deliberations. The Constable de France, Montmorency though desirous of a singular religion in France had resigned himself to following Catherine's policy of religious moderation. Much to the vexation of the Spanish ambassador, Protestant and Catholic nobles fraternised at court from 1563.

There were also new councillors who irrespective of their religious preferences owed their position to Catherine's patronage, such as the baron de Retz and the seigneur de Lanssac. The former of these had his territories elevated to a comté in 1565, and in 1567 became the premier gentilhomme de la chambre du roi (first gentleman of the king's chamber) granting him privileged access to the king. From a modest background, his elevation was the cause of scandal.

Looking at the Protestant presence on the royal council from October 1563 to September 1567 statistically, Daussy identifies fifty-seven regular councillors that composed the body at least some of the time (for the two-hundred-and-thirty-five sittings we have record of). Of these, seven were declared Protestants. The cardinal de Châtillon logged eighty attendances, making him the most frequent Protestant presence. He was followed by the seigneur d'Andelot with sixty-one appearances, then the admiral de Coligny with forty-one. The prince de Condé managed thirty-five, the comte de La Rochefoucauld twenty-two, the duc de Longueville twenty, and finally the seigneur d'Estrées with eleven. The cardinal de Châtillon would enjoy the presidency of the council from September to November 1563 in the absence of the cardinal de Bourbon. Daussy highlights the restricted involvement of Condé in council despite his efforts to be present at court. He notes that part of the explanation of this is to be found in the fact the court was peripatetic for two years of the period.

Carroll states that the duc de Longueville had abjured from Protestantism prior to July 1563. In this month, he was married to the Catholic duchesse d'Estouteville. This match was a reward for his loyalty from the Lorraine-Guise family, who were first cousins of the Guise brothers. Through the match they hoped to reopen lines of contact with the prince de Condé, rekindling the Bourbon-Vendôme Lorraine-Guise connection.

The ardent Catholics of the council proved more scrupulous attenders of sessions, even if the Lorraine-Guise family was as ephemeral as that of the Coligny-Châtillon during this period (with the cardinal de Guise recording ninety attendances, the cardinal de Lorraine twenty-four and the duc d'Aumale twenty).

Nevertheless, it would be the moderates around Catherine that dominated turnout. This included the chancellor L'Hôpital who was recorded as having attended one-hundred-and-ninety-six of the council sessions, the bishop of Orléans who attended one-hundred-and-seventy-six and the cardinal de Bourbon who attended one-hundred-and-fifty-one.

=== Condé's personal life ===
Though Protestant, Condé's affairs at court, in particular his liaisons with a certain dame de Limeuil, a maid of honour to the queen mother Catherine, brought him in for rebuke from the leading Protestant theologians including John Calvin. By letter of 13 September 1563, they charged that his conduct was unbecoming of a moral Protestant leader, noting his growing reputation for amorous connections. Calvin wrote to Condé, noting that his reputation for philandering had reached Geneva. Those of good morals would surely be offended by this, and those of cunning would use it to ruin him. In addition to this affair, Condé dallied with the widow of the maréchal de Saint-André, Marguerite de Lustrac. Though prone to philandering, when he received word that his wife, Éléonore de Roye, was on her deathbed, Condé hurried from the court to be at her side. She forgave Condé for his adultery and urged him to hold fast in his Protestantism. The death of the princesse de Condé severed the link between the prince and the house of Montmorency. Decrue sees an immediate rupture in relations following her death. At this time, Condé wrote to de Beza to apologise for his past adultery. Nevertheless, when his son by the dame de Limeuil was born, shortly after the court departed from Bar-le-Duc in 1564, Condé recognised the child, to much scandal. Catherine had the dame de Limeuil put under arrest. After a brief captivity, she was kidnapped by four horsemen in the service of the prince de Condé.

Condé enjoyed the company of the Catholic duc de Nemours, playing tennis with him and swore to always be his friend, without either troubling the other over their religious consciences. Without request to do so, Condé ceased the conduct of Protestant preaching in the royal residences around the time of his affair with the dame de Limeuil. Beza greatly feared he would follow the path of his elder brother, abandoning Protestantism in return for power. In addition to these various personal offences, he had sold out the Protestant cause by the terms of the peace he had made with the crown in 1563. Yet Condé would remain loyal to the Protestant religion, and even a gift of 150,000 livres from Charles in January 1564 did not pull him towards adopting Catholicism.

While the admiral de Coligny hoped to see Condé re-married to the daughter of the German Count Palatine, Catherine and the Lorraine-Guise family saw alternative matches for him. The former looked to the widow of the duc de Guise, Anne d'Este, meanwhile the latter looked to a niece of the cardinal de Lorraine (such as a daughter of the late duc de Guise). At stake in these competing proposals, Condé's religious affiliation. In August 1564, the prince de Condé met with the cardinal de Lorraine in Soissons. This was to the alarm of the Montmorency family, the threat being a uniting of the factions of court against them. To the great relief of the Coligny-Châtillon, the prince de Condé would, in 1565, marry the Protestant Françoise d'Orléans. The marriage was celebrated at the court. His new marriage revitalised his commitment to the Protestant cause. Françoise d'Orléans was the sister of the duc de Longueville, and thus indirectly connected to the Lorraine-Guise, so Carroll makes the case that the match strengthened the bonds between Condé and the Lorraine-Guise, even across the religious frontier.

Condé was frustrated in his desire to see his son, Henri de Bourbon married to the wealthy heiress daughter of the maréchal de Saint-André, Catherine d'Albon. The queen mother Catherine forbade the match.

In addition to the prospect of the Condé match for Anne, the Lorraine-Guise family also looked to see the duc de Guise wedded to Renata, daughter of the dowager duchesse de Lorraine. This match was twice proposed to the duchesse, but twice refused, noting the young age of the duc de Guise. At a later date, returning from his crusade in Hungary, the young duc de Guise stopped over at the Bavarian court where he was well received. On 16 December 1566, the cardinal de Lorraine entreated the duke of Ferrara to see to negotiations that would have his young nephew married to a Bavarian princess. By February 1567, it had become clear to the cardinal de Lorraine that the duke of Bavaria felt little haste to marry off his daughters.

=== Other Protestants at court ===
The English decried the abuses the Protestant Coligny and Andelot were subject to, the Spanish ambassador meanwhile bemoaned that the French court was entirely Protestant. The papal nuncio, Prospero Santacroce, urged Catherine send Coligny and d'Andelot away from the court. Catherine retorted that it was more prudent to keep them there, as if they were instead on their estates, they would be plotting and holding assemblies.

In the lands of the admiral de Coligny, Crété describes an open religious pluralism at this time, in which alongside Protestantism, Catholicism was protected, even to the point of Coligny ruling against his own vassals, when they had been unjust towards Catholics. Indeed, Coligny would later boast before the Paris parlement that no place in France were Catholic priests safer than in his domains.

The duchess of Ferrara, Renée, daughter of king Louis XII was forbidden from conducting Protestant preaching at the royal château de Fontainebleau and her residence there. She complained of this in a letter to John Calvin of 21 March 1564. Renée found herself in conflict with some coreligionists, and Genevan pastors, on account of their insistence that she condemn Catholics. She granted that her recently deceased son-in-law, the duc de Guise, had persecuted Protestants, but she argued he had repented on his deathbed. She also objected to the idea that lying could be tolerated in furtherance of the Protestant faith.

The comte de Crussol, who had led the civil war for the Protestants in the south of France, returned to court in September 1563. He was formally rehabilitated the following month. Crussol arranged for a report of his actions to be drawn up before the conseil privé, something subsequently followed by a declaration of royal satisfaction in his wartime, and pre-war conduct. This included his conduct in Dauphiné, the Lyonnais and Languedoc during the civil war, as well as the mission he had undertaken prior to the civil war were validated by Charles as being done for the 'good of service' towards the crown. No further inquiry was permitted into his past conduct. He wrote to the French ambassador in Spain, the seigneur de Saint-Sulpice of his welcome, as he assumed the role of chevalier d'honneur (knight of honour) to Catherine that he had held before the war. Where he had once presented himself a Protestant, he now gave the impression of a Catholic, as a show of his loyalty to the crown. Through the nuncio (Papal representative in France) Santa Croce he reached out to pope Pius IV to achieve a rehabilitation of his image in the latter's eyes. From court, he maintained connections Saint-Sulpice and the baron de Gordes, receiving information from them, and alerting them to developments at the centre of royal power from his position on the conseil privé.

=== Jacques de Savoie and the Anne d'Este match ===
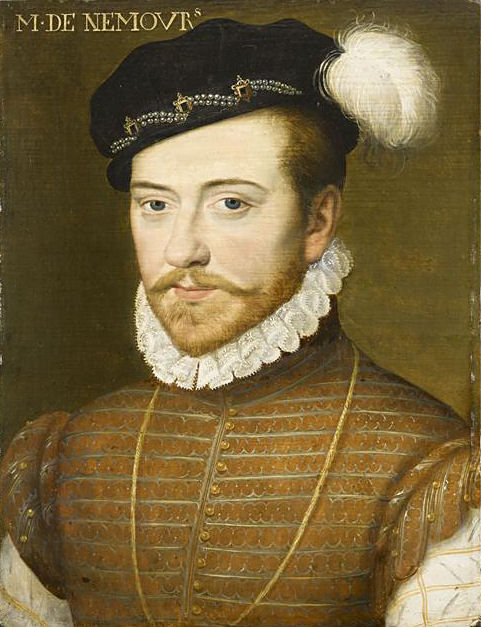
Jacques de Savoie, Duke of Nemours

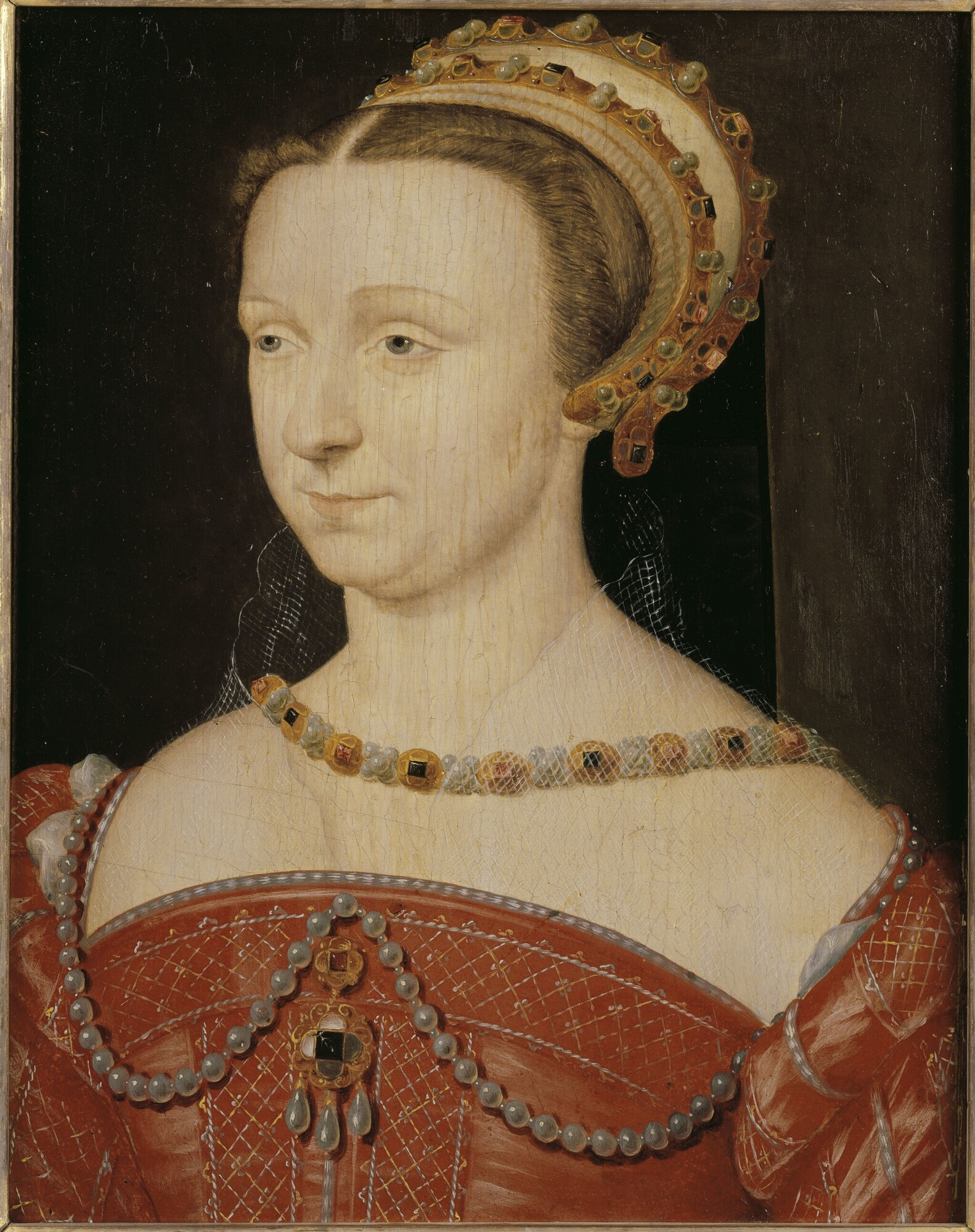
Anne d'Este, widow of the duc de Guise who would remarry to the duc de Nemours in 1566

Jacques de Savoie, the duc de Nemours' religious inclinations were not clear to contemporaries. The seigneur de Mauvissière] counted Nemours among the friends of the Protestant cause. Catherine by contrast saw in him a firm Catholic. Historians have typically understood Nemours as a client of the house of Lorraine-Guise (and thus ultra-Catholic), but the historian Vester pushes back on this, arguing that his affinity was more precisely for the Lorraine family proper. He notes that Nemours' sister, Jeanne de Savoie married into the ducal Lorraine house. Further, part of what drew him together with the Lorraine-Guise was the influence the ducs de Guise had over his territories in the Genevois in their capacity as governors of jointly Dauphiné and Savoy before 1559 (at which time Savoy was lost to France). For Vester then, Nemours was not a simple orbiter of the house, and he argues further that association with the Lorraine-Guise did not necessarily correlate with ultra-Catholicism in the 1560s. To support this, Vester gives examples relating to Nemours' conduct into the late 1560s.

His would be wife, Anne d'Este (who had been widowed by the death of the duc de Guise in 1563) meanwhile, while playing a key role in the intrigues against the admiral de Coligny, would go on to proffer shelter to the Protestant architect Jacques Androuet du Cerceau. According to Carroll, she was raised a Protestant. The queen mother saw her as vulnerable to the influences of Protestantism.

Through a match between Nemours and Anne, Catherine hoped that the firm Catholicism of Nemours would lead Anne away from her Protestant sympathies. In the years after the death of her husband in 1563, rumours swirled of a secret affair between the duc de Nemours and Anne d'Este.

==== Rohan scandal ====
The duc de Nemours found himself in legal dispute with Françoise de Rohan concerning his right to marry Anne d'Este. Nemours had gotten Françoise de Rohan pregnant around 1556, and she subsequently gave birth to a bastard son of his named Henri de Savoie. He had also indicated that it was his intention to marry her before resolving to abandon her. This child was cared for in the queen of Navarre's household, to be raised a Protestant. Françoise was a first cousin of the queen of Navarre, and had been a member of her household. Jeanne's attorney had declared before royal council that Nemours deserved to have his head cut off.

Catherine did her best to support the duc de Nemours in his prosecution of this case. In November 1565 he received positive news that the archbishop of Lyon had ruled in his favour, thereby opening the way for him to marry Anne d'Este.

On 28 April 1566, the royal council affirmed the judgement of the archbishop of Lyon on the Rohan case against Françoise. The queen of Navarre threw herself into her cousin's cause, challenging the competence of all the members of the royal council with the exception of the immediate royal family. She disqualified them on grounds of being related to the Savoie-Nemours, partisans of the house of Bourbon, or in the service of the Lorraine-Guise. Jeanne demanded that the matter be handed over to the impartial justice of the parlement of Paris. The parlement would not seize the opportunity, as the case had been evoked from their cognisance up to the royal council.

The queen of Navarre's dogged pursuit of Françoise's case had the effect of damaging her relationship with the Protestant duchess of Ferrara, who was the mother of Anne d'Este. Through her, it damaged her relationship with the Lorraine-Guise family, who had previously focused their ire on the Coligny-Châtillon and the Montmorency.

==== Marriage ====
The contract of marriage was signed on 29 April 1566. It committed Charles to proffer 100,000 livres (pounds) to the dowry, payable over three years. Present for the occasion was the king and his mother, as well as three cardinals: de Bourbon, de Lorraine, and de Guise. The duke of Savoy agreed that if something should happen to Nemours, he would guarantee 25,000 livres to his cousin. Nemours promised that if he died without heirs, his lands would default to his new Lorraine-Guise stepsons. They would not co-own their various seigneuries (lordships) but hold them as individuals. The wedding itself was conducted on 5 May 1566. The ceremony was prepared for with secrecy, but at the moment that the cardinal de Lorraine was about to pronounce the sacramental words, an officer of the parlement stood up to object on behalf of Françoise de Rohan. This caused Lorraine to stumble, and a gasp to go out among the assembled, but he then continued on, and the ceremony was concluded.

The offending parlementaire was beaten up and imprisoned. It was alleged in an anonymous chronicle that the man was an agent of the queen of Navarre's. Before the royal council, Jeanne quarrelled with the seigneur de Lanssac who tried to police her tone on the matter of the Nemours marriage, informing him that he was a rude man for interfering in her discussions with Catherine, and that one day his tongue would land him in trouble for which he would need his sword. To Catherine she expressed shock that Lanssac was not punished for his impudence. Despite her Protestantism, Françoise, with Jeanne's encouragement, then went on to appeal her case to pope Pius V.

Shortly after their wedding, the new couple departed for Annecy, where they played host to Anne's son, the young duc de Guise, and the cardinal de Guise.

The queen of Navarre's relations with her coreligionist Renée, duchess of Ferrara, were greatly damaged by the Rohan quarrel. The Ferrarese ambassador reported on 2 June that the two exchanged bitter words on a meeting that the queen of Navarre undertook, because of some statements that Jeanne had made concerning Renée's daughter, Anne d'Este. Renée refused to be kissed by Jeanne, and the queen of Navarre stormed off to tell Catherine, but Catherine was only amused by the affair.

In January 1567, Nemours' maître d'hôtel made for Rome to attend to the continuing Rohan litigation, which had not been put to rest by the marriage. It would only be in 1571, that the pope rule on the matter of Françoise's litigation, deciding in favour of the duc de Nemours. Litigation between the duc de Nemours and Françoise would nevertheless still be ongoing in 1577.

=== Louis de Gonzague and the Clèves inheritance ===
The Clèves-Nevers holdings in the kingdom of France found themselves placed in many opportune locations. The duchy of the Nivernais was wedged between the two Lorraine-Guise powerbases of Champagne and Burgundy. Inside Champagne itself, the Clèves held important seigneuries. The family also held lands in Picardy and Normandy, provinces subject to the domination of the house of Bourbon. It was advantageous to the French crown to see these lands, divided but coherent, remain outside of the hands of the great families of the kingdom. Alongside the lands was the network of patronage. In the absence of the Clèves-Nevers family, there was a risk of the nobles in the network being poached by a grandee. Indeed, upon the death of François II de Clèves, the Lorraine-Guise family had assumed the charge of governor of Champagne, which had been held by the Clèves family since 1545. Though the crown would have desired to provide the charge to François II's brother Jacques de Clèves, to contain the power of the Lorraine-Guise in Champagne, it was not practical in the political moment to do so.

==== Louis de Gonzague ====
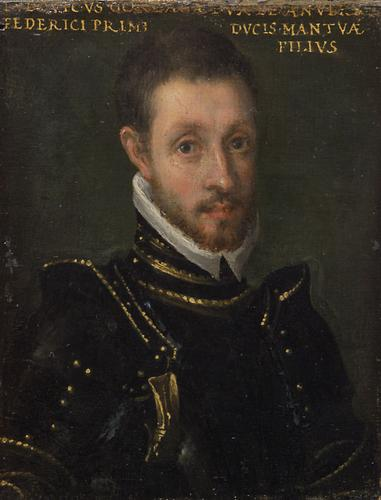
Louis de Gonzague, Italian noble who would be elevated to the title of duc de Nevers through his marriage to the heiress Henriette de Clèves

Louis de Gonzague (formerly Ludovico Gonzaga before his French naturalisation) enjoyed a prestigious lineage. He descended in the maternal line both from the French royal house (through his maternal grandmother Anne de Valois) and the Byzantine royal line (through his maternal grandfather, the marquis of Montferrat). He was also the brother of the duke of Mantua. This heritage was boasted by his French client Blaise de Vigenère. By means of emphasising this, Vigenère hoped to illustrate that his patron was not an upstart and that it was only natural for him to secure such a marriage as the Clèves match. Boltanski grants that his blood put him well above the other Italians who advanced through their association with the French court, but notes that without royal favour, he would have received no advancement.

Louis de Gonzague had been tied to the French monarchy since his transplant to the kingdom at the age of ten when he had been put into the service of the, then dauphin (heir to the French throne), Henri de Valois. Louis de Gonzague's family was intimately stitched into the upper rungs of the Catholic church hierarchy, with many relatives having served as cardinals. This gave a certain value to cultivating his favour for the French crown.

The duc de Nevers was a firm Catholic, and in the estimation of the historian Chevallier, prudent in outlook. His biographer, Boltanski, argues that initially the new duc de Nevers was a closely bound supporter of the royal party, whose benevolence he had enjoyed in the matter of his marriage, the protection of his finances, his elevation to the peerage and installation in the governments of French Piedmont (in April 1567) and the Nivernais (in 1569). He would maintain Italian clients there at the crown's expense. The appointment of Nevers as governor of the Piedmont scandalised the Protestants. By the showing of this favour, Charles and Catherine ensured that they had a grandee who was not inclined to take his own political positions. Though he would appear in royal council during this period, starting in 1566, he was not outspoken. In the 1570s and beyond, he would develop a reputation as an ultra-Catholic. In particular, the granting of the government of the French Italian possessions to the duc de Nevers, the crown looked to avail itself of his connections in the peninsula.

==== Evolution of the inheritance ====
At the point when Catherine initially began to work on the Louis de Gonzague - Henriette de Clèves match, she was not yet the prize heiress she would become. In 1563, while François II de Clèves, Henriette's elder brother, still lived, she was in line to bring only the Clèves Flemish lands, the seigneurie de Baye, and a sum of 30,000 livres to a marriage. The estates could then be redeemed by the family for a sum of 120,000 livres. This meant, that the match was only worth 150,000 livres, which was considered to be modest for the eldest daughter of such a great family. Around the same time, in early 1563, Louis de Gonzague's mother, Margaret Paleologa began to hurriedly offload as many of her lands that she held from her mother Anne de Valois who had died in 1562, to Louis. Thus, Louis acquired La Guerche, Pouancé, Château-Gontier, parts of the lands of Cani, Caniel and ^^Baugé$$. This was followed with the baronies of Châteauneuf and Thimerais, and the seigneuries de Senonches and Brezolles. Even with all of these lands under his belt, the disparity in title and land between Louis de Gonzague and his prospective bride at the time of their eventual marriage would be considerable.

With François II de Clèves' death and the succession of his younger brother Jacques de Clèves to the dignity of duc de Nevers, Henriette's inheritance grew. Those lands that had been allocated to Jacques while his elder brother lived were transferred to Henriette. With Henriette now an attractive prospect, the ball started rolling on the Louis de Gonzague - Henriette match towards the end of 1563. In October, pope Pius V gave the dispensation required for the marriage, as Henriette and Louis were related in the third degree.

His finances in poor condition, in part due to the ransom payment of 125,000 livres he owed for the battle of Saint-Quentin, and the money he had lost in the royal bankruptcy of 1557-8, Louis was forced to alienate La Guerche in June 1564. The crown was greatly concerned by his financial precarity and worked to patch up his finances to ensure he could be a marriageable prospect for Henriette. Across 1563 and 1564 he received almost 180,000 livres from the crown. A further 140,000 was promised for the occasion of his marriage and to pay off his ransom from 1557.

Catherine advanced the match further in a letter of 17 August 1564 when she undertook negotiations with Louis de Gonzague's brother, the duke of Mantua concerning the possible marriage. It was also explained to the duke of Mantua that the crown had intervened on Louis' side in a dispute over some Breton property he had with the comte de Brissac. She advertised the match favourably, noting that the duke could not imagine a better household for his brother, but that Catherine and Charles were interested in the opinion of the duke and his mother. Simultaneously to this, the crown intervened in the Alençon succession in a way favourable to Louis.

==== Extinction of the Clèves line ====
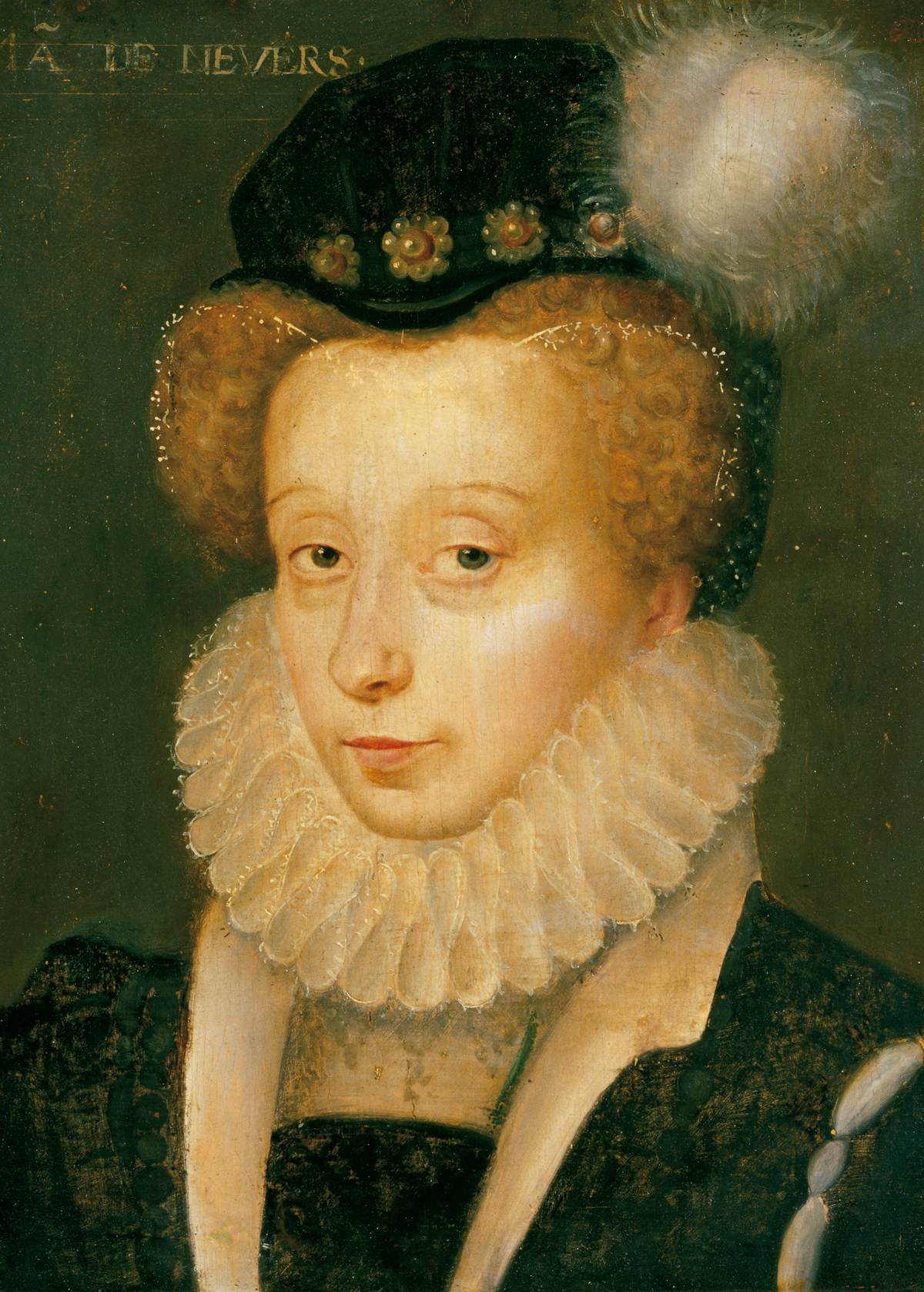
Henriette de Clèves, heiress to the duchés de Nevers and Rethel, who would marry in 1565 the Italian Louis de Gonzague

The line of Clèves-Nevers was mired in debts dating back to François I de Clèves who had died in 1562. On his death, the family owed 540,000 livres, with a further 31,600 livres in arrears for interest payments on rentes. Jacques de Clèves, duc de Nevers, was faced with the prospect of selling off family lands to raise 600,000 livres in revenues. There was the need of dowries for his sisters to consider, and that of his sister Henriette de Clèves which had previously been set at 210,000 livres had to be revised down to the comté de Beaufort which offered annual revenues of 10,570 livres. To protect her jewels from the family's creditors, they were hidden away at the house of a Parisian client.

On 6 September 1564, before the liquidation of the Clèves-Nevers lands could begin, the male line of the house of Nevers became extinct with the death of Jacques de Clèves. Thus, by the partage (inheritance plan) of 1560, Henriette found herself in line for the bulk of the Nevers inheritance. That she would maintain this inheritance was not a guarantee. Her younger sisters, Catherine and Marie contested the inheritance. Further there was the possibility that king Charles would abrogate the inheritance of one of the greatest fortunes in the kingdom and take the lands for himself. Ultimately, the crown would resolve not to usurp the territories, but rather to marry Henriette to Louis de Gonzague. The crown was grateful for the loyalty and valour in royal service the Clèves family had shown and therefore looked to protect the integrity of the Clèves-Nevers inheritance.

With the death of Jacques de Clèves in September 1564, Henriette's prospects as a match reached their apogee. By the terms of the 1560 partage, Henriette was in the absence of Jacques in line to enjoy the ducal-peerage of Nevers and Donziois, the comital-peerage of Eu, the county of Rethel, the barony of Rozoy, and the lands the Clèves held in sovereignty in Champagne beyond the Meuse such as the principality of Arches. This was contested by Henriette's sisters Catherine and Marie who argued that the partage contradicted with the customs of the places in which the lands resided and should therefore be considered null and void. The various claims of the sisters thus went to royal arbitration.

The partage between the Clèves sisters would be revised in 1564 and again in 1565. On both occasions this would involve Charles, Catherine, the prince de Condé, the cardinal de Bourbon. The duc de Montpensier being involved in the latter partage.

==== Advantages of Louis de Gonzague ====
To match for Henriette with the cadet of the house of Gonzaga was not a traditional choice. The Clèves family had previously enjoyed close marital connections with the house of La Marck and the house of Bourbon-Vendôme, and both had unmarried men to offer as suitors. In the former, the comte de Maulévrier, in the latter the prince de Condé (widowed by his wife's death in 1564) and his young son Henri de Bourbon. There was also the house of Lorraine-Guise, which had the young duc de Guise available as a prospect. Two of the constable de Montmorency's younger sons (the seigneur de Thoré and the seigneur de Damville) were also unmarried, but were of lesser stock. Most significantly, the house of Bourbon-Montpensier had several prospects, the duc de Montpensier himself (having been widowed) and his son, the prince dauphin d'Auvergne. With so many prospects available, the choice of the Italian, Louis de Gonzague, by the crown was not for want of a suitable bachelor.

On the subject of religion, with the Clèves family occupying an ambiguous position between Protestantism and Catholicism, the tying of Henriette to a firmly Catholic seigneur had advantages to the crown. Gonzague also offered the advantage of certain Italian territorial rights as a member of the house of Gonzaga, and would indeed pursue these, in relation to Montferrat, upon the death of his mother Margaret Paleologa in 1566. If a prince loyal to France was to hold such territories in northern Italy, this would be of great advantage to the French crown. Through the elevation of Louis de Gonzague, Catherine and Charles gained a powerful supporter who owed his position solely to the benevolence of the crown, where a man like the duc de Montpensier or the prince de Condé would not be so reliant on royal favour, at a time when the crown was looking to emancipate itself from the kingdom's factions.

Boltanski speculates that it may have been around this time that dispute arose between Henriette and Louis de Gonzague, with the latter chastising his prospective fiancée in a letter for her alleged religious unorthodoxy and her desire to break off the match. The death of the duc de Nevers also compounded the financial precarity of the house of Clèves: The creditors of the family taking the opportunity to go on the offensive.

==== Marriage ====
On the eve of the marriage between Henriette and Louis, the latter received a further mark of favour from the crown to ensure he had the proper dignity required for the marriage. His seigneuries of Senonches and Brezolles which were in the Perche, were erected into a principality. Thus, Louis de Gonzague because the prince de Mantoue without holding any Mantuan lands.

The articles, and various conditions of the marriage were agreed while the court was in Toulouse on 3 February 1565 during a session of the conseil privé over which the king presided. The existing lands of the couple was not merged and in the event of widowhood, the surviving spouse would maintain their own property and potentially take over the land held in common. The spouses debts would remain separate from one another. Descendants of the couple were to adopt the 'name, war cry and arms' of their mothers house. Notably absent for this session was the chancellor L'Hôpital. Aside from his absence it was well served for grandees on the occasion. This included representatives of the three great houses, that of Bourbon, Lorraine and Montmorency. Their presence served to indicate that even if they did not approve of the match they did not object to it. The articles from Toulouse were then confirmed before the couple in Paris on 2 March (with a certain Nicolas de Grunanville given power of attorney by the king for the occasion) before a sumptuous marriage on 4 March.

The marriage of Henriette and Louis, and the continued unity of the inheritance would serve to reassure the Clèves creditors.

==== Despoilment avoided ====
Another unusual aspect of the royal involvement in the succession of the Nevers patrimony concerned the approach to inheritance. The crown had been pursuing a policy, typified by the 1560 law of second marriages that prioritised the inheritance rights of the children of widows and descendants over the rights of their spouses to enjoy the inheritance. Simultaneously to this effort, the crown was looking to expand its domination over its assets and lands. This absolutist tendency in French policy of this period was led by chancellor L'Hôpital. Boltanski highlights that had such a policy been followed in the Nevers case, a partial despoilment of the Clèves-Nevers inheritance might have been anticipated, with the despoiled heiress being compensated financially on the occasion of her marriage with a large sum of money or annuity. Indeed, this had been the monarchies approach in the past, as with Henriette's father François I, who was despoiled of the county of Dreux in 1551. Nevers had been compensated for this despoilment with 3,000 livres in incomes.

Rather than pursue a centralising policy of despoilment, the crown favoured an alternate approach for the Clèves-Nevers inheritance. The large Nevers patrimony was brought closer to the monarchy not through direct control, but through provision of the territories to a figure fundamentally under the crown's influence. The supremacy of the monarchy was also asserted by the fact the resolution of the inheritance derived not from the chancellery of L'Hôpital, but rather from the royal council. The pursual of this line was pragmatic given the fragile state of the kingdom in the wake of the first French War of Religion. This was especially true with aristocratic jockeying for position continuing into the years of peace, as typified by the Châtillon-Guise feud. Though the approaches of the crown and the chancellor diverged from one another, they ultimately looked towards the same outcome of a strengthened crown, taking alternate routes to the destination.

==== Settlement ====
On 1 March 1566, the crown definitively determined the partage between Henriette, and her two sisters. By the terms, the essential majority of the Clèves-Nevers patrimony fell to Henriette, including several 'fiefs of dignity'. Charles also ensured that the peerage of the Nivernais would transmit to Henriette and thus to the new duc de Nevers. For the younger sisters, 700,000 livres worth of land, including the comté d'Eu. Charles emphasised that he had first established the continuity of the peerage of Nevers to Henriette in the wake of Jacques' death in September 1564. He justified it on the grounds the domains had been raised to the ducal-peerage initially in favour of a woman, i.e. Marie d'Albret. This was an act that could not be done by the king's will alone, and would require registration in the parlement, with the beneficiaries to be received by the body to take their oaths. However, the partage was significantly more generous to the younger sisters than that mandated by the agreement of 1560. Catherine received some of the lands from beyond the Meuse, as well as the comital peerage of Eu. For Marie, the marquisate of Isles, the county of Beaufort, the viscounty of Saint-Florentin and various other seigneuries. Henriette was also obliged to provide annual annuities of 28,000 livres to both of her younger sisters in return for their renunciation of their inheritance rights. In the letters patent, the duc de Nevers was referred to as being of the house of Clèves. The king made it clear his prime concern was to preserve the house of Nevers. On the matter of the debts of the house, Charles authorised an auction of lands up to the value of the debts without any legal complications. Boltanski sees in this a threading of the needle, while the crown looked to maintain the unity of the Clèves-Nevers patrimony, it was not disinterested in the prospect of the size of this patrimony weakening. In regards to responsibilities for the sums owed to the various widows of François I, François II and Jacques, totalling 34,000 livres annually, Henriette would be responsible for half, while Marie and Catherine would be responsible for the other half. Among those who bore witness to this partage were the Protestant queen of Navarre and the cardinal de Châtillon. The historian Descimon suspects, though cannot prove, that it was in reaction to this sweetheart arrangement that the chancellor L'Hôpital issued an edict in July 1566 by which fiefs of dignity (such as Nevers, Rethel and Eu) reverted to the crown on the extinction of the male line in which they were held, even if they had never previously been part of the royal domain.

There would be difficulty in registering the inheritance of the Clèves-Nevers peerages through the female line. It was opposed before the parlement by the duc de Montmorency. Montmorency argued that peerages were only transmissible through the male line, and thus the Nevers peerages had gone extinct with the death of Jacques de Clèves. Montmorency's opposition stretched back to a dispute he had partaken in with François I de Clèves over the relative precedence of the Montmorency and Nevers peerages. As a result of the opposition of Montmorency, the court delayed the reception of the new duc de Nevers, and comte d'Eu. Beyond this festering dispute the conflict reflected Montmorency's opposition to the arrival of Louis de Gonzague into the ranks of the French grandees. The king would settle the matter before the parlement on 21 June 1566 by ordering the parlement to receive Louis de Gonzague's oath. As such, the duc de Nevers was able to take his oath of peerage on 22 June 1566. The relative precedence of the Montmorency and Nevers peerages would not be settled by the king though. Indeed, the premier président (first president) of the parlement de Thou informed Nevers of this at the time of his undertaking the oath on 22 June.

Montmorency renewed his opposition on the matter on 27 December 1566. He stated that he had caused the king to declare that his intervention in the continuity of the Nevers peerage did not prejudice the rights and prerogatives of other peerage holders in the kingdom.

In 1566, the new duc de Nevers began the selling off of the Clèves-Nevers lands. That year, he sold off 642,000 livres worth of land, chiefly to old clients and associates of the Clèves-Nevers. Among the lands sold, the seigneuries d'Aspremont, Beu, Saint-Brisson, Aultry, Pierre-fittes-des-bois, Briaux, Ressons, Bonnicourt, and Meneslies.

==== Religious conference ====
In the hopes of convincing his daughter and son-in-law, the duchesse and duc de Bouillon to return to the Catholic fold, the duc de Montpensier organised a bi-confessional religious conference at the hôtel de Montpensier at the start of July 1566. Holding such a conference in the wake of the failed colloquy of Poissy and the Council of Trent which had calcified Catholic doctrine gave the conference a different air. Rather than a case of interfaith discussion of doctrine, something that was no longer realistic, the objective was to verbally fight for the religious allegiance of the Bouillon couple. Present for the occasion were many Catholic seigneurs, ladies, Catholic doctors from the college of Sorbonne, and Protestant ministers. A dispute arose between the doctors and ministers that was put before Charles and Catherine where it was debated before the Protestant admiral de Coligny and the Catholic duc de Nevers. As a result of this debate, it was agreed a private conference would be held at the hôtel de Nevers. For Nevers, hosting the event offered the possibility of being the patron of a prominent noble's conversion to Catholicism. This would be a smaller affair than prior interfaith discussions, with the duc de Nevers enjoying the role of president and arbiter. Alongside him would only be the duc and duchesse de Bourbon, two Catholic doctors and two Protestant ministers. For the Catholics: Claude de Sainctes and Simon Vigor, for the Protestants Jean de L'Espine and Hugues Sureau du Rosier (who had recently been imprisoned in the Bastille on charge that he wrote a seditious Protestant polemic). This was not to turn into a fight between the Protestant and Catholic representatives. This conference would extend from 9 July to 26 August and cover matters of dogma, the real presence, Mass, and the authority of the church in the interpretation of the scripture. Both the Catholic and Protestant representatives remained fixed in their positions, indeed they were to have announced at the start that they would not be swayed by the other creed. This represented a failure for the Catholics and the duc de Nevers, as the goal of the endeavour had been to rally the duc and duchesse de Bouillon to the Catholic faith, something that did not happen.

Boltanski argues that despite the intransigence of the Nevers conference, it likely indicated that the duc de Nevers still maintained the hope that Protestantism would peacefully reunify with the Catholic church. This period for the grandee would terminate with the second French War of Religion, which would forge him into a more stringent Catholic.

=== Feud ===
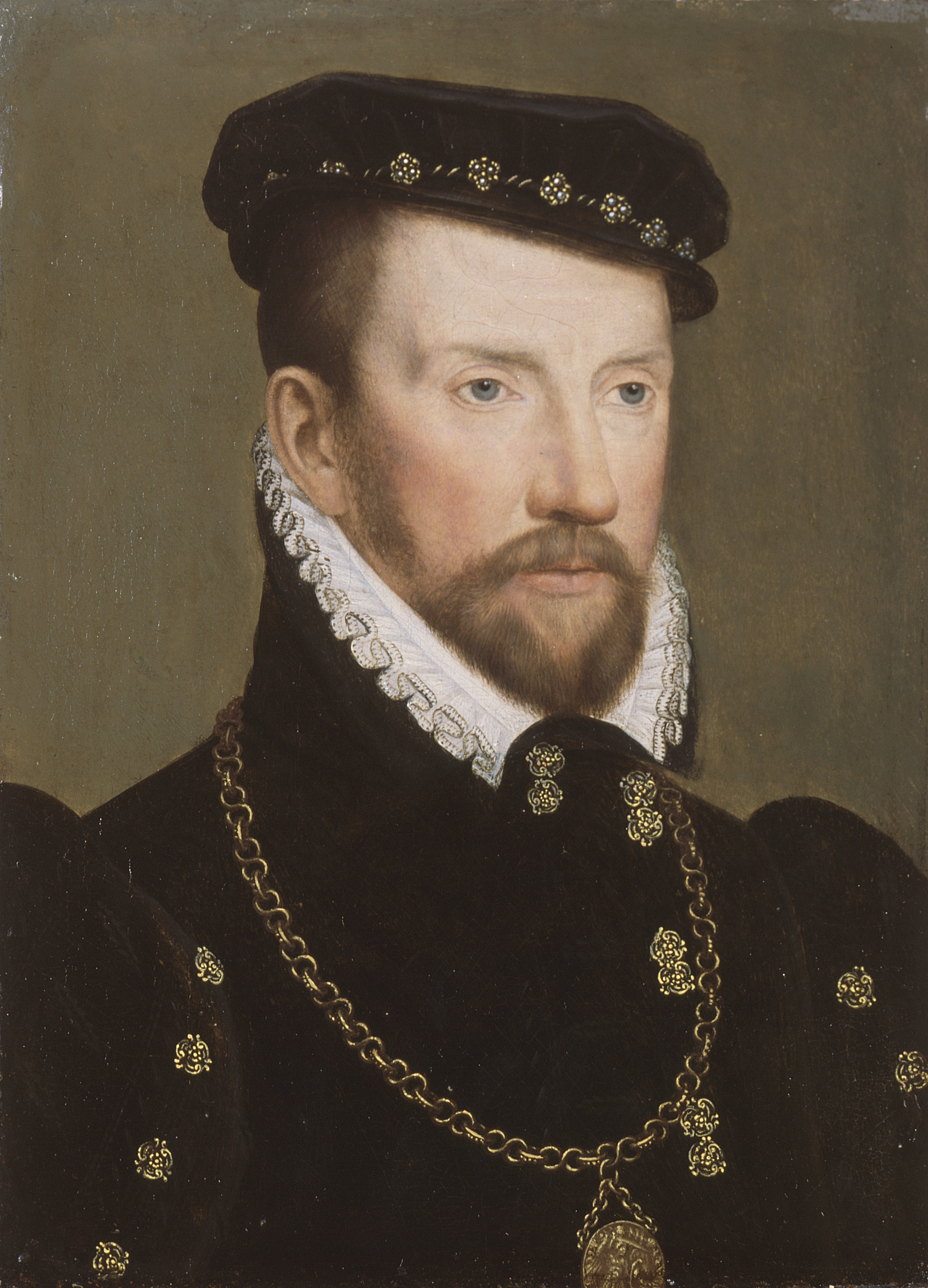
Admiral de Coligny, accused by the house of Lorraine-Guise of orchestrating the duc de Guise

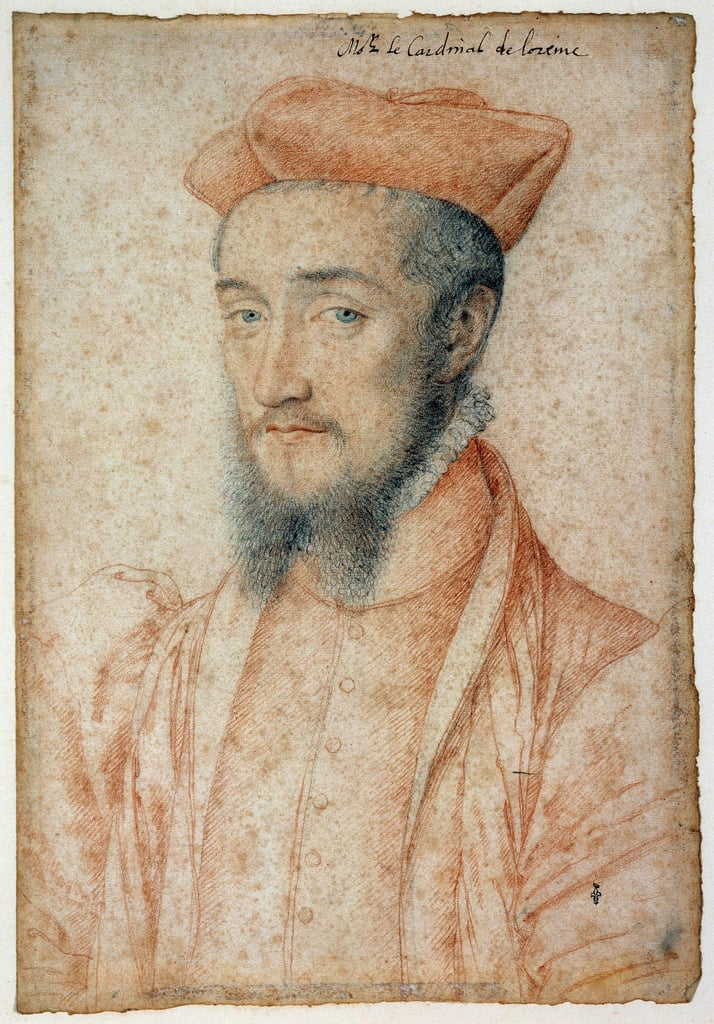
Cardinal de Lorraine, who, during the minority of the new duc de Guise led the campaign against the admiral de Coligny

==== Assassination ====
The Lorraine-Guise family held the admiral de Coligny responsible for the death of François de Lorraine, duc de Guise, who was assassinated at Orléans in February 1563. In their minds, it was he who arranged for the assassin, Jean de Poltrot de Méré to do the deed. Indeed, in his first interrogation, Coligny had been among those Méré accused of inspiring and financially supporting his perpetration of the act. In muddled further interrogations Méré would first recant the accusation against Coligny before accusing him again. Coligny had hotly denied Méré's charges, writing a point-by-point refutation of them, and demanding to be able to confront his accuser, something he would not be given a chance to do before Poltrot de Méré's execution.

In particular, François de Lorraine's young son Henri de Lorraine, duc de Guise entertained a passionate hatred for the Coligny-Châtillon brothers. Coligny had informed Catherine that while he had no part in the assassination, he did not regret that it had transpired considering it to be a 'great good' both for his family, and the kingdom at large. This glee at the death of the duc de Guise sharply contrasted with the duc de Guise's deathbed pardon of his assassin. The historian Daussy holds up the opinion of the contemporary Aubigné when he comes to his judgement. While Coligny may not have guided Méré's hand to undertake the act, he did nothing to dissuade him either. The historian Sutherland argues, citing the contemporary Pasquier, that for the Lorraine-Guise family, they did not seriously believe Coligny to be guilty, but wished to see him excluded from royal council and access to the sovereign. Further, by destroying him, they could destroy the peace they despised. For the historian Jouanna, ultimately the accusations against Coligny are unverifiable.

In Protestant circles, the assassin, Méré] would be celebrated for years for having killed the hated duc de Guise. They believed that through his sacrifice, he had saved 'thousands of lives'. On the anniversary of Guise's death each year, verses were made extolling the assassin. This was not an uncomplicated celebration, it was important to stress that he had acted alone and of his own volition as opposed to divine inspiration, when he did the deed. A Protestant discourse of 1564, analogised the deceased duc de Guise with Antiochus III the Great, who had died at the hands of a mob. For the author, both illustrated the fate of those princes who were unjust and ambitious. The 1566 play Aman, which recounted the Biblical story of Esther, was seen as analogising the death of its villain Haman, who threatens the Jews (here standing in for the Protestants), with the duc de Guise. This was despite the fact the play had originally been written in 1561.

==== Opening salvos ====
For the Lorraine-Guise family, the death of the duc de Guise represented a serious blow to the strength of their family in France. Over the next few years, it was to be followed by the death of two of his younger brothers: the Grand Prior of the Order of Malta, and the marquis d'Elbeuf (who had recently been established as commander of the Mediterranean galleys). Carroll argues that until the ascent of Henri III in 1574, the family was largely out of influence.

At the end of March, a family council of the Lorraine-Guise clan met at Joinville. The occasion was a bitter one, lacking the stoicism of the cardinal de Lorraine, who was then at the council of Trent. The late duc de Guise's widow, Anne d'Este, took the lead at the meeting. A plan was devised by which they would pressure the crown towards legal action against the admiral de Coligny with public armed demonstrations. To reduce the cover afforded to the admiral de Coligny by his Montmorency cousins, propaganda vilifying the family would be pumped out. The Montmorency family would respond in kind in the propaganda war, championing themselves as defenders of the monarchy and the peace.

In later Guisard libels of the propaganda war, appeals went out to the princes, and to Condé specifically, urging them to unite against those of inferior condition (i.e. the Montmorency's) who sought to outrank them. The Montmorency family were parvenus who overturned the social order and hierarchy. The Montmorency propagandists shot back that the cardinal de Lorraine was an incestual hypocrite, the antichrist, and that the Lorraine-Guise family fancied itself as the successors of the Angevin empire. They were in fact, the real parvenus, descending from the foreign comtes de Vaudémont.

Thus, at the terminus of March, the duc d'Aumale moved to see legal proceedings opened against Coligny in front of the parlement for the murder of his brother, the duc de Guise. Coligny protested in a memorandum to Catherine, in which he excoriated the duc de Guise as a brutal killer and noted that the assassin of the duc de Guise had declared him innocent of involvement in the murder before his execution.

On 26 April, the Lorraine-Guise initiated a private suite against the admiral de Coligny. This was accompanied with demonstrations in the capital.

The English agent, Smith, reported to the English statesmen, Cecil, on 3 May that Coligny required an escort of 500 to 1,000 gentleman for his safety at the French court. In a follow-up letter of 17 May, he clarified the source of the danger Coligny was under, as relating to the murder of the duc de Guise.

In a document dated 5 May, Coligny built upon his initial denial of involvement from 12 March, in addition to republishing that earlier work. This declaration was published in Orléans and then translated into German and Latin so that it might be distributed in the Holy Roman Empire. The translation was undertaken by a certain Georg Keller, who Theodore de Beza had reached out to through the Protestant reformer Heinrich Bullinger. By September, the German version could be seen in the Frankfurt fair.

==== Allies ====
On 11 May, Coligny and the seigneur d'Andelot, with several hundred horsemen, made for the French court. They were met on the road by the prince de Condé, who counselled Coligny in Catherine's name, to retire to his home. Coligny obeyed, leaving Condé and Andelot to defend him at court. This earned the admiral the rebuke of the Protestant theologian Theodore Beza, the historian Crété however sees little room for manoeuvre in the circumstances. Around this time, Coligny considered going into a form of exile by retiring to Coligny-le-Neuf between Burgundy and the Savoyard ruled comté de Bresse. Condé lived up to his promise to see to the defence of Coligny, presenting a declaration to the court on 15 May in the admiral's favour over the matter of the duc de Guise's murder. He was followed by the maréchal de Montmorency, son of the constable de Montmorency. The maréchal observed that as this was not a quarrel of religion or the crown, his father intended to support his nephew Coligny with all his power and influence. Indeed, in these years, the constable de Montmorency was firmly of an anti-Lorraine-Guise policy. He sent his secretary to the prince of Orange in the Netherlands to make clear his opposition to the designs of the cardinal de Lorraine. The younger Montmorency likewise, would devote himself to the cause of his cousin. The position of the maréchal de Montmorency towards Protestantism was of great anguish to the Spanish ambassador Álava. The Constable's younger son, the seigneur de Damville held less warmth for Coligny, he having enjoyed the exercise of Coligny's title of admiral during the recent civil war, a title he now lost with the restoration of the one-time rebel's honours.

By arrêt of 16 May, Charles evoked the matter of the duc de Guise's assassination to his personal attentions, forbidding either party in the quarrel (be they Lorraine-Guise or Coligny-Châtillon) to offend the other.

One of the Lorraine-Guise faithful, the comte de Lude, declared in August 1563 his loyalty to the duc de Guise, cardinal de Lorraine, and Anne d'Este. He stated he would avenge the murder of the late duc de Guise up to the fourth generation both for the guilty party itself and those who were sympathetic to the guilty party. He further declared he and his company would be ready to march if the call came. He was not the only supporter of the Lorraine-Guise to make such a pledge during August. A similar pledge was made by the seigneur de Sanssac who swore to either expel or kill those who had brought about a peace without justice, as well as to exterminate Protestantism. Carroll dismisses the importance of these pledges, arguing that they served more as indications of moral support for the Lorraine-Guise cause rather than practical offers. The comte de Lude's promise to avenge up to the fourth generation was a Biblical convention, and outside of the realm of rhetoric he would always remain a loyal servant of the crown.

With Coligny and the cardinal de Châtillon having absented themselves from court, they were urged to return by Calvin and Beza, who saw that they were leaving the field open for their adversaries. By letter of 5 August, they highlighted how they hoped the admiral de Coligny might return to the centre of royal power, so that things do not progress from bad to worse.

Around mid to late September, the Lorraine-Guise family went in force to Meulan, where Catherine was presently greatly ill after taking a fall from her horse. Sutherland points to rumours from the Coligny- Châtillon faction that, had Catherine died, they intended to seize the king, install him in Paris, and there oversee the execution of the Montmorency clan.

On 26 September, the Lorraine-Guise party made a great show of their mournful arrival at the court. This included the late ducs mother, Antoinette de Bourbon, and widow Anne d'Este alongside all the princes of the house of Lorraine. They begged at Charles' feet to be allowed to pursue justice against the admiral de Coligny. Anne d'Este, who prostrated herself before the king after Mass at the church of Meulan, moved the king to tears. The petition they presented, was signed by all members of the Lorraine-Guise family with the exception of the cardinal de Lorraine. Similarly, it contained signatures from the duc de Montpensier, the duc de Nemours, the cardinal de Bourbon and the duc de Longueville. On 30 September, Anne, the cardinal de Guise, the Ferrarese ambassador, and two hundred of their supporters gathered by Sainte-Chapelle. They proceeded into the parlement where they packed the chamber and over the objections of the attorney general secured the naming of commissioners to start the investigation by means of intimidation. The conseil privé assented to the opening of such a case. No sooner was this consent granted than the cardinal de Châtillon intervened to request that cognisance of the case be denied to the parlement of Paris, who had 'prejudiced themselves' by their hatred. This was then agreed to in turn, and the matter was referred to the grand conseil. Carroll credits this move to Charles, keen to defuse the heated situation. This was to the frustration of the Lorraine-Guise party, who pushed for other courts to take the case.

Both Montmorency and Catherine were little keen to see Coligny prosecuted, fearing the spectre of a resurgent Guise family. Charles was keen to get both sides to sign a pledge that they would not attempt to secure victory in their quarrel by extra-legal means, and that they would refrain from grand shows of military power by travelling only with the horsemen required for their typical train.

Such a pledge was unacceptable for the Coligny-Châtillon party. They entreated Charles in a remonstrance to disregard the slander raised against them. They desired to see a good peace, and it was the Guise who had seized upon the unreliable testimony of Poltrot de Méré to pursue a vendetta. It was noted that Coligny had retired to his estates, as had been requested (and advised for his safety by the prince de Condé who imagined he might be assassinated). The Guise by contrast, had come to court in a grand show of force. Coligny alleged, in a letter of 8 October to the king, that the Lorraine-Guise were prepared to pursue extrajudicial justice against him if they were denied it by the crown. Indeed, he spoke of several assassins who had been sent to kill him and were in the duc d'Aumale's service.

During October, each session of the parlement of Paris was invaded by crowds of Parisians.

That same month, the duc d'Aumale quarrelled with the constable de Montmorency. The constable de Montmorency issued a public challenge, accusing a servant of the duc d'Aumale's of having plotted to kill him. Aumale issued a counterchallenge, demanding satisfaction from Montmorency. He knew no duel could take place between men of unequal rank, but as long as his challenge remained active, it would impugn the constable de Montmorency's honour until a man of his accepted it. Aumale would end up departing the court long before his siblings.

==== Return of the admiral de Coligny ====
In November, Coligny made his way to return to the French court. This return was both necessitated by his conflict with the Guise and encouraged by the comte de La Rochefoucauld who warned him of the state of the court in his absence. No sooner was he on the road than Aumale announced his intention to come to court, with over 1,000 horse. Deeply concerned, Catherine bade Coligny return to his estates, fearing a reignition of the civil war. Coligny refused to back down, arguing to do so would impugn his honour. Instead, he proclaimed that going forward he would remain with the court, both to protect his reputation, and to better execute the charge of his office of admiral. He shadowed Charles and Catherine as they moved to the capital, arriving a day after on 20 November. His entry was surrounded by a host of nobles, both those who had joined him on the journey, and those who had come out from Paris to meet him. The Venetian ambassador put the numbers of his supporters for the entry between 8,000 and 10,000, and fretted that the smallest provocation might induce great troubles in such a climate. With his arrival, the Lorraine-Guise departed from the Louvre Palace and made for the hôtel de Guise (a hôtel in this context refers to a hôtel particulier a grand urban mansion). Thus, the admiral resumed his position in royal council. Having been welcomed by the constable de Montmorency, the Coligny-Châtillon brothers were lodged at the Louvre.

The Spanish ambassador bitterly testifies to the great favour enjoyed by Châtillon brothers after their 20 November return to the French court. On the occasion of Holy Innocents Day, the king spent the occasion at the residence of Coligny, as did his mother. On 3 January 1564 he noted that they spent the evenings in Catherine's chambers, until she undressed and they then went to Charles' chambers tarrying to the point at which the king went to sleep. With the king asleep, they massed in the great hall to keep watch for an hour or so, numbering some one-hundred-and-fifty men. Chantonnay also alleged that Catherine enjoyed long secret meetings with the admiral de Coligny and seigneur d'Andelot. At the end of January, Coligny received a royal gift of 60,000 livres. The prince de Condé had been compensated similarly. Coligny's brother Andelot, the seigneur de Genlis, and the comte de La Rochefoucauld also received gratuities for their loyalty. Champion interprets these gifts rather as bribes to secure the departure of these men from the French court.

==== Murder of the sieur de Charry ====
According to a 26 November letter of the English ambassador Throckmorton, Coligny's life remained in danger, and an archer who had been tasked with assassinating him in the Louvre was arrested around this time. English observers also claimed that all mail to Coligny and d'Andelot at court was screened by Catherine.

On 6 December, Catherine attempted to broker a peace between the Coligny-Châtillon and Lorraine-Guise, but this went nowhere. The situation in the capital was hot at this time, with violent incidents disrupting services. Gangs of liviried supporters of both parties in the quarrel roamed the streets of the capital, exchanging taunts, insults, and challenges.

During December, the Lorraine-Guise attempted to make the case that the royal council should not have oversight of criminal cases. In response to this Coligny petitioned again for the maintenance of the evocation.

The seigneur d'Andelot enjoyed the position of colonel-général de l'infanterie for the French infantry on the near side of the Alps. This was to the displeasure of several recently elevated Catholic infantry regiment commanders affiliated with the queen mother Catherine: her cousin the seigneur de Strozzi, the sieur de Charry (a 'faithful servant' and firm Catholic according to Champion), and the comte de Brissac, who refused to subordinate themselves to a Protestant. Their defiance of the authority of d'Andelot was encouraged by the crown. Andelot's position as colonel-general was also to the displeasure of the Spanish king Philip, and his advisor, the duke of Alba. It was justified to the Spanish not as a new appointment, but rather a resumption of the office he had held before the war per the terms of the edict of Amboise. Andelot was not the only colonel-general of the infantry, a second colonel-general was stationed at Pignerol, and responsible for the French infantry of what remained of French Piedmont, this role was held by the son of the comte de Brissac, Timoléon de Cossé.

The sieur de Charry, who was also a partisan of the Lorraine-Guise, and who acted in defiance of his nominal commander the seigneur d'Andelot, regularly quarrelled with his superior officer. On 31 December the two men had quarrelled. A handbill was placed in Catherine's bedchambers, exhorting her to dismiss Charry and other ultra-Catholics from positions of command. On the morning of 1 January 1564, the sieur de Charry was walking along the pont Saint-Michel with a captain La Tourette and another soldier when they were attacked by several men. The sieur de Charry's killers were Coligny's ensign, the Protestant Chastelier Portaut; the seigneur de Mauvans (a Protestant commander of the south), and a third man. The deed done, the men fled along the quai des Augustins and reached their horses. Charry's killer, Chastelier Portaut, was suspected by the lieutenant-général of Guyenne, Monluc, an associate of the victim, of only being the trigger man for a greater figure. By this, Monluc implied that the killing was undertaken on the orders of Coligny or d'Andelot. This was the view taken by the wider Catholic party, in particular the Catholics of Paris who saw the shadowy hand of Coligny and Andelot behind the deed. Chastelier Portaut had that morning spent two hours in conversation with the admiral de Coligny, and slept in his chambers. The historian Crété argues that the killing had little to do with religion, and was rather a private quarrel brought about by the sieur de Charry having recently killed a brother of Chastelier Portaut. Knecht reports that the sieur de Charry's murder of Chastelier Portaut's brother was an event fourteen-years in the past, but he likewise points the finger at this incident as evidence of a private quarrel being the impetus for the murder. Catherine declined to level any prosecutions for the murder of the sieur de Charry. Charry was afforded a magnificent funeral by the Catholics, being laid to rest in the Notre-Dame, near the alter where the duc de Guise's heart was buried.

A few days after this murder, on 4 January, Charles, on the advice of Catherine, declared that the Coligny-Guise dispute would be put on ice for three years (the historian Haan notes in practical terms this was indefinite). In the intervening period, neither side were to act upon the affair. He gave both sides permission to retire from court but would not oblige them to do so. This was agreeable to Coligny, but of great distaste to the Lorraine-Guise party. On 5 January the young duc de Guise and the admiral de Coligny were publicly reconciled. Shortly afterwards, the Lorraine-Guise family, with the exception of the cardinal de Guise, departed from the French court in disgust. The Spanish king Philip, who sympathise with the Lorraine-Guise cause, watched on as the family made their departure from court. The historian Champion records the departure differently. In his telling, part of the judgement itself involved the absenting of the Lorraine-Guise and Coligny-Châtillon from court for its duration. Excepted from this prohibition was the cardinal de Lorraine and dowager-duchesse de Guise. The Lorraine-Guise family quickly left, while the Coligny-Châtillon family were more reticent to depart, with Coligny stating he little desired to abandon the king. Catherine celebrated her son as a Solomon for the act. As matters would not remain quiet for three years, Catherine would not prove inclined to wait until the expiration of the pause to resolve the matter.

Crété sees in Catherine's approach here, a denial of justice to Coligny, who lost the ability to have his innocence proclaimed. By this means, the threat of vengeance could be allowed to remain hanging over his head. She notes this was indeed the opinion on the matter of the contemporary seigneur de Tavannes, a confident of Catherine's.

On the eve of the court's departure for the château de Fontainebleau, the cardinal de Lorraine, who was presently absent, indicated his intention to come to court. This presented a problem as the admiral de Coligny had not yet left court. A meeting between the two men was unadvisable. Finally, the admiral de Coligny resolved to withdraw to Châtillon, thereby avoiding incident. He made his departure from court on 19 January. His brother, the seigneur d'Andelot, reached the French frontier the same day Coligny made his departure from court. Andelot was there to inspect the border from Lorraine on up to Calais. The prince de Condé was also to be absent from court, conducting an inspection of the border defences in Picardy. The cardinal de Lorraine would arrive at court on 29 January. The Venetian ambassador made note of the rotating court presence of the two factions, with the arrival of one party at court proving the occasion for the departure of the other. Though he would briefly return to court in March 1564, the admiral de Coligny would be absent from the court on his estates for the next two years. Here, he was far away from the hatred he enjoyed with the Lorraine-Guise party.

Not long after his departure, while on the road from Châtillon to Tanlay, the latter being the residence of the seigneur d'Andelot, the admiral de Coligny came under arquebus fire. After visiting Tanlay he would return to his estate at Châtillon.

With the wholesale departure of his house from court in January, the cardinal de Lorraine took the opportunity to reconfigure the family's strategy. He wished to develop a more non-confessional support base for the struggle against the Coligny-Châtillon, and he therefore sought to brin the prince de Condé into the fold.

When, d'Andelot married a certain Anne de Salm, a Catholic noble from Lorraine, this aroused the vexation of the house of Lorraine-Guise. Andelot appeared before Nancy, the capital of Lorraine, with a hundred horse and requested entry. The duc de Lorraine informed him he anticipated the presence of the cardinal de Lorraine imminently, and that he should seek his lodgings elsewhere. Andelot and Anne rendezvoused in the nearby village of Essey. As they entered the château, the Protestants fired an arquebus salute, in the manner of the German reiters. Hearing all this a little way away, the duc de Guise, only fourteen-years-old announced he wished he had an arquebus so that he might fire on the 'rogues'. The gathering of the Protestant notables for Andelot's marriage aroused the suspicion of some in the French court (then on the royal tour of the kingdom) that they were hatching plans to assume arms.

Not long after this episode, the duc de Lorraine wrote to Andelot, prohibiting him from undertaking a Protestant marriage in Essey, or undertaking any preaching in the city. After a few days of celebration in Essey, the Protestants departed for Coligny's domain of Châtillon.

In August 1564, the cardinal de Lorraine met with the prince de Condé at Soissons. Here, the cardinal de Lorraine proposed a match for the recently widowed Condé with the widow Anne d'Este, or the widowed Mary Stuart. The historian Carroll suspects that part of the product of their discussions was a request for the neutrality of Condé in any dispute between the Lorraine-Guise and the Montmorency. The English ambassador Smith observed the proposal to still be active in November. Cardinal Granvelle, the Spanish representative in the Netherlands, by contrast put little stock in the Condé-Mary match, holding more weight for the proposal of an engagement between the prince de Condé and the widowed duchess of Guise. For the Spanish, the hand of Mary was too important to be spent on a French enterprise like this to win Condé.

Always in fear for his life, the cardinal de Lorraine was accompanied by a retinue of fifty-men. This included such times as when he sang Mass or preached.

==== Showdown in Paris ====
The cardinal de Lorraine intended to assert himself with an entry into Paris by which he might test the opinion of the capital in terms of its political and religious loyalties. Before doing so he tarried several days at the suburb of Saint-Denis. Summoning the duc d'Aumale (who was then on his estates at Anet, the two linked up at the Guise territory of Nanteuil, which was between Paris and Soissons. Their combined entourage was led by commensal officers of the cardinal, several of whom were known ultra-Catholics.

On the afternoon of 8 January 1565, the cardinal de Lorraine let it be known he intended to enter the capital in force, with a guard of arquebusiers. With him was the duc d'Aumale (who would enter via a different gate), his nephew the duc de Guise, and many others who were heavily armed. His ambitions to take stock of his popularity in this fashion were challenged by the governor of the capital and the Île de France, the maréchal de Montmorency who showed him the king's declaration of 13 December of the previous year, in which it was declared that no one of any social standing might travel about the capital under arms. Though the cardinal de Lorraine enjoyed a dispensation on this matter granted to him by Catherine he declined to present this to Montmorency. The maréchal de Montmorency reported to the court later that he had spoken before the parlement on 8 January that he would welcome the cardinal de Lorraine into the capital if he came without his guard. Conversely, if the cardinal defied the king's edicts and entered the capital under arms, Montmorency would demonstrate to him that he was not above the law. Crété imagines the reason for this as having been that the cardinal de Lorraine felt it was beneath his dignity to present it to Montmorency. The Île de France, in which Paris is located, was traditionally a Montmorency stronghold, the location of their chief seigneuries. The Lorraine-Guise however had endeavoured to usurp this claim of ownership over the Île de France through the building of an extensive Parisian clientele off the back of their religious orthodoxy and the late duc de Guise's military victories.

The cardinal entered Paris via the porte Saint-Denis under arms as he had planned that day. He had with him thirty arquebusiers and two hundred cavalrymen dressed in their travelling clothes. Around the crossroads of the rue Saint-Denis and rue Saint-Honoré, by the church of the Holy Innocents, his force encountered that of the governor Montmorency (who boasted a bi-confessional group of soldiers among whom was the Protestant prince de Porcien). The duc d'Aumale had meanwhile entered Paris via another gate, leaving the cardinal de Lorraine's party isolated. In the report that the maréchal de Montmorency later produced on the affair for Catherine and the queen of Navarre, events transpired as follows. The cardinal de Lorraine was beseeched to lay down his arms, but he refused. At this moment, an arquebusier in his entourage shot a gentleman who was with the maréchal de Montmorency. Montmorency and his men then charged, and in the scuffle that followed, the Lorrainer party was dispersed. Lorraine and the young duc de Guise, pistols in hand, were forced to shelter in the nearby house of a rope maker. A Genoese agent of the Spanish ambassador reported the episode differently. In his telling, the cardinal de Lorraine and duc de Guise were about to retreat to a house when they received a fusillade of arquebus fire that hit the door frame they had just entered. One of the bullets is to have hit a man of the cardinals. The cardinal then ordered a counter attack that left a man of the prince de Porcien dead. Either way, come the evening the cardinal de Lorraine withdrew to the hôtel de Cluny where he linked up with his brother, the duc d'Aumale. The victorious Montmorency did not pursue the scattered Lorraine partisans, but, according to the contemporary historian Aubigné, his men did march by the hôtel de Cluny each one of the following days, and they taught the people to sing mocking verse. The Genoese agent of the Spanish ambassador reports that the maréchal de Montmorency rode through the city with a band of 400 men dressed in white armbands so they would recognise one another. After two nights, the cardinal de Lorraine pulled out of Paris to his house in Meudon, encouraged to do so by the parlement of Paris.

His brother, the duc d'Aumale, stayed near the city with a host of nobles, having conducted a march through the suburbs of the capital. He would ultimately retire to Anet, from where his calls to arms were ignored. This was to the apprehension of the maréchal de Montmorency. He wrote to Charles and Catherine to appraise them of what had transpired in the capital and assure them of his loyalty. In royal council, the constable de Montmorency fiercely defended the actions of his son. The maréchal sent word to the admiral de Coligny (who was then on his estates) to come and support him in Paris. The maréchal de Montmorency's brother, the seigneur de Méru who was sympathetic towards Protestantism also hurried to the capital to proffer aid. Coligny would indeed rush to offer his assistance to the maréchal, arriving in Paris on 22 January with a host of three-hundred gentlemen. He was greeted as family by the maréchal de Montmorency the following day. He would stay in the capital until 30 January. The maréchal de Montmorency convened a council comprising the seigneur de Boisy and several parlementaires (the présidents de Thou, Séguier and de Harlay. Before these figures, the presence of Coligny at his side was justified. The admiral was a 'loyal man' and would not deal in matters of religion during his time in the capital. Coligny then spoke, noting that he was only here as his presence had been requested by the maréchal de Montmorency, and that he had no other ambitions for his time in Paris than to see affairs that had been ignited by a rogue few soothed. He dismissed ideas that he intended to sack the capital, and that he possessed a retinue of over a thousand for this purpose. An attack on the capital would be as to attack the king himself, and there was no greater loyalist of the French crown than he. The admiral opined that this view of him had been instilled among the entire population of Paris. The source of this rumour was to be found among the grandees, who were the ones capable of bringing such a libel to the masses. As concerned the accusations that he had handed Le Havre over to the English during the first civil war, this was, in Coligny's telling, untrue. He noted that since the peace, five-hundred Protestants had been killed, and had received no justice from the authorities, with Catherine and Charles only offering words and instructions. In particular he raised the example of the massacre of Protestants in Tours in the presence of the agents of the duc de Montpensier. Indeed, if people complained about these murders, the walls of their cities and the houses of their gentlemen would be razed. Concluding his address, the admiral highlighted that on his lands, Catholics were free to practice their religion. This did not derive from any love he had for Catholicism, but rather an obedience to the king's edicts. Another meeting transpired the following day, in which Montmorency and Coligny were met by various bourgeois of the city, ecclesiastics, and the prévôt des marchands (provost of the merchants - de facto mayor of Paris). Coligny took the opportunity to remind them that he had once been governor of Paris, and reinforced the message of the day just gone, hitting similar beats such as the ridiculousness of the idea that he might sack Paris, and his love of service of the crown. Coligny then went to the parlement, where he was welcomed by de Thou. The admiral avoided coming to the parlement with a pre-written harangue, so that it might not be thought that he was making a religious case. He offered his services, spoke to all in a friendly manner and again denied that he wanted to sack Paris. According to the informant of the Spanish ambassador, Coligny's assurances did not sooth the parlementaires. A speech given in response analogised him to the fear induced among the Romans by Julius Caesar. Meeting with the king's brother, the duc d'Anjou, Coligny could get no response from the prince to any of his entreaties. Anjou only offered a reply when Coligny inquired how Anjou was passing his time. The young prince responded that he was devoting himself to hunts with the duc d'Aumale, something that surprised Coligny. The admiral de Coligny departed for Châtillon on 30 January.

Meanwhile the prince de Condé who was at this time in a period of détente with the Lorraine-Guise family came to the support of the Lorraine-Guise party. He decried the actions of the governor Montmorency as an abuse of his authority and hurried to Paris himself, arriving around the end of the month with three-hundred horse of his own. The maréchal de Montmorency decried his presence in the city as he had that of the cardinal de Lorraine, and the prince was unable to make it past the Bastille. This occasioned a new spat in royal council, as the constable de Montmorency came in for rebuke from the cardinal de Bourbon for having arranged with the king to see the prince de Condé sent off to his government of Picardy. Bourbon argued that Condé, who was of royal blood, had much more right to be in the capital than the admiral de Coligny, who was merely a nephew to Montmorency. Hoping to defuse this explosive situation, Catherine ordered Lorraine, Coligny and Condé all depart from the capital. Having set his affairs in order, Coligny departed Paris on 30 January. Meanwhile, Charles complimented Montmorency on well maintaining order in the capital. At the end of January, Catherine dispatched the seigneur de Thoré to the capital, so that he might report on the state of things.

In summarising Coligny's appearance in the capital, Champion finds it highly counterproductive to his cause. He argues that just as Coligny had made himself appear guilty in his defence against the charge of murdering the duc de Guise, so his protestations of benevolence in the capital were read more as a threat. The cardinal de Lorraine later complained in letters that he had almost met his death in the showdown of Paris. The episode had disproved his expectation that the people of the capital would rally to his family and party. Diefendorf notes that the populace at large remained largely absent from the quarrel. While they were more animated by the admiral de Coligny's appearance in the capital, their animation was expressed in pamphlets and placards, rather than riots or other disorders.

In an anti-Lorraine pamphlet that was quickly published after the episode, the cardinal de Lorraine was decried. In this text, it was related how a prelate, who should rightly have as a weapon the word of god, had instead bore arms. The maréchal de Montmorency had meanwhile fulfilled his duty as governor of the capital. Protestant pamphlets were able to revel in the failure of the Lorraine-Guise family to inspire sympathies in the capital. The contemporary Protestant historian La Planche took the troubles of the cardinal as the basis for a vicious satire entitled Livre des Marchads.

==== Forming a league ====
The duc d'Aumale protested against the request to leave the capital and retire to Champagne. In late February, he liaised with his brother, the marquis d'Elbeuf about forming an association, which Champion sees as the forerunner of the Catholic Leagues. On 17 February 1565, Aumale entered Rouen, on the pretext of undertaking private business. Many Rouennais came to meet with him, and he visited the Vieux Palais, whose captain Louis de Bigars, was an ultra-Catholic. From Rouen, Aumale went on to Champagne, continuing to probe around for support should things come to civil war. Aumale had little confidence in the support of the common people at this time, and in a letter to his brother the marquis d'Elbeuf, he expressed his focus on the nobility for the alliance they were making (specifically the duc d'Étampes and the duc de Montpensier). Of the urban bourgeois he noted there was 'no assurance to be had in the people, as I have lately seen once again'. This letter, which contained the name of his co-conspirators, was intercepted and published by the Protestants. Francès de Álava's Genoese agent continued to sound the alarm in Paris. He wrote to the Spanish ambassador on 13 April to inform him that the Protestants were arming, that the brother of the prévôt of Paris, François du Prat had been murdered in his home by Coligny's guidon Millaud d'Allègre, and that two thousand Protestants were preparing to support Millaud. In an update on the murder of du Prat on 27 April, the same informant reported that the Protestants had threatened to make the streets run with parlementaire blood if Millaud was touched for his deed. As a result, the parlement felt paralysed. The matter of the murder had also been raised by Charles in royal council. He complained the next day of the publishing of a book in Paris that was defamatory to the Lorraine-Guise, and acted as apologism for Protestantism, the Châtillon and the Montmorency.

The English ambassador reported in September 1565 on the warm relations that existed between the prince de Condé, and two scions of the house of Lorraine-Guise: the cardinal de Guise and the marquis d'Elbeuf. Carroll sees this relationship between Condé and the Lorraine-Guise as being furthered by the former's marriage to Françoise d'Orléans-Longueville.

Champion records another incident around November 1565 that the Spanish ambassador Álava reported to Philip. On 18 November, the admiral de Coligny received word that the duc d'Aumale and cardinal de Lorraine intended to make for court. He appraised Montmorency, and the two gathered a force of three-thousand horsemen together at Melun, where the Lorraine-Guise men were to pass through on route. The Protestant seigneur de Rambouillet was sent to get this armed force to disperse, something which was accomplished, the two men returning to their estates. Around the same time, the cardinal de Lorraine had written to the cardinal de Guise and marquis d'Elbeuf to cease outreach efforts with the prince de Condé due to his recent Protestant marriage.

==== Reconciliation in name only ====
In January 1566, Catherine organised the burial of the feud between the admiral de Coligny and the Lorraine-Guise. Both men were summoned to court, which was then wintering at Moulins and housed together. The maréchal de Montmorency was likewise summoned due to his adjacent feud with the cardinal de Lorraine. The maréchal was greatly reluctant to make his peace with the cardinal de Lorraine, and it took the threat of disinheritance from his father for him to reconcile. The cardinal de Lorraine denounced Coligny before the court, but, on 29 January it was declared that Coligny was innocent of the murder of the duc de Guise. This decision was signed off on by all members of the royal council with the exception of the duc de Nemours (on account of his 'friendship for the Lorraine-Guise family'. Soon thereafter, Coligny and the cardinal de Lorraine and dowager duchesse de Guise exchanged the kiss of peace.The duc de Guise had absented himself from this reconciliation.

During May 1566, the English agents in France reported that the Catholic party worked to remove the admiral de Coligny from his charge as admiral. Coligny had refused to yield the charge, unless he was granted that of governor of the king's person. Failing this, plots were hatched to have him, his brother Andelot and the seigneur de La Rochefoucauld assassinated. Coligny understood the cardinal de Lorraine to be the architect of this plot, but when he demanded justice from the king he received none. The seigneur d'Andelot alleged to the king that Aumale sought his death, but the Lorraine-Guise disputed this charge. Condé likewise complained of would-be assassins.

In his letter of 19 May 1566, Álava recorded plans to undertake a covert meeting outside Paris late in the evening with the cardinal de Lorraine and duc d'Aumale. These men being opposed to the reconciliation Catherine had recently imposed upon them.

Soon after, Coligny made for Paris with six hundred horsemen, before heading onwards to the residence of the Constable at Écouen. Charles, now understanding there to be several thousand Protestant horsemen in the capital, ordered the maréchal de Montmorency to conduct inspections of the inns and houses of the capital, and expel those from the city who had no business being there. Several men reported to the king that Montmorency only expelled the Catholics. Offering his resignation in response, the maréchal de Montmorency would head to Écouen himself, before being invited to the French court by Catherine. On 17 August, the admiral de Coligny was forced to apologise for a meeting he had had with his brother the cardinal de Châtillon in Bresle. He had protested that the nature of the meeting was nothing more than a hunting expedition, but Charles had little believed this. According to an English letter of 21 August, the king is supposed to have threatened the admiral de Coligny with imprisonment if he would not depart from the capital.

In a report of 15 September to Elizabeth, an English agent recorded that a would-be assassin of the queen mother had been caught and implicated the admiral de Coligny in guiding his hand. The English agent ridiculed the charge.

On 31 October 1566, a would-be assassin was arrested in Paris. Interrogated, he claimed he had been charged by the cardinal de Lorraine with poisoning the prince de Porcien. Thus, when Porcien died not a year later, on 5 May 1567, rumours of foul play swirled.

Coligny was accused around this time of having plotted to kill Catherine. This accusation came after the capture of several gentleman, who when interrogated, claimed Coligny had encouraged them to act against the queen mother. Cross-examining the gentleman before the royal court, Montmorency burst into a fury at their testimony, which he found to be full of contradictions, and urged Charles to have the would-be assassins executed. Decrue finds no basis for Coligny's involvement in any such plot. He notes though that Catherine, keen to maintain a balance at court, kept the affair open, much to Montmorency's irritation. Montmorency therefore withdrew to Chantilly in October 1566, over the protestations of Catherine who sought his recall. While absent from court, Montmorency visited his nephew Coligny.

In May and June 1567, various English agents reported on plots to kill the admiral de Coligny, seigneur d'Andelot and comte de La Rochefoucauld. Indeed, Andelot had escaped an ambush in January of that year only barely.

According to the English agent Henry Norris, in August 1567, Coligny had retired to his estates, due to knowledge of designs against him. By this time, the duc de Guise had reached the age of seventeen, and was actively interested in furthering the quarrel with Coligny, when challenged on this by the queen mother, he rebuffed her pointing to the proclamation of Moulins, stating he would not let Coligny's crime go unavenged whatever the circumstances.

== State and society ==
=== Fiscal state of the kingdom ===
Through the 1560s, inflation was strong, buoyed by the import of silver from the Americas, and poor harvests (particularly those of 1565 and 1566). The government attempted to set the value of the écu soleil against the money of account, the livre. In 1561, the écu was valued at two livres and ten sols, in 1568 the valuation had shifted to two livres and twelve sols. This at least represented the official rate which sometimes deviated from that commercial transactions were undertaken at.

The chambres des comptes was ordered in 1563 to begin an investigation concerning the depreciation of the livres tournois. This was followed by a parlementaire investigation in 1565, in consideration of the high prices for grain induced by crop failures. One of the maîtres des comptes published his understanding of the situation in March 1566, determining that the price increase was not in real terms, but reflected money being itself a commodity. The actual relationship between a product and its exchange worth was static in his estimation.

The first French war of religion had left the kingdom of France with many debts. The inflationary pressures on the currency at this time, would however have the positive effect for the crown of easing the burden of the debt payments to the grand parti and petit parti of Lyon. The syndicate wanted a reconsideration of the debts terms before they would make new advances. From 1563, the crown looked to liquidate the remaining old debts, reducing them to 9,000,000 livres by the end of 1563.

In the hopes of settling the expenses of the war which had ruined the treasury, church assets with incomes amounting to 5,000,000 livres were alienated by an edict of 13 May 1563, much to the delight of Protestants. This represented a continuation of a policy that had been initiated at the Estates General of Pontoise in 1561. It was hoped to create annuities with a value of 100,000 écus a year through the selling off of this property. The money from this sell off, which lacked the authorisation of either the clergy or the pope, was to be put towards the repayment of debts accrued by the crown from the Grand Parti of Lyon (a syndicate of creditors of the city of Lyon).

To secure the registration of this land alienation by the parlement of Pars, the king and chancellor visited the body on 17 May 1563. The chancellor L'Hôpital made a speech before the parlement in which he let it be known that the royal debt stood at around 50,000,000 livres. Revenue for the present year, hampered by the depredations of war stood at 8,460,000 livres, meanwhile expenditure stood at 18,000,000 livres. Charles owed 160,000 livres to the gendarmerie, 230,000 to the German reiters (who had been hired as mercenaries during the war) 354,000 to the Picard and Champenois soldiers, 1,030,000 to the Swiss soldiers and 1,050,000 to the German infantry (also mercenaries). Adding this to the money required for the recapture of Le Havre, the king needed approximately 5,000,000 livres before Saint-Jean day (24 June). The parlement was convinced of the necessity of the measure of church alienation, the alternative being the ruin of the crown, and registered the edict. Presented with a fait accomplit pope Pius IV would assent to the alienations in October 1564.

Many rushed to take advantage of the sales. In Languedoc, the Protestant buyers of the petty nobility, merchants, and lawyers conspired to crowd out both the Catholics and the petty bourgeois of their own faith. The clergy would later reacquire some of the lands sold off. This was not universally true however, for example, the Catholic Simon Fizes acquired the barony of Sauves (the 'most remarkable acquisition' in Jouanna's words) through the sell-off. This acquisition would be disputed, and in 1566, Catherine would protest to the duc d'Uzès that those who defied Fizes claimed to be doing so in his name.

In 1567, an assembly of the clergy met to oppose the implementation of the second part of the agreement made at Pontoise in 1561. They would prove unable to avoid being inducted into a new commitment to pay 500,000 livres annually for the interest payments on the rentes of the hôtel de ville (city hall).

In 1564, Catherine organised the beginning of construction of the Tuileries Palace. This would prove to be a financial black hole. In derisive Protestant pamphlets, it was compared with the pyramids of the Pharaohs.

In 1565, rentes were levied through Rouen as an alternate line of credit for the crown to service its debt to the grand parti. Across Charles' reign, 25,9 million livres worth of rentes were issued. Government bonds continued to inspire enthusiasm among wealthy investors up to 1568, before a decline in confidence set in.

A law of November 1565 sought to transform loans in which interest was paid in produce to loans with 8.33% cash interest.

Various moves against confraternities and guilds were undertaken during the interwar years. By letters patent of 14 Decembre 1565 the confréries de métiers were put under direct supervision. By edicts of 11 December 1566 and 4 February 1567 the holding of banquets, festivals and other celebrations were forbidden. The hosting of these events had become a nucleus for Catholic militancy.

With the parlement refusing to sign off on the sale of uncultivated land in 1566, tax collectors and treasurers were arrested. Some financiers were sentenced to death. Litigants were also taxed. This was a typical expedient. For eight months, the parlements refusal to yield on this point continued, with one of the debates on the matter even lasting ten hours. However, Charles was determined, and dispatched his brother, the duc d'Anjou, to force the issue.

In 1566, the prohibition on the alienation of the royal domain in the form of gifts was reaffirmed.

The royal deficit was such in 1566, that even with the selling off of church property, a hole of 1,800,000 livres was still left, with an immediate need for 600,000 livres. This poor fiscal situation did not stop Catherine and the king from living large during this period. While the court was staying in Saint-Maur, around May to June 1566 Catherine made a request of money from a dozen bishops, and those cardinals present already in the French court, to cover the French deficit. They shot down this proposal.

Searching for money, the French crown came down against usurers in early 1567. This had the unintended side effect of seeing the constable de Montmorency retreat from the French court to Chantilly when the house of a treasurer of his was seized.

A proposal to offer a Genoese syndicate the rights to tax dowries in an eight-year licence with a charge of an écu on the first born, and five sous for every subsequent son and three sous for every subsequent daughter, in return for a lump sum payment to the crown passed the royal council. It was however shot down by the parlement of Paris before it could become law according to English reports of April 1567. Thompson describes the measure as 'preposterous'.

By ordinance of May 1567, inheritance law in the south of France was modified, such that widows could not inherit from their children in the case where the children predeceased their mother, something permitted by Roman law. Rather, the property would go up the paternal line.

Around the summer of 1567, the constable de Montmorency was ascendant in state affairs. With the alienations made against the church having failed to create a fiscally sound situation in the kingdom, he proposed a tax on paper in the hopes of remedying this, but this tax was rejected by the parlement.

=== Peacetime military ===
==== Gendarmes ====
Beyond simple military units, a gendarme company (the heavy cavalry that formed the core of the French military) was also a mark of royal favour and status. During the closing months of the civil war, the duc de Guise had expanded the gendarmerie up to an unprecedented total of 103 units for a strength of 10,000 men. In addition to his own clients, Guise also handed out companies to members of the Montmorency and Bourbon families, loyal provincial leaders such as the vicomte de Joyeuse and seigneur de Maugiron; distinguished soldiers of the royal army such as the seigneur de Biron, and the vicomte de Martigues; some Italian mercenary captains, and relatives of the maréchaux of France such as Timoléon de Cossé (son of the maréchal de Brissac) and seigneur de Gonnor (future maréchal de Cossé). There were also gendarmes fighting for the Protestants, including four entire companies (those of Coligny, Condé, La Rochefoucauld; and Genlis. In peace these had to be reintegrated into the wider gendarmerie. In late 1563, it was declared that no new gendarme companies would be established until such time as sufficient quantities had been disbanded by the loss of their captain (to resignation or death), with a total of 3,000 lances as the intended floor. By 1566, these reductions had been achieved. Of the 91 companies, a large number would be distributed in Picardy, Champagne and the Île de France (twelve, fifteen, and ten respectively). The provinces of Berry and the Nivernais in contrast would be entirely devoid of gendarme companies. Typically, each company (which counted between 75 and 100 men) was assigned to a locality in the province, with one third on garrison duty while the rest were furloughed in their homes.

The captains of the gendarmerie represented the cream of the French nobility. For the 1563 accounts, there were seven princes, fourteen ducs, twelve marquis and comtes, all four maréchaux, as well as the admiral and constable of France among their number. Most men-at-arms who fought in the companies were noble, and the historian Wood speculates this probably held true for the archers in the companies also. Their membership was typically reflective of a clientèle/family operation, with a study by Harding showing that 75% of the gendarmes in a company came from a single governate.

==== Infantry ====
With the coming of peace, the royal infantry was wracked by the quarrel between its Protestant colonel-general, the seigneur d'Andelot, and the Catholic commanders unwilling to subordinate themselves to him. Hoping to cool down the tensions in the army, the royal infantry was distributed across the kingdom to the key border cities of Toul, Verdun, Metz, and Calais. Only the king's guard remained with him.

At the start of each year, états were drawn up, which authorised payments to the infantry of the kingdom. The northern état for 1566 survives. This document demonstrates that Charles intended to maintain 5,804 foot soldiers in arms in the country, alongside around 300 officers and specialist personnel. The border territories of Picardy, the Pays Messin (the area around Metz), and French Piedmont played host to 62% of this infantry for garrison duties. Only twenty-one of the listed garrisons were larger than fifty soldiers. Specific citadels saw much stronger garrisons, as in 1566 where Calais, Metz, Lyon, and the French Italian possessions alone accounted for over 50% of the royal infantry. Around a tenth of the infantry was assigned to the king's suite. A secondary source of garrison soldiers existed in the form of mortepays, these were older or wounded soldiers, who would not be mobilised for service in the field. These troops were a low priority for the crown, and rarely paid on time.

By 1567, all the regiments (of which there had been eight, for a total of eighty-six companies) that had fought in the first civil war would be disbanded, save the king's guard, composed of eleven companies.

With the exception of a handful of Swiss, and some Italians, mercenaries were not employed during peace time, even though at war they formed a large part of the royal army.

==== Artillery ====
For the artillery, in 1566, the number of personnel recorded in the états amounted to three-hundred-and-forty total, of which two-hundred-and-ninety-six were in Paris (chiefly at the Arsenal). Fifty-two of these personnel were officers, two-hundred-and-eleven cannoneers, and seventy-seven technical staff (overwhelmingly concentrated in the capital).

On the basis of this information, Wood puts the maximum strength of the peace time royal army in 1566 at 16,090 men. In a country of around 20,000,000 persons this worked out at 1 of every 1,250 inhabitants of the kingdom serving as a professional soldier in peacetime. Scattered across the country, this force was inconvenient to bring together in a way that would not be obvious to the Protestants.

=== Treatises and polemics ===
==== Power of the prince ====
Various political treatises were published during the years of peace after the first civil war.

Among them, Jean Heluis, published a mirror for princes, dedicating his work to the duc d'Aumale. In this work, he argued that god established princes in their positions so that they might maintain their realms in peace and order with just laws, and their military power.

Louis Le Caron and Pierre Boistuau (who dedicated their works to the duc de Nevers and the king/queen mother respectively) also expounded upon this theme. The dignity of the prince was best preserved by maintaining his subjects in peace and union. The love between a monarch and his subjects should be equally flowing in both directions. Boistuau challenged the radical constitutionalists of the era, who argued that obedience of a king's subjects flowed through the provision of peace. He stated that in addition to peace bringing about the subjects love of their sovereign, it also allowed them to bear witness to their sovereigns love for them. By the term love he meant obedience, respect, and the firm authority of a father over his children.

Le Caron refused to engage with the theology of the religious conflict, seeing it as only a pretext for the violence of the parties. Chief among Le Caron's concerns were law and politics and the 'good of the Republic'.

Musing on the origins of 'civilisation', Le Caron painted a picture of a violent world in which men were ruled by their passions. The reality that this descended into violence led to the elevation of a governor, who might command them, thereby restricting these violent passions. This kind of analysis, whereby the political society of government is entered into voluntarily by a people seeking to escape the chaos of violent passions was not novel but had particular resonance in a kingdom emerging from a civil war.

==== Resistance theory ====
This raised the problem of the prince who decided to pursue ends other than the community he governs. Was the populace devoid of any sovereignty, all having been granted away to the prince? It is on this point that the advocates for peace split from one another. Some favouring a radical constitutionalism that showed the seeds of resistance theory, while others looked to strengthen the royal authority. The divide between these two camps did not map neatly onto the confessional split of Catholic and Protestant theorists.

The anonymous author of the 1567 Requeste et remonstance du peuple addressante au Roy took a provocative position on this issue. The king was nothing without his people, and he owed their obedience to god. The place of the king existed to facilitate the good of his people, not the reverse. It was not for the king to pick and choose among his people in determining which ones he required to legitimate himself, rather it was universal consent of the populace.

Another author, the sieur de Boucart, adopted a similar position, though more cautiously stated. The king was placed over the people by god so that he might preserve civil society. The royal pacification was deplored, as it violated the principles of justice by which law and rights was applied equitably to all. Instead, seditious individuals, with the complicitly of their governors, were acting with impunity. With the political authority failing to do what it must, the impulse at the hearts of men, implanted by god, to preserve themselves necessitated a right to assuming arms in their own defence. Thus, Boucart argued that the king's ultimate authority was one that had been delegated to him by the populace, which, should he fail to exercise it properly, they could re-assume the action of.

This same style of argument could also be exercised in the opposite direction. Here, it was argued that it was Charles' duty to restore the unity of faith, with violence if necessary. The writer Jean Talpin went some way in this direction, speaking of the role of the king in ensuring one faith and one law. However, though he argued that the monarch must endeavour to see the Catholic faith be held by all, he conceded that in the case of stubborn individuals, sometimes a diversity of faith must be conceded begrudgingly. This, only if it was not the cause of scandal.

An anonymous work addressed to the cardinal de Lorraine took up this argument for mutual obligations. The king was obligated to his subjects and they to he. So too a remonstrance of June 1564 seeking to justify the expropriation of church property.

These political theories that were being developed from 1563-1567, by which the monarchs' power was limited by certain binding obligations, would reach their full blossoming in the coming decades in the theorists of the Monarchomachs and Catholic League.

In the 1563 work La deffense civile et militaire des innocens et de l'Eglise de Christ, the example of the resistance of the Maccabees, who had risen up against the tyrant Antiochus IV Epiphanes, was presented. Thus could a prince who imposed himself on his subjects' consciences be resisted with arms. Those who had a special calling from god could disobey royal orders and enact regicide against those rulers who impeded the abolition of idolatry. In addition to usage of the Old Testament, the Apocrypha was dipped into for approval of the Maccabean revolts. More contemporary thinkers, such as the work Courtier by Baldassare Castiglione, as well as the works of the contemporary jurist Dumoulin. While courtier was approvingly cited for its discussion of how the courtier was not obligated to obey an immoral command, less approval was given to the claim of that work that the prince enjoyed a semi-divine status. No copies survive, and its arguments are pieced together from works that challenged it. The Protestant seigneur de Soubise, who was still in power in Lyon, as well as the Protestant pastor Viret, denounced the work. Soubise declared it seditious and ruled that its sale would result in summary hanging. Those extant copies were to be handed over to be burned. Viret meanwhile attacked the contents, comparing them to Anabaptism, and charging the work with distorting the scripture. Looking for a scapegoat, they turned to Dumoulin, who had been cited in the work. He was arrested and jailed but was subsequently able to exonerate himself and regain his freedom, having argued that resistance theory was alien to his beliefs. Once more free, Dumoulin further looked to clear his name by writing a refutation. The revolts in the Bible were undertaken with the approval of 'lesser magistrates' against tyrants, not legitimate kings. He further accused the author of trying to transform France into a Swiss confederation. Prayer was the appropriate recourse for Protestants confronted by tyranny, and even this was unnecessary presently as the monarch was young and had as yet done no wrong. A new scapegoat was found in 1566, the pastor of Orléans Hugues Sureau. Kingdon is very sceptical of this accusation, noting that Sureau was not even in Lyon at the time of the works publication. He was imprisoned for several months before he in turn was released as innocent.

In another work, La sentence redoutable et arrest rigoreux du jugement de Dieu à l'encontre de l'impiété des Tyrans; receuillis tant des sainctes escriptures comme de toutes autres histoire, Aristotle was cited to justify the argument that a prince who abused his authority was no prince, but rather a tyrant. While the pamphlet did not endorse killing said tyrant, the examples of the deaths of Caesar, Pompey, and Antiochus were provided. The primary goal of this pamphlet was to propose a more mixed monarchy, in which ruler and ruled had a relationship determined by contract. This baton was also picked up by Question politique, s'il est licite aux subjects de capituler avec leur Prince. For this work, such a contract between ruler and ruled was at the very core of the relationship in a political society. A prince who violated such a contract, released his subjects from their duty of obedience to him, returning them to liberty.

The king ordered the arrest of a Protestant pastor who had written a book which justified tyrannicide in cases where rulers tried to suppress liberty of conscience. The seigneur de Matignon was appraised of this arrest, instructed to burn any copies of the offending book he encountered, and monitor the Protestants in his government of lower Normandy.

==== Edict of Amboise ====
In response to Bégat's famous remonstrance against the edict of Amboise, a work entitled Apologie de l'Edit du Roy sur la pacification de son Royaume was published.

Among the defenders of the edict of Amboise, its existence was intimately bound with the restoration of royal authority in the kingdom. It was in the king's council that the bound nature of royal authority and the peace of Amboise was most strongly held.

One Protestant author of 1563, whose work (Au Roy sur le faict de l'Edit) was quickly reprinted the following year, mused that the problems afflicting France were universal, but the edict only remedied them in local fashion, with worship restricted to a limited number of sites across the kingdom. Thus the disease that afflicted the kingdom could not be salved. The true tonic to France's religious troubles was complete religious freedom across the kingdom. The Catholic opposition to the pacification edict was more total. The priest of Provins fr:Claude Haton decried it as a 'Protestant edict of liberty'. Some commentators disputed the edicts legality noting that it was very provisional, and that the king daily refuted it by remaining a Catholic. Similarly, a canon of Périgueux, opined that the Protestants might have liked to invoke the edict in defence of their rights, but the terms were such as to make this embarrassing. The edict made clear its own nature as a temporary salve to the evils of civil war, as well as Charles' disdain for Protestantism.

The main thrust of a lot of Protestant works, irrespective of their radicalism, critiqued the separating out of freedom of consciousness (which was everywhere granted to them) and the freedom of worship (which was limited to specific localities). The divergence of the two freedoms ignored the social role of religion, which in turn informs the social bonds of the community necessary for peace.

On the subject of freedom of consciousness, an anonymous author opined on the risks of this. In such secret circumstances, new uncontrolled sects, or even atheism would surely bloom. Such an opinion was also taken up by the brief discours above mentioned and a 1565 work from after the publication of the edict of Roussillon. By prohibiting Protestant synods, the ability to maintain church discipline, and avoid new innovations, was harder to achieve.

The main counterweight to the argument that a united religion was necessary in a royal state was to be found in the moderate Protestant discourses. Though, members of the royal entourage like the bishop of Valence also took up the opposition. In the 1564 work Brief discours sur l'état presente et des moyens pour remedier aux troubles qu'on peut craindre cy après the role of religion and justice in binding the people to the royal authority was extolled. But it was noted that this binding function could transpire without a unitary religion. However, the provisional nature of the toleration granted by the edict of Amboise encouraged some to remain neutral in matters of religion, which was the path to atheism. The author proposed chambers in each parlement that would be impartial in religious matters. That freedom of worship across the kingdom be afforded, and religious neutrality swept from the kingdom. Other works furthered this idea that a universal law did not necessarily map to a universal religion, and that many churches could exist in one kingdom. Christin sees clauses of the peace of Augsburg in this challenge to the Catholic opposition. This same author also saw the parlements as a key cog. He found them lacking in the appropriate temperament for the peace currently, and proposed the establishment of bi-confessional chambers, drawn from the most placid and moderate men of both religions, for the judgement of religious cases. One of the key examples of the way in which they were currently unfit for purpose was how they looked to interfere with and sabotage of the commissioners who had been dispatched to enforce the peace.

The chancellor L'Hôpital himself got into the fray in 1567 with his discours sur la pacification des troubles de l'an 1567. In a question-and-answer format, he explained why the crown had made the decision to come to terms with the Protestant rebels. Victory is a gamble, and the king is a father who rather than seeing one of his children vanquish the other, would want his offspring reconciled. Peace was a more worthy victory than conquest, and the highest honour a king could enjoy was to give law to his subjects.

In the 1567 work, the Anti-Tribonian, produced by François Hotman upon the suggestion of the chancellor L'Hôpital, the thinker dismissed the need for Roman law in the governance of France. Jurists and magistrates should establish simple codes of public and private law written in French. The laws revealed to Moses would serve as a guide, with public law being led by the ancient French constitution, and private law being developed from first principles.

L'Hôpital would touch on the matter of the codification of the law himself in 1567, with the establishment of a commission to consolidate old ordinances established under the presidency of the parlementaire du Mesnil.

=== Religion ===
==== Modifications to the peace edict ====
During the years of peace after the edict of Amboise, Catherine pursued a policy of religious appeasement. She was wholeheartedly supported in this by the chancellor L'Hôpital. In the declarations, edicts, and ordinances of the interwar years, the importance of royal authority being imposed across the kingdom was reinforced. On the other hand, the crown would not interfere in doctrinal matters, or those of conscience. This would be a secondary concern of the edicts of 1563-1567 in comparison with concerns for public order and adherence to the law. The language of the edicts used terms like 'toleration' 'freedom' and 'conscience' far less frequently than ones that those which touched on troubles in the community. This included terms like 'tranquility' and 'public rest'. Thus, abstract freedoms mattered less for the legislation than did the rules of engagement between the confessions in a community. Similarly the importance of re-establishing royal authority over the kingdom.

Many Protestants disapproved of the interpretative edicts that were issued during the years of peace, seeing them as slowly constricting their rights. This was in turn a prelude to their being snuffed out. Behind this nefarious scheme was the dark hand of the cardinal de Lorraine, but also Catherine.

Only a few days after the coming of peace, on 7 April 1563, the king issued an ordinance relating to the towns of the kingdom. Those not native to a town were ordered to leave (this included soldiers and vagrants); those who had left their homes due to the war were not to be impeded on their return, the populace in all places other than the frontiers was to be disarmed; church property restored; sites set aside for Protestant worship; and religious insults and name calling prohibited.

By ordinance of May 1563, Charles stressed that his justice was to be obeyed by all regardless of station or quality. This was an important indicator of his ambition to bolster royal authority. The theme would be stressed many times in the royal legislation of the 1563-1567 peace. Indeed, in the royal edicts it would appear over twelve times.

===== Edict of Vincennes =====
In the supplementary edict of Vincennes, which was issued on 14 June, Protestants were forbidden from opening their shops during Catholic religious feast days/celebrations. The edict noted that this had already been the cause of many scandals. Protestants were enjoined to contain themselves in their residences or shops in peace on these days.

By the ordinance of 19 June, it was declared that Protestantism would not be practiced by those in the king's entourage, or at his residences. It was further stated that the viscounty, provostship and city of Paris were exempt from having to tolerate Protestant worship.

On 16 August, the people of the French towns and cities were ordered to lay down their arms within 24 hours. Assemblies under arms, the raising of funds without royal permission, and the undertaking of foreign diplomatic correspondence without the consent of the crown were also prohibited. The seigneur de Lanssac was one of those entrusted with ensuring this edict was enforced in the capital, where weapons were to be handed in. The poor of the city took their weapons to the arsenal to be sold, while the bourgeois and merchants logged theirs at the hôtel de ville (city hall). On 11 October, Lanssac issued a follow up ordinance, relating to the weapons of the seigneurs that had been handed in. This was after disturbances in which 'fully armed men' wielding arquebuses had taken place in the capital.

By the ordinance of Mantes, in September 1563, the printing of books without royal privilege was established.

In October 1563, in response to the bi-confessionalism brought forth into some municipalities by the edict of Amboise, it became necessary to modify the oath of office. the oaths the king desired from the various municipal officers was specified by Charles in an edict. Governors and the peace commissioners were urged to establish in certain cities bi-confessional municipal organs of government.

===== Declaration and interpretation of the edict =====
On 14 December 1563, a 'declaration and interpretation on the edict' was published by the crown. Alongside the rule concerning the opening of shops (disallowed on Catholic feast days as per the June edict of Vincennes), Protestants were further prohibited from opening butchers' shops on days of Catholic fasting. Thus Catholic devotional practices were imposed upon the Protestants who did not practice them. Those who in the troubles had fled from their convents must either return to the place of their monastic vows or depart from the kingdom, even if they had taken a husband or wife during their absence from the monastery/convent. Various important cities were now excluded from the terms of the edict of Amboise. Protestant worship could only occur in the designated city of the bailliage and any cities held by the Protestants to the end of the civil war on 7 March 1563. This had been a cause of disagreement between the Protestants and the crown. The Protestants took this to mean any place that was under their control, however briefly, at the time of the coming of peace could bear witness to the practice of Protestantism. Further, any place where Protestantism was practiced on that date, including covert worship could be considered to fall under the terms the crown offered. The crown interpreted this provision to mean, only places garrisoned and held militarily by the Protestants at the coming of peace, not any place their soldiers happened to be marching through, qualified for Protestant worship through this mechanism. The crown now clarified that only sites held by Protestant military force on this date were meant. The bailliage and sénéchaussée sites of Protestant worship would be collaboratively chosen by the governor and commissioner, and in the absence of the latter, by the governor alone. The more stringent curtailing of sites of Protestant worship was, in Roberts' view, a response to the Protestant strategy in places of their strength such as Poitou. Protestants in Paris were prohibited from travelling to the neighbouring bailliages for the purpose of attending their services. This did not mean they did not enjoy liberty of conscience in the comfort of their own home. If this was intolerable to them, they were to emigrate from Paris to a different bailliage. Protestant burials in the capital were to take place at night, and for the baptism of their children they would travel to the place of baptism in groups no larger than four or five. The nighttime aspect of the burials inspire comparison to plague victims for Roberts, and she argues that it reinforced the marginal status of the Protestants. This declaration also touched on the rights of Protestant worship as related to seigneurs enjoying high justice. It was clarified that in cases where they had purchased church land, or were occupying ecclesiastical office themselves, that they could not practice Protestantism in these places. For these nobles, this edict did not only restrict but also made more favourable determinations. For it was also specified a seigneur of high justice was not restricted to the practice of Protestantism in their ordinary residence. When they moved about, to other places in which they enjoyed judicial rights of any variety, they might practice Protestantism in their homes. However, the only people to participate in this worship should be their family and subjects, letting other Protestants participate would be a derogation of the peace and would be subject to first a fine, and then removal of the benefits of the edict on repeat offence. Left ambiguous was whether the right remained at the residences they were absent from thereby allowing subjects to continue Protestant worship in their seigneur's absence.

The Protestants chafed at the restrictions this interpretative declaration put upon the practice of their faith, seeing it as a confirmation of their inferior status. Knecht argues though that it was a measure designed for the preservation of public order.

In February 1564, Charles clarified that his cities were free for his subjects. It was not the business of city guards or other authorities to deny French subjects access to any French city they happened to visit, irrespective of the subject's religion. This moved the battle lines with the cities, who chose to define 'foreigner' differently to the royal understanding. For resistant cities, a foreigner was someone who was not native to that city. For Charles, the idea of a foreigner increasingly meant a Spaniard, an Italian, or other international presence. The royal definition was administratively simple from a central point, a royal agent could easily differentiate a Frenchman and a German. For the urban definition, intimate local knowledge was required that would never be accessible to a royal agent.

By interpretative declaration of 24 June 1564, the policy governing Protestant worship in the vicinity of the royal court was established (the court then being in a tour of the kingdom). It was noted that the practice of Protestant worship in the place where the court resided had been left ambiguous by the edict of Amboise, and it was now necessary to ensure there was clarity on the point. Protestant worship was outlawed within two leagues of the king's residence/the court. It would not be permitted among the royal retinue. When the king was staying in a town, Protestant worship was to cease for the duration of his time in the place, and a little while after he left, before it could resume as normal. During the king's residency, Protestants should stay modestly in their homes, where they would be unmolested. During these times, if they needed to conduct baptisms or marriages, they would have to travel to the nearest site where such was legal. This prohibition on Protestant worship even in places it was typically legal was viewed as necessary for ensuring the Catholic integrity of the crown, and therefore the kingdom.

In an interpretative declaration concerning the edict of Amboise, the king declared that Protestant pastors and ministers would only be allowed to stay at the places designated for Protestant worship and assembly. Protestants were further prohibited from establishing schools and other educational institutions.

===== Edict of Roussillon =====
On 4 August 1564, the court, then resident in Roussillon, published the edict of Roussillon which acted as a further interpretative declaration on the edict of Amboise. The king noted that parts of the original peace were ambiguous, and that he had taken it upon himself to offer clarification. While Amboise had granted the freedom of Protestant religion to gentleman and their households on their estates, the king made it clear that they could not extend this liberty they enjoyed to those other than their vassals. Those who violated this prohibition were to be treated as rebels. For the first offence of a noble of high justice, a fine of 500 écus was to be levied, for a second, confiscation. Those not enjoying high justice who hosted or attended illegal assemblies would be fined first 500 livres and subsequently subject to corporal punishment. Protestant ministers who administered such illegal services would be banished. The death penalty was brought back for iconoclasm (the destruction of religious images) as well as 'provocations'. Protestant synods were prohibited, as well as the raising of taxes by Protestants, with corporal punishment the penalty for violation of this. Those members of the clergy who, during or after the civil war, had abandoned their holy orders and taken wives were to cast off their wives or leave the kingdom of France. Men who failed to abide by this prohibition would be sent to the galleys, and women would be imprisoned perpetually. Where the Protestant faith was introduced to regions that had not been allocated to it by the edict of Amboise, this would come in for harsh punishment. Sutherland notes that confusingly, the first infraction by ministers of this variety was to be met with banishment, and the second with beating. Counterbalancing this, was an order for royal officials to allow Protestantism in all the places that the faith had been granted by the edict, but that it had not yet been realised in, within 15 days. Catholic offences were also punished by the edict, for example, interfering with legal Protestant worship put the offender in line for the death penalty.

Daussy sees the assaults on Protestant synods embodied by the edict of Roussillon as a product of the false rumours spread by the apostate Pierre Denise, who had been condemned by the April 1564 synod of La Ferté-sous-Jouarre. He had alleged that at the synod, the Protestants had made plans for an uprising against the 'tyrannical government of Catherine'. Money was to be raised, soldiers brought in from Flanders and an armed assembly held in Flanders at Pentecost disguised as a religious observance. Though the pastor Chandieu and other Protestants challenged this charge in a report of their own to the court in which they argued the synod had discussed no such topics, Catherine felt it prudent to outlaw the synods.

This interpretative declaration greatly frustrated the Protestants. They felt it made their ability to practice their faith more challenging and opened them up to dangers. Through the attack on synods and the raising of money a blow was delivered against the organisation of the church and the subsistence of their ministries. Finally, the compelled return to ecclesiastical vows for those who had allowed them to lapse, was an assault on religious conscience for those individuals. An anonymous pamphlet, published in 1564, demanded that the king withdraw the declaration of Roussillon, and further denounced the Catholic fervour of the parlements who were, in the pamphleteers opinion, incapable of enforcing the peace. In the doléance faicte au Roy, the rights of freedom of worship granted to Protestants were described as a 'captive freedom', with Charles extolled to revoke the Roussillon declaration. One pamphlet, addressed to the prince de Condé, highlighted the contradictions between the edict of Roussillon and the edict of Amboise (both in its terms and intentions). The various Protestant complaints about the declaration of Roussillon were compiled into an advertissement which was later published in 1565 with a letter foreword by the prince de Condé which was addressed to Catherine and Charles. In his letter of 31 August 1564, the prince de Condé protested to Catherine and Charles about the interpretative declaration. Condé complained that so restrictive was this edict, in particular as related to the prohibition of synods, that many would surely fall into conspiracies or even atheism as a result. Charles was invited to remember that the edict of Amboise was a universal one, and that he should not selectively withdraw the rights it had granted. The king was called on to revoke this interpretive declaration. Condé also exhorted the crown to engage in a more rigorous application of the edict of Amboise, based on numerous complaints he had received concerning its poor application. Charles and Catherine retorted that their interests were only to see a fair implementation of the edict of Amboise for all the crown's subjects.

In the contemporaneous fourth national synod of the Protestant church, which took place in Lyon from 10 August, the assembled sought to defend the institution from the royal attack. Under the presidency of Pierre Viret, the Protestant pastors drew up a defence of the synod. It was to receive the sign off of the prince de Condé and admiral de Coligny. While this petition does not survive, the one Beza and Calvin had sent to Viret a few days before the start of the synod, which served as the template does. In this petition it was argued to Charles that through the use of synods the Protestants of France could be restrained in their passions, thereby avoiding disorders. The Protestant leaders proposed that royal representatives sit in on the synods to check they were not acting illegally to raise resistance to the crown.

From Toulouse in March 1565, Charles clarified to a certain Villeparisis that the buying and selling of meat was forbidden to all during Lent, but that the Protestants were not prohibited from eating meat during this period.

In February 1566, Charles issued letters patent in which he specified that the interpretation of the pacification edict was ultimately his alone to decide. He was the 'sole guarantor of the peace, as willed by god'.

1566 would see a renewal of prohibitions on possession of bâton à feu (a type of hand cannon) . In the same ordonnance that prohibited these weapons, violations of the edict of Amboise were condemned. The people were reminded that they were to live in peace and not reignite quarrels. The prohibition on assuming arms, undertaking assemblies and other infractions was repeated.

Articles were sent by Charles to the cardinal de Bourbon for consideration of the clergy of Paris on 31 May 1566. The clergy was at that time gathered at Saint-Germain-des-Près. Two of the articles concerned the baptism of infants with one Catholic parent, another concerned Protestant schools. Three were related to the church's temporal possessions and a forthcoming edict concerning the privileges and jurisdiction of the Catholic church. Also included were articles on the curtailing of preaching to abide by the edict of Amboise, and the harassment of former Protestants who had returned to the Catholic church by their ex-coreligionists.

The crown advised, in September 1566, that it was important that local officials not engender a perception of being biased, as this would cause a reignition of the troubles.

In May 1567, Protestant preaching in Paris was again outlawed and the practice of any religion other than Catholicism in the capital was affirmed. These terms were the same as had been present in the edict of Amboise originally. Nevertheless, the chancellor L'Hôpital, who was absent from the meeting of the conseil privé at which the edict was handed down, refused to provide his confirmation to the edict. In L'Hôpital's estimation it would inflame tensions. Catherine stated that she would circumvent him and have the edict issued regardless. The parlement returned the edict back to the Charles, arguing that rather than just the city of Paris, by the terms of the edict of Amboise, it should apply to the whole diocese of Paris. They also hoped Charles would authorise the burning of Protestant books.

L'Hôpital opposed the passage of legislation evicting Protestants from municipal offices in July 1567. He refused to put his seal to a law that would have expelled Protestants from the universities.

==== Catholic church ====
===== Council of Trent =====
The final session of the council of Trent had been opened on 29 November 1560. This was to the vexation of the French crown whose preference was for a new council to be held in a more religious neutral city that might have allowed Protestants to attend without fear. Such was the desire of the cardinal de Lorraine in particular. As a result, there was a great delay in the arrival of a French delegation, which did not appear in the council until November 1562. Catherine maintained her hope of a venue change, and sent representatives to both the Spanish court (the sieur d'Oysel) and to Rome (Yves d'Allègre) in April 1563, seeking the move of the council to a city such as Worms, Speyer or Basel. René de Birague was sent to the council itself to deplore the absence of the Protestants, who were being condemned for their views in absentia, and who would surely never accept the decrees of such a council that did not include them. The council was indeed not interested in reaching an understanding with the Protestants but rather bringing about the crystallisation of Catholic dogma. Thus, when the council closed on 5 December 1563, the points of dispute between the confessions, most notably that relating to the Sacraments chief among which Christ's presence during the Eucharist was reaffirmed. The value of 'good works' was upheld. Sola scriptura was rejected, with the value of unwritten traditions placed alongside the Bible. The Latin Vulgate Bible was endorsed. The papal legates had aimed at a 'reformation of the princes', revenge for the push of secular rulers to see church reform, which would remove from secular authorities any jurisdiction over heresy, marriage, benefice nominations, or criminal jurisdiction over the clergy. The council was not without its reform though, bishops were to reside in their sees, and ensure the discipline of their clergy. Seminaries for the training of the clergy were sketched out. The system of benefices however was not to be reformed. On the subject of secret marriages, the Council did not endorse the French position, based on a 1557 edict, that parental consent was required for a marriage to be valid, but rather argued that one of the couple's priests and several witnesses were required, thus marriages where only the spouses were present were null.

Though he had gone to the council of Trent as a member of the 'middle party', the cardinal de Lorraine was reshaped by the conclusion of the council of Trent. Around the end of summer he travelled to Rome, where, Roelker sees a combination of the murder of his brother, the edict of Amboise and papal flattery as reforging his position. Back from Rome, he was able to convince the papal legates to moderate themselves in a proposal that assaulted Gallican liberties (the autonomy of the French church from papal control), but was unable to see the French ambassador to return to Trent from Venice (he having left over proposals by the papal legate to allow for the excommunication of princes). He would return to France as a true believer in the work of the council. This fundamentally divided him from his former client the chancellor L'Hôpital.

The cardinal de Lorraine was supported in the adoption of the Tridentine decrees by the French crown by the fundamentally Gallican University of Paris Faculty of Theology. The parlement of Paris viewed the adoption of the council of Trent's resolutions far more dimly. The jurist Charles Dumoulin (who was described by Kelley as being more Gallican than the king) attacked the council's resolutions, in particular that concerning marriage, as being contrary to the laws of France, and assaulting the liberty of the Gallican church. He challenged papal supremacy and the adjacent Romanist history, favouring instead a Gallican history which centred Charlemagne. The French church bloomed out of the seeds laid by the Frankish kings. He went as far as to accuse those who might push the Tridentine decrees adoption in France as being guilty of the crime of lèse majesté. For the moment this attack was too much for the parlement, which felt Dumoulin had slipped into matters of doctrine. He, and his work, were thus censured. A less brutal attack came from the parlementaire Baptiste du Mesnil, who argued the Tridentine decrees contradicted the edict of Amboise, which was in force until such time as a true General Council of the church transpired. Du Mesnil was an ally of L'Hôpital, and channelled his perspective on the matter. Lorraine and the chancellor L'Hôpital would come to blows over the matter of adopting the Tridentine decrees at royal council in early 1564, with the cardinal becoming so heated he suggested that L'Hôpital should drop his mask and declare himself a Protestant. After a consultation on the matter, Catherine resolved to defer a decision on their adoption to a later date.

The bishop of Verdun took individual initiative in 1564 to dedicate a diocesan synod to the Tridentine decrees. In a similar spirit, the cardinal de Lorraine communicated the decrees to a provincial council during 1564.

The final act of the council was the publication of a list of banned books in 1564. The Bible was only to be read in the vernacular (i.e. translated) under the authorisation of the bishop, for fear that otherwise fanciful conclusions on the meaning of the scripture might be reached. In 1567, an official Catholic Catechism would be published in French.

====== Jesuits ======
The Jesuits, who had been permitted to operate within France in 1561, opened their collège de Clermont in Paris in 1564, so that they might train the next generation of Jesuit leaders in France. The historian Venard describes the entry of the Jesuits into France as a revenge for religious toleration. This collège was to the great irritation of the university of Paris, which entrusted a certain Étienne Pasquier with prosecuting an inditement against them in 1565. This failed to stop the operations of the Jesuit collège. Several Jesuits had followed the peace of Amboise with an attempt to see Catholicism restored in Lyon. These men sparred with the Protestant Pierre Viret, with one of them producing a popular catechism. In 1565, they received the concession of the collège de La Trinité in Lyon. From 1565, the kingdom was divided into two provinces by the Jesuits, France and Aquitaine.

===== Papal attack on the French clergy =====
By papal monitoire, the pope summoned eight French bishops (those of the diocese of Uzès, Dax, Aix, Valence, Oloron, Lescar, Chartres and Troyes), who were suspected of Protestantism to appear before him in Rome. Also summoned by a separate process was the cardinal de Châtillon (bishop of Beauvais) who was burned in effigy in Rome. The accused had six months to appear. In explaining the choice of these candidates Baumgartner notes that those bishops already deposed or denied their benefices were not bothered with by the papacy, he draws those summoned into two camps. They had either conducted themselves to the suspicion of the papacy at the colloquy of Poissy (Uzès, Valence, Dax, Troyes, Chartres) or were closely associated with the queen of Navarre (Oloron, Lescar) despite lacking any evidence of heretical beliefs. He notes that the bishop of Aix did not fall into either of these categories, and observes the curious absence of the bishop of Séez from the list. Pierre Duval, the bishop of Séez, had been involved in the colloquy of Poissy and conference of Saint-Germain, the product of which was condemned by the Sorbonne, and had come under attack from the Catholic establishment for his court preaching (having been appointed to the role by Catherine). Subject to these assaults, he ultimately resigned his see in 1564. Further, that the bishop of Dax's only relationship to Protestantism seemed to relate to his position on religious tolerance, and his proximity to the Châtillon. Baumgartner finds many non-cited bishops against whom a more credible case of heresy could have been made. The citations of these eight prelates were only published in Rome, but word quickly made it back to Paris. The bishop of Valence and Dax quickly protested their loyalty to the Catholic church. That of Troyes (who had already resigned his benefice before word reached him of his citation) wrote to the papal nuncio Santacroce, describing how emotionally distraught the citation had made him, and his keenness to prove his affinity for Catholicism. The archbishop of Aix meanwhile would, upon learning of the charges against him, denounce the pope from his pulpit, before casting down his mitre and leaving to join with the Protestants. He subsequently attempted to sell the benefice of Aix to the vicar general of Aix, but the pope refused to recognise the transfer. There was little appetite in the French government to see Frenchmen extradited from the country to sit before papal judges. Papal justice was neither directed by the king, nor was it possible for it to be appealed to the parlements. Catherine therefore protested that putting French clerics before the papal judges violated the liberties of the Gallican church, and that they should be tried in France.

Though the prelates were shielded from papal consequences, Baumgartner notes that subsequently cases of apostasy among the French prelates declined sharply. He argues this probably had as much to do with the atmosphere inside France as it did the papal threats. The French crown was far more careful in its post 1563 appointments to choose suitably orthodox candidates.

The cardinal de Châtillon was excommunicated by the pope on 31 March 1563, having been cited for heresy in the preceding November. The Protestant prelate was to be deprived of his benefices. Despite the recent civil war, Châtillon remained close to Catherine. She and the king's council offered him their support, shielding him behind the liberties of the Gallican church. The constable de Montmorency lobbied the papacy to reverse their decision. Montmorency is to have defended his nephews right to the office of cardinal, arguing that the edict of Amboise assured him of his right to maintain himself in the purple. Nevertheless, Châtillon resigned as bishop of Beauvais in favour of Noailles, the current bishop of Dax. The see of Dax, Landes was thus transferred to Noailles brother, Gilles de Noailles. The new bishop of Beauvais, who had been arraigned on charges of heresy was then chosen by Catherine to make for Rome to secure the new bulls of office for he and his brother in their respective bishoprics. This served both to endorse Noailles' character and also poke at the papacy. Pius refused to receive Noailles as ambassador but agreed to separate his case from the other accused prelates.

The Grand Inquisitor proposed a compromise, by which the bishops of Valence, Troyes and Lescar would be deprived of their benefices, while the others charged would simply be suspended from their spiritual duties until such time as they could demonstrate their repentance. This was just as unacceptable to the French crown as the original proposal. Thanks to the intervention of the seigneur de Monluc, by letter of 20 December 1563, the judgement against Valence was suspended.

With pressures applied, the excommunication of the cardinal de Châtillon would be lifted, and he was permitted to resume his priestly duties to the scandal of the Spanish ambassador and other prelates. Hoping to sooth this sore, Catherine sought to get him to voluntarily renounce the cardinal's hat in 1564, but Châtillon refused, and became more flagrant in his Protestantism, ceasing to attend Mass. This would be followed by his undertaking a marriage with a certain Isabelle de Hauteville. The Spanish asserted the two had been living out of wedlock for a while before this. The wedding of the couple transpired on 1 December 1564. Present for the occasion were the cardinal's two brothers, Coligny and Andelot, in addition to the prince de Condé. Though now married, the cardinal would continue to wear his red cardinal robes when he frequented the French court. The papacy was scandalised by the cardinal de Châtillon, a Protestant cardinal living in 'concubinage', and was particularly interested to bring about his rigorous prosecution.

Decrue sees the pope's condemnation of the cardinal de Châtillon, as the nucleus of the constable de Montmorency's antipathy towards his nephews, whom he had previously enjoyed hopes of one day being restored into the fold of the church.

The cases against the French bishops rumbled on until the death of Pius IV in 1565. He was succeeded as pope by Pope Pius V, who had previously served as the Grand Inquisitor that charged the French prelates. He was uninterested in letting the issue drop, and in December 1566, he declared that the seven prelates remained in error and declared the sentence by which they would be deprived of benefice and title. Pius demanded the French crown execute the judgement. But, the French court was uninterested in enforcing these decisions. The offending bishops continued to receive their clerical revenues, and no replacements were appointed for their sees. Both the bishop of Valence and that of Uzès protested against their 1566 condemnation to Charles. Both argued they were good Catholics. Valence continued to occupy an ambiguous religious position, stating that his only superiors were the king and god. The parlement of Paris gave order, with Charles's approval, for the two dioceses to not accept anyone else as bishop.

Pope Pius V increased his pressure on the French church in 1566. He announced by Papal bull of 16 June that greater severity should be applied to the treatment of Protestants, by bull of 20 June that the Tridentine decrees should be implemented, and that the Protestants should be exterminated on 27 June. In general terms, the Protestants were condemned by Pius' bull of 17 October. These bulls were ignored by the French crown.

==== Protestant church ====
===== Response to Amboise =====
Daussy contrasts the attitude of the broader Protestant nobility with that of the Protestant clergy on the subject of the edict of Amboise. While before the civil war, both the nobility and clergy were able to imagine the conversion of the royal family to Protestantism and the total triumph of the Protestant faith, after the edict of Amboise, the former resigned themselves to a confessional coexistence with Catholicism. The latter group still imagined the possibility of the final victory of Protestantism in France. The Calvinist spiritual leader de Beza for example, saw the leading members of the Protestant nobility as key to facilitate the conversion of king Charles IX. The Protestant bishop of Nevers, Spifame entreated Catherine in June 1563 to choose the path of the gospel (i.e. Protestantism), and set her son on the road to be a new David. Similarly, in a 1566 work by Philone published in Geneva, Charles was analogised to Josiah. Having received knowledge of the book of law (here the gospel), Josiah bemoans having been ignorant for so long, and resolves to impose it upon his kingdom. This frustrates the followers of Baal (i.e. the Catholics). Philone was not alone in comparing Charles with Josiah. Having been gifted his royal dignity by god, Charles was under an obligation to see the gospel triumph in France. The historian Daussy sees these texts as functioning more for the moral support of their Protestant readership than any hopes of inspiring religious change in a Catholic reader.

The coming of peace afforded an opportunity for the Protestant church in France to intensify its structures and further its ecclesiastical discipline. The church continued to gain new converts. It was also now however losing members to Catholicism, particularly in the north of the kingdom. This was a reaction for some to Catholic violence, and for others to the hardening of confessional boundaries between Catholicism and Protestantism in these years.

===== Genevan pastors =====
The Genevan church continued its outreach and dispatch of pastors to the French Protestant church, recording the dispatch of pastors it undertook. The Register of the Company of Pastors is likely incomplete. It records that two pastors were sent in 1563, two or three in 1564, eight or nine in 1565, thirteen in 1566, and one in 1567. Of these, one was to Picardy; one to Normandy; one to Champagne; two to the Orléanais; one to Poitou; two to the Nivernais; three to Aunis, Saintonge, and the Angoumois; three to the Lyonnais; five to Guyenne; three to Languedoc; and two to Provence. Though not mentioned in the register, several pastors were sent to Dauphiné as confirmed by other records. In provinces such as Guyenne, Gascony, and Languedoc, the majority of pastors sent could be local men from the regions. Elsewhere in the kingdom, demand had to be satisfied by Protestant pastors from further afield. This program by Geneva represented a sharp decline on the outreach of the previous seven years, during which eighty-eight missionaries were sent into France. It was only in 1566 that the numbers approached what they had in the preceding years. Geographically, the locations pastors were sent to consolidated into the areas in which Protestant lords, such as the queen of Navarre, could provide their protection. Thus, a larger proportion went to the south-west of the kingdom. Some specifically went to the courts of prominent Protestant grandees, to serve as their chaplains. Thus the prince de Porcien and seigneur d'Estrées received pastors. The latter received a pastor at the specific request of Condé, who hoped to bring Estrées more securely into the Protestant political fold.

Calvin had represented a great attraction to French intellectuals who were the best source of missionaries. Kingdon cites his death as a partial explanation for the decline in missionary dispatch from Geneva post-1562. Further explanation can be found in the plague which ravaged Geneva in 1564. The possibilities of attack by the duchy of Savoy also grew significantly more severe, after relations between Geneva and Bern collapsed. This would have served as a dissuading factor against making the trip to Geneva for potential future missionaries to France. There was also domestic competition, such as the Academy of Orléans, founded by a former Genevan pastor Nicolas des Gallars, which could provide an alternate domestic source of pastors. War had a suppressive effect, the chief one in Kingdon's mind, with the revival in demand being halted by the outbreak of war and then following a delayed resurgence with the coming of peace.

===== Succession to leadership of Calvinism =====
John Calvin, the leader of the Calvinist church, occupied an ambiguous position on his endorsement of resistance to Catholic authority. In his commentary on Acts, which was published in 1564, he argued that a prince (i.e. a ruler) who defied god's laws was no better than a man. On 27 May 1564, Calvin died. He was succeeded as leader of the Calvinist movement he had founded by his right hand man Theodore de Beza. Sutherland argues that Calvin's death to a certain extent decoupled the French Protestant movement from Geneva. De Beza described himself as a 'Burgundian gentleman', and this reflected his worldview that placed importance on the high nobility for the Protestant reformation in France. It was therefore important to keep such men in the fold. In February 1565, de Beza wrote to the prince de Condé and other high nobles. He urged them to hold strong to the Protestant creed and beware those who might try to draw them away from it. The prince de Condé in particular, as a prince du sang, was of great importance. Protestant fears were heightened by the nature of his love life, with anonymous sonnets in 1565 begging him against falling into the Guisard camp, while another compared him to the Assyrian king Sardanapalus.

Beza saw the spectre of potential ruin for the Protestant church to be found in the corruption of the Protestant doctrine. For Beza this was a war, one even more consequential than the recent civil war, and its soldiers were the Protestant pastors and doctors of religion. There were two strands to this fight, education and repression. For the former, the distribution of Calvin's catechism, which could be undertaken in the south of France by deacons who spoke Occitan. The Protestant flock would be obliged to attend several sermons a week at which they would be religiously educated. The arm of repression targeted those who had engaged in misconduct. In 1565, Beza took the fight to Charles Dumoulin, signing off on the synod of Paris' condemnation of the religiously ambiguous jurist's work. A reformation of morals was also on the cards. Marital fidelity was an important target for the church and was thus closely watched. Fancy clothing, elaborate hair, makeup and revealing necklines, dancing, and games were all viewed as immoral. Likewise plays distracted one from god, carnivals were prohibited and no work could be conducted on Sundays. This wide-ranging set of prohibited behaviour led to a deluge of cases appearing before the Protestant consistories. Excommunications could be handed down, the retraction of which required admittance of guilt. A similar 'reformation of morals' would form part of the Catholic counter reformation, though its onset arrived at a later date.

Coligny inquired of Beza around 1566/7 as to the proper role for members of the Protestant church in temporal government. Beza's reply, written at some point between the end of 1566 and the summer of 1567, noted that of course, pastors should primarily devote themselves to ecclesiastical matters rather than affairs of state. However, pastors should be consulted when political decisions were made. In the most serious circumstances, they might participate in mixed councils alongside secular authorities. The holders of secular power must after all, always act in accordance with god's will. This followed on from the opinion of Calvin, and Daussy sees echoes of it in the 20 July 1567 French Protestant ordinance that allows for clerical involvement 'if called upon'.

===== Producing narratives =====
In the wake of the first French War of Religion, a genre of Protestant publications that compiled various documents from the war and prior in such a way as to create in the reader an understanding of who was at fault for the troubles, blossomed. This historical turn was not an atheistic one, as in their understanding, history was guided by god and the works were continuing the struggle of the civil war, but non-violently. This genre was then elevated by the work of Pierre de La Place, a judicial official close to Condé who integrated documents into the narrative history he wrote. His work, Commentaires de l'estat de le religion et république, was published in 1565. Thanks to the network of Protestant printers, or those open to new ideas, the work was published in Orléans, La Rochelle, Paris and Caen. While offering the sop of neutrality, presenting both sides of the debate, it was clearly insinuated in the text that the reader was meant to adopt the Protestant position.

Beza himself planned his own history. At the synod of Lyon in August 1563, he put out a request that documents be sent forward to Geneva. By May 1565, a vast host of materials had made their way to the Swiss city. It would not be until 1579 that the work was completed. Following in the vein of Eusebius, Beza openly sought through the history to demonstrate how the Protestant church did god's work to bring about conversions to the faith and strengthen believers. For Beza, history itself was a branch of theology.

A Protestant pastor of France, Antoine de la Roche Chandieu, published his Histoire des pérsecutions et martres de l'Eglise de Paris from Lyon in 1563. With the example of those who died for their Protestant faith, he hoped to embolden his co-religionists to persevere. In addition to this, he hoped to exhort Catholic readers to repent and convert.

In 1564, Jean Crespin published a new edition of his work, now titled Actes des Martyrs. Crespin was responding to the growing Protestant interest in historical narratives with the work. Rather than a simple martyrology, through the deaths one could now trace a history of the French Protestant church.

In the field of poetry, the Protestants sought to combat the works of Pierre de Ronsard. During the civil war, Ronsard had published several polemical works against the Protestants. Chandieu called for righteous poetry to be produced that could go up against Ronsard. In the spring of 1563 this included works such as Remonstrance à la Roine mère and Replique sur la reponse faite par messire Pierre Ronsard. The work Temple de Ronsard either written by Jacques Grévin or Florent Chrestien, Seconde response de F. de La Baronie by Chrestien and the anonymously written Remonstrance sur la diversité des Poëtes all saw publication in either the summer or autumn of 1563. At the start of 1564, more works followed. In all these poems, the French Protestants were defended against the barbs of Ronsard. In particular in relation to the conspiracy of Amboise and the capture of Condé at Dreux. Roman Catholicism was denigrated in these works. Ronsard himself was attacked in these texts as being both morally and physically ugly. In his classical inspiration he forgot his Christianity. This poetry was not overly concerned with aesthetics. Daussy seeks to examine how centralised these attacks were against Ronsard and finds that several of them were the published by the same printer of Orléans, Eloi Gibier. It was in Orléans that several of the authors could be found, at least during the first civil war. Further evidence for the coordination is to be found in the small pool of authors responsible for the large majority of them.

===== Synods =====
The Protestant church hoped to re-establish at the court the presence of delegations at the court that would represent their interests. This would be the resolution reached by the Lyon Synod of August 1563. Prefiguring this at a meeting in Caen in May 1563, the pastors of Normandy appointed two representatives for court. The Lyon Synod divided the kingdom into 8 synodal areas, each of which would designate representatives to devote to the court. In the provincial synod of La Ferté-sous-Jouarre in April 1564, this system was followed through on, with the attempt to appoint a certain Poullailler or Concailler. It is unknown, both for Caen and La Ferté-sous-Jouarre, whether the chosen representatives ever went to the royal court.

The peripatetic nature of the court, starting in 1564, made the financial burden of such a project difficult to bear for the chosen representatives. Further, their role was already being partly fulfilled by the deputies that travelled to the court from the provinces to petition the king about the application of the edict of Amboise.

The Lyon Synod further declared that in cases of minor injury or offence, the matter could be dealt with through members of the consistory proffering a private opinion. In cases where a crime was public and liable to cause scandal, then they were to be called before the consistory for punishment. In cases of civil policing, the magistrate was to be adhered to. For matters of the church, ministers and synods would draw up rulings. A request for the king to tolerate the holding of Protestant synods was also to be made, but on the condition that it received the endorsement of the Protestant grandees at court.

At the Picardy provincial synod of La Ferté-sous-Jouarre, the matter of the Morély controversy was discussed, with the renegade Protestant thinker afforded a sympathetic reception. Assuming he undertook certain conditions it was agreed that he could be reconciled with the Calvinist church. Outside of this, various routine matters were considered, relating to the assignment of pastors and administrative queries about the conducting of rites. One man, a certain Pierre Denise, was dismissed from his ministry.

Denise was upset at his dismissal and took his revenge by sending an account of what 'had transpired at La Ferté' to someone with connections to the French court. In his telling, the synod was devoted to political matters and had concluded with the founding of a conspiracy. The proceedings had, as Denise told it, started with a letter from Beza warning of Catholic preparations to exterminate them, and urging them to build transnational ties with their coreligionists in the Netherlands. Several pastors were then to have denounced Catherine's government as a tyranny that robbed the kingdom of peace. Condé's chaplain was asked to intercede with the Prince in favour of the church. A letter from the prince de Porcien to the synod through the intermediary of his pastor is to have proffered his support for their scheming. They would raise money, and soldiers from Flanders. Come Pentecost, they would meet as an armed assembly. Kingdon dismisses there being much truth to Denise's report, while granting that the synod took place on the day he reported, and with the attendees he mentioned, Kingdon notes the unusual vocabulary Denise employs as being at odds with a report by a Protestant (in its use of the phrase "religion pretendue reformee" and "huguenots").

Reports of Denise's account spread internationally through the ambassadors at the French court, coming into the hands of cardinal Granvelle, king Philip's chief representative in the Netherlands, and lord Burghley, queen Elizabeth's chief minister in England.

Denise's charges could not go unanswered by the Protestants. The pastor Chandieu and some associates prepared a rebuttal. It first explained why the Protestants were holding synods to begin with, something that the edict of Amboise had not permitted them to do. Chandieu argued that Condé's wife, Éléonore de Roye had allowed this synod to go ahead. He further justified the concept of synods insofar as they combatted the possibility of heresy, clamped down on vice, and allowed for the maintenance of ecclesiastical discipline. The rebuttal then moved to attacks against Denise. He had always demonstrated himself unreliable and untrustworthy since insinuating himself into Protestant circles. He had killed a man with his own hands during the recent civil war, demonstrating his unsuitability to be a member of the clergy. The items that Denise stated they had discussed were false, Morély was the subject of their attentions. Calls had in truth gone out to the present pastors to admonish their congregations to obey the royal edicts. These claims were supported by the 'acts of the synod'. A more general plea about the loyalty and obedience of Protestants towards the crown was also made.

This defence of synods was similarly circulated, and found its way to the English court, along with Denise's account, and the 'acts of the synod'. This final document was felt to be of interest to the archbishop of Canterbury and bishop of London as an explanation of how the French synodal system operated.

At the national synod, which met in Verteuil in September 1567, the new order as concerned representatives to the court was not challenged. The advice of Beza to Coligny was simply affirmed by which the representative would consult with a churchman before taking an important decision. The Verteuil synod was not associated with the French Protestant regulation of 20 July.

===== Morély affair =====
In November 1566, Jeanne requested the presence of Coligny and the cardinal de Châtillon, along with several pastors, to investigate the Protestant minister Morély whom she had hired to tutor her son the prince de Béarn in August of that year. Several years previous (in an April 1562 publication), Morély had, according to Calvin, launched an attack on the organisation of the Calvinist church on the grounds of its aristocratic character. He favoured instead a more democratic church. For Morély there were three components to the church: the monarchy, represented by Christ; the aristocracy, represented by the consistory; and the democracy, represented by the faithful, who could elect pastors, monitor morality, and hand down excommunications. To become part of the 'democracy' one had to make a public confession of faith, and women, children, dishonest merchants, idol makers and others could not be part of this body. Where division existed among the faithful, it was not to be a majority decision, rather the Holy Spirit would guide the community towards consensus.

Daussy notes that Morély's ideas were not fundamentally different from those of other thinkers such as Pierre Viret. Beza, like Morély, believed in a mixed system. However for him, it was the aristocracy, embodied by the consistory, which should hold the power. Morély's innovation was to outline a concrete way by which the faithful might exercise sovereign power in concrete terms. Morély was condemned by a French national synod at Orléans in April 1562 for propagating 'evil and divisive works' which tended towards the confusion of the church, and then excommunicated by the Genevans in August 1563, with his works burned in the city a month later.

Morély was able to win powerful friends to his cause, such as the seigneur de Soubise, who he won over in the immediate wake of his Orléans condemnation. Beza, with the support of the pastor Chandieu was able to walk Soubise back from this support.

Morély himself walked back some of his views at the synods of La Ferté-sous-Jouarre in April 1564, and then that of Paris in February 1565. Despite this charm offensive, Geneva was not convinced to back off his excommunication.

In part thanks to these efforts, from the summer of 1565 Morély found new friends. These were some of the most powerful names in the Protestant French movement: Albret-Navarre and Coligny-Châtillon. When considering the sympathy of the Coligny-Châtillon to Morély, the historian Daussy dismisses the notion that it might have been due to a sympathy for the democratic elements. Rather he proposes that it derived from him presenting an alternate model to that of Geneva. The historians Kingdon and Metzger have argued that Calvinism's presbyterian-synodal model was so divorced from Catholicism that it frustrated the possibility of the church ever reuniting. The cardinal de Châtillon wished to maintain his benefices and the privileges that went along with them. Daussy notes that this position of the cardinal was by 1565 archaic, a relic of the 1561 colloquy of Poissy, which had become unfeasible with the outbreak of civil war in 1562. The definitive end to such a possibility of church reunification was delivered by the council of Trent. Coligny's motivations were somewhat different, Daussy argues that here it might have represented a desire to assert the power of the Calvinist nobility over the clergy which dominated the faith. Regardless of the veracity of this hypothesis, he dismisses an interest in a democratic church for Coligny. Further, he argues that in Coligny's tepid support of Morély, the divergence between the noble's pragmatic opinion on religious coexistence with Catholicism, and the clerical absolutism can be seen.

At a synod of July 1565, Coligny's chaplain read a letter before the assembly that contained the views of Morély. It became apparent on the occasion of this synod that Morély was close to the cardinal de Châtillon. Morély had established himself in the cardinal's diocese of Clermont-en-Beauvaisis and may have had contact with Châtillon stretching back to 1562. With the backing of the Châtillon brothers, the synod plead with Geneva to show mercy on Morély. Beza was not sympathetic to the request, believing Morély had not admitted to the gravity and extent of his errors.

At the direction of Geneva, the condemnation of Morély's work was renewed in a Parisian synod of December 1565. Morély appealed to the cardinal de Châtillon against this judgement. Through pastors in Châtillon-sur-Loing he vented his frustration at the Parisian synods actions to the synod of the Orléanais which met in March 1566 at Châtillon-sur-Loire. He decried Paris' actions as illegitimate and tyrannical.

Possibly alongside his brothers Coligny and Andelot he attempted to stop the publication of Chandieu's work from the national Paris synod that attacked Morély.

The cardinal de Châtillon's enthusiasm for Morély would begin to wane in April 1566, after the intervention of several ministers of Paris who worked to convince him of the thinker's unsavouriness.

Though Morély was a persona non grata, Jeanne, perhaps having seen that he was in good standing with the Coligny-Châtillon brothers hired Morély in August 1566 as the tutor for her son, the premier prince du sang, the prince de Béarn. This was either an act of defiance against the Calvinist church, or one of ignorance as to his reputation. Beza, seeing this as a major threat to the French Protestant movement, launched a large scale offensive.

Fortuitously for Beza's efforts, letters were discovered written by Morély in which he demeaned Theodore de Beza (describing him as the 'Jupiter of Lake Geneva'), des Gallars and various other pastors. In addition to this he declared that the retractions he had made in 1564 were a sham. In September, Nicolas des Gallars undertook an intervention with Châtillon and Coligny which definitively broke the former's attachment to the renegade Calvinist. He was aided in this by extracts of the letters of Morély, which he was able to send not only to the Coligny-Châtillon but also to the queen of Navarre. Des Gallars wrote to Beza on his successful effort with the Coligny-Châtillon brothers at the end of September. In explaining this about face for the Coligny-Châtillon brothers, Daussy highlights that they felt they had been deceived as to the true nature of Morély's beliefs. This at least was how the pastors writing to Geneva had framed their position. The historian ultimately finds this to be a convenient fiction and argues instead that the letters badly compromised Morély's reputation. Further, in a text written around the end of September, right at the moment of their divorce from Morély, the Châtillon brothers denounced the role of a certain pastor La Haye, who they alleged was 'using their name' in relation to the defence of Morély without their knowledge. This text also discussed their broader reasons to divest their support from Morély, expressing support for the unity of the Calvinist church. Innovation was to be deplored, with change brought about through the legitimate means of synod and conference. The Protestant party needed to remain united, and Morély represented the threat of schism. Without unity, even a status quo of the Protestant position in France was not tenable.

Beza himself wrote to the queen of Navarre. He entreated her pastor, du Rosier, to support his effort. In November, the Hebrew professor Matthieu Béroald was delegated by the church of Orléans with providing the queen of Navarre with more significant extracts of Morély's writing. Thus, with these letters translated into French and known to Jeanne, she summoned Coligny, Châtillon and various other Protestant nobles and pastors to determine Morély's guilt once and for all at Saint-Maur-des-Fossés on 23 November. Béroald delivered a denunciation of Morély before the assembled. On 27 November, it was concluded that, even if not guilty of heresy, Morély was guilty of defamation.

The queen of Navarre relinquished his services in a gentle manner. Writing to Beza on 6 December 1566, Jeanne expressed regret at the situation. She noted that her son had learned more in several months with Morély than he had in the seven years he had with his previous tutor La Gaucherie (who had taught by rote, denying the prince the ability to build foundations of learning). Daussy sees in this missive an explanation that for the queen of Navarre it was not a matter of Morély's novel beliefs on the church but rather his skill as a tutor that she had held onto him so long in the face of Geneva's opposition. Morély stayed for a time longer in the queen of Navarre's household, however when she departed the capital in late January 1567, Morély was not among her retainers. Going forward she would only appoint tutors of unimpeachable Calvinist orthodoxy. Coligny wrote to de Beza on 21 January on the matter of Morély. He explained that he had been deceived as to the true nature of his beliefs, and now well understood that the disease he represented in the church must be rooted out with the utmost vigour.

===== Radicalism =====
On the radical fringe of Protestant thought, the notion that obedience to the French king was a conditional one was explored. This became truer as the failure of the king to see the edict of Amboise rigorously applied was seen to be more apparent. For example, a work was published in Lyon that argued a king who neglected his duties, or acted like a tyrant, could be deposed. The importance of the king as a lawgiver was particularly stressed in this work. Philone voiced a similarly radical position in his play Josias. The king must act the good shepherd to his people, who would then be obliged to obey him. The sovereign owed his people justice, peace and (the true) religion. In return, the people owed their sovereign honour, tribute and obedience. A work published in Lyon in June 1563 proved the most provocative of the pieces of Protestant literature. Such was its inflammatory nature that it was condemned by the Protestant pastors of Lyon, and ordered burned by the Protestant governor of Lyon, the seigneur de Soubise. The death penalty was to be meted out to any found in possession of the work. While no copies survive, its contents are known through the defence Charles Dumoulin (perhaps its author) provided himself by refuting the work in writing. The Bible was used in this work to justify the use of force to oppose a monarch who sought to impose himself on his subjects' consciences. The wider Protestant community, keen to avoid appearances of sedition, needed to suppress such a work.

=== Famine ===
The years 1563 to 1567 were rocked by famine in France.

The winter of 1564-1565 was harsh and long, with snow falling as late as 24 June. This caused the destruction of grain, and the ruining of vines which possessed only a third of their typical yield. When the rains came, the banks of the rivers overflowed, creating a risk for those in the fields of drowning. Harvests were compromised in Paris and across the rest of the kingdom. In Paris, this had the effect of stimulating confessional hatreds.

Because of the harvest failure, tolls needed to be abolished between provinces to allow Paris to import grain from the less stricken provinces (such as Auvergne and Burgundy). The provinces of Burgundy, Champagne and Lorraine were less compromised by the absence of wheat thanks to their rye and barley crops. Thus, people flocked to Champagne to purchase their grains.

The poor, who could not afford fuel, were nevertheless obliged to keep themselves warm with fires.

During these years of hardship, in the villages of Champagne and Brie, a belief spread that the virgin Mary willed that Saturday afternoon also be set aside for rest, as opposed to being spent toiling in the fields. The young girl whose visions proposed this course was ordered to be burned alive by the cardinal de Lorraine.

Prices for wheat peaked in 1566 at around 400% of their 1562 cost.

Charles gave patent in 1566 for seven years to a certain Henri Rambault from Marseille for his new plow. The patent elaborated that the machine allowed for considerably more ease in the cultivation of land, in terms of speed and monetary investment.

=== Plague ===
Between 1562 and 1564, France also played host to a plague which tore through Languedoc, Provence, the Lyonnais, Burgundy, Champagne, the Île de France and Normandy. The west of the kingdom by contrast escaped fairly lightly. Trade routes proved the vectors for its passage.

== Provincial affairs ==
The years 1563 to 1567 witnessed the attempt of the French state to implement the edict of Amboise in the various provinces that made up the kingdom. There was resistance to this from both the Protestants and Catholics.

In the south-west of the country, around the lands of the queen of Navarre, there was particularly vigorous resistance to her implementation of a unitary Protestantism in her lands which manifested in both domestic and international conspiracy to depose her.

Chevallier argues that by 1567, the temperature of religious discord in the kingdom was beginning to cool. He sees a decline in violence against Protestants, and notes that Protestants had resigned themselves to the restrictions imposed on the edict of Amboise, and that Catholics had satisfied themselves with the restrictions imposed on Protestantism. He contrasts the state of affairs in France favourably with that of the Spanish Netherlands.

=== Parlements ===
The kingdom of France played host to eight parlements which served as the ultimate court of appeal for all civil and criminal cases. In addition to this responsibility, the parlements also had the responsibility to register royal edicts, something that had to be done before it was possible to enforce them in the jurisdiction of the parlement. The judges of the parlement had the right to register their opposition to the edicts they received in the form of a 'remonstrance'.

As the Crown lacked full control over the membership of the various parlements of the kingdom, Charles, and his close advisors, were sceptical of the bodies as a source of impartiality concerning the implementation of the peace edict. The chancellor L'Hôpital would admonish the bodies. Likewise, Charles offered exhortations to the parlements to render good justice and obey him.

==== Paris ====
The seigneur de Gonnor appeared before the parlement of Paris to make clear the imperative for the crown to make peace with the rebels. He highlighted the dominant position of the Protestants in various provinces (such as Languedoc and Dauphiné) and the poverty of the crown under the financial burdens. The parlement agreed in principle to go ahead with the registration of the edict of Amboise but wished to receive two princes du sang to their chambers for the process.

Under the oversight of the duc de Montpensier and cardinal de Bourbon, the parlement of Paris registered the edict of Amboise on 27 March. Their registration was undertaken on a provisional basis pending a church council, as well as king Charles' majority. The parlementaires hoped that when the king reached his majority, his opinions would hew more closely to their own. The historian Roelker notes that this registration was comparatively painless in comparison with their resistance to the 1562 edict of Saint-Germain, but cautions that this is to give a false impression, as the court unable to block the edict, looked instead to sabotage it. In the session following the registration, on 29 March, the parlement remonstrated against Catherine's toleration of non-Catholic courtiers. In their opinion such men could not be trusted to be reliable. It was the duty of the king not only to be Catholic himself, but to bring his kingdom towards a unified Catholic religion as it had once been before the troubles.

In response to the objections of the parlement of Paris to the edict of Amboise, the bishop of Valence delivered a harangue.

By orders of 7 April, the parlement of Paris instructed the conciergerie to make a list of those prisoners who did not participate in Catholic Easter religious observation. By the terms of a secret clause, those prisoners thus listed were to be cast into the dungeons, while those who demonstrated their Catholicity would be permitted to spend time in the conciergerie courtyard. Thus, even the freedom of conscience in the edict of Amboise was denied by the body. The parlement justified this on the grounds of endeavouring to avoid 'scandal and inconvenience', which the historian Diefendorf takes to mean the parlement had a concern for popular unrest, and a consciousness as to how insecure the courtyard of the conciergerie was. She finds merit in these considerations, while granting that it showed how limited the parlements adherence to the edict of Amboise was.

In the deliberations of 12 April, the parlement gave their opinion that the cities Protestant population should not return to the city until Easter had passed, the mercenaries had left France, and the situation had calmed. The city of Paris would follow the parlements lead on this.

The premier président of the parlement of Paris opined that they would maintain the pacification embodied in the edict of Amboise, but only if both sides maintained it. Thus, the peace was reduced to a negotiated contract whose validity could be abrogated by one side. The parlement complained, in April, that only Catholic Paris was being held to the terms of the edict of Amboise, while violence proliferated elsewhere.

The crown shot back on 24 April that their attempts at tutelage of the crown were inappropriate.

===== Returning members =====
The parlement of Paris strongly resisted the return of their former Protestant colleagues to their ranks. They planned to have those Protestants who refused to make an oath of Catholicity sell their offices. It took the intervention of the chancellor on 9 May 1563 to get them to accept those who had not sworn the oath of Catholicity they had instituted in June 1562 during the war. On 18 May, a delegation of présidents, gens du roi and councillors tried to elaborate on the prohibition of the return of absentee members, but they were forbidden from even deliberating the matter. On 22 May, the court remonstrated that a profession of faith over their membership was necessary for the preservation of law and order, without it the public would lose their respect for the parlement and their membership would become fragmented. It was highlighted that this was in accordance with the procedure of king Francis I, and with the 1562 edict of Saint-Germain which set out that the parlementaires should share the king's faith. Charles responded with an appeal to the needs of the state. The parlement again remonstrated on 25 May in favour of Catholicism being a necessary criterion for membership, as the implementation of Charles' justice required sharing the king's faith. They now sort to differentiate Protestants who had assumed arms in the civil war, from those who had absented themselves from a profession of faith. The court argued that the edict only applied to the former category. Those in the latter category had violated a rule of the court.

Finally defeated in the matter, the parlement resolved to ask each returning absentee whether they would swear an oath or not and make a record of those who declined to take it.

Roelker argues that at this time the parlementaire mainstream was composed of Catholics who believed in un roi, une foi, little approved of the crown's toleration of Protestantism, but were also uninterested in persecution. Thus for this caucus, they were happy to see an oath of religion waived for those who had previously absented themselves. When looking at the five présidents of the parlement, Roelker finds four willing to compromise. While the premier président de Thou had allowed debate on the return of the absentees in defiance of the king's explicitly instruction, he afforded the returnees equal privileges.

Of the thirty-one who had absented themselves from the June 1562 oath, four had either resigned or died in the intervening period, a further three were abroad serving as ambassadors. Fifteen had returned to the court by June 1563, with only two requesting that they be excused from the oath (Louis du Faur and Jacques Spifâme), the other nine would not return until the winter of 1563-4. For those who returned at this time, and took the oath, Roelker argues them as likely being Catholics, with some representation among liberal Catholics in the mould of Paul de Foix or Jean de Monluc. These nine were those who had transgressed most seriously, either holding Protestant assemblies in their homes, or serving in Condé's army during the civil war. Roelker sees these as the true Protestants of the court but notes that if they maintained their Protestantism after their return, it was as 'Nicodemites'.

The chancellor, L'Hôpital, maintained a strong line against the pretensions of the parlements. In a dressing down of November, he charged the parlementaires with improperly picking and choosing which ordinances they approved of, fostering wicked spirits and providing hope to those who wished to defy the edict of Amboise. Indeed, despite the edict, peace had not returned in many places, with crimes against the pacification continuing to be committed. In December 1563, he denied the possibility of there being legitimacy in opposing the king.

===== Disciplining the body =====
A Parisian parlementaire named Charles Dumoulin wrote a prominent treatise against the Tridentine decrees (recommendations of the council of Trent). He was subsequently arrested. This caused agitation among the parlementaires of the capital. The French crown at first endorsed his arrest, but subsequently reversed course after the entreaties of the queen of Navarre and duchess of Ferrara .

==== Rouen ====
The parlement of Rouen, much like that of Aix, Toulouse and Paris, objected to the return of their Protestant colleagues to the body. There was also an attempt to have wealthy zealous Catholic residents of the city buy seats in the parlement from the Protestants. The Spanish ambassador opined that this would in fact be a benefit to the Protestants, as they would profit from the sale, and could instead live in private security away from the wrath of the people. It required the intervention of the king, as it had in Toulouse, to bring about the readmission of the Protestant members of the body.

==== Dijon ====
A few days after the coming of peace, Catherine urged the seigneur de Tavannes to temper the virulence with which the parlement of Dijon was pursuing those charged with 'heresy'. She implored him to impart the fact that the parlement must understand religious prisoners needed to be restored to their liberty and property. The parlement would also attempt to institute the swearing of a confession of Catholic faith among its members.

At Tavannes' instigation, the parlement would instead entrust the councillor Bégat in May 1563 with illustrating the impossibility of religious coexistence to the crown. Bégat essayed a work entitled Remonstrances faictes au Roy de France par les Députez des Trois Estats du Pays et Duché de Bourgogne sur l'édit de pacification which was filled with historical examples. Christin finds Bégat's critique as a particularly notable one, standing out due to the dignity of the one delivering it, and the capacity in which he did so. Bégat would not be representing himself in his arguments, but rather the Catholic opposition of Burgundy. This allowed him to curtail the length of his opening remarks, that Burgundians loved peace as much as any other Frenchmen did, to a single sentence. As Bégat understood it, the problem was that Charles had afforded those who had split from the Catholic religion places of worship by his bringing of peace. This was impossible for the Estates of Burgundy to accept for several reasons. Firstly, and most importantly, it was not proper for a prince to have subjects of a religion other than his own. To do so, was to spite his own authority by allowing an alternate law in the kingdom to his. Far from defusing matters, it engendered hostilities between the rival faiths, that the king was left to be stuck between. Bégat dismissed the Swiss counter examples to this notion, by highlighting that those places were republics, whose law was given by the people. Similarly, in the Holy Roman Empire, the princes who had abandoned Catholicism enforced their alternative form of Christianity (be it Lutheranism or Calvinism) on their subjects, little caring for their personal opinions. In religious matters, neutrality did not exist, you were either with Christ or against him, according to Bégat. Further, the impossibility of religious coexistence had been demonstrated by the failures of the 1562 edict of Saint-Germain, which accomplished little more than spark civil war as far as he was concerned. Christin critiques this argument of Bégat's as being fundamentally circular, noting that the proposition one king, one law is stated but not proved. These principled objections Bégat levelled against the edict of Amboise formed only one of the four sections of his argument. Much of his argument was grounded in more concrete concerns about the difficulty of implementing toleration and contradictory royal policy. He argued for the dangers to urban municipal elections. They would become the playthings of confessional disputes as each faction sought to get their representatives onto the council. By winning electoral control of a council, a counterbalance against appointed or hereditary office holders might be sought. The existence of double elections in which alternate suites of candidates were elected would speak to this issue. Citing extensive ancient Greek examples, Bégat contrasted the edict of Amboise with them. Plato had spoken of the good of laws that bring together and unite a community. This edict by contrast, pushed together two differing confessions in a city and called it unity, but was more akin to marrying a wolf and a sheep. Bégat also argued that the Protestant's political goal was to reshape France in the manner of the Swiss cantons, to the disadvantage of the king's power and authority. Carroll describes Bégat's prognostications of the troubles that were to derive from toleration of multiple faiths as being based on historical precedents for the situation, and as proving to be prescient of the problems that would plague the peace.

In response to Bégat's case, a refutation was authored, Apologie de l'Edit du Roy sur la pacification de son Royaume, contre les Remonstrances des estats de Bourgogne. It argued that the edict of Amboise was a product of necessity, and that the granting of permission for Protestant worship should not be equated with approval of the faith, it was rather a measure to avoid greater evils. Finally, that toleration would ultimately be revoked. Bégat shot back in turn with the work Response pour les Deputez des trois estats du Pays de Bourgogne in which he argued that toleration was contrary to the crown's interests and would make it more challenging for it to exercise its authority.

By lettres de jussion of 20 May, Charles ordered the Dijon parlement to register the edict of Amboise immediately and without modification, and to provide the benefits of the peace to those entitled to them. They were also to permit back into their ranks any Protestant members of the court that had been expelled.

On 19 June 1563, the parlement of Dijon capitulated to the crown and registered the edict of Amboise. They noted that it was done under protest, at the express command of Catherine and Charles, and only after they had made their objections known to Charles several times. At the end of the edict of Amboise, they added an extra clause by which they declared that Protestantism was still illegal in the jurisdiction of their parlement, thereby making their registration meaningless. It would not be until the king himself appeared before the parlement of Dijon in May 1564, that the edict was registered without amendment.

==== Aix ====
Not only did the parlement of Aix refuse to register the edict of Amboise, but they re-enacted a 1562 edict proclaiming the sole religion in their jurisdiction to be Catholicism. Vielleville, who had arrived in Aix, attempted to see the militantly Catholic parlement register the edict of Amboise on 28 July. He failed. Returning to Aix in September 1563, furthest negotiations saw him succeed in seeing the edict of Amboise registered.

Despite having conceded to the edict of Amboise, the parlement of Aix refused to countenance the return to the body of their Protestant colleagues and maintained the necessity that its members swear to their Catholicity. Frustrated with the obstinacy of the parlement of Aix, over the return of their Protestant members, the parlement was suspended in March 1564 (on the basis of royal orders from November 1563). The court was replaced the following month by a provisional council comprising a group of Parisian parlementaires, headed by a certain Bernard Prévost, the sieur de Morsang. Morsang was so vigorous in his prosecution of unrepentant Catholics, that several thousand of them sought protection in the papal exclave of the Comtat-Venaissin.

The replacement officials would continue in their charges until December 1564. After the parlement was restated, some of the imported officials would continue to serve in the body for months more.

==== Bordeaux ====
The parlement of Bordeaux saw the registration of the edict of Amboise thanks to the efforts of the premier président Jacques-Benoît Lagebâton. This registration was made over the objections of many of his colleagues, who would later hound him from his office.

==== Toulouse ====
The parlement of Toulouse provisionally registered the edict of Amboise on 15 April. It would not however be until the arrival of the seigneur de Damville, who replaced his father as governor of Languedoc, that the parlement fully registered the peace on 21 July.

The parlement resisted the readmission of the 22 councillors they had expelled in October 1562. It required the intervention of Charles himself to see their return.

The parlement of Toulouse came in for chastisement from Charles, alongside the capitouls and sénéchal of the city in letter of 14 July 1563. The king scolded them for failing to bring about the disarmament of the populace, the ramparts were still being guarded, and those who refused to do so were subject to significant constraints. The capitouls were further reproached in October 1563 for allowing the bourgeois of Toulouse to maintain themselves at arms at the gates of the city.

Around May 1567, the parlement of Toulouse oversaw the burning of Protestant books, and the confiscation of the property of dead Protestants to compensate the Catholic victims of the 1562 troubles. It was taken in Paris that the king approved of this measure.

=== Enforcement mechanisms of the peace ===
Charles would resolve to deny the parlements cognisance of cases relating to the application of the edict of Amboise and maintenance of peace. They had proved themselves unfit for purpose by their hostilities to the edict, and their discrimination against their own Protestant membership. Thus the king instead looked to the baillis, sénéchaux, judges of the présidiaux courts and prévôts des maréchaux as enforcers of the peace. These figures would hand down sentences as if they were members of the sovereign courts (i.e. parlements).

The king looked to the governors of the provinces, appointed from among the upper rungs of the nobility to play a role in the administration of peace. Thus, on 3 May 1563, the governors and lieutenant-generals of the provinces were ordered to take the lead on the implementation of the peace. Looking to establish an unrefusable authority, Charles turned to the maréchaux to undertake tours of inspection. On 6 May the maréchal de Montmorency was ordered to conduct a tour of inspection of his government of the Île de France. On 8 May, the maréchal de Vielleville was granted the authority of lieutenancy over the provinces of the Lyonnais, Beaujolais, Provence and Forez. Vielleville had initially been delegated responsibility over the western provinces, but he protested that he had too many ties in Maine, Brittany and Anjou to be an impartial justice. The maréchal de Bourdillon was entrusted with the western provinces in his stead.

==== Commissioners ====
In a further move to sideline the parlements at large, Charles looked to establish a system of commissioners, drawn from among the councillors of the parlements (chiefly that of Paris) and the maîtres des requêtes of his own household. While the crown had experimented with commissioners previously, this would be the first time such a program was employed nationally. These appointments were undertaken via letters of commission, the first of which was dated 18 June 1563. The commissioners' responsibilities were spelled out in their letters of commission: they were to enforce the peace where it was not yet implemented, and impose justice on those who defied the peace. Local authorities would assist them in their charges, and they would have their commission registered with the local parlement, présidial court or municipal authority. These handpicked individuals would be dispatched in groups of two to each province. As a sop to the Lorraine-Guise family, Champagne was exempted from receiving commissioners. In total, there were twenty-eight of these commissioners. The Historian Roberts' disputes this, arguing the list of twenty-eight, which assigned two men to each of fourteen regions (which were sometimes multiple provinces) reflected more a notice of intent than an actual commission. Of the twenty-eight listed men, only thirteen of these nominees would go out into the provinces.

The work of being a commissioner required a great deal of travel, the historian Foa estimates that the average commission involved 1,500 to 2,200 kilometres of horseback travel over a period of several months. In their work, the commissioners were subjected to intimidatory threats. For example, the maréchal de Biron would record that the commissioners in Provence, and those they sought evidence from, were threatened.

The mandate given to these commissioners was an extensive one. For example, that provided to Gabriel Myron and Michel Quelin in June 1563. They were authorised to examine the implementation of the peace, bring about those parts of it which had not yet been implemented, free prisoners who had been amnestied by the edict but not yet released, return those dispossessed to their property and offices (only mandating oaths from them that existed before the troubles, and even this excluding obligatory professions of Catholicity). They would also choose the sites of Protestant worship as allocated by the edict of Amboise and examine the compliance of local officials with the edict. In instances where they came across ambiguities, they were to refer these matters up to Charles to rule upon.

The letters of commission stressed that the peace was a god given one, that Charles had ensured was published and established across the kingdom.

The commissioners often struggled to impose their arbitration. The local powers they encountered jealously guarded their prerogatives. The commissioners were Nobles of the Robe (administrative nobles), who were working towards a novel style of legal government at the behest of the chancellor L'Hôpital. This approach to administration clashed with that of the great nobility (Nobles of the Sword (whose families historic service to the crown was military), a group that fancied for itself a role (or even a right to a monopoly) in the governing of the kingdom's affairs and was therefore ill inclined to give way to the authority of Robe nobles.

Roberts places the central issue of the peace edict that the commissioners would have to wrestle with as concerning sites of worship. She contrasts the difficulty of this process for restoring Catholic worship in places it had been stopped (as churches could be handed back), and the difficulty of restoring Protestant worship where it had been stopped (as this required the determination of a new site for the worship). The edict of Amboise specified the seventy-six designated towns afforded by the edict of Amboise (one location in each bailliage or sénéchaussée, but this was not the totality of locations in which Protestant worship was to be permitted, nor did it describe the specific location in that place.

Protestant sites of worship were often the subject of controversy, and those selected deemed unacceptable to the Protestants due to the great distances involved in travelling to them. The sites were sometimes pushed away from the urban centres to remote rural places. These distant journeys for worship made the Protestants easy pickings for thieves and brigands, exposed them to more hostile Catholic peasants (who had less exposure to Protestantism), and were challenging for the more vulnerable both due to the distance and the climate. In their appeals concerning the sites of worship, Protestants emphasised far away locations would force them to return to clandestine worship, which would be a security risk. Catholics meanwhile argued that there were military and economic risks to establishing the Protestants in religious houses too close to major centres. Thus, worship on noble estates was often the easier solution.

The commissioners would not be alone in overseeing enforcement. The earlier mandates afforded to the maréchaux allowed for collaboration. The maréchal de Montmorency would be involved in the implementation in Paris, the wider Île de France, Picardy, Normandy, Champagne, the Orléanais and Berry, starting in Picardy where he was to see the non-frontier towns disarmed and the recognition of the royal edicts (including the king's majority); the maréchal de Bourdillon held purview over Touraine, Anjou, Maine, Poitou, parts of Brittany, and lower-Normandy; and the maréchal de Vielleville through the Lyonnais, Dauphiné, Provence (which included the papal territory of Comtat Venaissin) and Languedoc starting in Lyon where there was much business to handle. In the south, Vielleville would be responsible for seeing the Protestants withdraw from their strongpoints and ecclesiastical property. He would be praised by Protestants and Catholics alike for his moderation. Subsequently, the maréchal de Vielleville would receive responsibility also for pacification in Poitou and the pays Messin where he enjoyed personal influence. Charles elaborated on the tours of his three maréchaux around 20 April 1564. Roberts argues that the maréchaux were spread so thin by these responsibilities that they often became overstretched. For example, the maréchal de Montmorency had his hands full with Paris alone, let alone the provinces of the North and East of the kingdom. Thus, the provincial governors still had an important role to play. In Brittany and Poitou it would be to the governors that the crown primarily looked, as they had already demonstrated their dependability. Given the partisan nature of many local governors in balancing local security and toleration for Protestantism, the maréchaux would in some instances have to play the role of regulators of the authorities. In many places, local officials followed a policy of malicious compliance. Adhering tightly to the letter of the law to declare any act of their religious adversary not specifically mentioned and condoned in the law to be prosecutable. While allowing for this, Christin concedes that violence against religious minorities was somewhat reduced by the edict of Amboise.

The decentralised existence of the commissioner system, the parlements and the présidiaux courts, all as competing forms of authority, meant that a stable interpretation and case law was not founded. As such, the role of the king to intervene and clarify became necessary.

The commissioners generated a significant workload for the royal council in the years 1563-1566, which met several times a week. In each meeting of the council, several cases would be dealt with, featuring a handful of the commissioners. On over twenty-seven occasions, the matter of sites of worship was discussed. Also up for discussion, the return of seized property and compensation to the widows of murder victims. Reports from the commissioners as to the status of their commission, and the challenges the execution of their mandate had faced (such as by defiant local officials), were common. The council was stacked with maîtres des requêtes, from among whose number many commissioners had been drawn, thereby increasing the likelihood the commissioners enjoyed a sympathetic reception. On occasion, the council would order one of their number to head into the provinces to assess the situation themselves. In some instances, cases were kicked up to the royal council as a way of circumventing the local commissioners, and this occasioned rebuke from the council in December 1563.

The missions of the commissioners were temporary, most of them wrapping up by the end of 1563 or start of 1564. The average duration of a commissioner's assignment in the provinces for the edict of Amboise was seven months.

Even after the end of the commissioners mission, Charles would continue to prohibit the involvement of the parlements in the judging of cases relating to the edict of Amboise. By letters patent of 13 April 1565, matters were to be referred to the présidiaux courts, any problems in this process could then be kicked up to the conseil privé itself.

==== Return of the parlements ====
By January 1566, the weight of cases relating to the edict of Amboise that the crown was dealing with had become too much to bear, and cognisance of such cases was opened back up to the provincial parlements. The commissioners had by this time been recalled to the capital, and it was hoped neutral chambers in the parlements would assume the burden they had shouldered. The use of such chambers was a compromise to the Protestants, who had always opposed parlementaire jurisdiction over cases relating to their religion. It would only be in February 1566, that the parlement of Paris was able to secure jurisdiction over cases relating to the edict of Amboise. Charles specified that in cases where they encountered ambiguity in the peace, they were to refer the matter to him.

== Foreign policy ==
The years of internal peace saw various developments in France's foreign relations. With England, the war continued into 1564, when it was concluded by the treaty of Troyes in April. By the terms of this treaty, France's control of Calais was affirmed. Over the following years, England would make further efforts to secure the return of the city without success. Relations with Spain were severely tested by the French colonial expansion in Florida. In late 1565, the Spanish sent an expedition which destroyed this colony, and French protestations concerning the incident were rebuffed. Further conflict with Spain was to be found in the quarrel over precedence in the papal court, the revolt in Corsica, as well as matters relating to the Ottoman Empire, and the French religious policy. France involved itself in negotiations between Denmark and Sweden concerning their conflict in 1565. In the Holy Roman Empire, France attempted to rebuff Imperial efforts to be restored to control of the Three Bishoprics. French colonial efforts down the African coast would end in diplomatic embarrassment at Funchal.

At this time, France enjoyed the positive effect of a French princess at the Spanish court, Élisabeth, who acted as a conduit for Catherine's relations with Philip. Catherine had long held a project of securing a meeting between the two crowns, and achieved a partial success when Philip consented for Élisabeth to meet with her brother and mother in 1565. At the subsequent interview of Bayonne, the Spanish pressed for a change in direction in French religious policy, while Catherine looked to arrange marriage alliances without success. Though little came of the meeting, it was to the alarm of the Protestants, who had been excluded from it. Further Protestant alarm came as the situation in the Spanish Netherlands deteriorated in late 1566, with the duke of Alba marching along the kingdom's frontier to suppress the troubles in the northern territory.

== Grand tour of the kingdom ==
In March 1564, the royal court left the château de Fontainebleau for a tour of the kingdom which would last the next two years. By means of this tour, the king would be shown off to his subjects, a moderate bloc of nobles won to the royal party and away from the factions, order re-established in the kingdom, and balance established between the Catholic and Protestant populations of France. Along the way, the king visited the various parlements of the kingdom, where he stressed his desire for peace and his interest in enforcing the edict of Amboise.

From Fontainebleau, the court first went east, arriving at Bar-le-Duc on the frontier before pivoting southwards down to Dijon. The river Saône was followed southwards to Provence, with the court stopping at Lyon and Avignon among other places. In Provence, the court visited the capital of Aix, before turning westwards, tracing the southern coast of the kingdom before making for Toulouse. From Toulouse up to Bordeaux in the west, then south to Bayonne. The court then went north again, up to Brittany where Nantes was visited. Finally, the court pivoted eastwards, culminating in a stay at Moulins.

The tour of the kingdom was also an occasion for diplomatic summits, chief among which was a meeting between Charles and Catherine, and Catherine's daughter Élisabeth at Bayonne in June 1565. With Élisabeth for the occasion was the duke of Alba, with whom Catherine conducted talks. While Catherine hoped to achieve marriages from the discussions, the Spanish hoped to see the abrogation of the French pacification edicts, and a joint war against heresy. Alba demurred on the possibility of marriages, and Catherine offered little in the way of satisfaction to the duke of Alba.

Throughout the tour, the crown had received petitions from discontented Protestants and Catholics, who complained of violations of the edict of Amboise committed by the other religion.

== Back from the tour ==
=== Court in Paris ===
Having concluded its tour of the kingdom, the court would reside for a while at the royal château de Saint-Maur in May. Around this time, Álava reports in his despatch of 25 May of a confrontation between Charles and the Protestant seigneur d'Andelot. In his telling, Andelot approached the king, to seek the right to have Protestant worship conducted in certain suburbs of Paris. Charles rebuffed this, stating that he wished to leave Paris to the Catholics. This vexed Andelot, who argued that it was unwise to coerce consciences, and there was a risk by this policy of bringing about considerable defiance that would be difficult for Charles to punish. Charles assured him that those who defied the royal policy would be subject to justice. After this episode, the Lorraine-Guise family made their departure from court, without taking leave of the king. Catherine, worked to see the cardinal de Lorraine stay behind, inviting him to lunch with her. Álava, deplored the favour the constable de Montmorency, his sons, and his Protestant nephews (among whom was Andelot) were in at court. Contrasting this with the absence from court of the Lorraine-Guise. Only the cardinal de Lorraine would remain at court.

On 10 May, the royal family departed from the château de Saint-Maur to dine at the residence of Marie-Catherine de Pierrevive, who had married into the Italian Gondi family. One of the sons of this marriage, Albert de Gondi had followed the French court through part of the recent tour of the kingdom. He would go on to enjoy a prominent role at court and in the government in the coming years.

The duc and duchesse de Lorraine were due to arrive in the capital on 13 May according to the Spanish ambassador Álava.

On 17 May, Charles reaffirmed the edict of Amboise, as well as the decisions promulgated in Moulins. This did not stop Catherine from offering reassurances to the Spanish ambassador.

Catherine was concerned to see so many great nobles with their trains descending upon Paris. She therefore, around 25 May sent four companies of the king's guard ahead of the king's arrival, with orders for the maréchal de Montmorency to order the retirement from the city of those not in the ordinary household of the nobles. Around 29 May, Montmorency attempted to protest against this measure, arguing Catherine was interfering with his authority, but this challenge was not brooked. Charles ordered the seigneur de Lanssac and baron de La Garde to execute the policy, since the maréchal would not.

The political temperature in Paris was not as tense as it might have been anticipated to be.

Taking advantage of the edict of Amboise's provisions, the queen of Navarre, prince de Condé and duchess of Ferrara all undertook Protestant services in their apartments in the capital. This occasioned protest from Álava and the cardinal de Bourbon, who charged the queen of Navarre with violating the king's edicts.

At this time, Jeanne, the queen of Navarre, was consumed by a lawsuit she was undertaking with the cardinal de Bourbon over the rights to succession concerning the Bourbon-Vendôme inheritance. The cardinal had renounced his rights to the succession on the occasion of the queen of Navarre's marriage to Antoine de Bourbon, but now looked to void this. To avoid scandal, the lawsuit was moved to the royal council. Catherine, little desirous to support the cardinal de Bourbon on account of his proximity to the cardinal de Lorraine, leant her support to Jeanne in this matter.

Writing to the prince de Porcien, her nephew, Jeanne reprimanded him for paying credence by his behaviour to the rumours that their enemies were acting with hostility towards them. He must behave in such a way as he could not be reproached.

The king and his mother would take the opportunity of being in Paris to walk the streets in disguise.

The admiral de Coligny took Charles to a Protestant bookshop where the king was presented with a work illuminated with gold concerning the government of the kingdom. Champion notes that the text was perhaps a shortened version of De Regimine Principum and was not a Protestant work. Charles received the piece with much pleasure.

A Protestant minister of Orléans was arrested around this time for publishing a work, entitled Libertate Ecclesiæ which suggested that in instances where a sovereign suppressed liberty of conscience, this was a case of tyranny and could be met with tyrannicide. Andelot was among those who called for the minister's release. Catherine resolved to take the measure of Álava's opinion on the issue but received only a sarcastic endorsement of freeing the man.

Álava further related that Catherine kept Anjou with her at mealtimes on occasion due to the violence that was inflicted on the prince by his elder brother, the king, who felt he was too soft. Similarly, thinking his brother desired to take his crown, Charles began to refuse to play tennis with Anjou, fleeing from the court when the possibility presented itself. The Venetian ambassador reported that after Anjou defied an edict on dress that the king had issued, Charles refused to speak with his brother.

On 1 June, the papal nuncio to France, Michele Della Torre, requested of the crown the restoration of religious unity in the kingdom of France and the publication of the Tridentine decrees.

Charles, and his brother Anjou amused themselves in idle pleasures. The two men went in disguise to attend the fair of Saint-Denis during June.

During July, Charles, Catherine, the ducs d'Alençon and d'Anjou, and their sister Marguerite participated in a religious procession from the abbey of Montagne-Sainte-Geneviève to the Notre Dame in Paris. It was hoped by this means to bring an end to the incessant rains that plagued the moment. In that same month, the duc and duchesse de Lorraine visited the French capital, improving the mood in the city.

=== Tour of Normandy ===
Having secretly agreed with the Spanish ambassador to cancel a planned visit to the Picard frontier to inspect the fortifications, Catherine instead announced an excursion of the court to château d'Écouen, château de Chantilly, Villers-Cotterêts and then up to Gaillon in Normandy where they would witness the baptism of the son of the duc de Longueville.

On 27 July, the court prepared to make for Chantilly. This was announced to the duc de Nemours in a letter in which the prince was informed that after frequenting Chantilly, the court hoped to move on to Nanteuil, where Anne d'Este had a fine house. At this same moment, the admiral de Coligny, and those associated with him, held court at the residence of the queen of Navarre in Paris. Their meeting related to the recent election of a Catholic prévôt des marchands. The Châtillon were in confusion about the actions of the royal family. They could not imagine why, at a time like this, the French crown was neglecting the Picard border. If they would not go, then perhaps the prince de Condé could conduct the border inspection, as he was deemed to be suitable.

Around this time, Catherine increased the size of the royal pensions granted to the prince de Condé, the admiral de Coligny, and the constable de Montmorency.

Rumours of a Protestant plot swirled in August 1566 while the king was in Normandy. At this time, in addition to many Protestant ministers, the cream of the Protestant nobility was to be found gathered in the capital. The prince de Condé, the admiral de Coligny, the prince de Porcien, the comte de La Rochefoucauld and the comte de Gramont were all gathered there. Among the nobles in the capital, the comte de Montgommery, who according to an English report of 21 August 'swaggered around the capital with his men'. Álava suggested the Protestant leadership had ill intentions for the king and his mother. This notion amused Catherine. Nevertheless, both she and Charles ordered Coligny to decamp from Paris. The election of the Catholic prévôt des marchands was also confirmed. The court's travel to Laon in August earned them rebuke from Álava, who reminded them of their promise not to visit the Picard frontier. This rebuke was in turn shot down, Catherine stating that they had only travelled there to meet with the cardinal de Lorraine. The lack of trust in them shown by the Spanish ambassador was rebuked. She further outlined that the court would arrive in Gaillon by 15 September. While in Laon in August, Charles met with a woman who was supposed to have been subject to a Satanic possession, before being exorcised of the demons. From Laon, he travelled to Gaillon. Faced with a possible Protestant plot in the capital, Charles decided to return to terminate his Norman trip and return to Paris, writing to the constable de Montmorency to explain his decision to do so from Gaillon on 27 September. He noted that he would be coming to Saint-Maur for 15 October, and invited the constable de Montmorency to join with him there, so that he might take advantage of the elderly man's wisdom. The meeting of the Protestant grandees dispersed.

During August 1566, a Protestant revolt erupted in the Spanish Netherlands. Philip resolved to send an army north to the provinces, tracing the eastern edge of France, under the command of the duke of Alba. This alarmed both Protestants and Catholics in France. Charles hired 6,000 additional Swiss mercenaries to supplement his personal guard, creating fears among the Protestants that there was a secret plot to redirect the duke of Alba's army from the Spanish Road and into France so that the French Protestants might be crushed.

Coligny departed from Paris for Écouen, in the hopes of meeting with his uncle, the constable de Montmorency.

By 15 October, the French court was back at Saint-Maur and received the Spanish ambassador Álava.

== Slide to war ==
Around the terminus of 1566, the queen of Navarre became embroiled in trouble with the French crown due to the public preaching her ministers undertook in Paris. For the Catholics this was a scandalous violation of the king's edicts, and Charles responded by attempting to have the offending pastor arrested and hanged. Around 26 January 1567, the queen of Navarre, her son the prince de Béarn, the prince de Condé, the admiral de Coligny all made their departure from court. Though the queen of Navarre had permission from the court to make for La Flêche, she instead fled south to her own lands without leave. Safely away from the court, the prince de Béarn declared himself a Protestant once more. Around the time of the queen of Navarre's flight from court, the seigneur de Monluc became aware of Protestant war plans.

During February, Catherine wrote to the duc d'Uzès to raise concerns about the actions of his younger brothers, the baron d'Acier, and Galiot de Crussol who were said to be raising and moving troops. Catherine explained that she knew they would not act that way if Uzès was present, but that he should write to them to make it clear they were defying the king's will by their actions.

In March 1567, a Spanish spy in Bordeaux reported to king Philip II (via the duke of Medinaceli viceroy of Navarre) on Protestant war preparations. At the place of Langon, 2,500 pikes had been unloaded, imported from Bilbao (1,500), Tonneins (500) and Mauléon-de-Soule (500) before being hidden in the sands. On 5 April, a certain Josepe de Guevara was appraised that arquebuses, muskets and cuirasses had been supplemented to the pikes, with the combined weapon haul being moved to the Bordeaux arsenal.

At some point in the spring of 1567, Catherine held a secret meeting with the Protestant leader de Beza. With fears of both a Protestant and a Catholic uprising haunting the crown, Catherine hoped to invite both the Châtillon/Condé party and the Lorraine-Guise to court for further reconciliation efforts between them. The Lorraine-Guise only appeared with great reluctance. Coligny refused to return to court, though Condé took up the invite. Haan argues this reconciliation effort by Catherine actually poisoned relations further.

Montmorency, who had retired from court in anger over not being granted the monetary spoils of confiscations made by the crown, was summoned to return by Catherine in March 1567. She hoped that he might serve as a counterweight to the hawkish prince de Condé. The constable refused the summons on the grounds of 'illness'. On 20 April, orders were sent out for all the members of the court to assemble at Fontainebleau. Montmorency stayed obstinate in his refusal. Catherine offered Montmorency 30,000 livres for his travel expenses, and his eldest son, the maréchal de Montmorency, endeavoured to see his father come to court. Montmorency resisted, instead sending the seigneur de Lanssac in his place. No sooner was this decision made than abandoned, and Montmorency made his way to join with the court.

In March 1567, a Spanish agent reported to Philip that in the hopes of frustrating a Spanish passage to Flanders, a Protestant conspiracy in Bordeaux had attempted to assassinate the commander of the château du Ha, as well as one of the cities jurats. Meanwhile in Narbonne and Avignon the Protestants had attempted to seize the cities, only to have their conspiracies frustrated, with 500 Protestants killed in the effort.

The Venetian ambassador's report of 18 April 1567 covered the recent death of the maréchal de Bourdillon. In his report, he mentioned a rumour that the maréchal was the victim of a Protestant poisoning.

The duc d'Aumale, visited Álava (the Spanish ambassador in France) under cover of night, to ask if it were true that the duke of Alba would be passing by the French border with 10,000 veteran soldiers. After Alba arrived in the Spanish Netherlands, Aumale would send him an emissary. Both he and the cardinal de Lorraine overflowed with praise for the duke of Alba and Álava. Álava was critical of the cardinal de Lorraine, dismissing him as a loudmouth in his letter of 19 April to Philip. Philip responded on 4 May praising the cardinal de Lorraine as wise, and of worthy opinion.

On 1 May 1567, concerned that the gendarmerie was understrength, Charles ordered that all captains of the compagnies (companies) to hold a review on 1 June, while being in attendance themselves. The king hoped this would ensure the compagnies were best able to serve him.

On 5 May 1567, the prince de Porcien died, closely following the death of the seigneur de Soubise, both men having been leading Protestants. Soubise had faded after a long illness. Porcien meanwhile, was young and healthy, and therefore contemporary suspicions fell on him being the victim of a poisoning by infused gloves. This fear was amplified by the arrest the previous year of a would-be assassin, who claimed he was to poison Porcien on the orders of the cardinal de Lorraine. The cardinal de Lorraine did not mourn the death of the prince de Porcien, remarking that it would be a good thing for Christendom if more men of his disposition met the same fate. For her part, the duchesse de Nemours was keen to see her son, the duc de Guise, married to Porcien's widow, Catherine de Clèves. Such a marriage was opposed by the uncles of the duc, the cardinal de Lorraine and duc d'Aumale.

The Venetian ambassador reports on 16 May concerning the baptism of Condé's first son by his second wife at the château de Vallery. Despite the lavish expenses devoted to the ceremony, and Champion expects a royal promise, Charles refused to attend the baptism. He was little interested in making an appearance at a Protestant ceremony, and the admiral de Coligny attended in his stead. This was despite the boy having been given the name Charles in his honour.

According to the Spanish ambassador's report of 6 May, to the delight of the constable de Montmorency, his son, the maréchal de Montmorency made a show of his Catholic orthodoxy around this time. He undertook confession and received communion.

Around the end of May, the court spent eight days in Paris. On 29 May, Charles attended a procession of the blessed sacrament alongside Catherine. From Paris, the court planned to go first to Saint-Germain, then Villers-Cotterêts and (the Venetian ambassador guessed) also conducted a tour of the border province of Picardy. Leaving Paris on 3 June, instead of going to Saint-Germain as planned, the court instead made for the residence of the Catholic cardinal de Bourbon at Gaillon.

The Spanish ambassador Álava, reported back to his king during May and June that there was great hostility to be found between Charles and his brother the duc d'Anjou. According to his reports, Anjou avoided playing tennis with the king, meanwhile Charles raged at his mother's relative favour towards his younger brother.

In June, the seigneur d'Andelot came to Paris, to undertake recruitment for his bands.

Having accepted Catherine's invitation, Condé arrived at court in the midst of this international crisis on 3 July. The historian Champion highlights that around this time he was heavily indebted, being around 100,000 écus in the red. His arrival was the occasion for a royal snub. Alongside the queen mother, he had headed out to meet with the king, who was hunting. Upon coming across the king, the latter greeted his mother and ignored Condé. Catherine prompted her son to recognise the presence of Condé, but instead he greeted his mother again and then went back to hunting preparations.

Soon after Condé, the admiral de Coligny arrived at court on 6 July. The Venetian ambassador did not see him likely to remain there long, as he was held in disdain by Charles. Correro reported that as Charles aged, he was beginning to despise Protestants in general, and Catherine was forced to intercede with her son in the hope of restraining his hatred.

On 7 July, the court made for the château de Saint-Maur, and they would tarry here for two days, before heading on to first Chantilly and then Écouen.

According to the Spanish ambassador's report of 13 July, to some disquiet, Condé took the initiative in royal council on 10 July by making a promise to raise 5,000 cavalrymen within a few days. The authority under which he would raise, and command troops was questionable. On the one hand these might be raised for the good of the kingdom, on the other, for his own personal advancement. Though some found this proposal agreeable, others on the royal council were unsettled.

At the prompting of the royal council, Anjou confronted Condé in the gallery of the château. With him for this menace laden meeting were archers from the royal guard and several 'great lords'. The contemporary historian Brantôme was a witness to the confrontation. The duc d'Anjou noted that while Condé may not have respect for Charles or Catherine he might perhaps show it to him, the king's lieutenant-général. He chided the prince for suggesting it was his right to raise horsemen on his own initiative. The prince asserted to Condé that this was a matter so close to royal power that it was beyond even the constable to do such a thing, the initiative for such an act being in Anjou's hands. Anjou called on Condé to return to his company of men-at-arms and cause no further trouble. As Anjou addressed the prince, in words that Brantôme was too distant to make out, he is to have played with his sword, and toyed with his dagger. Some other historians, such as Garrisson, Labourdette, Jouanna, Daussy and Carpi record this meeting differently, suggesting the dispute was over Condé's interest in the title of lieutenant-general should war break out. Condé argued that the title belonged to the premier prince du sang, and given the prince de Béarn's young age, it should be his to hold on an interim basis. Anjou is to have rebuffed Condé arguing such a title would rightly belong in his hands.

The Spanish ambassador was greatly impressed by Anjou's approach, lauding him as a leader of the Catholic party. In Pernot's estimation, in transcribing Anjou's speech to the Spanish king, Álava likely embellished the confrontation.

Condé protested that no service other than that given towards the king was in his mind by his proposal. He spoke softly in response to the hot words that Anjou had delivered against him. Brantôme saw the duc d'Anjou as possessing a particular hatred of Condé. Jouanna emphasises the gravity of this affront that the duc d'Anjou had delivered to Condé. Chevallier notes that Condé was thirty-seven, had a glowing military career, and enjoyed popularity with the soldiery. Anjou by contrast was only sixteen years old. Humiliated by his treatment at the hands of the king's brother, and, according to the historian Crété, fearful for his life, the day that followed, 11 July, he requested leave of the court, stating it was clear his services were not required and departed. Having left court, he made for the château de Vallery, a property of his. Labourdette describes this confrontation with Anjou as a key cause of Condé's decision to enter rebellion against the crown.

That same day, 11 July, the court arrived at the château d'Écouen, a residence belonging to Montmorency. Álava made an appearance here, to demand the adoption of the resolutions of the council of Trent. During this period, he channelled the aggressive diplomatic posturing of his predecessor, Chantonnay. His diplomatic offensive paralleled the military offensive Spain was undertaking against the rebellion in the Spanish Netherlands simultaneously. Charles and Catherine rebuffed the Spanish ambassador on this, noting that they abided by the terms of the Tridentine decrees as concerned suspect bishops, but reserved the right in their own house to follow their own customs. While Catherine represented a defiant attitude towards Álava, the duc de Montmorency employed a softer touch, giving the ambassador a tour of his château.

The court would spend tarry for ten days at Écouen. The pause here was to be the occasion for the marriage of the constable de Montmorency's youngest daughter Marie to marry the Gascon seigneur Candalle. The constable would however delay the affair until August, so that the Lorraine-Guise family might attend.

The Spanish ambassador Álava, in July wrote to king Philip. He opined that surely Charles was now old enough to wage a war against heresy. When he enjoyed an interview with Catherine, he made an impassioned case for her and her son to strike against Protestantism.

In the aftermath of their first meeting at Châtillon-sur-Loing (which transpired sometime in mid-July before the 19th), the Protestant leadership (Daussy suspects Coligny in particular took the lead) looked to establish a more rigorous military structure across the kingdom they could mobilise should the need arise. This took the form of a regulation dated 20 July. The kingdom was cut into sixteen provinces, each of which would play host to two councils of good men that would oversee the Protestant ability to raise money (1,000 écus or crowns a year) and soldiers in the event of war (in addition to appointing the leadership, maintaining a list of men who could fight for the church). Good captains would be appointed who could assess the potential military capacity of each district. They would maintain two lists, one of men who could support themselves in war without support, i.e. nobles, and another of those who could serve but who would need to be provisioned for. These lists were to be refreshed each year. The sum raised was applied retroactively going back to January 1567. It is likely (though the details do not survive) that these provinces roughly mapped onto the provinces of the kingdom, with Languedoc divided into upper and lower Languedoc. It was specified that the Three Bishoprics of Alsace were attached to the province of Champagne for the purposes of this system. Daussy highlights the importance of the fact that it was based on the governments of the kingdom, as opposed to the eight synodal regions, illustrating the desire to escape the ecclesiastical sphere of organisation among the Protestant leadership. The information these councils collated on the fighting strength could then be conveyed up the ladder to the provincial military leader, and then the Protestant aristocratic leadership at large. Thus, the leadership could know what resources they had at their disposal should the need arise. One of these councils featured a deputy of each bailliage and sénéchaussée and would meet once a month, while the other, a more permanent council that met once a week, comprised six councillors drawn from the provincial courts, as well as members of the former council. Protestant pastors were exhorted not to involve themselves in the business of these councils unless they were called on to do so and focus their attentions on their clerical responsibilities. Each province was also to send a reliable man to court, who could be there consistently. This was a usurpation of a previous schema that had seen each synodal region provide such men. Thus, this office was moved into the secular sphere. The representative who held this function would remain in office for a year and would have to give three months' notice for their departure, so that a continuous presence could be assured and they might train their successor.

Daussy suspects that the quick descent into civil war after this regulation of July, precluded its total implementation. He nevertheless sees in the rapid Protestant mobilisation in parts of the country after hostilities erupted, evidence that at least partial implementation might have been undertaken. He further argues evidence of its success can be found in the somewhat closer collaboration between the central Protestant leadership and their provincial counterparts during the second war of religion. In addition to these effects, it also freed the Protestant leadership from reliance on the presbyterian-synodal structure that they had relied on during the first civil war.

Around this time, the seigneur de Monluc began receiving information from various informants of Protestant war preparations. He alerted the French court, but his warnings were not taken seriously.

The admiral de Coligny again departed court sometime before 21 July, when his departure was remarked upon by the English ambassador, who explained that Coligny had been appraised of a plot tending to his disadvantage. He had however been granted the Spanish cipher by a secretary of the Spanish ambassador. The contemporary memoirist Haton explains his departure on the grounds that he was vexed at having been passed over for command of the new military forces in favour of the seigneur de Strozzi. Leaving court, he made for Châtillon-sur-Loing.

Towards the end of July, the cardinal de Lorraine returned to the French court, responding to the summons of Catherine. Around this time, he was of the belief that religious affairs in the kingdom might be settled if only Catherine and king Philip were able to meet for a few hours. His nephew, the duc de Guise had just had a marriage arranged with the Protestant widow of the prince de Porcien, Catherine de Clèves. Around this time, the Swiss mercenaries that the French had hired entered the kingdom.

Having got into a fracas with the maréchal de Cossé, who refused to respect his authority as colonel-general of the French infantry, Andelot was relieved of his charge of lieutenant-general of the French infantry. He confronted Catherine about the contempt he was held in, with Catherine noting that if she was against him, he would be dead. Andelot bitterly departed from court around the start of August, retiring to his lands in Brittany.

A dual marriage transpired in August for the children of the constable de Montmorency. In attendance were the Savoie-Nemours and the Lorraine-Guise. The seigneur de Méru was married to the eldest daughter of the maréchal de Cossé (the seigneur de Gonnor had recently acquired the baton of the maréchal upon the death of the seigneur de Bourdillon). Concurrently, Montmorency's fourth eldest daughter, Marie, married the comte de Candalle.

Coligny and Condé campaigned for the dismissal of the Swiss mercenaries. The crown was not yet ready to undertake this, Charles keen to see the 'fine soldiers' and thus Catherine had written to the constable de Montmorency on 21 August to have them brought to the capital so Charles could inspect them, and get his money's worth from their employment. Charles could not understand why the Protestant leadership would feel threatened by the employ of the Swiss. Seeing the Swiss approach Paris, the Protestant leadership demanded an explanation from Montmorency. According to the Protestant contemporary historian Agrippa d'Aubigné, writing decades later, he responded bluntly "Que voudraiz vous qu'on fist de ces Suisses bien payés si on ne les employait" (What would you have us do with these well paid Swiss but use them?). The fear and suspicions of the Protestants were mutual, the king having been appraised the Protestant leadership were secretly reaching out to their assemblies to put themselves in a state of readiness. Charles thus sent the seigneur de Thoré, a son of the Constable, to Châtillon. Coligny provided to Thoré a memorandum in which he denied having told a single man to take arms, noted that he did not control all the Protestants in France, and explained the distrust of the Protestants towards the king's Swiss, whose raising could have no other purpose than one tending towards their disadvantage due to the friendship between Philip and Charles.

The whole of August would be spent by the court in Compiègne, with the king seeing various places in Picardy, and devoting himself to hunting. There was satisfaction in the border province to see Charles inspect his fortresses, and the defences with Flanders. There would however be rumours in Protestant circles that secret meetings had been entertained in Picardy at La Fère and Marchais-en-Brie (where the court was to be found on 6 September), residences of the cardinal de Lorraine. It was alleged that at these meetings, it had been resolved to revoke the edict of Amboise, publish the Tridentine decrees and abolish Protestantism in France. An agent of the English crown reported that the cardinal de Lorraine hoped to draw Charles to his residence in Lorraine, so that he might discuss matters of religion and Scotland with him. Sutherland notes it is unclear how long the court spent at the latter location.

The English ambassador, Norris, reported back to England on 15 September that Condé had lodged formal protest against the edict of Amboise being revoked. He is to have received a reply from Catherine that as long as she held sway, it would remain in force. Catherine assured him that should he come to court, he would as welcomed as he could hope to be, and that the Swiss had been hired for the protection of the realm from a Spanish surprise, not to throw the realm into civil war.

== Notes ==
^α Knecht erroneously records the date as 12 April rather than 12 August.

== Sources ==
- Babelon, Jean-Pierre (2009). Henri IV. Fayard.
- Baumgartner, Frederic (1986). Change and Continuity in the French Episcopate: The Bishops and the Wars of Religion 1547-1610.
- Benedict, Philip (2003). Rouen during the Wars of Religion. Cambridge University Press.
- Boltanski, Ariane (2006). Les ducs de Nevers et l'État royal: genèse d'un compromis (ca 1550 - ca 1600). Librairie Droz.
- Boucher, Jacqueline (2023). "Le Cardinal de Lorraine, Premier Ministre de Fait ou d'Ambition (1559 – 1574)". In Bellenger, Yvonne (ed.). Le Mécénat et l'Influence des Guises. Classiques Garnier.
- Bourquin, Laurent (2001). Les Nobles, La Ville, et Le Roi: L'Autorité Nobilaire en Anjou Pendant les Guerres de Religion. Belin.
- Brunet, Serge (2017). «De l'Espagnol dedans le Ventre!»: Les Catholiques du Sud-Ouest de La France face à La Réforme (vers 1540–1589) Tome 1. Honoré Champion.
- Carpi, Olivia (2012). Les Guerres de Religion (1559-1598): Un Conflit Franco-Français. Ellipses.
- Carroll, Stuart (2005). Noble Power during the French Wars of Religion: The Guise Affinity and Catholic Cause in Normandy. Cambridge University Press.
- Carroll, Stuart (2006). Blood and Violence in Early Modern France. Oxford University Press.
- Carroll, Stuart (2011). Martyrs and Murderers: The Guise Family and the Making of Europe. Oxford University Press.
- Carroll, Stuart (2013). "'Nager entre deux eaux': The Princes and the Ambiguities of French Protestantism". Sixteenth Century Journal. 44 4.
- Champion, Pierre (1937). Catherine de Médicis présente à Charles IX son Royaume (1564-1566). Grasset.
- Champion, Pierre (1938). Paris sous les Derniers Valois - Paris au Temps des Guerres de Religion:Fin du Règne de Henri II, Régence de Catherine de Médicis, Charles IX. Calmann-Lévy.
- Champion, Pierre (1939). Charles IX: La France et le Controle de l'Espagne (Tome 1). Grasset.
- Champion, Pierre (1941). La Jeunesse de Henri III (1551 – 1571). Grasset.
- Chevallier, Pierre (1985). Henri III: Roi Shakespearien. Fayard.
- Christin, Olivier (1997). La Paix de Religion: L'Autonomisation de la Raison Politique au XVIe Siècle. Seuil.
- Christin, Olivier (1999). "From Repression to Pacification: French Royal Policy in the Face of Protestantism". In Benedict, Philip; Marnef, Guido; Nierop, Henk van; Venard, Marc (eds.). Reformation, Revolt and Civil War in France and the Netherlands 1555-1585. Royal Netherlands Academy of Arts and Sciences.
- Cloulas, Ivan (1979). Catherine de Médicis. Fayard.
- Cocula, Anne-Marie (1992). "Brantôme ou La Mauvaise Réputation du Duc d'Anjou, Futur Henri III". In Sauzet, Robert (ed.). Henri III et son Temps. Librairie Philosophique J.Vrin.
- Constant, Jean-Marie (1984). Les Guise. Hachette.
- Constant, Jean-Marie (1996). La Ligue. Fayard.
- Crété, Liliane (1985). Coligny. Fayard.
- Crouzet, Denis (1999). "Calvinism and the Users of the Political and the Religious (France, ca. 1560-ca. 1572)". In Benedict, Philip; Marnef, Guido; Nierop, Henk van; Venard, Marc (eds.). Reformation, Revolt and Civil War in France and the Netherlands 1555-1585. Royal Netherlands Academy of Arts and Sciences.
- Daussy, Hugues (2015). Le Parti Huguenot: Chronique d'une Désillusion (1557-1572). Droz.
- Daussy, Hugues (2023). "Le Parti Huguenot". Les Guerres de Religion 1559-1610: La Haine des Clans. In Fine Éditions d'art.
- Daussy, Hugues (2024). "L'Organisation Militaire du Parti Huguenot (1562-1598)". In Charere, Philippe; Daussy, Hugues (eds.). La France Huguenote: Histoire Institutionnelle d'une Minorité Religieuse (XVIe-XVIIIe Siècle). Presses Universitaires de Rennes.
- Dauvin, Antoine (2021). Un Mythe de Concorde Urbaine?: le Corps de Ville de Caen, le Gouverneur et le Roi durant les Guerres de Religion (1557-1594). Normandie Université.
- Decrue, Francis (1889). Anne, Duc de Montmorency: Connétable et Pair de France sous les Rois Henri II, François II et Charles IX. E. Plon, Nourrit et Cie.
- Diefendorf, Barbara (1985). "Prologue to a Massacre: Popular Unrest in Paris 1555-1572". The American Historical Review. 90 5.
- Diefendorf, Barbara (1991). Beneath the Cross: Catholics and Huguenots in Sixteenth Century Paris. Oxford University Press.
- Foa, Jérémie (2004). "Making Peace: The Commissioners for Enforcing the Pacification Edicts in the Reign of Charles IX (1560-1574)". French History. 18 3.
- Foa, Jérémie (2016). "Faire la Paix au Temps des Guerres de Religion, L'Exemple des Commisaires des Édits". Proslogion: Studies in Medieval and Early Modern Social History and Culture. 1 (13).
- Garrisson, Janine (1991). Guerre Civile et Compromis 1559-1598. Éditions du Seuil.
- Gellard, Matthieu (2014). Une Reine Épistolaire: Lettres et Pouvoir au Temps de Catherine de Médicis. Classiques Garnier.
- Gould, Kevin (2016). Catholic Activism in South-West France 1540-1570. Routledge.
- Haan, Bertrand (2011). L'Amitié Entre Princes: Une Alliance Franco-Espagnole au Temps des Guerres de Religion (1560-1570). Presses Universitaires de France.
- Harding, Robert (1978). Anatomy of a Power Elite: the Provincial Governors in Early Modern France. Yale University Press.
- Heller, Henry (1991). Iron and Blood: Civil War in Sixteenth-Century France. McGill-Queen's University Press.
- Hoby, Thos (1871). "Advises". In Crosby, Allan James (ed.). Calender of State Papers, Foreign Series of the Reign of Elizabeth, 1566-8. Longman & Co.
- Holt, Mack (2005). The French Wars of Religion, 1562-1629. Cambridge University Press.
- Holt, Mack (2020). The Politics of Wine in Early Modern France: Religion and Popular Culture in Burgundy 1477-1630. Cambridge University Press.
- Jouanna, Arlette (1989). Le Devoir de révolte: La noblesse française et la gestation de l'Etat moderne 1559-1661. Fayard.
- Jouanna, Arlette (1998a). "Le Temps des Guerres de Religion en France (1559-1598)". In Jouanna, Arlette; Boucher, Jacqueline; Biloghi, Dominique; Le Thiec, Guy (eds.). Histoire et Dictionnaire des Guerres de Religion.
- Jouanna, Arlette (2021). La France du XVIe Siècle 1483-1598. Presses Universitaires de France.
- Kingdon, Robert M. (1967). Geneva and the French Protestant Movement 1564-1572: A Contribution to the History of Congreationalism, Presbyterianism, and Calvinist Resistance Theory. Librairie Droz.
- Knecht, Robert (1996). The Rise and Fall of Renaissance France. Fontana Press.
- Knecht, Robert (2000). The French Civil Wars. Longman.
- Knecht, Robert (2010). The French Wars of Religion, 1559-1598. Routledge.
- Knecht, Robert (2014). Catherine de' Medici. Routledge.
- Knecht, Robert (2016). Hero or Tyrant? Henry III, King of France, 1574-1589. Routledge.
- Labourdette, Jean François (2013). Charles IX et la Puissance Espagnole: Diplomatie et Guerres Civiles (1563–1574). Honoré Champion.
- Labourdette, Jean François (2018). Charles IX, un Roi dans la Tourmente des Guerres Civiles (1560 – 1574). Honoré Champion.
- Le Roux, Nicolas (2013). Le Roi, La Cour, L'État de La Renaissance À L'Absolutisme. Champ Vallon.
- Le Roux, Nicolas (2022). 1559-1629 Les Guerres de Religion. Gallimard.
- Le Roux, Nicolas (2023). "Les Protestants, le Roi et la Ligue: Les Guerres de Religion dans la France du Nord". In Le Roux, Nicolas (ed.). Les Guerres de Religion: Une Histoire de l'Europe au XVIe Siècle. Passés Composés.
- Lhoumeau, Charles Sauzé de (1940). Un Fils Naturel de François Ier: Louis de Saint-Gelais, baron de la Mothe-Saint-Héray. Société Française d'Imprimerie et de Librairie.
- Mariéjol, Jean H. (1983). La Réforme, la Ligue, l'Édit de Nantes. Tallandier.
- Miquel, Pierre (1980). Les Guerres de Religion. Fayard.
- Neuschel, Kristen (1989). Word of Honor: Interpreting Noble Culture in Sixteenth-Century France. Cornell University Press.
- Nicoll, David (2020). Noble Identity during the French Wars of Religion: Antoine de Crussol, the duc d'Uzès. University of Warwick.
- Nicoll, David (2025). "The Difficulties of Disarmement during the French Wars of Religion: the Role of Antoine, comte de Crussol". French History. XX.
- Pailhès, Claudine (2022). Les Comtes de Foix: Des Pyrénées au Trône de France XIe-XVIe Siècle. Éditions Loubatières.
- Pernot, Michel (1987). Les Guerres de Religion en France 1559-1598. Sedes.
- Pernot, Michel (2013). Henri III: Le Roi Décrié. Éditions de Fallois.
- Pitts, Vincent (2012). Henri IV of France: His Reign and Age. Johns Hopkins University Press.
- Potter, David (1997). The French Wars of Religion: Selected Documents. Palgrave Macmillan.
- Potter, David (2021). The French Wars of Religion in France, 1559-1598: A History in Documents. unpublished.
- Ribera, Jean-Michel (2018). Diplomatie et Espionnage: Les Ambassadeurs du Roi de France auprès de Philippe II - Du Traité du Cateau-Cambrésis (1559) à la mort de Henri III (1589). Classiques Garnier.
- Rivault, Antoine (2023). Le Duc d'Étampes et la Bretagne: Le Métier de gouverneur de Province à la Renaissance (1543-1565). Presses Universitaires de Rennes.
- Roberts, Penny (1996). A City in Conflict: Troyes during the French Wars of Religion. Manchester University Press.
- Roberts, Penny (2013). Peace and Authority during the French Religious Wars c.1560-1600. Palgrave Macmillan.
- Roelker, Nancy Lyman (1968). Queen of Navarre: Jeanne d'Albret 1528-1572. Harvard University Press.
- Roelker, Nancy Lyman (1996). One King, One Faith: The Parlement of Paris and the Religious Reformation of the Sixteenth Century. University of California Press.
- Salmon, J.H.M. (1979). Society in Crisis: France in the Sixteenth Century. Metheun & Co.
- Shimizu, J. (1970). Conflict of Loyalties: Politics and Religion in the Career of Gaspard de Coligny, Admiral of France, 1519–1572. Geneva: Librairie Droz.
- Solnon, Jean-François (2001). Henri III: un désir de majesté. Librarie Académique Perrin.
- Souriac, Pierre-Jean (2008). Une Guerre Civile: Affrontements Religieux et Militaires dans Le Midi Toulousain (1562-1596). Champ Vallon.
- Sournia, Jean-Charles (1981). Blaise de Monluc: Soldat et Écrivain (1500-1577). Fayard.
- Sutherland, Nicola (1962). The French Secretaries of State in the Age of Catherine de Medici. The Athlone Press.
- Sutherland, Nicola (1973). The Massacre of St Bartholomew and the European Conflict 1559-1572. Macmillan.
- Sutherland, Nicola (1980). The Huguenot Struggle for Recognition. Yale University Press.
- Thompson, James (1909). The Wars of Religion in France 1559-1576: The Huguenots, Catherine de Medici and Philip II. Chicago University Press.
- Turchetti, Mario (1999). "Middle Partis in France during the Wars of Religion". In Benedict, Philip; Marnef, Guido; Nierop, Henk van; Venard, Marc (eds.). Reformation, Revolt and Civil War in France and the Netherlands 1555-1585. Royal Netherlands Academy of Arts and Sciences.
- Venard, Marc (1999). "Catholicism and Resistance to the Reformation in France, 1555-1585". In Benedict, Philip; Marnef, Guido; Nierop, Henk van; Venard, Marc (eds.). Reformation, Revolt and Civil War in France and the Netherlands 1555-1585. Royal Netherlands Academy of Arts and Sciences.
- Vester, Matthew (2012). Renaissance Dynasticism and Apanage Politics: Jacques de Savoie-Nemours 1531-1585. Truman State University Press.
- Vray, Nicole (1997). La Guerre des Religions dans la France de l'Ouest: Poitou-Aunis-Saintonge 1534-1610. Geste Éditions.
- Wanegffelen, Thierry (2005). Catherine de Médicis: Le Pouvoir au Fémenin. Payot & Rivages.
- Wood, James (2002). The Kings Army: Warfare, Soldiers and Society during the Wars of Religion in France, 1562-1576. Cambridge University Press.
