= Anne de Montmorency, 1st Duke of Montmorency =

French soldier, statesman and diplomat (1493–1567)

Anne de Montmorency
- 1st Duc de Montmorency; Constable of France; Grand Maître of France
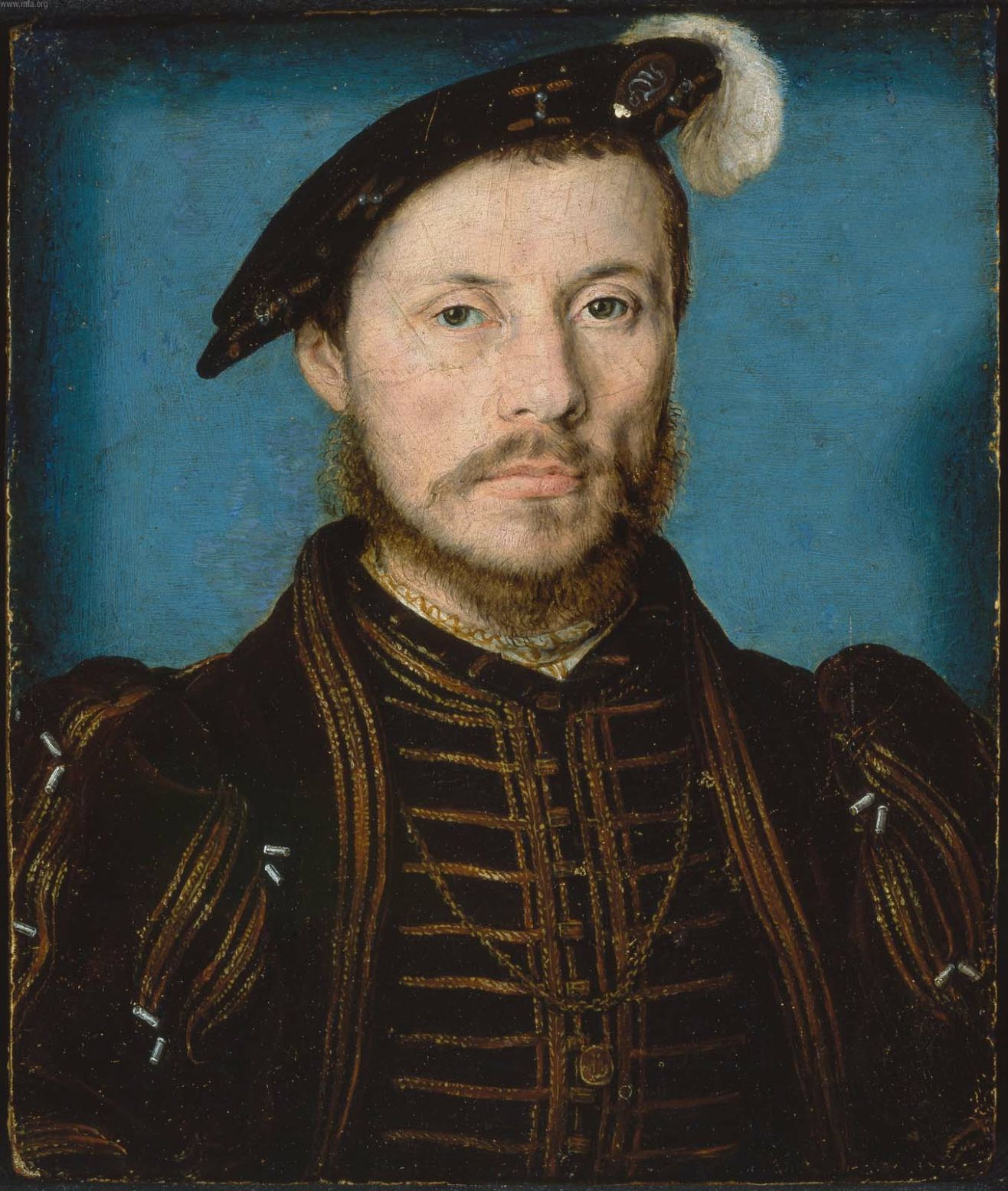
- Portrait by Corneille de Lyon
- Born: c. 1493; Chantilly
- Died: 12 November 1567 (aged 74); Paris
- Noble family: Montmorency
- Spouse: Madeleine de Savoie
- Issue Detail: François; Henri; Charles; Guillaume
- Father: Guillaume de Montmorency
- Mother: Anne de Saint-Pol

Anne de Montmorency, duc de Montmorency (c. 1493 – 12 November 1567) was a French noble, governor, royal favourite and Constable of France during the mid to late Italian Wars and early French Wars of Religion. He served under five French kings (Louis XII, François I, Henri II, François II and Charles IX). He began his career in the latter Italian Wars of Louis XII, seeing service at Ravenna. When François, his childhood friend, ascended to the throne in 1515 he advanced as governor of the Bastille and Novara, then in 1522 was made a Marshal of France. He fought at the French defeat at La Bicocca in that year, and after assisting in rebuffing the invasion of Constable Bourbon he was captured at the disastrous Battle of Pavia. Quickly freed, he then worked to free first the king and then the king's sons. In 1526, he was made Grand Maître (Grand Master), granting him authority over the king's household. In the same year, he was also made governor of Languedoc. He aided in the marriage negotiations for the king's son, the duc d'Orléans to Catherine de' Medici in 1533. In the mid 1530s he found himself opposed to the war party at court led by Admiral Chabot and therefore retired. He returned to the fore after the Holy Roman Emperor invaded Provence, leading the royal effort that foiled his invasion, and leading the counter-attack. In 1538 he was rewarded by being made Constable of France, this made him the supreme authority over the French military. For the next two years he led the efforts to secure Milan for France through negotiation with the Emperor, however this proved a failure and Montmorency was disgraced, retiring from court in 1541.

He spent the next several years at his estates, relieved of the exercise and incomes of his charges, and removed as governor of Languedoc. He allied with the dauphin, the future Henri II during this time in his rivalry with the king's third son. Upon the dauphin's ascent in 1547 Montmorency was recalled from his exile and restored to all his offices, with his enemies disgraced. He now found himself opposed at court by the king's mistress Diane de Poitiers and her allies the duc de Guise and Cardinal de Lorraine. He led the crushing of the gabelle revolt of 1548 and then the effort to reconquer Boulogne from the English which was accomplished by negotiated settlement. In 1551 he was elevated from a baron to the first duc de Montmorency. In 1552 he led the royal campaign to seize the Three Bishoprics from the Holy Roman Empire, though was overshadowed by the glory Guise attained in the defence of Metz. Montmorency led the inconclusive northern campaigns of 1553 and 1554 and was increasingly criticised for his cautious style of campaign. From 1555 he led the drive to peace that secured the Truce of Vaucelles in mid 1556, however the peace would be shortlived. In 1557 he was again tasked with fighting on the northern frontier, and was drawn into the disastrous battle of Saint-Quentin at which he was captured and the French army destroyed. Guise was thus made lieutenant-general of the kingdom, while Montmorency tried to negotiate peace from his captivity. The king supported him in this from late 1558 and in April 1559 he would help bring about the Peace of Cateau-Cambrésis which brought the Italian Wars to an end.

When Henri II died in July 1559, Montmorency was sidelined by the new Guise-led government of François II, which relieved him of the office of Grand Maître. He would not participate in the Conspiracy of Amboise that attempted to overthrow the Guise regime however. When François in turn died in December 1560, he was recalled to a central position in the government, though subordinate to the role granted to the king of Navarre who was made lieutenant-general by the new king's mother, the regent Catherine. He quickly became disenchanted with the new government and entered opposition alongside Guise and Marshal Saint-André, forming an agreement known to history as the 'Triumvirate' in 'defence of Catholicism'. When the French Wars of Religion erupted the following year, he and his Triumvirate colleagues secured the royal family for their cause and fought against the Protestants led by Navarre's brother, the prince de Condé. In the climactic battle of the war at Dreux Montmorency was again made prisoner, and from his captivity negotiated the peace with the likewise captive Condé. During the peace, he joined Catherine and the court for the grand tour of the kingdom and feuded with his former ally Guise. In 1567 the Protestant aristocracy led a new coup against the crown and Montmorency led the defence of Paris against their army. Pushed to confront the Protestants, Montmorency died as a result of wounds sustained at the battle of Saint Denis on 12 November 1567.

== Early life and family ==
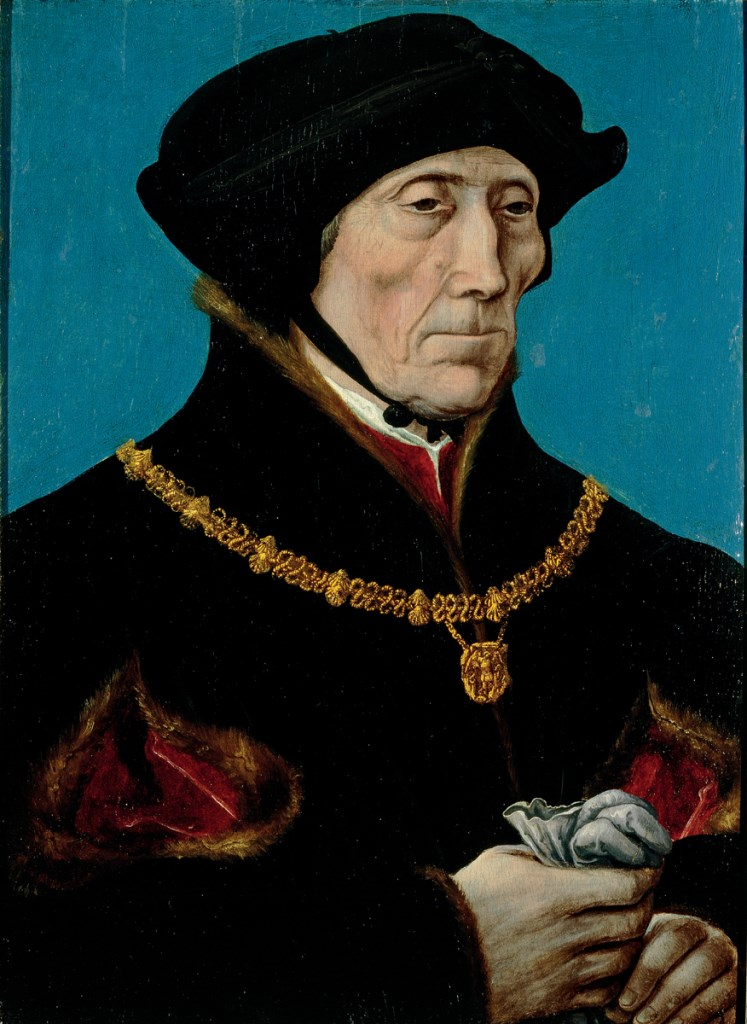
Guillaume de Montmorency, father of the Constable

Anne de Montmorency was born in 1493 at Chantilly, the son of Guillaume de Montmorency and Anne de Saint-Pol. His parents named him for his godmother, Anne, queen of France. Guillaume held a senior position in the household of the future king François I (at that time, comte d'Angoulême).

The Montmorency family prided itself on being the 'oldest barons' in France. Indeed, Montmorency's son would later boast to the English ambassador that the barons of Montmorency existed before there were kings of France. Despite these boasts, Montmorency was not a prince, and therefore his rivals the Lorraine family had a greater pedigree than he did. Montmorency would however fire back that he was a true born Frenchman, while the Lorraine family were 'foreign princes'. This criticism stung his rivals, who were pleased to see the barony of Joinville raised to a principality in their favour in April 1552 so that they would no longer be 'foreign princes' but 'French princes'.

=== Marriage and children ===
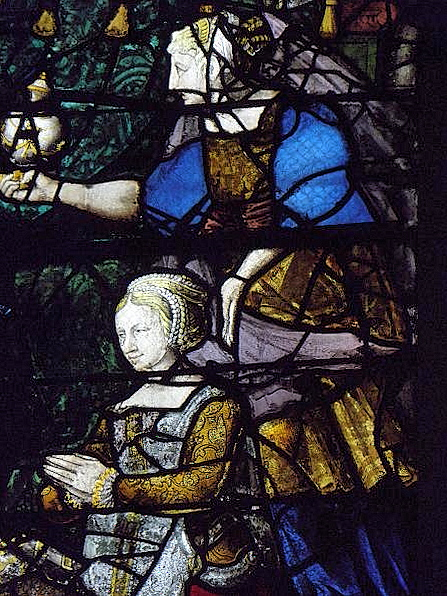
Madeleine de Savoie, who would marry Montmorency in 1527

Montmorency married Madeleine de Savoie, a cousin of the king François I on 10 January 1527. Their marriage was sumptuously celebrated by the king during a period of extravagance at court which contrasted with the relative paucity of funds at the disposal of the household of the king's captive children in Spain. This marriage brought Montmorency into the royal family and going forward the king's mother and sister referred to him as their nephew. Madeleine brought with her to the marriage family lands in Picardy. Her brother, Montmorency's new brother-in-law was Claude de Savoie, comte de Tende the governor of Provence. He was thus afforded a relation with powerful interests near his governate of Languedoc that he lacked in terms of personal feudal control. Together they had the following issue:

- Éléonore de Montmorency (1528–1556), married François III de La Tour d'Auvergne, vicomte de Turenne in 1546 and had issue.
- Jeanne de Montmorency (1529–1596), married Louis III de La Trémoille, duc de Thouars in 1549 and had issue.
- François de Montmorency (1530–1579), Marshal (1559), duc de Montmorency (1567), governor of the Île de France (1556). Married Diane de France in 1557 without issue.
- Catherine de Montmorency (1532–1595), married Gilbert III de Lévis, duc de Ventadour in 1552.
- Henri I de Montmorency (1534–1614), duc de Montmorency (1579), governor of Languedoc (1563), Constable of France (1593). Married Antoinette de La Marck in 1559 and had issue.
- Charles de Montmorency (1537–1612), sieur de Méru then duc de Damville. Married Renée de Cossé in 1571 without issue.
- Gabriel de Montmorency (1541–1562), sieur de Montbéron.
- Guillaume de Montmorency, (1544–1591) sieur de Thoré. Married Léonore d'Humières in 1561 without issue.
- Marie de Montmorency (1547–1572), married Henri de Foix-Candale in 1567 without issue.
- Louise de Montmorency, abbesse de Maubuisson.

Several of Montmorency's sons were afforded the privilege, by his senior station at court, to become enfants d'honneur (children of honour), which meant they were raised alongside the royal children. For his daughters, Montmorency secured prestigious marriages into esteemed families, including La Trémouille, Ventadour, Foix-Candale, and Turenne. These were all great lords in the south west of France, important in Poitou, Limousin and Auvergne respectively. He provided his daughters with suitably grand dowries, the eldest three bringing 50,000 livres to their marriages, while the last brought 75,000 livres. His sons meanwhile were all introduced to military careers by their father, with none destined for the church.

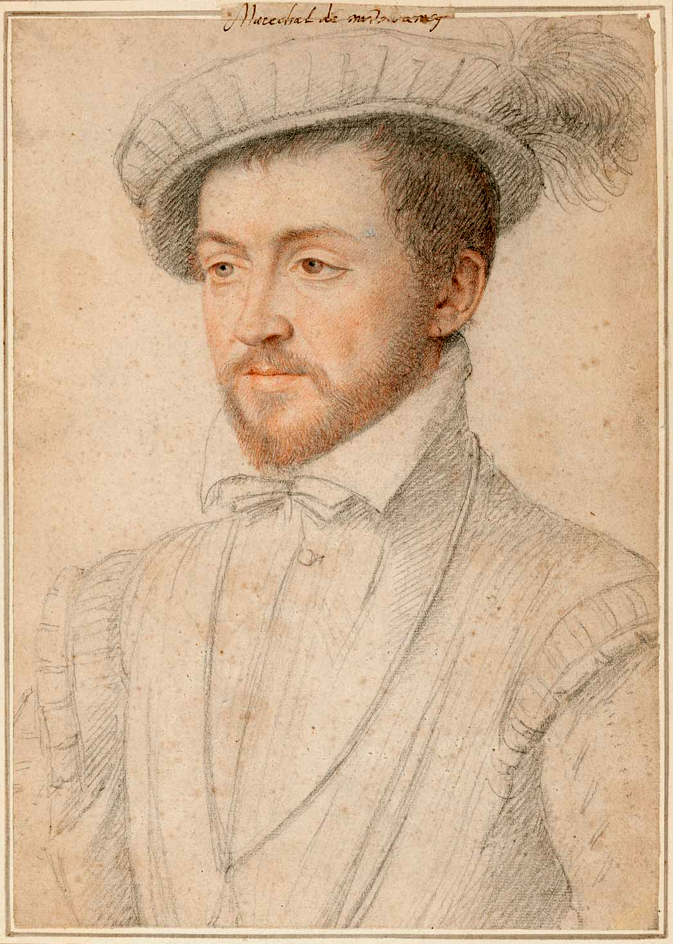
Montmorency's eldest son François, who succeeded him as duc

His eldest son, François transgressed against his father's plans for his marriage into the royal family by exchanging legally binding paroles de promesse with Jacqueline de Piennes. In reaction to this 'betrayal', Montmorency got a law passed in 1557 that allowed a father to disinherit a son under the age of 30, or a daughter under the age of 25 who married without their parents permission. The law was retroactive, thereby obliging his son to annul the arrangement. He further had Jacqueline confined to a convent. His intended marriage of his son to Diane would go ahead on 4 May 1557, thereby further uniting the Montmorency with the royal family.

The death of his daughter Éléonore and her husband left Montmorency with the responsibility to raise the future Marshal of France, the vicomte de Turenne.

=== Relatives ===
Unlike the Lorraine family he would not take advantage of his power to put many of his relatives into senior positions in the French church, this left the field open for his rivals to dominate the senior positions of the French clergy.

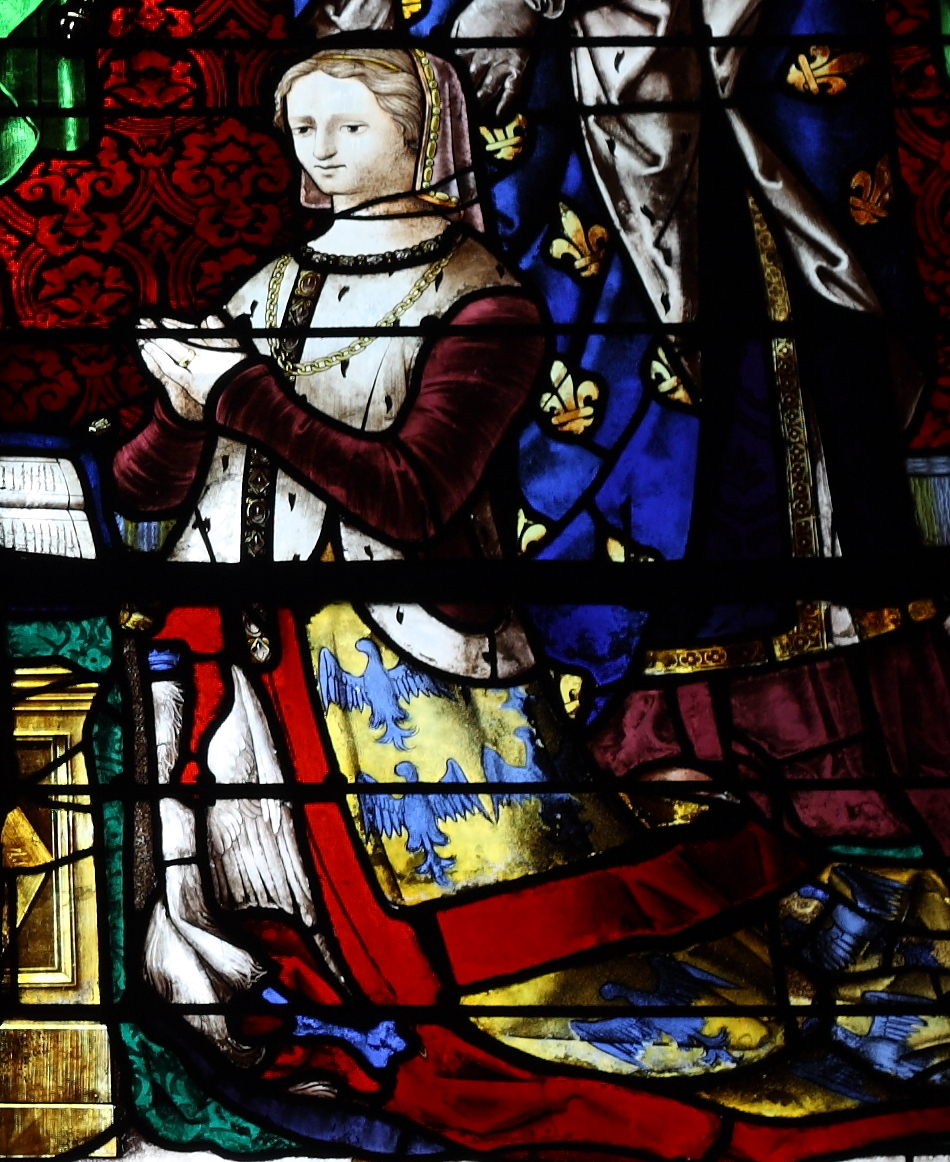
Montmorency's sister Louise, an early convert to Protestantism who raised his nephews in the religion

Montmorency's sister Louise de Montmorency was an early secret convert to Protestantism among the great nobility and married Gaspard I de Coligny. Her husband died in 1522, and therefore Montmorency and his sister would jointly raise his nephews, who would all be drawn towards Protestantism. Montmorency was greatly attached to his lineage, and thus despite his strong religious convictions did not formally oppose them for some time.

Through his sister, Montmorency had three nephews who would go on to play an important role in the early French Wars of Religion. Gaspard de Coligny, Odet de Coligny and François de Coligny all converted to Protestantism and led the movement with zeal. The first, would become Admiral of France, the second most senior role in the French military, while Odet would become a Cardinal at the age of 16 due to Montmorency's influence. Montmorency's sons would not follow his nephews into Protestantism.

=== Religion ===
In religious temperament Montmorency, and his wife, were firmly Catholic, and were displeased by the Protestantism Montmorency's sister and nephews adopted. Montmorency's four sons would share his Catholicism, though both Thoré and Méru were sympathetic to Protestantism at one point or another. During his political ascendency, he received concerned reports of the growth of Protestantism in south-west France. Montmorency's Catholicism was not Ultramontane but rather highly Gallican in disposition. It was therefore with Montmorency's encouragement that Henri II flirted with the possibility of schism with the Papacy. He objected to the political program that often existed alongside Protestant movements in France, which advocated radical reforms. Despite this, the realities of Protestant opposition to the power of the Lorraine family in the 1560s meant that Montmorency was drawn in a more tolerant direction by his sons. He would have great affection for his nephews despite his disapproval of their religious persuasion. For Montmorency it was understood that the war on heresy that he supported was not meant to target members of the social elite (such as his nephews). So long as they publicly conformed it was no ones business what they did in their private chapels.

In his later years, Montmorency was afflicted with Gout.

He had a reputation as a taciturn man, something which contrasted with some of his more refined contemporaries in the French court. He was described by contemporaries as a 'bluff soldier' and conservative in temperament.

=== Wealth and estates ===
With many offices to his name, by 1560 Montmorency enjoyed an annual income from his various positions of 32,000 livres (pounds). This direct income from the crown did not include the revenues he received from his many estates and territories across the kingdom. With his various estates factored in, Montmorency enjoyed an income of around 180,000 livres in 1548, which dwarfed the income of the Bourbon-Vendôme princes of the blood that sat at around 71,000 livres. At the end of his life in 1567, Montmorency enjoyed pensions totalling 45,000 livres, alongside his income from the office of Constable which was around 24,000 livres, and an income from his land of 138,000 livres.

Indeed, by land the Montmorency were the wealthiest non-royal family in France. It was said that they had more than 600 fiefs to their name. Alongside his great wealth, the Montmorency family could count on more clients than any other 'private' family in the kingdom. Montmorency had great landed interests in the Pays de l'Oise, Vexin, Picardy, Burgundy, Normandy, Champagne, Angoumois, Berry and Brittany.

=== Châteaux and residences ===
The Montmorency family had great landed estates in the Île de France, including the famous Châteaux of Écouen and Chantilly.

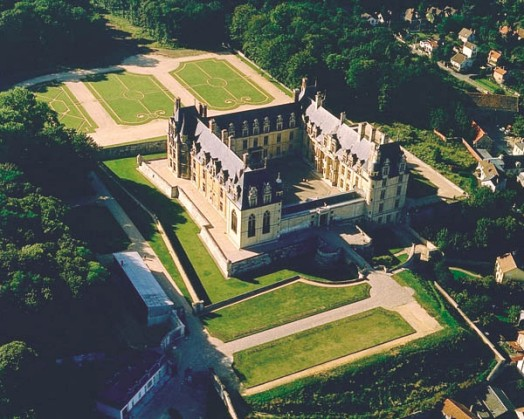
Château d'Écouen, with some renovations since Montmorency's time

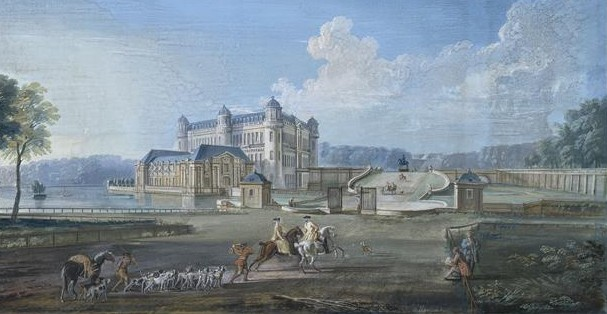
Château de Chantilly during the Seventeenth-Century, the original château was destroyed during the French revolution

The Château of Écouen was built under his direction beginning in 1538, meanwhile Chantilly was restored at his request from 1527 to 1532. Écouen was a testament to the new architectural style of the period, and was renowned for its beauty, it featured sculpture work by Jean Goujon (such as the sculpture of victory wielding the sword of the Constable, which hung over the fireplace) with the architecture overall led by Jean Bullant. Écouen featured two statues by Michelangelo that had been gifted to Montmorency by François I (originally destined for the tomb of Pope Julius II), along with mosaics of coloured stones and an elaborate courtyard. The emblems of Henri II, Catherine de Medici and his own would be strewn throughout the château. Chantilly was so grand it rivalled a royal palace, the original feudal centre of the château renovated inside in the style of the Renaissance. Beginning in 1524 Montmorency added a long gallery to the château. A small châtelet (gatehouse) was added at the level of the pond.

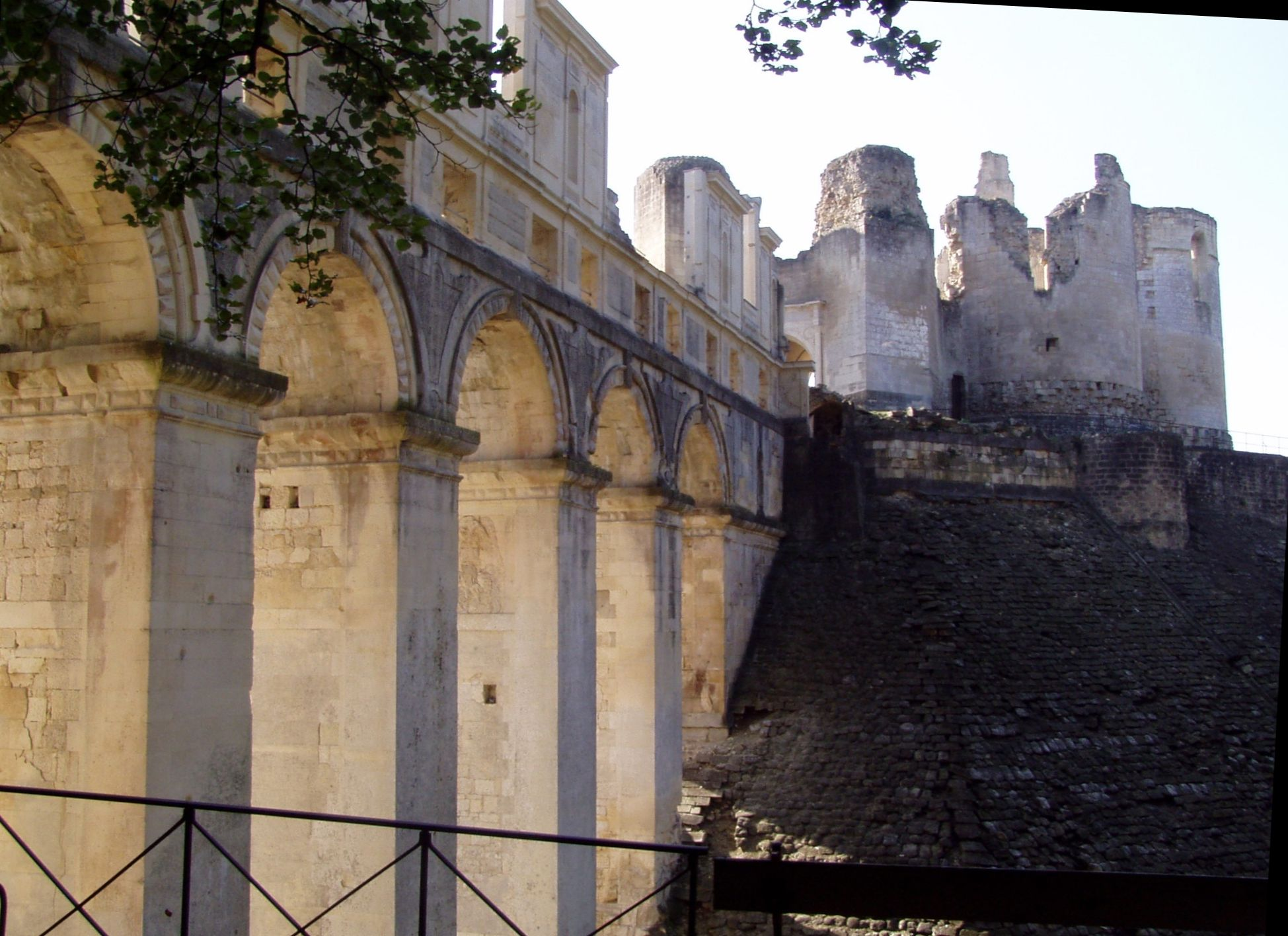
Ruins of the Château of Fère-en-Tardenois

These were two of the seven principal châteaux belonging to Montmorency, the others being Thoré, Mello, La Rochepot, Offémont and Châteaubriant. The royal family would occasionally stay at his châteaux, as when in 1565 Catherine and Charles IX spent time at Châteaubriant during the royal tour of the kingdom. Henri II also had occasion to stay at one of Montmorency's baronial residences of Fère-en-Tardenois in both 1547 and after the campaign of 1552. In 1531 François was pre-occupied staying at Chantilly with Montmorency when his mother died, and therefore did not come to her bedside.

In Paris itself he had four hôtels (grand residences), one of which featured a room devoted to listening to music to emphasise his 'cultured nature'.

=== Patron of the arts ===
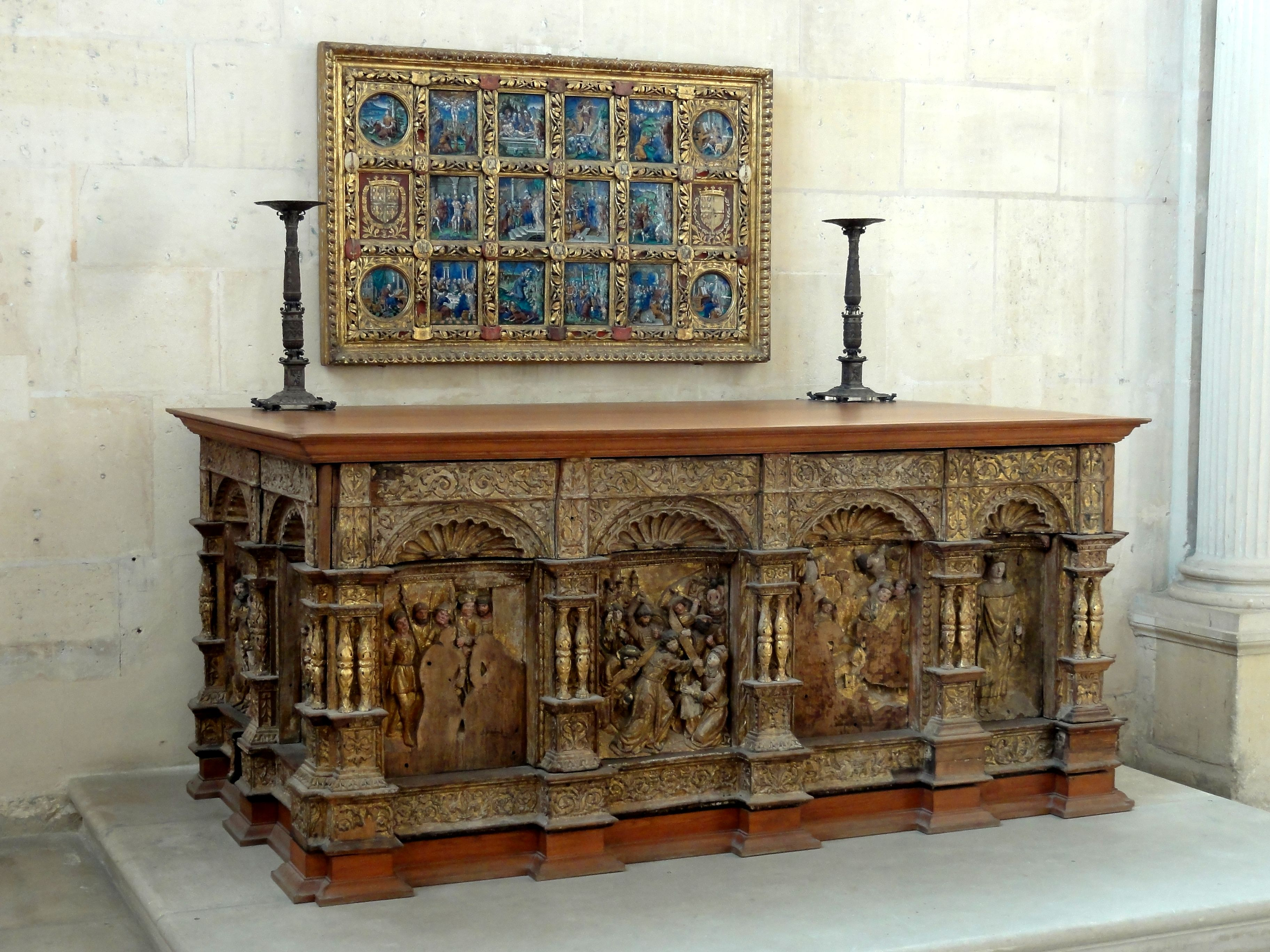
Retable with painted Limoges enamels by Léonard Limousin in Écouen

Montmorency was also a patron of the arts, and commissioned the famous painter Léonard Limousin who produced an Limoges enamel dish which depicted a scene inspired by Raphael in which the various Greek gods were used as representations of the king, queen and his mistress. The artist Rosso Fiorentino produced a rendition of the Pietà for him in 1538. This work is now housed in the Louvre. His châteaux also boasted libraries filled with books acquired from Rome. Montmorency was a collector of antiques, and arms, which he stored in his châteaux.

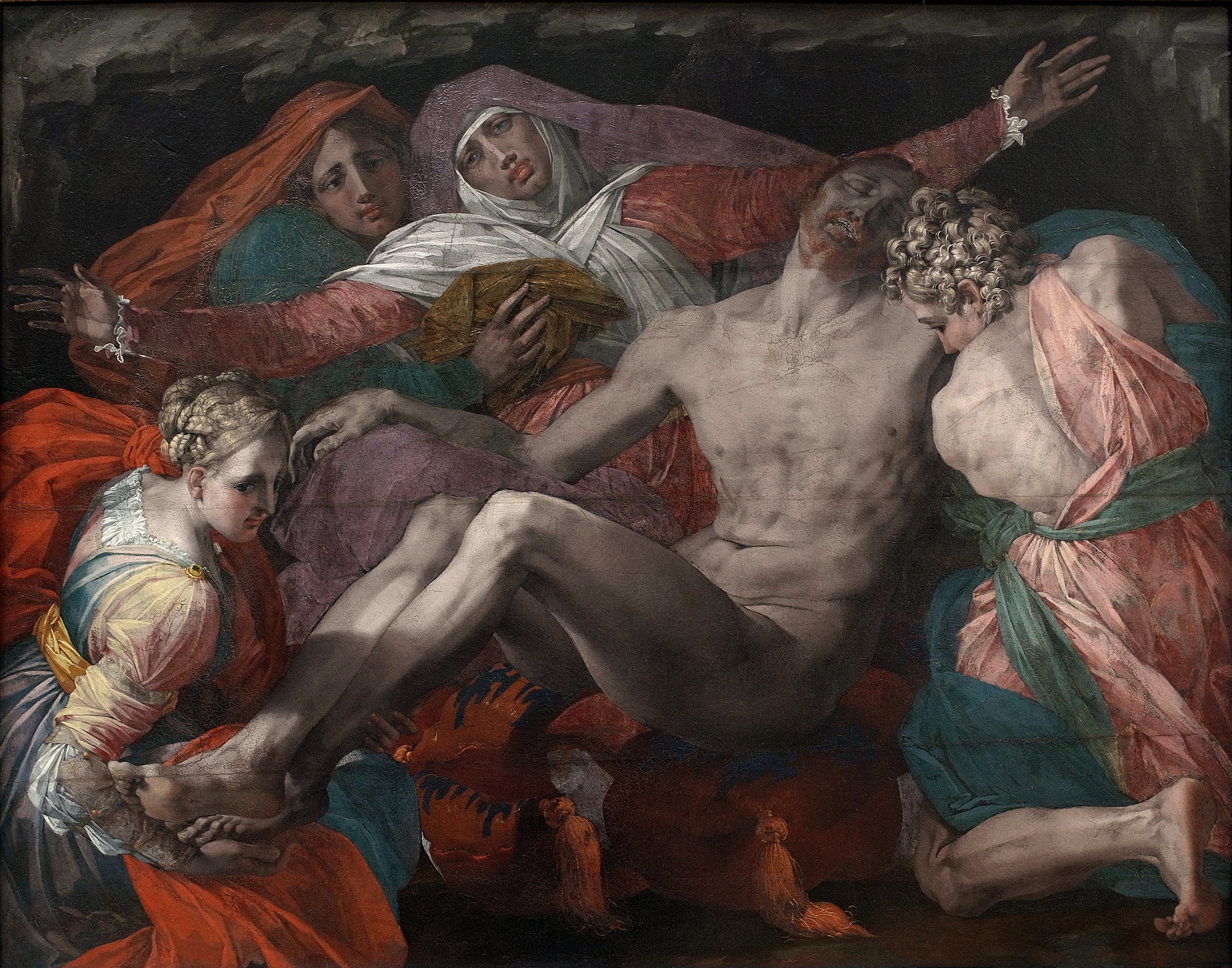
Pièta produced for Montmorency by Rosso Fiorentino, now Louvre

=== Childhood ===
In his youth, Montmorency was a playmate of the comte d'Angoulême, the future king François I. The two played racket sports together alongside another future royal favourite Philippe de Chabot.

== Early career ==
=== Ascent of François I ===
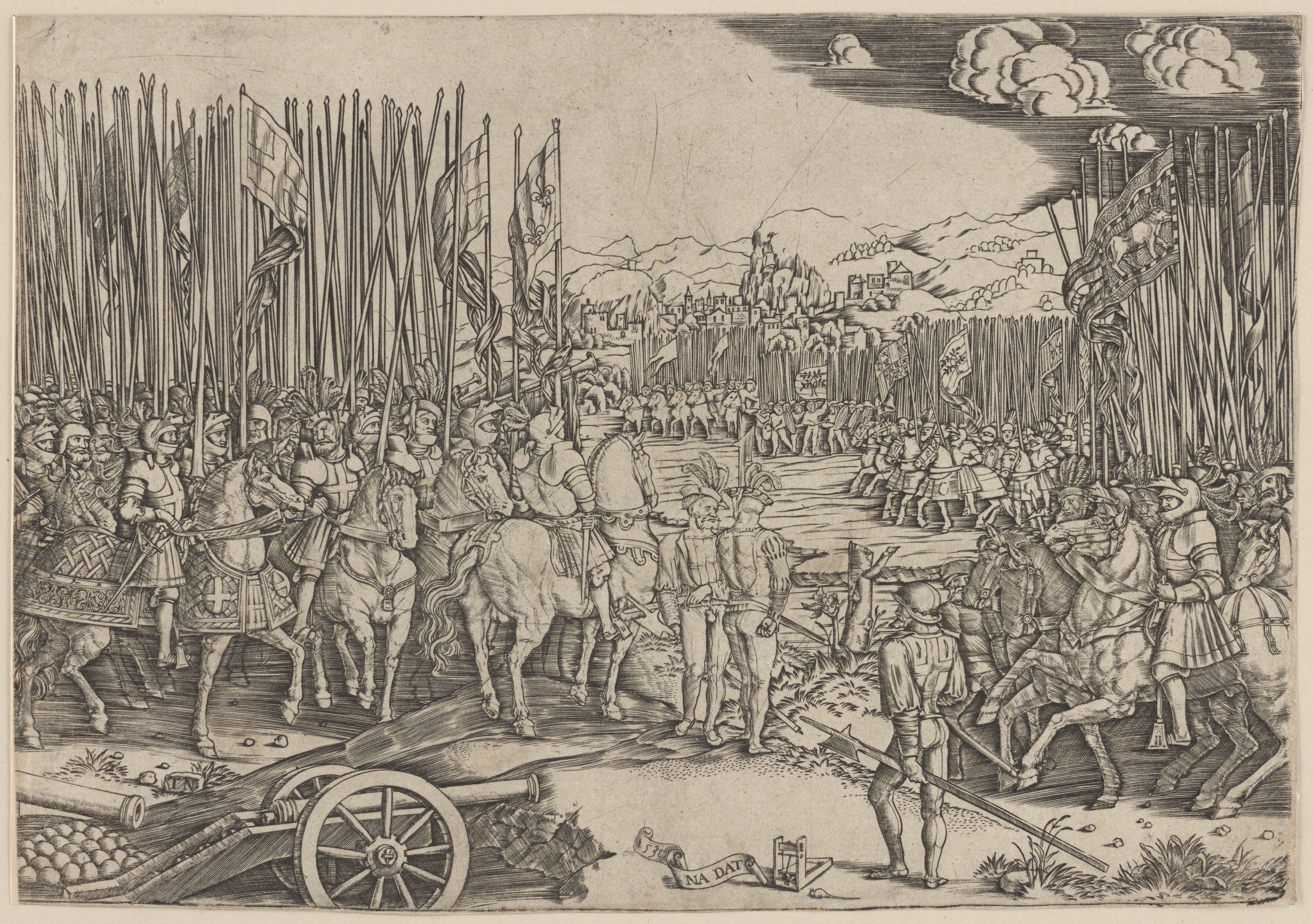
Battle of Ravenna at which Montmorency got his first experience of combat

Montmorency saw his first military service in 1511 in the campaigns of King Louis XII and fought at the famous battle of Ravenna in the following year.

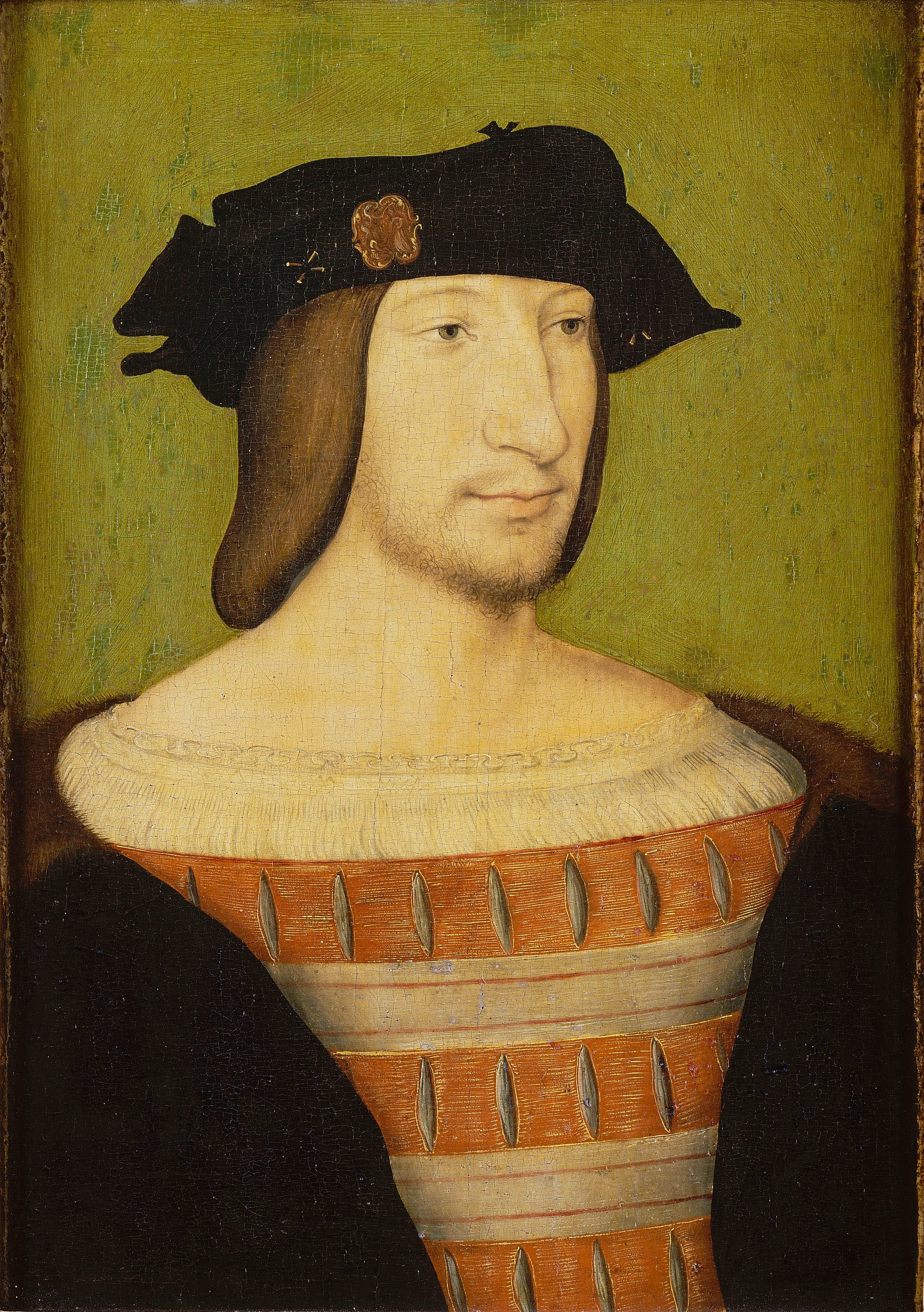
François I in 1515, the year of his ascent to the throne

When François I ascended to the throne in 1515 he was keen to reassert the French claims to Milan. Montmorency therefore joined the campaign into Italy and distinguished himself in the service of the king at the battle of Marignano in 1515.

Around 1516, Montmorency already enjoyed the privilege of being the captain of 100 lances, even though he was only 23 years old. At this time he was made governor of the Bastille and governor of Novara in Italy.

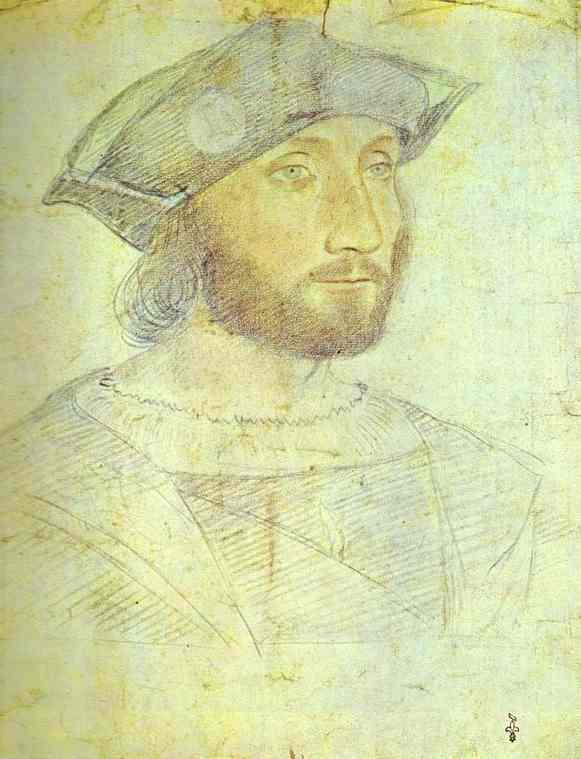
Admiral Bonnivet who led the embassy to England that secured the return of Tournai to France

With relations declining between France and the Holy Roman Empire in 1518, a rapprochement was undertaken with England. Admiral Bonnivet led an embassy to England accompanied by 80 young 'gallants'. The product of this embassy was a series of treaties. Tournai was to be returned to France, in return for 600,000 écus (crowns). Cardinal Wolsey was further financially compensated for the loss of his see (Tournai), and eight French nobles were dispatched to England as hostages pending the final settlement between the two countries. One of the nobles who spent time as a hostage in England was Montmorency.

This was not the end of his advancement early in the reign of François, and around 1520 he was established as premier gentilhomme de la chambre du roi (first gentleman of the king's chamber), giving him privileged private access to the king.

When an Imperial army invaded France in August 1521, Montmorency helped lead the defence of Mézières during a siege.

=== Marshal ===
Collar of the Ordre de Saint-Michel

In August 1522 he became one of the Marshals of France, was made a councillor of the king, and was inducted into the Ordre de Saint-Michel (Order of Saint-Michel) as a chevalier (knight).

Montmorency enjoyed poor relations with the comte de Saint-Pol (the count of Saint-Pol) brother of the duc de Vendôme (duke of Vendôme). This complicated matters when Montmorency was established as commander of the garrison of Doullens in 1522 under the authority of Saint-Pol. Saint-Pol refused to depart the province, claiming this would be to his dishonour in their dispute. Saint-Pol enjoyed some support in his push for Montmorency's removal, but the Marshal was not without his own allies.

=== La Bicocca ===
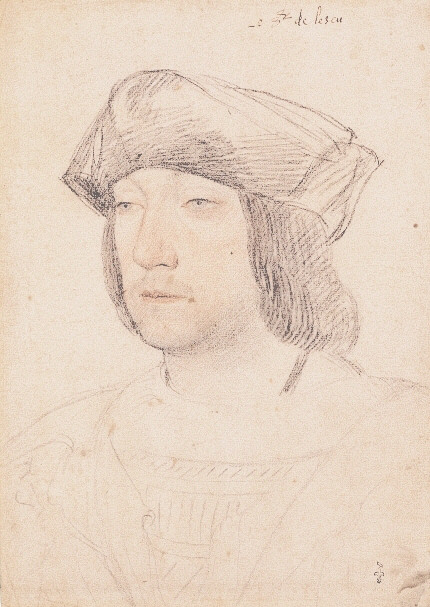
The vicomte de Lautrec under whom Montmorency served during the Bicocca campaign

In that year, Montmorency fought in Italy under the command of the vicomte de Lautrec (viscount of Lautrec). He received communications from his father at court, who informed him of the efforts the king's councillors were making to ensure the royal finances were in order. Lautrec commanded an army of Swiss, French and allied Venetians. He faced off against the condotierri Prospero Colonna, who commanded the Imperial forces based in Milan in front of Pavia. The arrival of Colonna's army near Pavia forced Lautrec to back off, much to the irritation of his Swiss forces, who were eager to be paid. Colonna (with his army of 18,000) shadowed Lautrec as he pulled back from Pavia, and established himself at Bicocca. Lautrec understood La Bicocca to be a highly defensible position, but the Swiss troops argued in favour of battle which was therefore given.

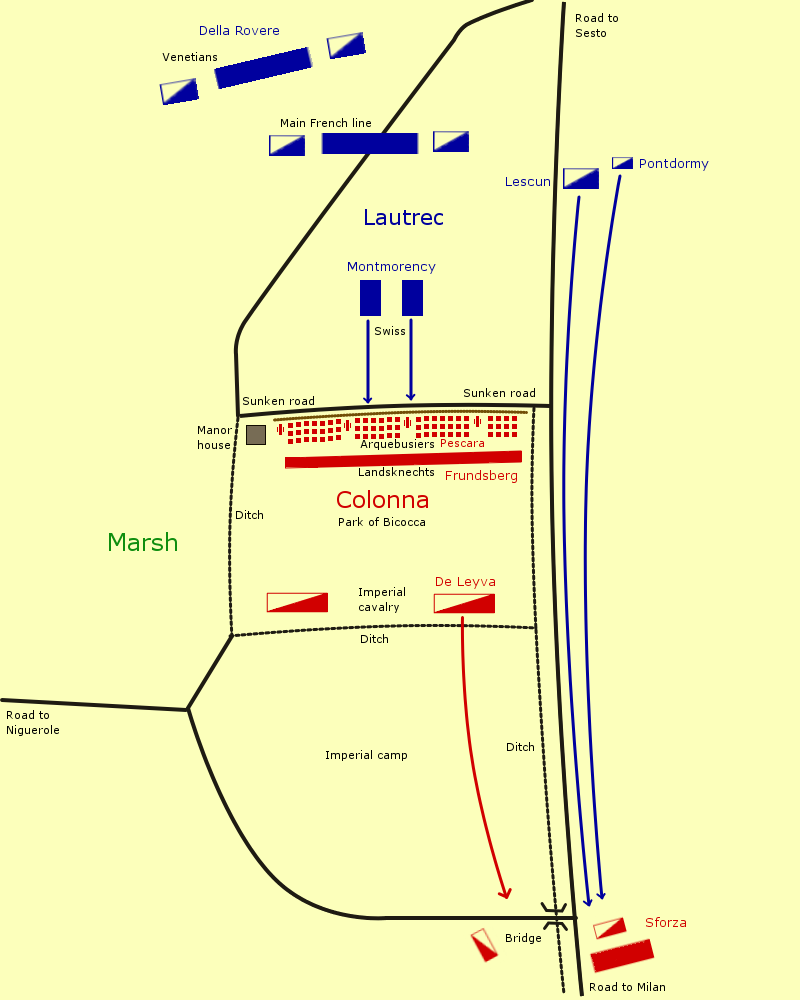
Battle of La Bicocca, Montmorency and the Swiss assault the front of the Imperial line

Lautrec gave the Swiss permission to charge the enemy, while French nobles, under the command of Montmorency followed them on foot in the hopes of gaining glory. Lautrec took the final portion of the army around the right flank hoping to enter the Imperial camp that way. The frontal assault of the Swiss was a bloodbath, the French nobles with Montmorency suffered equally badly and the two groups would constitute a large part of the 3000 dead. After the defeat, the Swiss soon left the army, as did the Venetians, Lautrec himself returned to France where he received a cold reception from the king.

=== Bourbon's betrayal ===
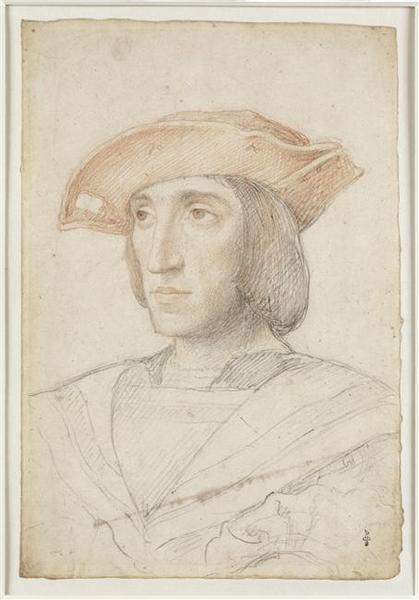
Constable Bourbon who betrayed France to the Imperial side in 1523

To compound the misfortune of the disaster at La Bicocca, France was hit with the treason of Constable Bourbon, who signed a treaty with the Holy Roman Emperor Charles V on 18 July 1523. Around this time England, which had previously allied with France against the empire decided to declare war on the kingdom, invading Picardy and the coasts of Brittany and Normandy. While this situation was developing, Montmorency was charged with raising a new royal army for a southern thrust. He found mercenaries willing to fight for the crown, and with new artillery also assembled, Montmorency brought them to Lyon for a push into Italy. François then travelled south to join the army at Lyon in August, only to be hit by an illness, word of the English attacks in Picardy and the knowledge of Bourbon's betrayal.

French campaign into Italy 1524-1525, Montmorency swings up towards Alessandria

François felt it necessary, with Bourbon's betrayal to abandon his plans to join the campaign, and he returned to court to secure the kingdom, leaving the army under the direction of Admiral Bonnivet who led the 30,000 men Montmorency had assembled towards Turin in September 1523, but the army was ravaged by disease and was forced to retreat from Italy in April 1524. On the retreat, Montmorency led the vanguard of the army but became so ill from the plague that racked the army that he had to be carried in a litter. Upon re-entering France, the Swiss troops formerly under Bonnivet's command went their own way vowing never again to work with the French, while the French never again desired to trust the Swiss.

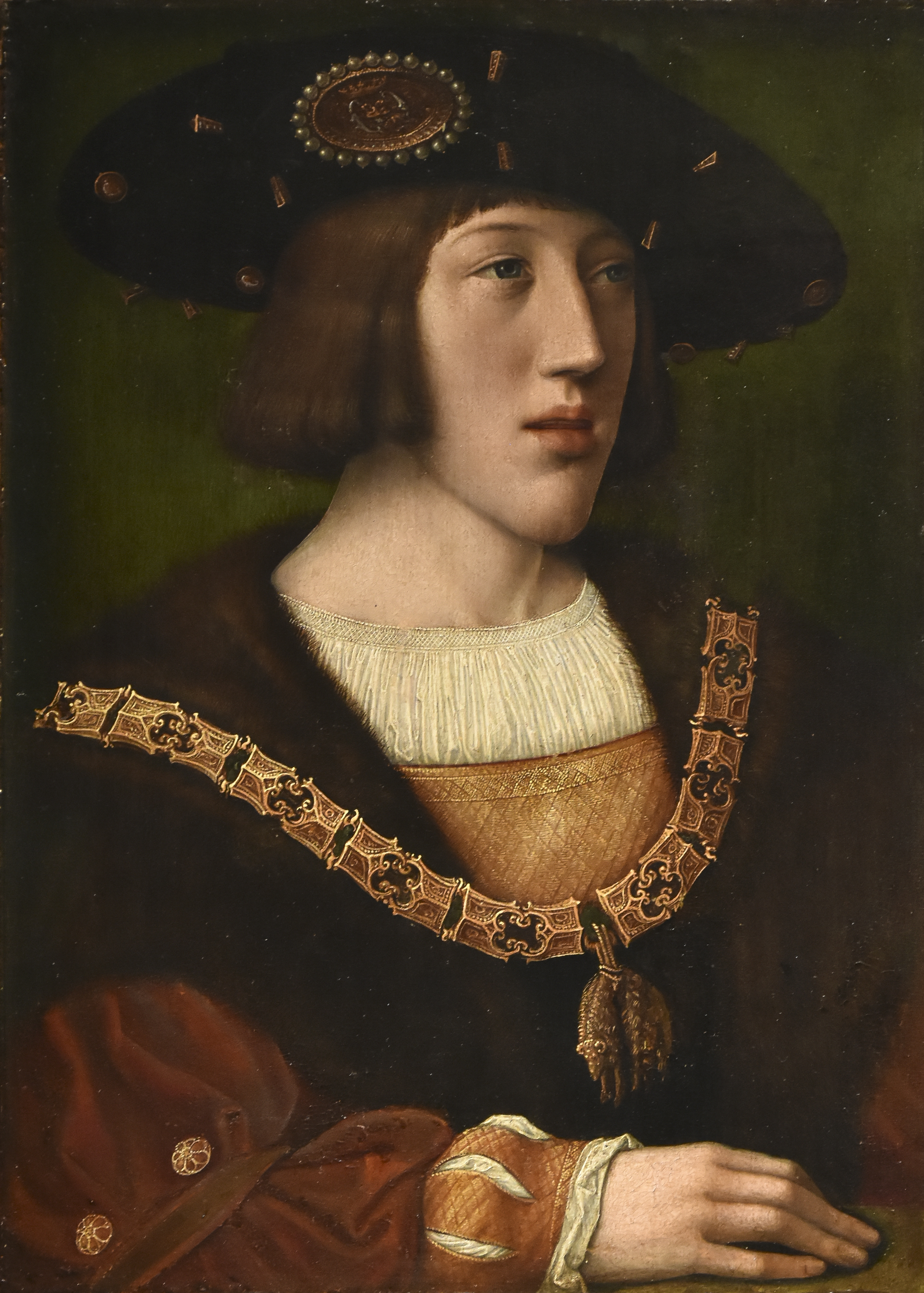
Holy Roman Emperor Charles V, who would lead the Empire in opposition to France from 1519 to 1556

The Holy Roman Emperor Charles V was keen to revenge himself on France for their campaigns in Italy, and to this end appointed the 'traitor' Constable Bourbon to lead an army out from Italy into France in Autumn 1524. Bourbon hoped to invade in coordination with an army under the king of England and the Emperor, however neither would join him in the endeavour. Having invaded Provence, Bourbon became bogged down besieging Marseille while François mustered a strong army at Avignon. On 29 September 1524, Bourbon recognised his efforts were hopeless and began a retreat. Montmorency pursued with his cavalry, meanwhile François restored French control over Aix which had fallen to Bourbon. François followed in Montmorency's wake and continued the campaign back into Italy, entering the Duchy of Milan. Under Montmorency's command were the dauphin and the future royal favourite Saint-André. The dauphin found himself reliant on Montmorency, particularly due to his increasingly difficult relationship with his father François.

=== Pavia ===
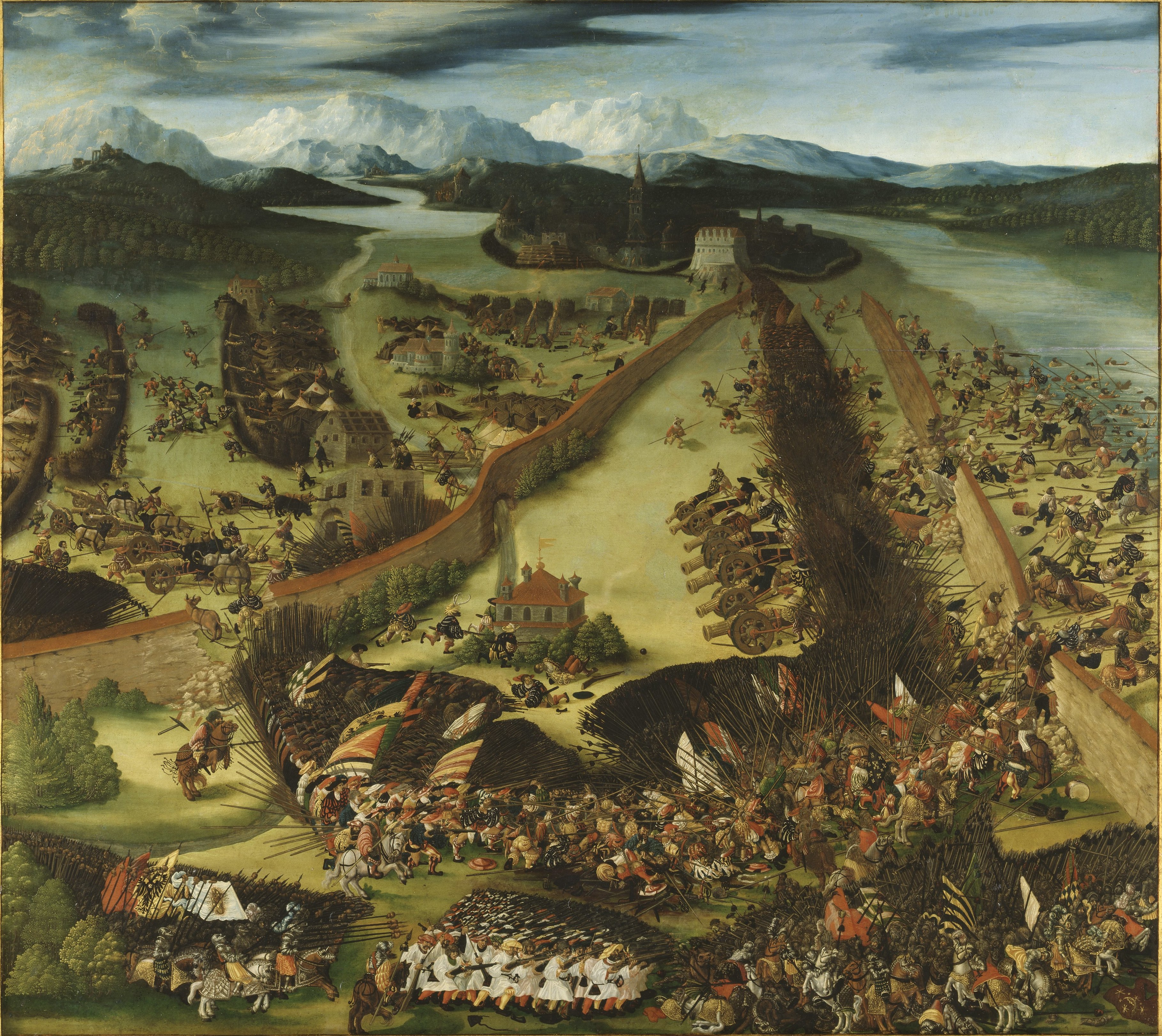
Battle of Pavia at which François and Montmorency were both made captive and the French army destroyed

François decided to put Pavia to siege, and settled in for the winter around the city. The Imperial army, conscious that if they tried to wait the French out their army would dissolve for lack of pay, decided to force a battle with the French. The battle of Pavia was an unmitigated disaster for the French. François, Henry II, king of Navarre, the comte de Saint-Pol, the comte de Tende, future father in law of Montmorency and Montmorency himself were all taken prisoner. The Imperial army was almost overwhelmed by the number of prisoners that they took.

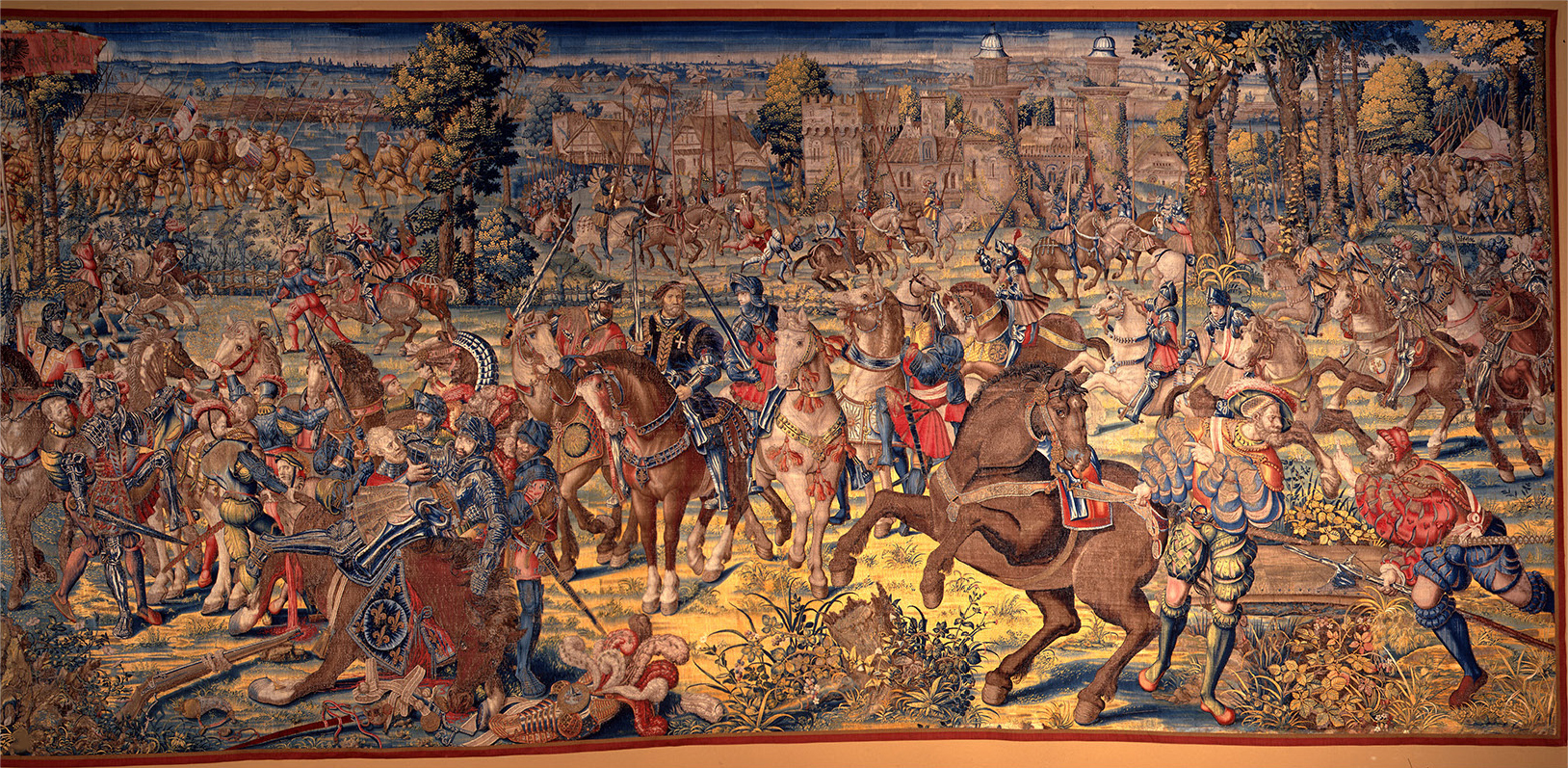
François is unhorsed and made captive at Pavia

Montmorency and François were held captive in Pizzighettone, alongside other great nobles such as the future Admiral of France, Philippe de Chabot. Montmorency was granted permission to depart his captivity in the service of raising funds for his ransom in early March. Montmorency met up with the royal family and assured them the king was in good health, and urged them to write often, as news of his family was François' greatest joy. After his return to captivity the Papal Nuncio, who had visited the king, would remark that Montmorency was the king's main source of comfort in captivity.

=== Captive king ===
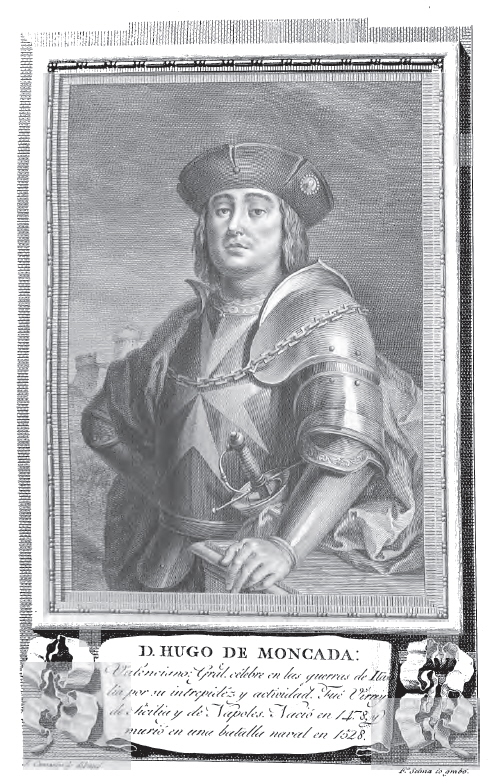
Ugo de Moncada, French captive exchanged for Montmorency

Montmorency would not be in captivity long, and was exchanged for Ugo de Moncada. François at first remained captive in Pizzighettone, before proposing to his captors that he be transferred to Spain. The Imperial viceroy Lannoy agreed, but to stop any mischief by the French fleet requested several French galleys be involved in the transfer. Montmorency therefore arranged with the regency government for 6 galleys to be handed over. The fleet left Genoa on 31 May 1525. Montmorency then travelled to Toledo where he appealed for safe-conduct for François' sister Marguerite to come and negotiate a peace in Spain and that a truce be declared while negotiations were ongoing. The Emperor allowed all this, and Montmorency went to the regency government to obtain the powers to agree the truce. Philippe de Chabot travelled to Toledo soon thereafter and signed a truce on 11 August.

In exchange for peace, the Emperor demanded that France cede Burgundy, recognise Imperial control of Artois and Flanders and relinquish their claims on Napoli and Milan. This was too much for François and his mother Louise de Savoie who led the regency. From his captivity in Madrid, François first considered escape, and when frustrated in this, abdication in favour of his eldest son so that the Imperials would no longer possess a valuable captive with which to extort France. In the event of his release, François was to be restored to the crown with his sons regal powers suspended until the formers death. Montmorency and Cardinal de Tournon witnessed the sealing of the decision. Montmorency brought the decision of the king from Madrid to the Paris Parlement (highest court in France) to register, but they refused to consider the king's abdication, moreover the Emperor was not fooled by the manoeuvrer which only alerted him to the value of the king's children. In the treaty which released him from his captivity in January 1526 his release was contingent on the captivity of his two eldest sons as a guarantee that he would cede the land he committed to (including Burgundy). Montmorency brought the news of the treaty back to France.

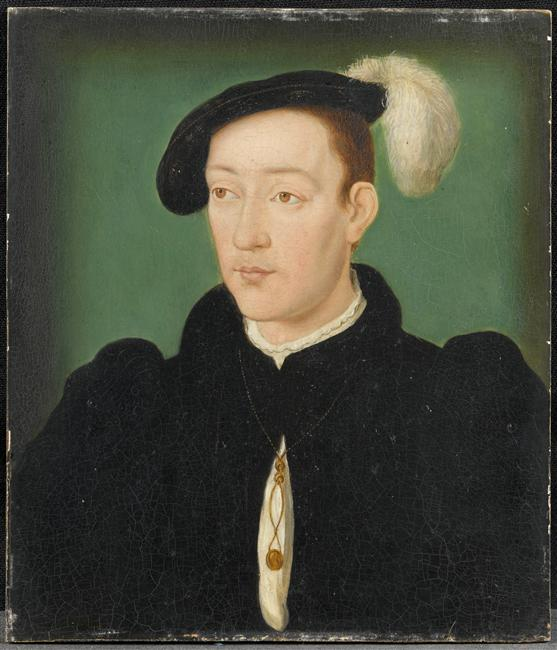
Eldest son of François and dauphin of the kingdom

In fact the treaty provided two options for the king, either he cede the dauphin and twelve of the kingdom's military leaders (among them Montmorency, the duc de Guise, Lautrec and Admiral Chabot) or he cede both his first and second son. It was this latter course which was pursued, the regent little desiring to deprive the kingdom of its military leadership.

== Ascent ==
=== Grand Maître ===
Batons of the Grand Maître

Montmorency was appointed to the position of governor of Languedoc on 23 March 1526. The post had formally been occupied by the traitor Bourbon. In the same year he received this honour he was made Grand Maître (Grand-Master), and therefore given supreme authority over the king's household and the court. In this office he replaced the king's uncle the comte de Tende, who had died of the wounds he sustained at the battle of Pavia. As Grand Maître, Montmorency enjoyed a position as head of the king's councils, which convened under his auspices. He also held authority over appointments in the royal household, court expenditure and security. This authority over the king's household gave him an important intermediary position as regarded the two young princely hostages that had been delivered to the Imperial camp, and it was through him that all correspondence with them would be conducted. For the management of the king's material household, he had at his disposal deputies, including the premier maître d'hôtel (first steward).

Bourbon's sack of Rome in 1527 had the effect of fostering a greater understanding between England and France. King Henry VIII feared that the captive Pope would not be able to sanction his divorce. Therefore Wolsey met with François to talk business in August 1527 at Amiens. It was arranged for Mary Tudor, daughter of Henry to marry the duc d'Orléans and Henry retracted his objection to François' marriage. If war began again with the Emperor, English merchants would maintain their privileges in France. To celebrate the newfound accord, Montmorency was dispatched to England, to award the Ordre de Saint-Michel (Order of Saint-Michel) on Henry, while Henry in turn awarded the Order of the Garter to François.

=== Captivity of the princes ===
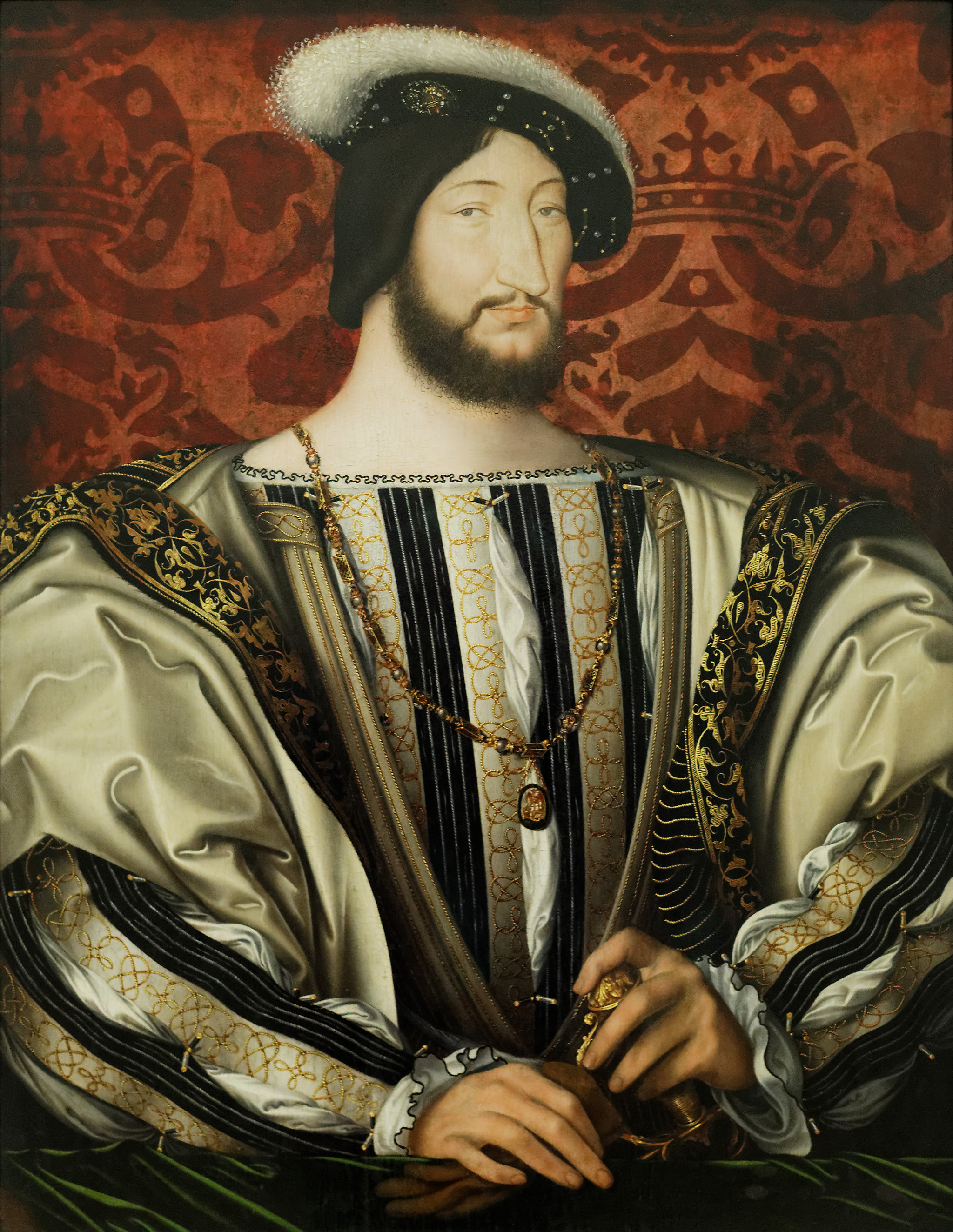
King François in 1527

In December 1527, François convened an Assembly of Notables with the aim of raising 2,000,000 écus to either pay the ransom of his sons, or if the Emperor attached the return of Burgundy to the ransom, the money would be used to prosecute a new war against the Empire. The Assembly responded positively, with the clergy offering 1.3 million livres in return for the rescue of the Pope, destruction of Protestantism and protection of Gallicanism. The nobility likewise promised their goods and lives. The prévôt des marchands (provost of the merchants) agreed Paris would pay part of the ransom. The promises needed to be converted to money, however the nobility proved less than willing to deliver what they had agreed. Montmorency took responsibility for securing the money required from the Boulonnais but was frustrated that they would only grant him a fifth. He was so upset at their 'insolence' that he did not even pass their offer on to the king. He told the sénéchal (seneschal) that nothing would be accepted from the region until they had committed themselves the way other regions had. Eventually the Boulonnais complied. Due to the 'stinginess' of some parts of France, the king would be obliged to take loans, using Montmorency as the guarantor.

A sensitive matter arose in 1528 as the English king Henry sought a divorce from his wife, the aunt of the Holy Roman Emperor. François was keen to support the English king in acquiring it but was sensitive that open support would be politically dangerous, given his sons were still in Imperial captivity. Therefore he worked on the theologians of Paris through a proxy, and Montmorency took it upon himself to rebuke a syndic named Noël Béda who objected to the divorce, however Béda remained firm. Béda would indeed go on to sabotage the debate at the faculty of theology, much to the disquiet of the English ambassador.

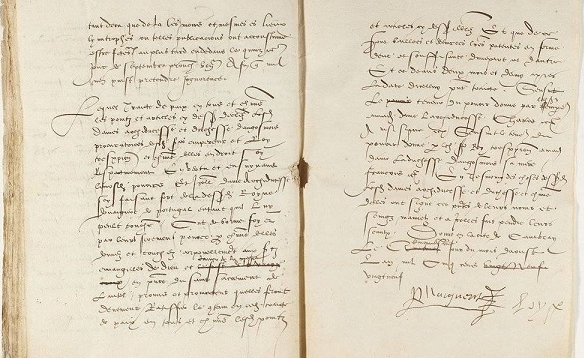
Text of the Paix des Dames

Montmorency had an important role to play in the negotiations that were conducted, beginning 5 July 1529 between Louise de Savoie and Margaret of Austria. Montmorency assisted the king's mother Louise alongside Chancellor Duprat and the queen of Navarre. Together they would establish a peace agreement known as the treaty of Cambrai or Paix des Dames (Peace of the Ladies). An enormous ransom of 2,000,000 écus would restore the liberty of the princes, while François would have to abandon his suzerainty over Artois, Flanders, Milan and Naples, but would be allowed to maintain Burgundy, Auxerre and Mâcon.

During his first period of ascendency in the 1530s, Montmorency ensured the disgrace of the vice-admiral of France (and governor of Le Havre) Charles de Moy. His relations with the vice-admiral would remain poor for decades, as typified by his ensuring that his nephew Coligny would receive the office governor of Le Havre upon the accession of Charles IX in 1560.

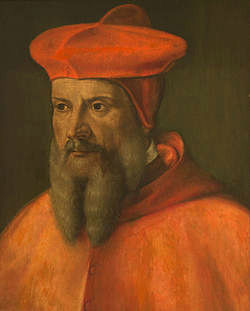
Cardinal de Tournon who would be ascendant in French government during the period of Montmorency's disgrace from 1541 to 1547

As far as the execution of the terms of the treaty were concerned, François delegated responsibility to Montmorency and Cardinal de Tournon. By 29 April 1530, Montmorency was able to show to the Spanish finance-general a large pile of gold already assembled for the Emperor. By May the money assembled would be ready, and handed over to the Spanish delegation. It would however take until June for the entire ransom of 1,200,000 écus to be paid off. By this time Tournon had taken over responsibility for the provision of the money, while Montmorency went to receive the hostages from their exile in Spain from the condestable (Constable) de Castilla, as well as François' new bride the sister of Charles V. The crossing over of the princes to France and the money to Spain was scheduled for 1 July to be overseen by Montmorency. The Condestable of Castilla was suspicious of a trap, and halted the advance of the royal children when he received word that a large party of French horsemen were nearby, fearing that the French may take the children and then intercept the ransom. As the hours passed, Montmorency was increasingly concerned that the party of the Condestable had not yet appeared and sent an envoy to find them. Upon reaching the Spanish camp, the representative was told of Castilla's suspicions of a trap, which caused the representative to challenge Castilla to single combat. The new queen of France took it upon herself to threaten Castilla with disgrace if he did not continue with the transfer. Finally it began, Montmorency and the French money departing in a boat from one side of the river to a pontoon in the centre, while Castilla and the royal children did likewise from the other bank. The Condestable provided his apologies to the two young princes for the conditions of their imprisonment, only the dauphin responded graciously.

=== Guardian of the princes ===
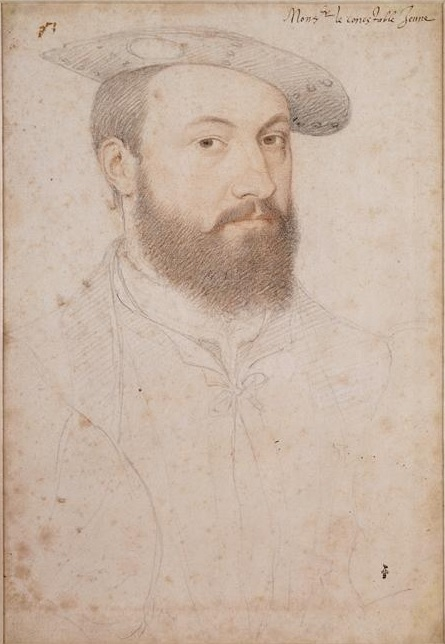
Montmorency in 1530

In the years that followed, it would be Montmorency who devoted himself to the needs and time of the young princes, supervising their days from dawn to dusk in his capacity as Grand Maître, and winning their affection with his attentions and provisions. He oversaw the education of the dauphin and duc d'Orléans (as the king's second son was known at that time), planned out their days and instructed them in the courtly ceremonies in a way the king lacked time for. To support him in providing for the young princes, Montmorency relied on three men, Humières, Saint-André and the comte de Brissac. Several of his nephews (Coligny and Andelot) would be among the enfants d'honneur (children of honour) who had the privilege of being raised alongside the royal children.

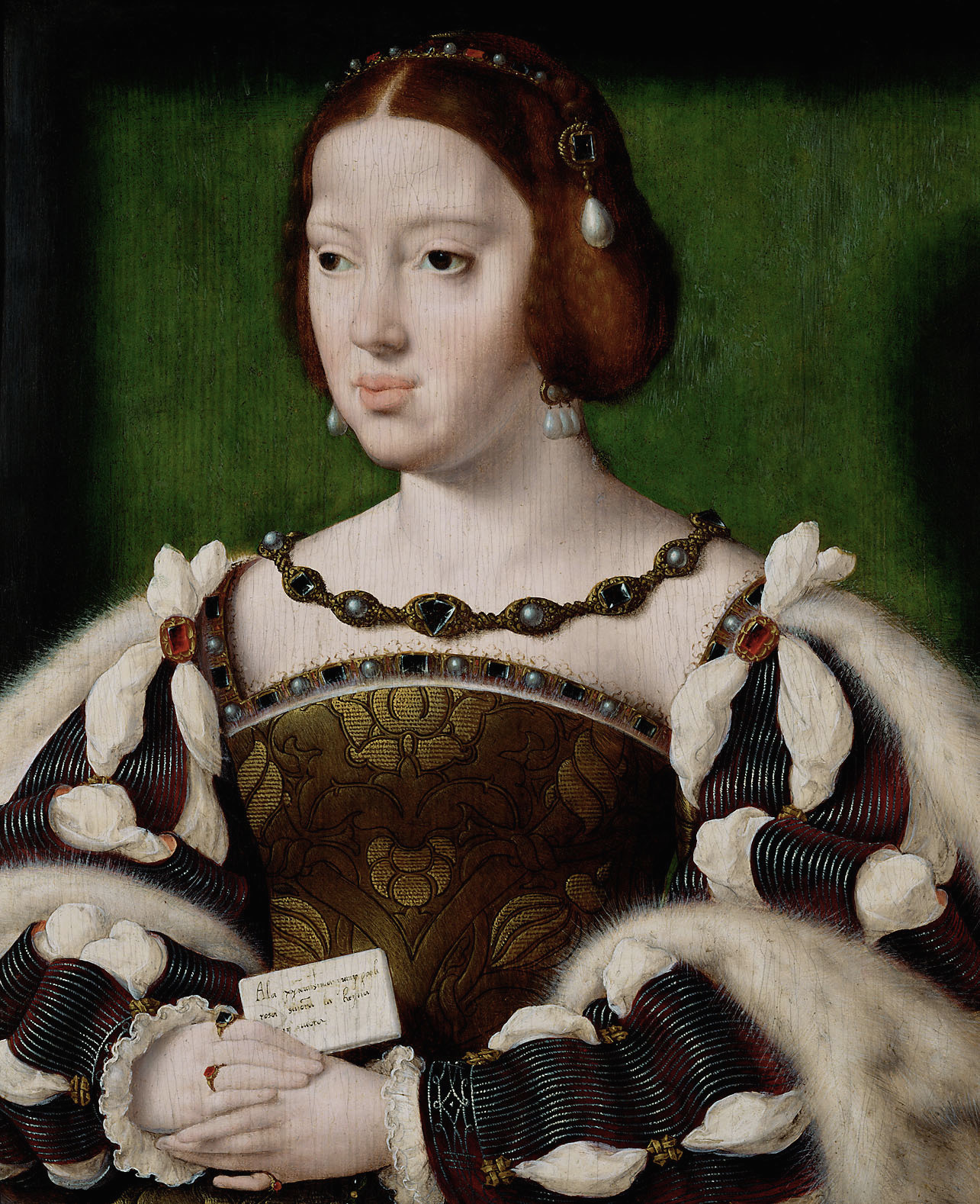
Éléonore, queen of France, ally of Montmorency, in 1530

Montmorency was close with the new bride of the king and supported her at court. He remarked that 'François should thank god for giving him so beautiful and virtuous a lady'. This was in contrast to François himself who was more infatuated with his mistress Anne de Pisseleu. Éléonore, sister to the Emperor thus had to content herself with being overshadowed. It would be Montmorency who supervised the arrangements for her coronation, which was undertaken on 5 March at Saint-Denis.

The successful outcome of the payment of the ransom and return of the king's children elevated Montmorecy in the esteem of the court with Montmorency receiving many congratulations. While the court travelled back to the capital, he went to spend some time in his estates at Chantilly.

=== Picardy ===
Charles, Duke of Vendôme in a portrait of the gallerie des illustres of château de Beauregard

After the treason of Constable Bourbon in 1523 it had become necessary for the duc de Vendôme to devote himself to affairs at court. This meant Vendôme could not fulfil his responsibilities as governor of Picardy. The Parlement of Paris demanded that the province be governed in his absence. To this end in May 1531 Montmorency's brother the seigneur de La Rochepot was appointed to fill the office. The appointment of his brother was a victory for Montmorency in his battle at court with the Admiral Chabot at a time when the hatred between the two men was barely being contained by the king. Montmorency would defend his brother's financial interests in front of the Chancellor of France and supported his methods of raising money for his role as governor at court.

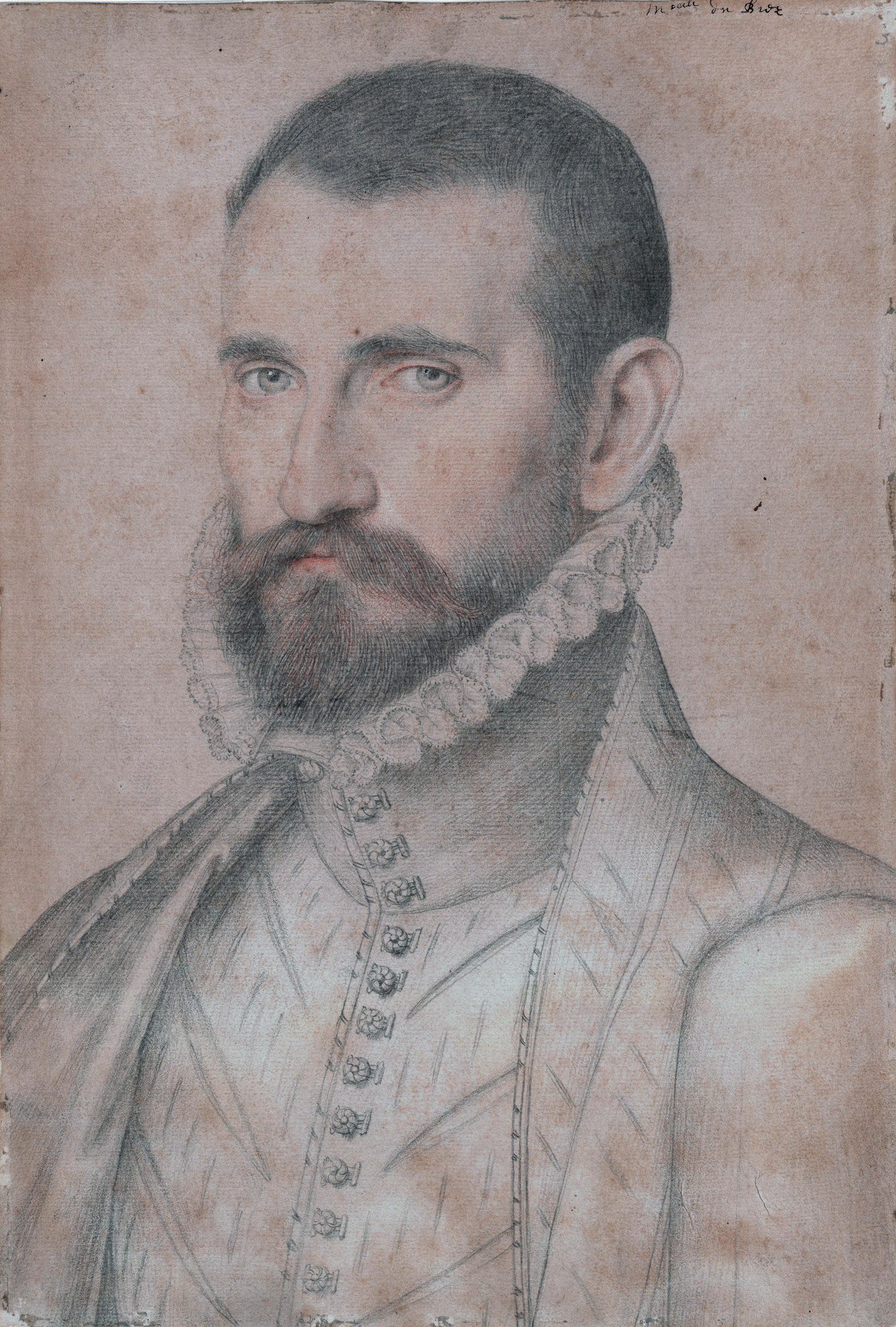
Oudard du Biez, Marshal of France and client of Montmorency in Picardy

The family's control of Picardy was aided by the presence of two Montmorency clients in subsidiary governorships, that of Péronne and Boulogne. Jean II de Humières the governor of the former accompanied Montmorency in 1527 on his embassy to England, the governor of Boulogne Oudard du Biez meanwhile received a 10,000 livres bounty thanks to the efforts of Montmorency to push the sum through the chambre des comptes (chamber of accounts). Both men reported on their efforts to raise funds for the crown in 1529, the nobility of Péronne refused to shoulder the tenth that Humières proposed, leaving the governor to write to Montmorency for advice on how to proceed. The nobility of Boulogne meanwhile offered a twentieth forcing Montmorency to write to du Biez that such a sum was not acceptable to the king. Du Biez protested that the land was ravaged by the effects of war.

As for Montmorency personally, he had lands around Boulogne, and therefore the presence of his client in the governorship of the centre aided him greatly in the extraction of revenues.

=== Diplomat ===
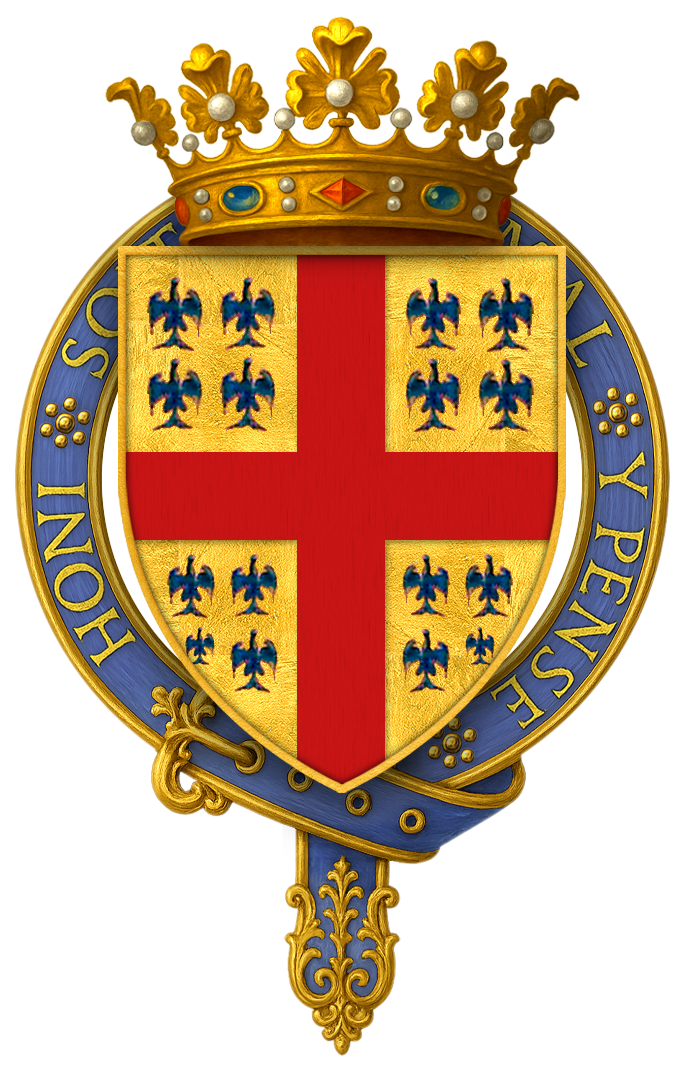
Garter Arms of Montmorency

A meeting took place in October 1532 between the English king Henry and François. Great gifts were exchanged between the two monarchs. Alongside the gifts, the duke of Norfolk and Suffolk were made chevaliers of the French Order de Saint-Michel. Meanwhile Montmorency and Chabot became knights of the Order of the Garter. Alongside the gift giving an alliance against the Ottoman Empire was established, however this was a smokescreen for their plans to resist the Emperor in Italy.

The Grand Maître had an important role to play in the marriage alliance concluded between the Papacy and France in 1533. The king's second son, the duc d'Orléans (future Henri II) was to marry the Pope's cousin Catherine de Medici, duchessa di Urbino (duchess of Urbino). Back in September 1530, when negotiations had begun for the marriage, the king had turned to Montmorency for advice on the political clauses of the marriage contract. Montmorency prepared Marseille for the Pope's arrival on 12 October to seal the union. He sailed among the Pope's flotilla as it approach the city in a frigate of his own decorated in Damask, and after greeting him on the shore, escorted the Pope and duchessa di Urbino to the king's garden near the abbey Saint-Victor where four French cardinals (Cardinal Legate Duprat, Cardinal de Bourbon, Cardinal de Lorraine and Cardinal de Gramont) and various other senior churchmen were waiting to receive him.

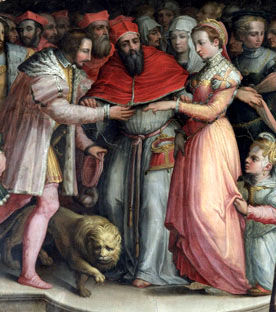
Marriage of the duc d'Orléans and duchessa di Urbino

On 26 October there was a banquet for the assembled dignitaries. The following day, the marriage contract was signed in the Pope's chambers, after which Orléans was led into an audience hall. It was Montmorency's responsibility to bring his new bride, Catherine, into the room where, after Cardinal de Bourbon affirmed the consent of both parties, Orléans kissed Catherine and the celebratory ball began.

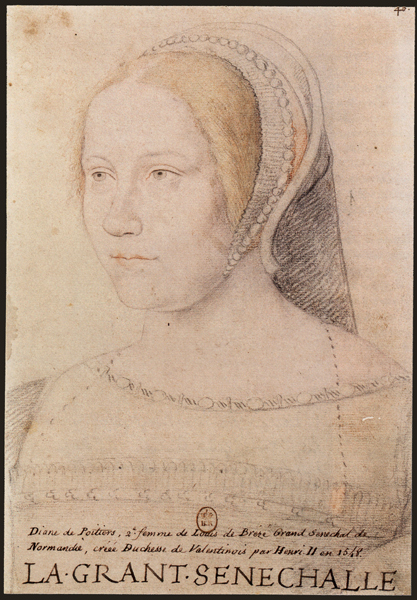
Diane de Poitiers, comtesse de Brézé and mistress of Henri II, she would politically oppose Montmorency for much of her lover's reign as king

Orléans would prove cold towards his wife, with his real romantic interests directed towards Diane de Poitiers, the comtesse de Brézé (countess of Brézé) from 1537. Montmorency had long enjoyed a close relationship with the Brézé, often taking himself up to their Château d'Anet to discuss matters of state with her and her husband Brézé. Montmorency played an important role in facilitating the young prince's romantic indiscretions, allowing for the rendezvous' to transpire at his Château d'Écouen. By 1538, Diane would however have assessed Catherine as her preferred match for Orléans, now that the alternative of the son of the duc de Guise had been suggested and therefore worked to keep her lover and his wife together. Catherine's security was further enhanced by the rivalry between Montmorency and Guise, whose attempts to introduce his daughter to the dauphin were a considerable threat to the Grand Maître's position.

An ordinance of 24 July 1534 authorised the raising of 6,000 soldiers from Picardy as a 'legion'. Montmorency was given the responsibility to raise this army, and issued commissions to the six gentleman who were to command the force. François personally inspected the raised force in an elaborate ceremony the following year. The legion would see much use in the following years, overall though the force proved ineffective and prone to ill discipline.

=== Departure from court ===
The Emperor sent the graaf van Nassau (count of Nassau) to France in October 1534 to present two proposals to the French. The first was that the duke of Milan should provide a pension to François' son Orléans in return for François renouncing his claim to Milan and Genoa. His second proposal was a marriage between the king's third son, the duc d'Angoulême and the king of England's daughter Mary. Montmorency, who received the proposals, dismissed the first out of hand, the Grand Maître writing a reaffirmation of France's claims over Milan to Nassau. Montmorency was however far less quick to dismiss the second proposal, and therefore the Emperor decided to take it further. François therefore dispatched Admiral Chabot to England with the latter proposal but received only counter-proposals from Henry and departed the country unsatisfied.

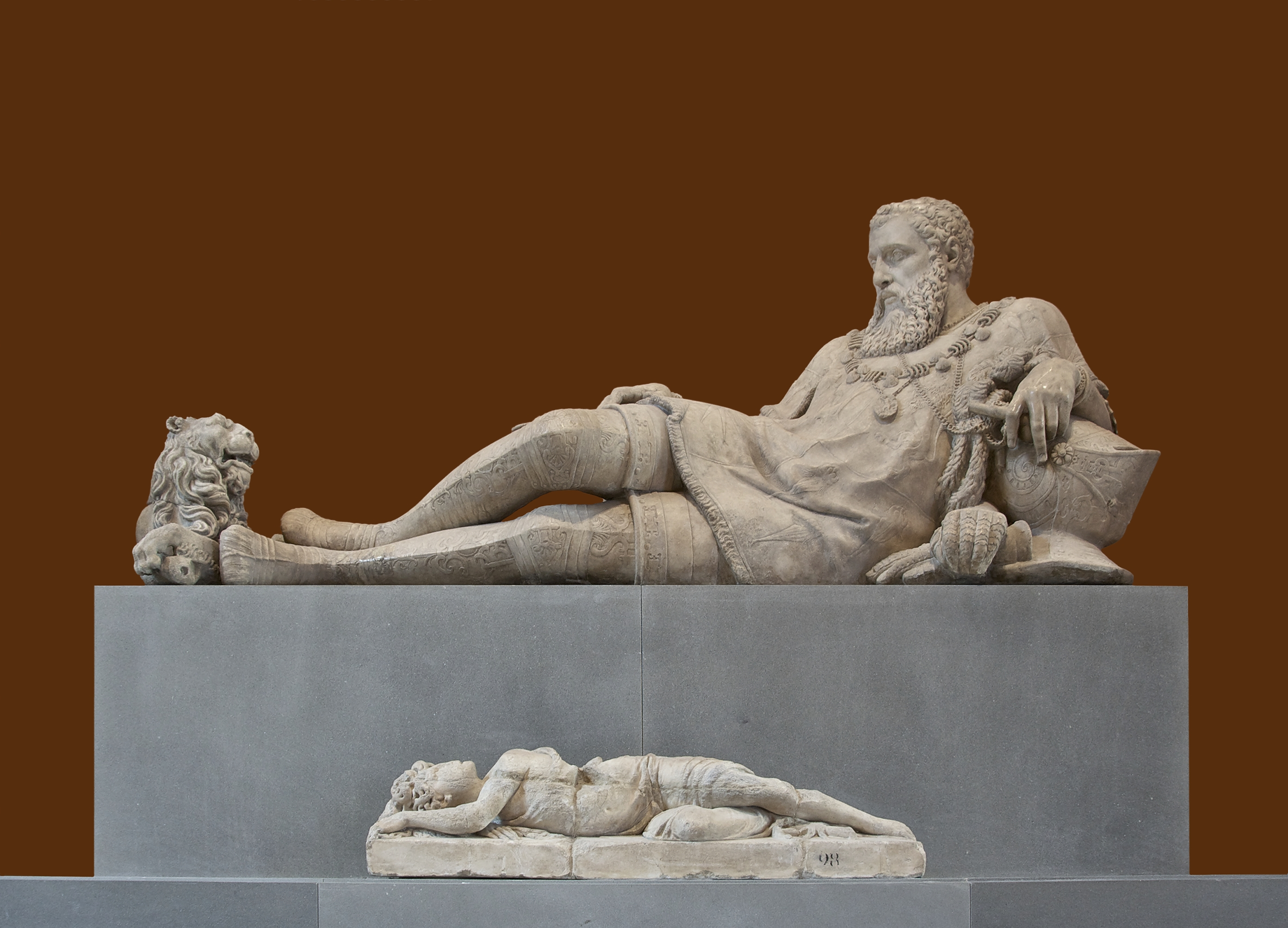
Admiral Chabot, Montmorency's great rival during the reign of François, who would gain ascendancy over Montmorency from 1541 until his death in 1543

While the Emperor was occupied with his campaign into al-Ḥafṣiyūn controlled Tunis in June 1535, François did little to take advantage of his rival's absence. Montmorency had promised the Imperial ambassador that France would not exploit the Emperor's absence. Admiral Chabot and the war party at court were incensed, and Montmorency found it necessary to retire to Chantilly, leaving Chabot ascendent by default. François could have found himself in a diplomatically challenging position if he had followed the advice of the war party to attack while the Emperor was fighting the Muslims.

His departure was not however a disgrace, and he remained in all his titles and pensions. In October he oversaw the convening of the local Languedoc Estates. He conducted an inspection of the legion of the province and ensured Narbonne's fortifications were up to an appropriate standard.

After the French seizure of Savoy in early 1536, tensions skyrocketed with the Empire, northern Italy descending into an unofficial war. Chabot was made lieutenant-general of French controlled Piedmont. However Montmorency now returned to the centre of government, arriving on 7 May. Soon thereafter Chabot was removed as lieutenant-general of Piedmont, replaced by the marchese di Saluzzo (marquis of Saluzzo). Saluzzo would not long be the French lieutenant-general as he defected to the Empire on 17 May. Humières became the lieutenant-general of Dauphiné, Savoy and Piedmont, meanwhile the Emperor decided to invade Provence. A day after his decision to launch an invasion on 14 July Montmorency was made 'lieutenant-general' on both sides of the mountains with powers that included troop mobilisation, the command of the forces on the ground and the ability to negotiate peace.

=== Provence campaign ===
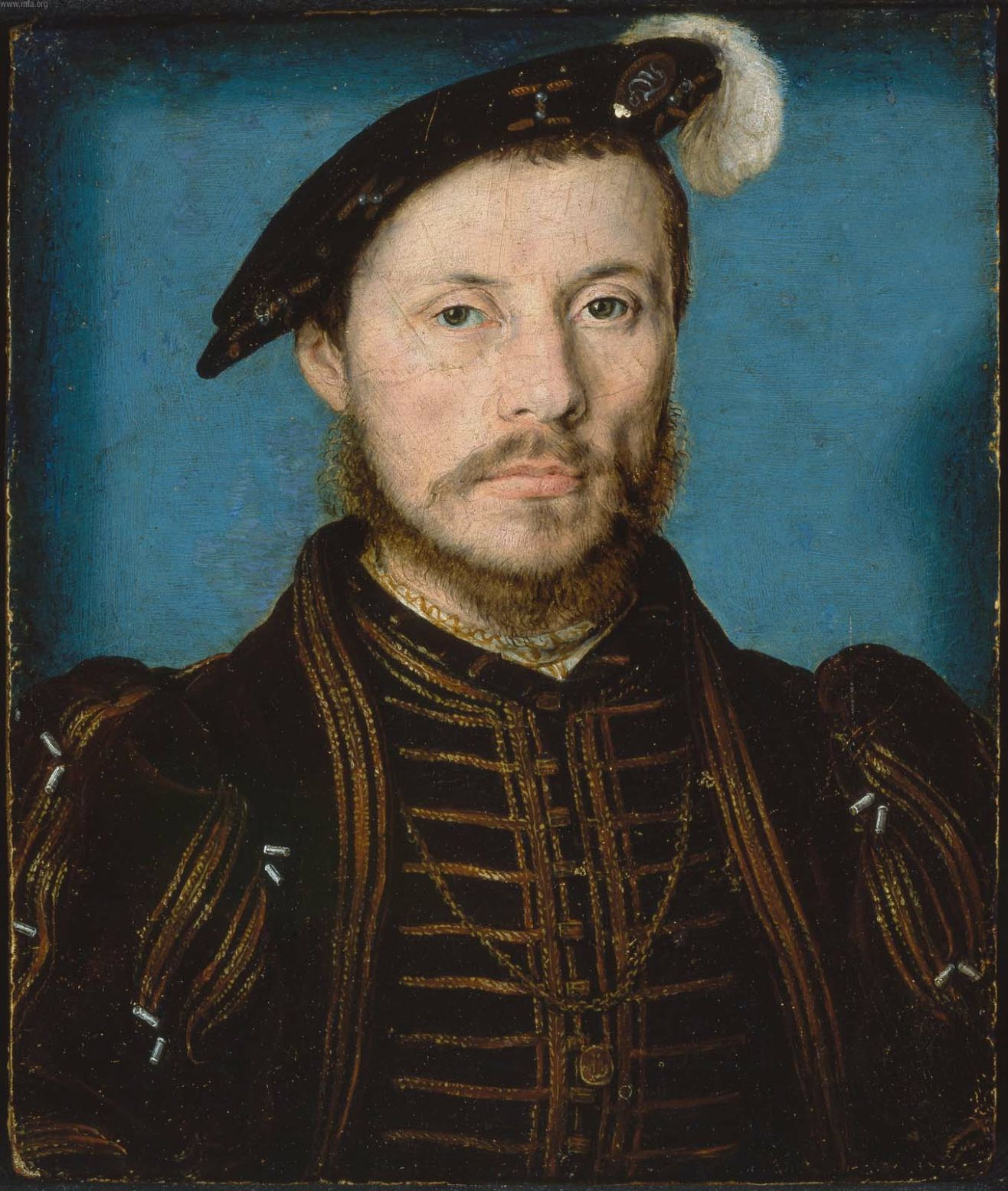
Montmorency either in 1533 or 1536

On 24 July 1536, an Imperial army, under the command of the Emperor invaded France from Italy, proceeding by the coast through Nice, crossing into the kingdom at Var. Concurrently an army under the graaf van Nassau invaded Picardy. Montmorency led the defence of the south, and François' attentions were focused in that direction. The king's council successfully convinced him not to lead the army, and leave it to the command of Montmorency. Montmorency's force assembled at Avignon, and by 25 July totalled 30,000 men. A month later this had ballooned to 60,000. Montmorency adopted a scorched earth strategy and devastated the lands of Provence to deny his enemy supply. He inspected the fortifications of Aix and Marseille and determining that Aix's were inadequate without at least a month's work and 6000 soldiers, he therefore had Aix evacuated. Marseille by contrast had recently been reinforced and had played a key role in the defeat of Bourbon's invasion in 1524, and therefore was not subjected to the destruction that was put upon Aix. The Emperor's goal was the capture of Marseille, and towards this end he captured Aix on 13 August. All roads to Marseille were blocked by French forces, and as his army sat near Aix it began to collapse to disease. The army was also in great want of food and water which they struggled to acquire in the devastated landscape. Foraging parties that sought to acquire food were sometimes set upon and butchered. By 2 September 1536, Montmorency estimated the Emperor had lost over 7000 men to dysentery and famine. The new dauphin Orléans (François' second son) received permission from François to join the army in the defence of Provence. By 11 September Charles decided to withdraw from Provence and Nassau made a similar decision up in Picardy around the same time. The invasions had been a failure. François joined the army at this time, but decided against ordering a pursuit, contenting himself to ordering a harassment of the retreating army by the light cavalry.

In the spring of 1537, Montmorency engaged in a campaign on the northern frontier of France, and was rewarded with great successes. The king had declared Artois, Flanders and Charolais which he had ceded in the peace of Cambrai to be confiscated in January, and tasked Montmorency with advancing in the north. To this end Montmorency was made lieutenant-general with the responsibility to recover Saint-Pol and Artois. Montmorency and François captured Auxy-le-Château, then besieged Hesdin. On 6 May Saint-Pol was occupied by the royal army, threatening the Imperial supply line through Lens and Arras. Montmorency prepared to disband the army and send 10,000 soldiers to join Humières in Picardy. While demobilisation was ongoing, the Emperor launched a lightning offensive, threatening to surround Thérouanne. Saint-Pol and Montreuil fell quickly back to the Emperor. François dispatched Orléans the new dauphin to join Montmorency and conduct a counter-offensive, the young prince arriving in mid-June. A cavalry force under the duc de Guise also arrived to bolster the royal forces in Picardy. Montmorency was pleased with the effect the dauphin had on the army. In July they secured a favourable truce in the theatre and prepared to move south to where the war was continuing in Piemdmont, Montreuil had been successfully regained and Thérouanne would remain in French hands; only the conquest of Saint-Pol had been reversed.

François had orchestrated a counter-offensive back into Italy in 1537, though with many troops tied up in other theatres it was limited in scope. A small army under the command of Humières, the lieutenant-general of French Piedmont had invaded Piedmont in April 1537 and made an unsuccessful attempt on Asti, and successful attempts on Alba and Cherasco. François secured a truce in the northern theatre thanks to the efforts of Montmorency and Orléans so that he might bring force to bear on Italy, in the meanwhile he urged Humières to hold firm and dismantle fortifications he could not hold. The Imperial commander del Vasto had little intention of waiting around for a new French army to show up, and began a counter offensive.

=== Entry into Piedmont ===
Montmorency arrived in Lyon, and was established by the king as the new lieutenant-general of French Piedmont. He had with him a force of 10,000 French infantry, 10,000 Italians, 14,000 Swiss, 12,000 landsknechts and 1,400 men-at-arms. The force was technically under the command of the dauphin Orléans, but Montmorency led the army in actuality. By this time, October, France only held Turin, Pinerolo and Savigliano in Piedmont, the towns were being besieged by del Vasto. Montmorency left Besançon on 23 October towards the pass de Susa which was held by Cesare Maggi with 6,000 men. Montmorency forced the passage. This success caused del Vasto to break off his sieges of the final French held towns and cities. The combined French army then began sieging back the towns of Piedmont, with François himself joining the army soon thereafter. He had by now had success in negotiations with the Emperor, and wanted to secure as much of Piedmont as possible prior to a truce coming into force. By November del Vasto had been compelled to retreat across the Po. On 27 November 1537 a three month truce was declared in Italy, del Vasto and Montmorency met to discuss the minutiae and agreed that each side would maintain in Italy the troops necessary to garrison their respective towns, and send other forces away.

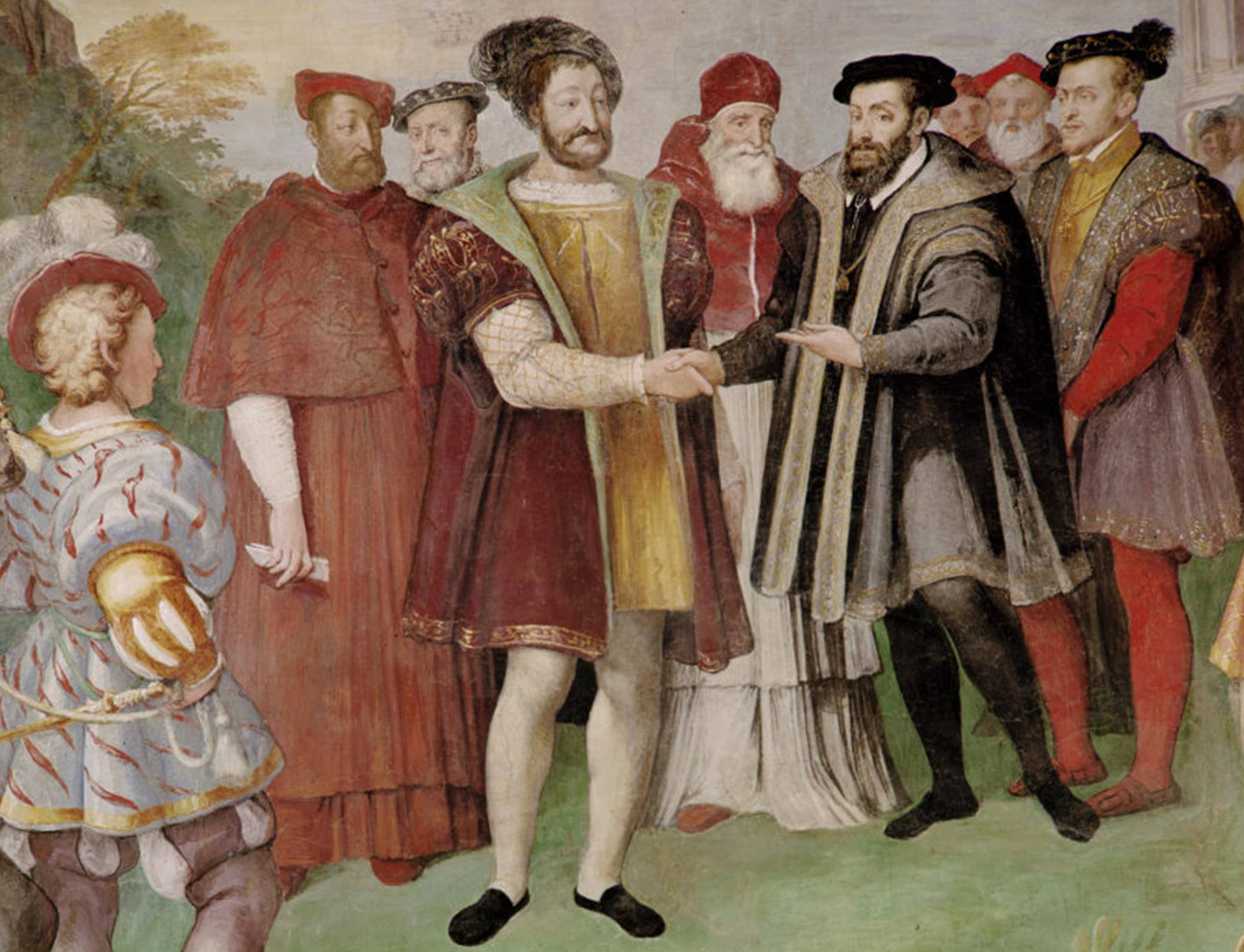
François and the Emperor meet for the Truce of Nice

This truce would last more than three months, being twice extended while the two sides argued over the specific arrangements of control that a more permanent peace settlement would entail in Italy. Montmorency and the Cardinal de Lorraine met with envoys of the Emperor at Leucate and agreed that the duchy of Milan would be given to the king's third son the duc de Angoulême as a dowry for his marriage to the daughter of the Emperor. However dispute arose between the king and Emperor over how many years the king would be able to administer the duchy for his son. Unable to achieve a consensus over the destiny of Milan, François and the Emperor compromised by agreeing to an extension of the truce for 10 years, during which time each side was to maintain what they currently possessed. Montmorency provided assurance that neither party would ever declare war over claims to Milan again. While the talks were ongoing, Montmorency directed a young Monluc, future Marshal of France to spy on the fortifications of Perpignan.

The king was greatly pleased with Montmorency, and met with him in Montpellier on 31 January 1538 to provide him his pay for the campaign, which totalled 158,000 écus, the court thronged around to celebrate him upon his entry to Lyon.

== Ascendency ==
=== Constable ===
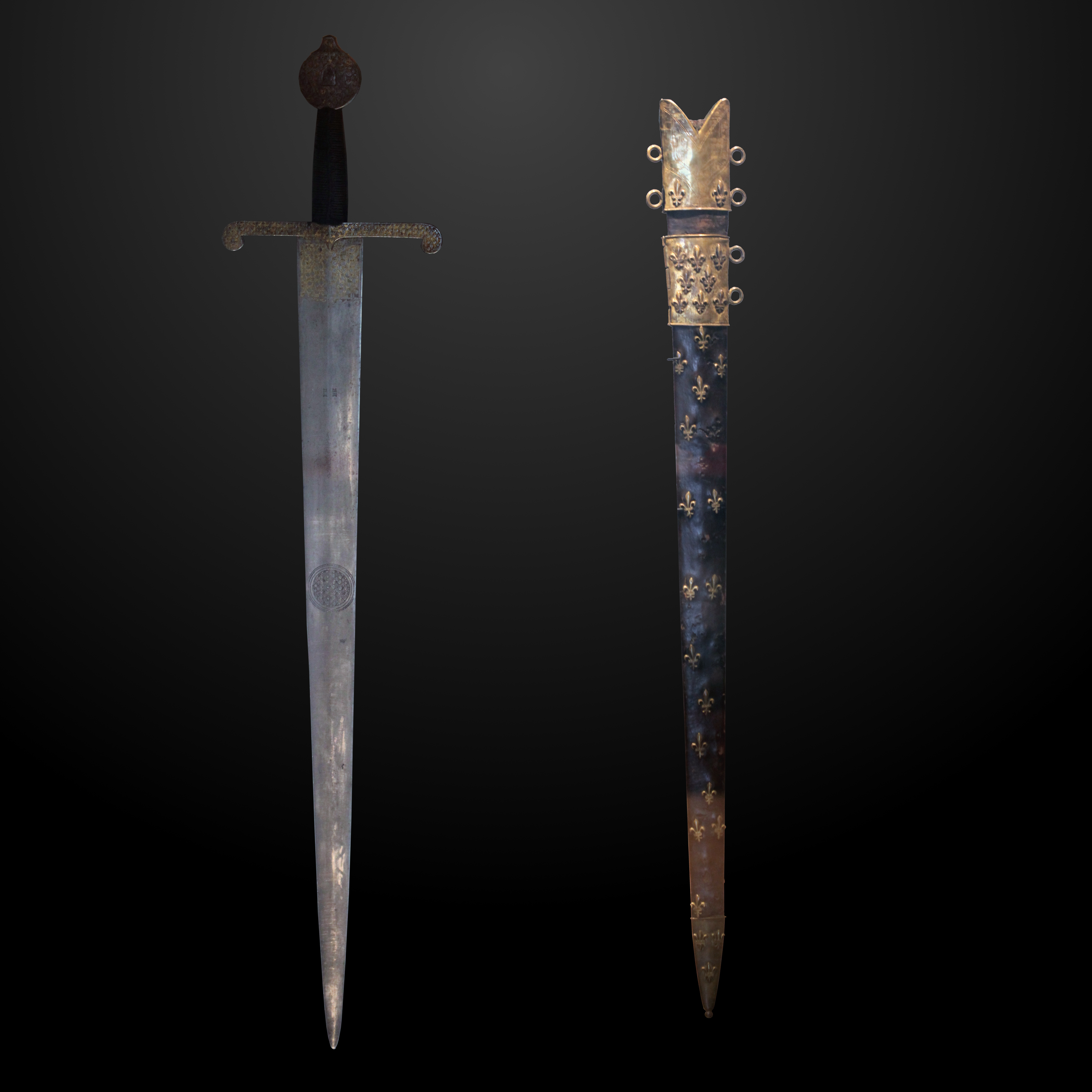
Sword of the office of Constable

On 10 February 1538 several important appointments were declared by the king which benefitted the Montmorency family. His brother La Rochepot was appointed governor of the Île de France and therefore departed from his charge in Picardy. Most importantly however, Montmorency was established as Constable of France. The office had been left vacant since the treason of Constable Bourbon. In a ceremony on that day, ironically celebrated at a château that had once belonged to Bourbon, Montmorency was escorted by the sister of the king, the queen of Navarre from the king's private chambers to the great hall, where the king gave him the sword of the office. The Constable of France was the most senior commander of the French military, and he and the Marshals of France, whose concurrent number would total four by the 1560s held overall responsibility for France's land forces. On the battlefield the Constable outranked even princes du sang, and had the right to lead the vanguard even when the king was present. The most prestigious elements of the military under his authority were the gendarmerie of heavy cavalry, which was composed of ordinance companies of 30-100 men-at-arms. By this time, the French military possessed continually standing components, which greatly contributed to the kingdom's tax burden. The Constable also enjoyed advantageous apartments in the royal residence of Saint-Germain-en-Laye, right next to those of the king and queen. By this appointment, Montmorency effectively became lieutenant-general of the kingdom.

As Montmorency was ascending to the office of Constable he was no longer a Marshal, and therefore the king appointed two new Marshals, Claude d'Annebault and René de Montjean.

His elevation to the office of Constable was in part a reward for his leadership in the defence of France against the invasion of Provence that had been conducted in 1536. The great benefits he received from the king also felt like a victory to the dauphin, who saw them as a reward for his own successes on campaign, throughout which Montmorency and Orléans had become very close. During the campaign Orléans had undertaken an affair with Filippa Duci which had resulted in a pregnancy. Montmorency was informed of this and ordered that she be watched for the duration of the pregnancy, and kept the dauphin appraised with updates, filling the young man with pride. The child of this affair, Diane de France would first be married to the duke of Castro, grandson of Pope Paul III, with the marriage contract signed for the king by Montmorency, Aumale and the chancellor Olivier. The Pope committed to providing his grandson 200,000 écus to spend on land in France, and the duchy of Castro. After Castro's death, Diane would go on to marry Montmorency's eldest son.

=== Milan ===
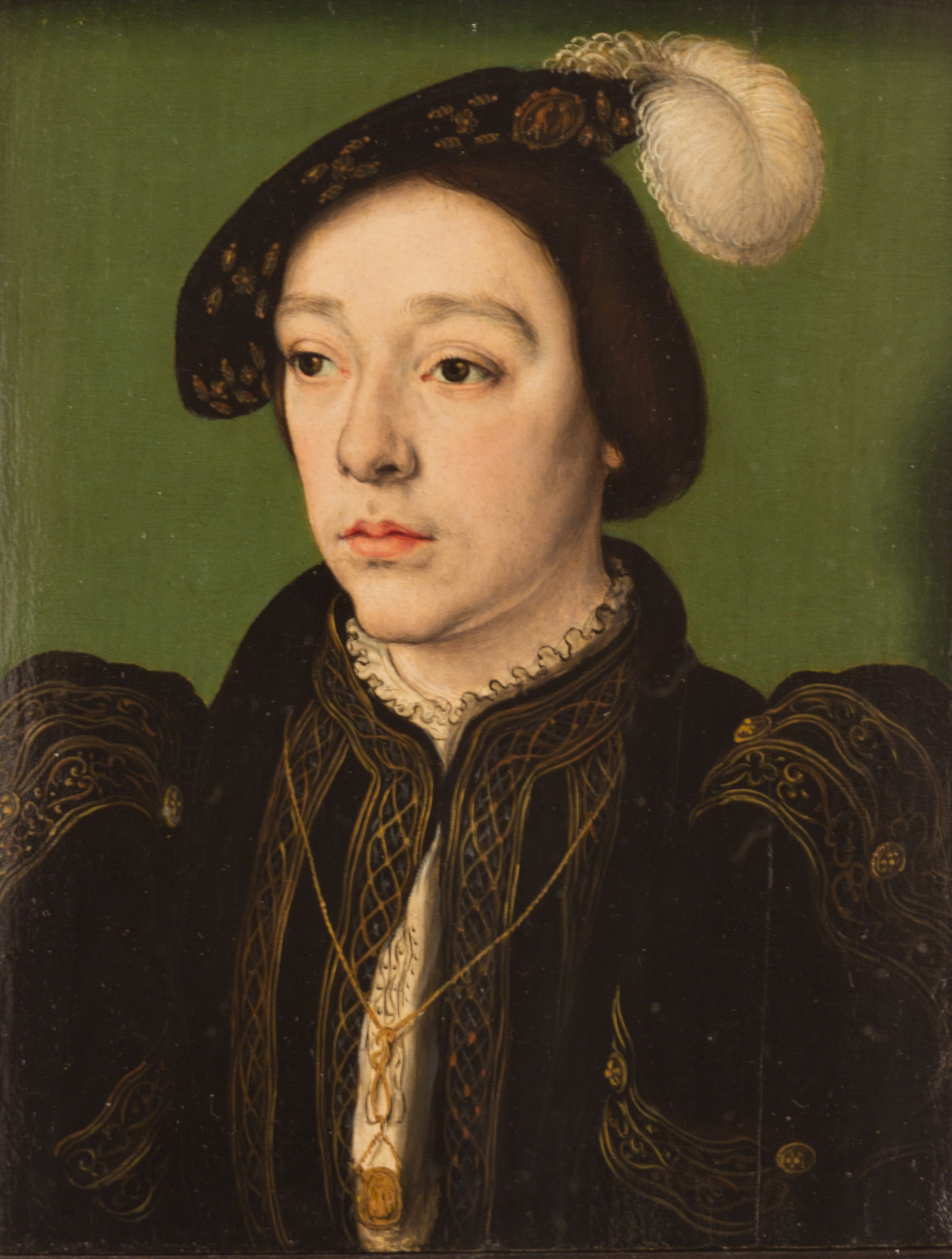
Duc d'Angoulême, third son of François. The failure to secure Milan as his dowry ensured Montmorency's disgrace

In July of 1538, talks were conducted between the Emperor and king of France at Aigues-Mortes. For these important discussions Montmorency was among those granted an Imperial audience. The devolution of Milan to Angoulême was again discussed, in return for François committing France to a war against the Osmanlı İmparatorluğu. The two men agreed to co-operate going forward in the 'defence of Christendom' and reunification of the church behind Catholicism. Montmorency was delighted at the success of the meeting, which astonishing contemporaries insofar as the two bitter adversaries now appeared to be friends. While some at court were sceptical of this new friendship, Montmorency assured the court that the peace between the two men would last their entire lives. For his part, Montmorency ensured that France honoured the truce with the Empire.

Montmorency would be completely ascendent in the direction of French foreign policy for the next two years. His desire was to secure Milan for France, but through diplomatic means. All ambassadors wrote to him alongside the king. He recognised that to best achieve his goal, he needed to be in a position of strength with the Empire, and therefore sought to consolidate the French position in Piedmont and Savoy. Parlements and Chambre des comptes (chamber of accounts) were established in each of the occupied regions. Fortification was also undertaken of the key city of Piedmont, Turin, while the northern border was simultaneously fortified by Montmorency's brother La Rochepot.

As Constable of France, Montmorency was approached by foreign kingdoms that wished to do business with France. To this end in 1539 he received a request from the English court for the provision of 60,000 m^{2} of hemp fabric. This would have been sufficient to supply 100 great ships. In response it was 'diplomatically' protested that France lacked the capacity to fulfil such an order.

It was through the protection and patronship of Montmorency, that Saint-André received the charges of lieutenant-general and governor of Lyon in 1539.

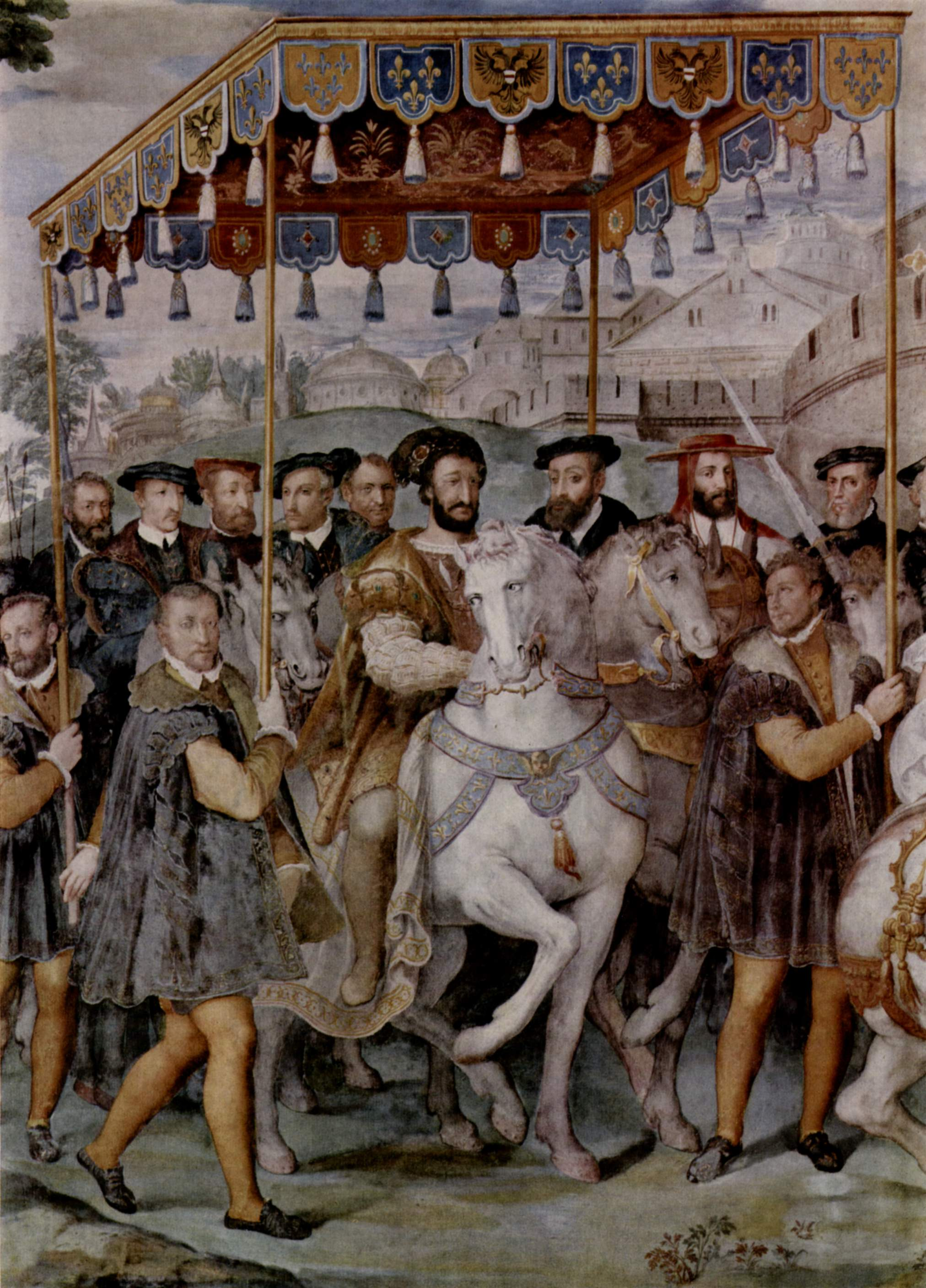
Ceremonial entry into Paris of King François and Emperor Charles V

Montmorency was again leaned upon for diplomatic purposes when François sought further peace talks with the Emperor in 1539. Montmorency organised the receptions for the Emperor which involved ceremonial entries into many cities as the Imperial party progressed through the country. The Emperor was received at the Château de Fontainebleau for Christmas. The Constable enjoyed his own apartments on the first floor at Fontainebleau. Upon the party's entry into Paris on 1 January 1540, the Emperor entered the city under a canopy, Montmorency proceeding him, holding the sword of his office aloft.

After some time together, Montmorency accompanied the Emperor back to the border, taking leave of the king at Saint-Quentin. Montmorency and the king's sons escorted the Emperor as far as Valenciennes. They brought back gifts from the town to the French court. It was generally assumed that Montmorency and the Cardinal de Lorraine would shortly be called to Bruxelles for a more formal deal, however the Emperor became distracted by the revolt of Ghent. Rumours began to swirl that the understanding between France and the Empire had broken down, which Montmorency derided as 'jealous talk'. In March the Emperor revealed that he had changed his mind about the provision of Milan as a dowry for François' third son. Instead, he suggested a dowry of the Netherlands, Burgundy and the Charolais for the young prince. François would not receive Milan, and would have to withdraw from Piedmont and Savoy as part of this deal. Further, the lands would be administered under the Emperors' supervision and if his daughter María died without issue, the territory would revert to the Habsburg male line.

=== Path to disgrace ===
Upon receipt of this news François, Montmorency and Orléans locked themselves in a room for a long discussion. When it was concluded, Montmorency retired unwell to bed for several days. François delivered his reply to the Emperor in which he argued the Netherlands was a poor substitute for Milan which was his by right anyway. Moreover the instant gratification of Milan could not compare to a territory he would have to wait many years to receive. He later altered his reply to say that he would accept the Netherlands instead, but only if he received it immediately: the reversion clause could remain but only if Milan was given in compensation for the loss of the Netherlands. By June 1540 talks had collapsed entirely.

While still in a degree of favour, Montmorency engineered the disgrace of his long time enemy Admiral Chabot. Back in 1538 he enjoyed a position as the patron of the young duc d'Aumale who wrote to him that he might he was as much at Montmorency's command as were his own children. Aumale remained on positive terms with him in 1541 describing himself as Montmorency's 'very humble servant'. Aumale's father, the duc de Guise would remain cordial with Montmorency throughout the Constable's period of disgrace. In later years, Aumale would become the great rival of Montmorency as a favourite of the king in his capacity as the duc de Guise.

Around this time, Montmorency became aware his influence was beginning to slip with the king. In the hopes of buttressing his authority, he attempted to play upon François' hatred of subversion. To this end he shared with the king the sonnets of Vittoria Colonna (who was sympathetic to Protestantism), which he informed the king had been sent to his sister. However the queen of Navarre was able to gain the upper hand in this dispute. François continued to erode Montmorency's civic responsibilities, getting him to hand over the keys to the Louvre which he possessed in his capacity as Grand Maître.

In this first stage of his disgrace, he was removed from influence over diplomatic affairs, which were granted to Tournon. This removal occurred in April 1540, but he remained in overall favour with François who remarked that the Constable's only fault was that he did not 'love those who I love'. French foreign policy was now back in the hands of the war party at court, and François privately boasted of his plans for a new war against the Emperor.

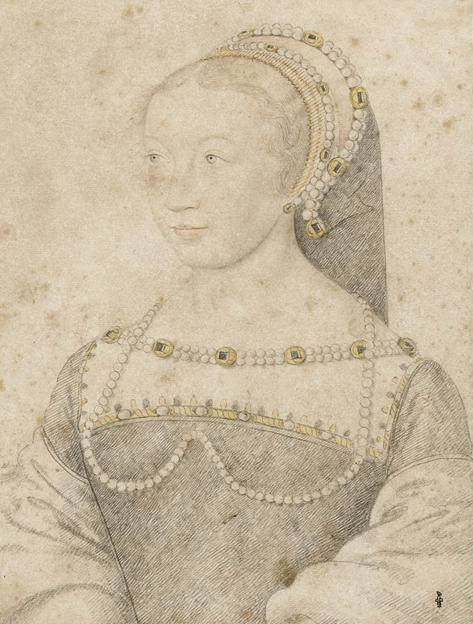
Duchesse d'Étampes, one of Montmorency's rivals at court, who helped bring about his disgrace in 1541

On 11 October 1540, the Holy Roman Emperor decided to award the duchy of Milan to his son, the future Philip II of Spain. Thus, François was to give up all his conquests in Italy, and reconstitute the defunct duchy of Burgundy which had been integrated into the royal domain as a dowry to be gifted by the Emperor to his son. François was enraged at the betrayal, and took out his frustrations on Montmorency. It was Montmorency, François alleged, who had allowed the Emperor to present this diplomatic embarrassment to him. Montmorency was forced to withdraw from court when the news arrived.

Not a month had passed since this news arrived in France than the king forbade his secretaries to use the cyphers Montmorency had provided them. Montmorency, believing himself disgraced, asked François for permission to retire from court but François told him he still had use of his services. Indeed he staged something of a revival in his fortunes in early 1541, with the Imperial ambassador reporting that his credit had increased. It was ephemeral, by April he was reported to be at the mercy of the king's mistress, the duchess d'Étampes at court, his credit decreasing daily. Fully aware of this, Montmorency advised the lieutenant-general of Piedmont Langey to send his correspondence to Marshal Annebault in future.

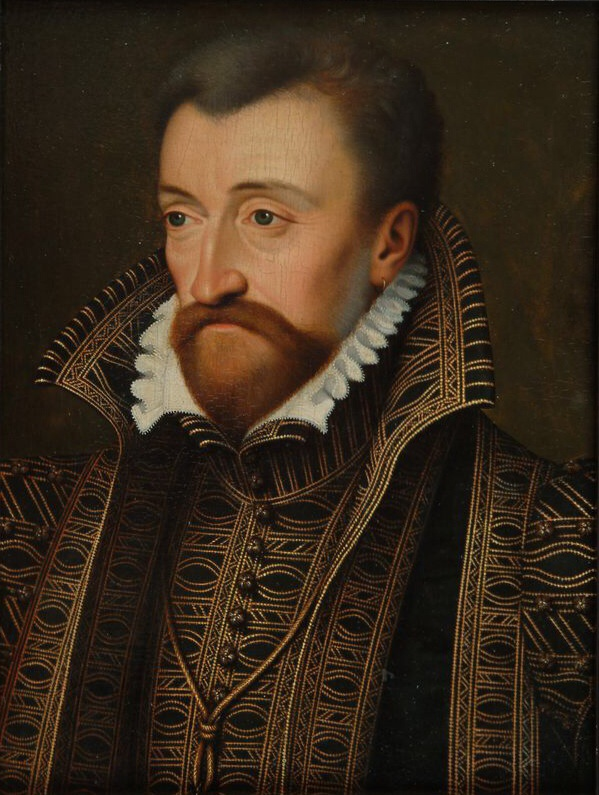
Antoine de Bourbon, duc de Vendôme then jure uxoris king of Navarre, he would become lieutenant-general of France in 1561 and ally with Montmorency's Catholic 'Triumvirate' at the outbreak of the French Wars of Religion

In June 1541 the king humiliated Montmorency through a request he made at the wedding of Jeanne d'Albret, the daughter of the queen of Navarre and the duke of Jülich-Cleves-Berg. Jeanne refused (or was unable) to walk to the altar for the ceremony, and therefore the king commanded Montmorency to carry her to the altar. The court was shocked that such a high ranking man as Montmorency had been ordered to undertake such a demeaning task, and Montmorency remarked to his nearby friends 'this is the end of my favour, I am saying goodbye to it'. The day after the wedding, he left court, and would not return during the lifetime of François.

== Disgrace ==
=== Governate revoked ===
On 21 May 1542, François abolished all governorships in France, and ordered the people of France not to obey their ex-governors' commands. He justified this on the grounds that their powers had become excessive. In the following weeks he proceeded to re-appoint every former governor of the provinces with the exception of Montmorency who was replaced in Languedoc. The initial abolition is therefore understood to be an attack on Montmorency disguised in a general dismissal due to his power making a specific dismissal unfeasible politically.

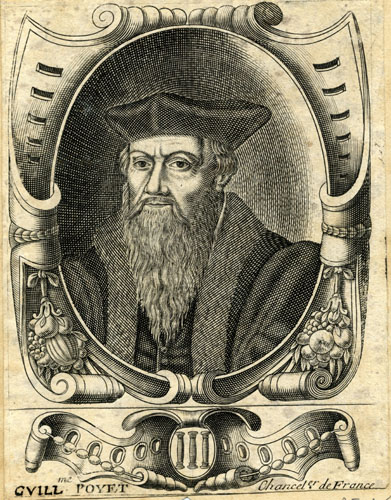
Guillaume Poyet, Chancellor of France and client of Montmorency, disgraced in 1542

With his disgrace, Montmorency was no longer able to protect his political clients - this led to the disgrace of the chancellor of France Poyet in 1542. Conversely, Admiral Chabot was rehabilitated, and returned to a central place at the French court.

=== Dauphin's party ===
During his time of disgrace Montmorency was absent from the court. However, he remained close with the dauphin the duke of Brittany (formerely the duc d'Orléans), while the duc d'Orléans (formerly the duc d'Angoulême) allied himself with the king's mistress the duchesse d'Étampes. Also in the faction of the dauphin were the queen and most of the French cardinals. Brittany would ask the king to recall Montmorency so that he could serve with him in the campaigns against the Imperials, however this was refused. With Brittany and Orléans in opposition to one another, each man represented a centre of their respective faction; this dynamic would however be radically altered by the sudden death of Orléans in 1545. Brittany felt keenly the absence of his mentor from the centre of power.

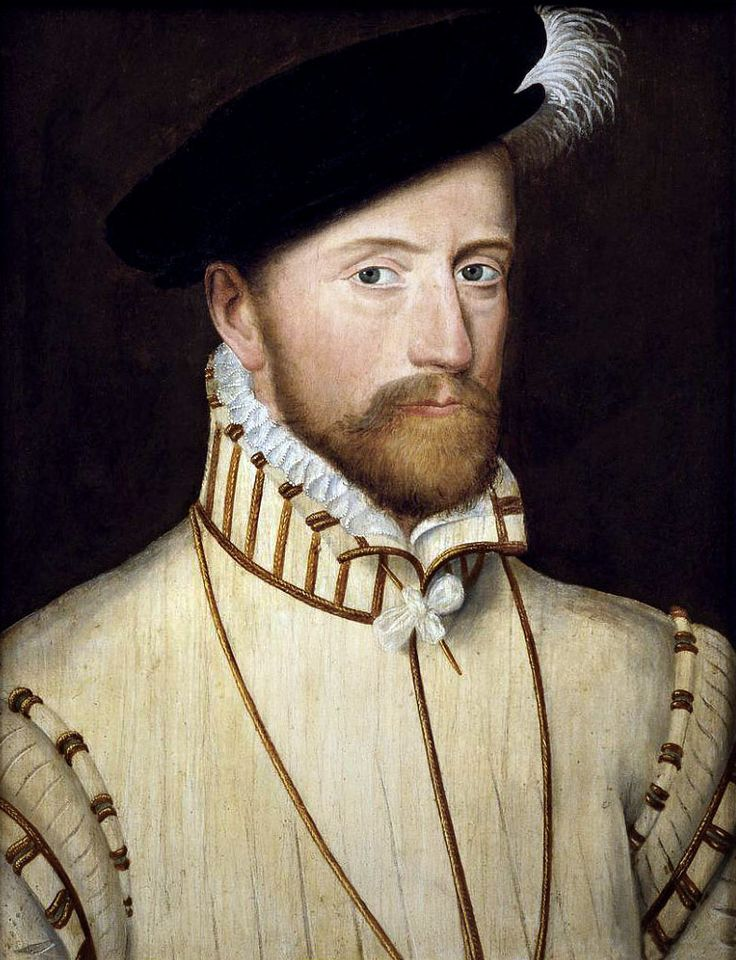
Jacques d'Albon, seigneur de Saint-André, another of Henri II's principal favourites who would be made Marshal and premier gentilhomme de la chambre du roi upon the new king's ascent

These years would be ones of retirement for the Constable, and it was only with the death of the king that he returned to holding political influence himself. As early as 1546, Brittany began to anticipate his coming reign, and to this end, planned the division of offices that would go to his various favourites upon his ascent. Montmorency would be recalled from disgrace, Saint-André made Premier Chambellan (first chamberlain) and Brissac established as Grand Maître de l'artillerie (grand-master of the artillery). Reports of these speculative appointments was delivered to François by the court jester, and he flew into a rage when he heard of his son's presumptuousness. He advanced on his son's chambers with the captain of his Scots guard and broke the door down, finding no one inside he had the furniture destroyed. Shortly thereafter the remaining partisans of Brittany were expelled from the court.

Not all those who allied with Brittany in the final years of François' reign were to profit as completely as Montmorency and Saint-André. Another favourite, Dampierre ended in the dauphin's disgrace for daring to attack his mistress Diane de Poitiers, others died in battle or judicial duels.

As he lay dying, François summoned Brittany to his bedside. Father implored son not to recall Montmorency from his disgrace, and to trust in the men the king had surrounded himself with since 1541, chief among them Tournon and Annebault.

== Return to the centre ==
=== Palace revolution ===
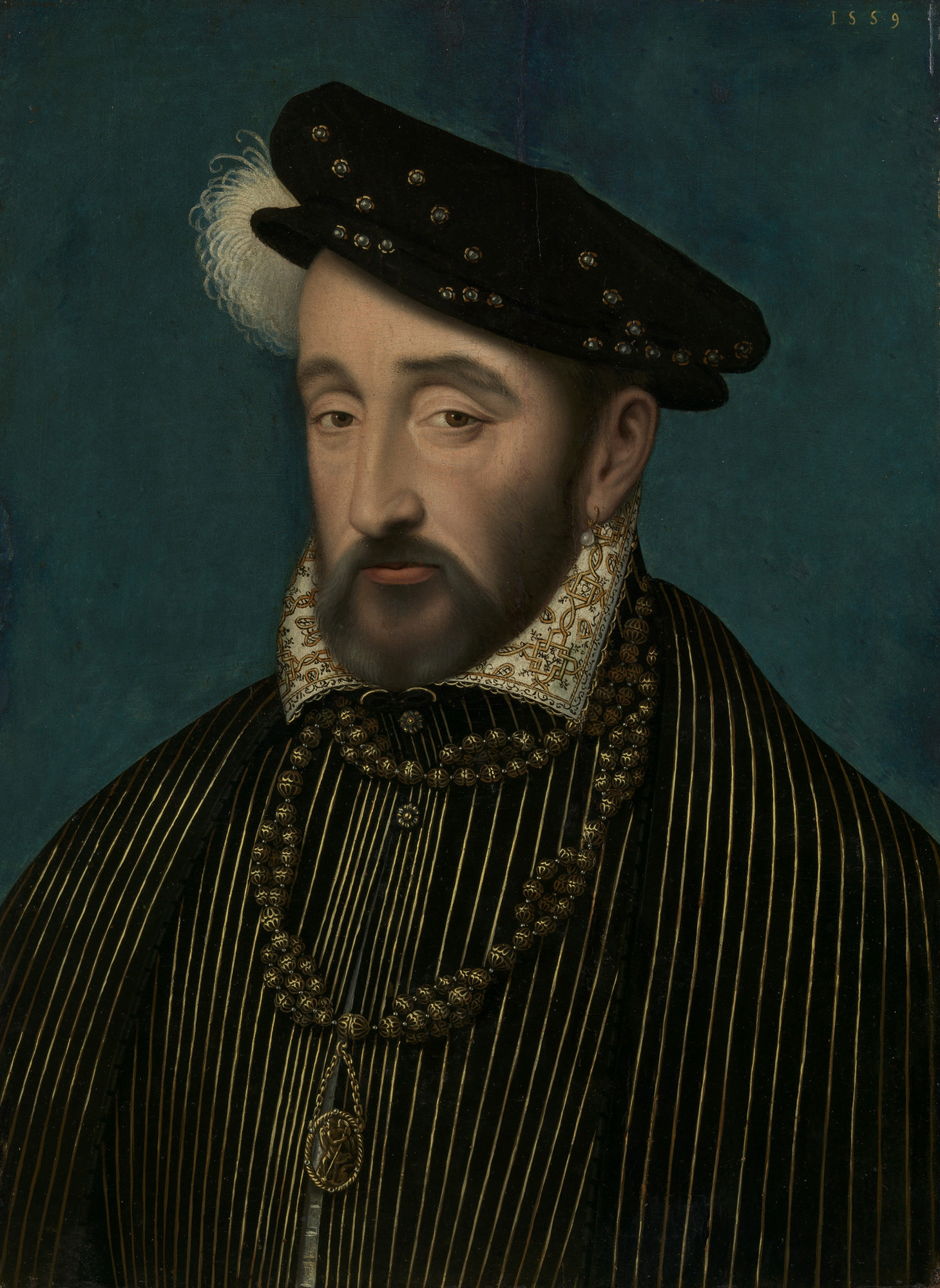
Henri II who succeeded François to the throne, a long time friend and ally of Montmorency

François I of France died around 14:00 on 31 March 1547. While those in the room were still mourning, the dauphin Brittany, now styled King Henri II dashed off letters summoning Diane and Montmorency to come to court. Montmorency's recall was therefore rapid, and he was invited to join Henri at Saint-Germain. The two engaged in a 2 hour conference on 1 April during which Montmorency and the king engaged in a complete reorganisation of the government. After the meeting Montmorency received the apartments of François' former mistress the duchesse d'Étampes at Saint-Germain. Holding court here, he received the flocks of condolences that poured in for the recently departed king.

Montmorency assumed the position that had been jointly occupied by Admiral Annebault and Cardinal de Tournon in leading the administration of François in the king's final years. Both men were dispossessed of their charges that evening. Annebault was allowed to remain Admiral, however he would no longer be paid, in much the same way as Montmorency had maintained his charge of Constable without pay during his disgrace. He was further obliged to surrender his Marshal office to Saint-André. Montmorency became commander of the royal armies and the lynchpin of the royal council almost immediately. His proximity with the new king was such that he even shared the king's bed on occasion during 1547, a practice which shocked some contemporaries. The ambassador of Ferrara remarked on the matter with revulsion. His establishment as head of the administration was represented by his resumption of the offices of Constable and Grand Maître which he had enjoyed in former years. The duchesse d'Étampes, enemy of both Montmorency and Henri was banished from court. Montmorency also received the arrears of pay he would have been owed if not for his disgrace.

With great pride Montmorency remarked on a different incident of intimacy with the king where Henri had entered his chambers while he was receiving a footbath. The Constable bragged about the event to Saint-André, who in turn told the duc d'Aumale. According to the ambassador of Ferrara, Aumale was mortified, keenly aware the king would never make such shows of intimacy with him. One of the king's favourite horses, Compère was a gift from Montmorency.

Montmorency was restored to the governate of Languedoc, and his brother La Rochepot was restored to his office as governor of the Île de France and Paris. His eldest nephew Cardinal de Châtillon received rich new benefices among them Beauvais. Montmorency received the charge for the second time on 12 April 1547. Keen to reward his favourite, the return of his governate came with back-pay for the years in which he had been denied his possession of Languedoc, totalling 100,000 écus in addition to the annual income of 25,000 écus he would receive going forward. In sum Henri distributed 800,000 livres among his three great favourites (Montmorency, Aumale, and Saint-André) upon his ascent, which was raised by a tax of two tenths upon the clergy.

On 12 April the king received Montmorency's oath in his capacity as Constable of France, with the king declaring that all civil and military officials were to be subordinated to him. He also restored the exercise of his old lesser charges, that of captain of the forts of Bastille, Vincennes, Saint-Malo and Nantes.

Until at least 1552, all ambassadors to France presented their credentials to Montmorency before they were received by the king.

Back in favour, Montmorency advanced his nephews once more, with Coligny being elevated to the position of colonel-general of the French infantry within a month of Henri's accession. Over the following years of Henri's reign, Coligny would be made Admiral of France, governor of Picardy and governor of the Île de France. Through advancement of his nephews Montmorency secured his own power.

At the centre of power once more, Montmorency was again able to be a distributor of royal favour to a network of patronage. As such he was soon approached by the queen of Navarre who was seeking to re-enter royal favour. The two had a frosty relationship. This meant that when in 1548 the king became suspicious that the queen and her husband the king of Navarre were intriguing with the Emperor, Henri turned to Montmorency, who had his agents intercept all mail addressed to the couple for several months. In 1556 suspicions would again arise at court as to the potentially treasonous actions of the new king of Navarre and his wife with the Emperor over Spanish Navarre. The king of Navarre wrote to Henri and Montmorency, hoping to recharacterize his dealings in a less dangerous light. The queen of Navarre wrote to Montmorency separately, urging him to maintain the good relations he enjoyed with Navarre.

=== Push for war ===
Despite the centrality of his position in the new administration, Montmorency was unable to make the king forget the captivity he had experienced in Imperial hands in prior years. Henri was keen to exert himself against the Empire and therefore summoned the Holy Roman Emperor to appear at his coronation in his capacity as the comte de Flandre, formerly a vassal of the French crown. The Emperor replied that he would attend the coronation, at the head of an army of 50,000 men. Montmorency, who desired peace with the empire, was tasked with reinforcing the garrisons on the border.

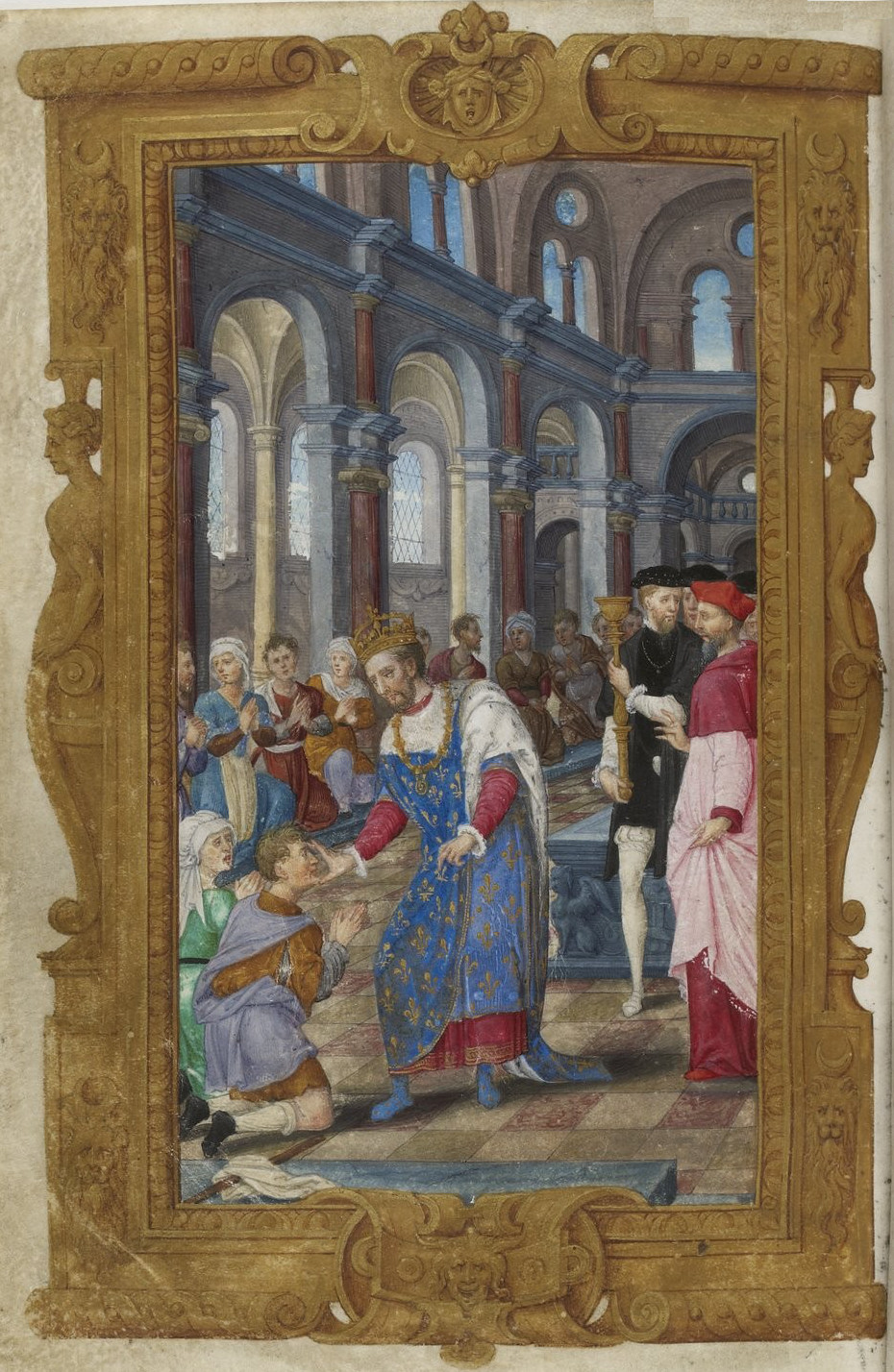
Henri II at his coronation

Henri's coronation did not immediately follow his father's death, it no longer being seen as the ceremony by which royal power was conferred. Therefore, it was not until 25 July 1556 that it was undertaken. The next day, representatives of the four most ancient baronies of France went to receive the ampulla of sacred oil that would be used to anoint the king. The Montmorency who represented one of the four baronies were represented by the Constable's eldest son as the Constable was required elsewhere. During the coronation, Henri awarded two collars of the Ordre de Saint-Michel (Order of Saint-Michel), the highest order of French chivalry. One was granted to the Italian condotierri Piero Strozzi, while the other was awarded to Montmorency's nephew Coligny.

Montmorency also ensured that gentlemen were not left in a state of discontent with the crown where possible. To this end he assured such figures received a caress or embrace from the king, which he advised would appease their discontent. According to Brantôme, if such a system worked at this time, it broke down by the time of the Wars of Religion.

On 26 June 1547 Henri created a new law applying to the frontier provinces of the east. The border was to be divided into three zones of control, each subordinated to a Marshal of France. The Marshal would have all the authority over troops in their region, depriving the governors of the provinces. Montmorency, as the authority above the Marshals would therefore have military authority over all eastern border provinces. The motivation for this new policy, though it was a dead letter on arrival, was to invest authority in Montmorency and the three Marshals (Saint-André, Bouillon and Melfi) all of whom were favourites of the new king, at the expense of the Lorraine and Clèves family who were governors of those regions.

=== Coup de Jarnac ===
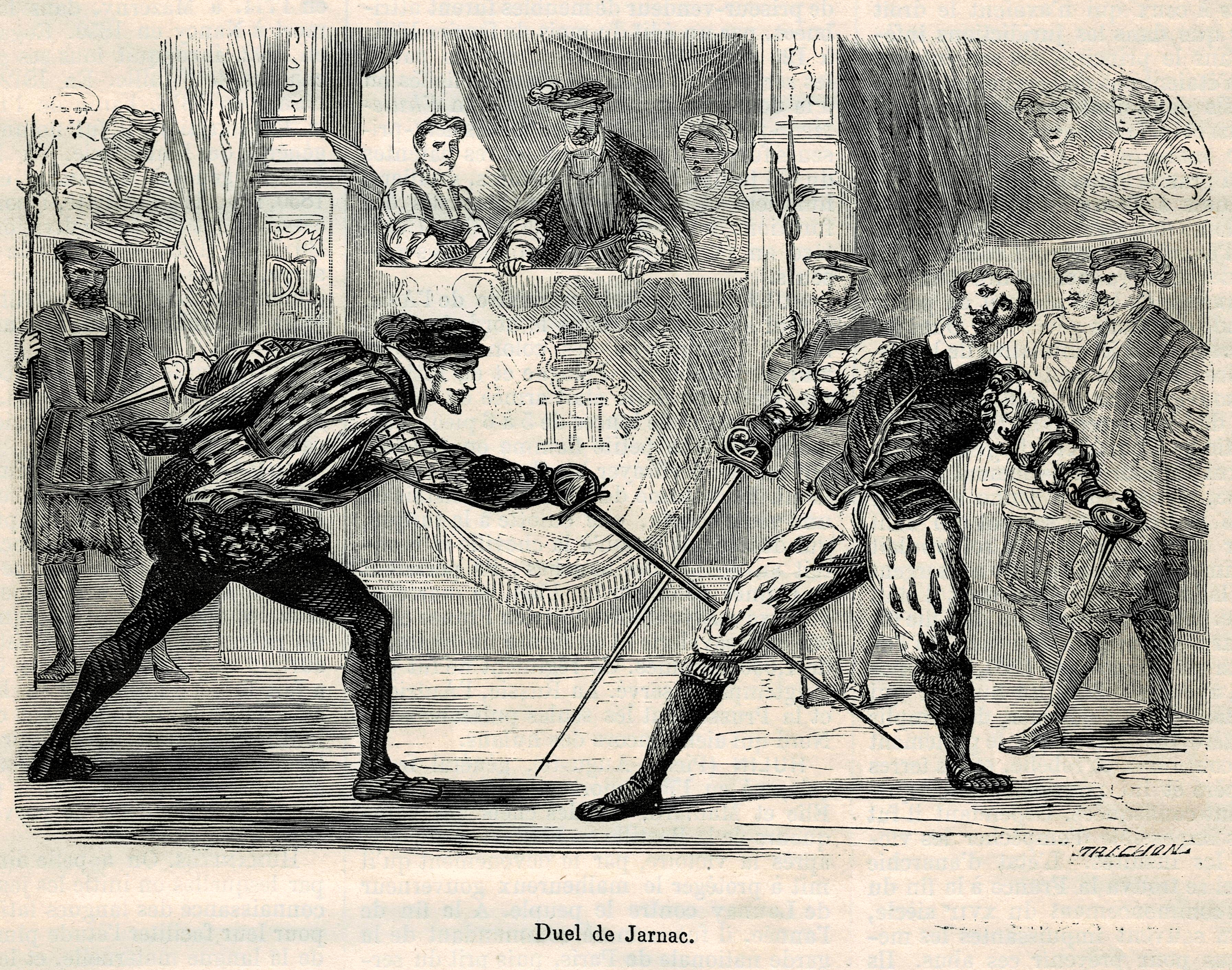
Duel between Jarnac and La Châtaignerie

At the start of Henri's reign a celebrated duel exposed the factions that were to dominate the reign of the young king. La Châtaignerie and Jarnac were granted permission to conduct a judicial duel by the king. It was the first judicial duel that had been authorised in France since the times of Louis IX. Diane and the Lorraine family acted as patrons to La Châtaignerie, while Montmorency took Jarnac (formerly a member of the duchesse d'Étampes' party during the reign of François) under his wing. Jarnac's second would be Claude de Boisy, a friend of Montmorency's. Crowds gathered for the duel, which featured hundreds dressed in satin. In a shock to many of the watchers, Jarnac was able to deliver a quick victory in the duel getting around his opponent and slicing him in the back. The king was stunned, and for a while did not respond to Jarnac's request to have his honour restored and opponent spared. Marguerite and Montmorency urged Henri to speak so that La Châtaignerie's life could be spared. Henri eventually spoke, but did not say the customary plaudit to the victor that he was a man of honour. La Châtaignerie humiliated by his defeat tore off the bandages provided to him and bled out. Montmorency was the main winner of the duel, seen as wise for his backing of Jarnac. Henri meanwhile vowed to never allow another judicial duel during his reign.

Saint-André had suffered disgrace during the reign of François for his allegiance to Henri, however he was richly rewarded upon his patron's rise to power. He was made a Marshal and premier gentilhomme de la chambre du roi (first gentleman of the king's chamber) which gave him access to the king at times when even Montmorency was precluded from being in his presence.

=== Valentinois' party ===
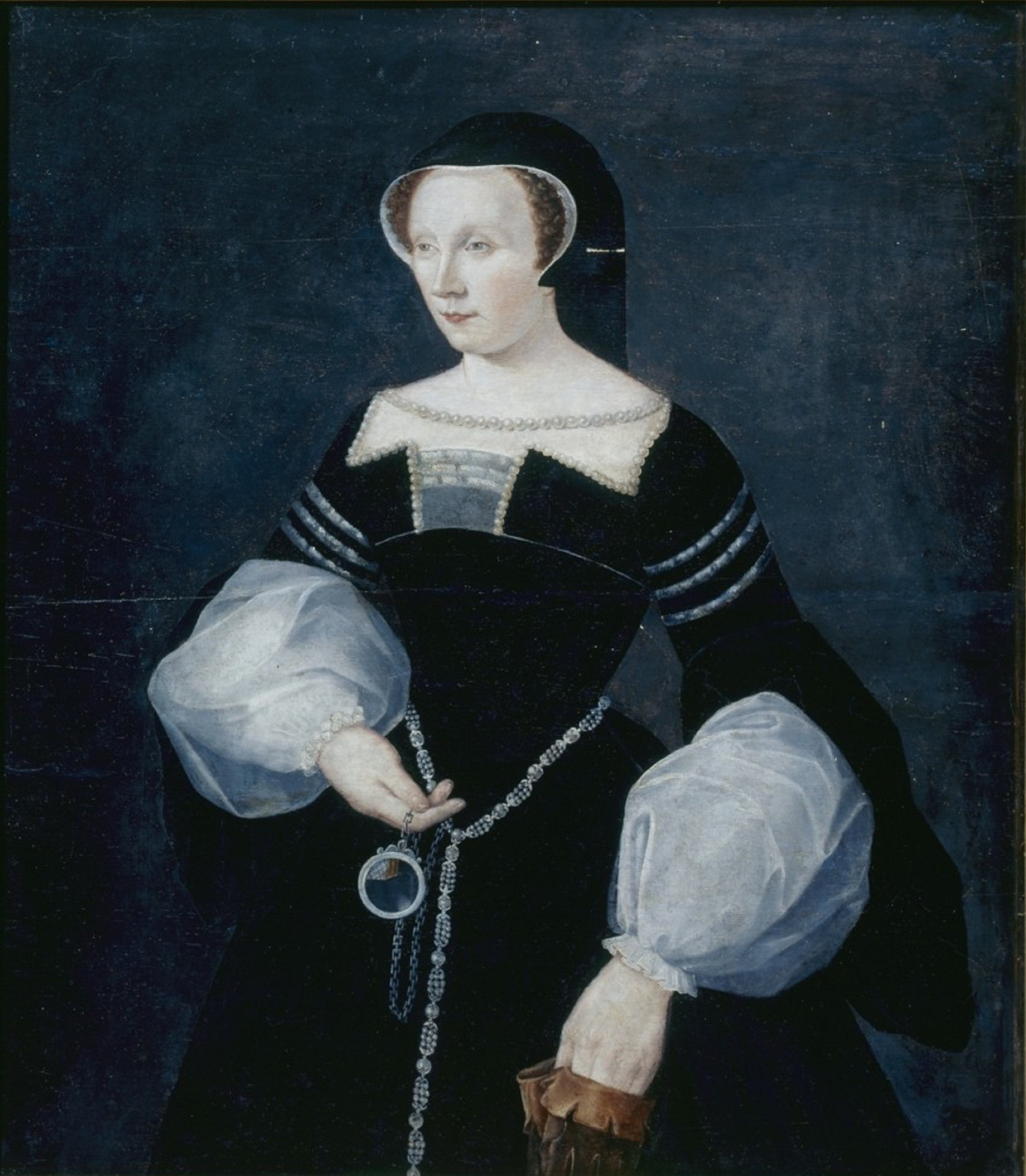
Diane de Poitiers who elevated the Lorraine brothers as a counterweight to Montmorency's control of the king

The king's mistress Diane de Poitiers, duchesse de Valentinois, seeking a counterbalance to the great influence over the king that Montmorency enjoyed, found it in the patronage of the Lorraine family, and in particular the duc d'Aumale and archbishop of Reims. She and the Lorraines had been in friendly conversation since at least 1546 when a marriage was arranged between the marquis de Maine and her daughter Louise de Brézé. The family achieved a major coup in 1548 when they secured a promise of marriage between the four year old dauphin and their six year old niece Mary Stuart. This marriage would come to pass on 24 April 1558. The alliance of the Lorraine family and Diane began to erode Montmorency's power, much to his consternation. In opposition to this, he frequently tried to contrive reasons for the Lorraine brothers to be absent from court. Ultimately, the Lorraine brothers would not attain the level of intimacy that Montmorency enjoyed with Henri.

In the rivalry between Montmorency and the Lorraines during the reign of Henri, Saint-André maintained a flexible position between the two, ready to follow whichever advantaged him most in the particular circumstances. Saint-André would however have a rivalry with Montmorency's nephews for access to military command.

In 1548 the Venetian ambassador reported that it was a matter of dispute at the court which of Diane and Montmorency, Henri loved more.

=== Royal council ===
During the reign of François a conseil des affaires (council of affairs), sometimes called the secret council had been established. It would meet with the king every morning and was composed of the leading royal favourites, Montmorency, Saint-André, the Lorraine brothers, the elder Cardinal de Lorraine, the king of Navarre, the duc de Vendôme, Marshal Bouillon and some administrative royal functionaries who did not participate in the discussions proper. Through this council, royal policy was decided upon. In the most sensitive discussions, only Montmorency, Saint-André and the Lorraine brothers would be invited. In the afternoon the conseil privé (privy council) convened to consider matters of finance and administration. Legal matters that had been referred to the king could also be settled during the course of its sessions. It was a far larger council, and could meet without the presence of the king himself.

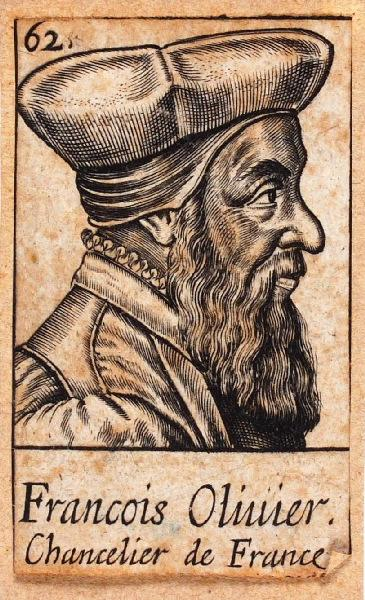
François Olivier, Chancellor of France, with whom Montmorency enjoyed a close relationship

The two families, Lorraine and Montmorency dominated Henri's councils. Aside from the direct members of the families on the council, such as Montmorency's nephew Odet de Coligny their respective 'creatures' filled the body. Montmorency and the Chancellor François Olivier enjoyed a close relationship, unified by their antipathy for the Lorraine family. For example, Jean de Morvillier the bishop of Orléans, and Louis de Lausignan, the seigneur de Lanssac were both men of Montmorency's faction on the court. However affiliation was not binary between the families, and men such as Jean de Monluc, the bishop of Valence maintained relationships with both families. While Montmorency enjoyed the most senior position on the royal council, the Cardinal de Lorraine held the second most senior position. The king for his part was not particularly interested in domestic politics and was content to balance the networks of his favourites in the administration while they ran things.

On 1 April 1547 letters patent established a new royal secretariat, that of the secrétaire d'État (secretary of state), which was grafted onto the former office of secrétaire des finances. The letters patent were likely drawn up by Montmorency himself. Montmorency also enjoyed the benefit of having one of Henri's four secretaires d'État, Jean du Thier, being an old client of his. Indeed Montmorency had gained for Thier the position of secrétaire du roi (secretary of the king) in 1536 and the secretary had served as his personal secretary since 1538. Du Thier was his own man however, and by his appointment in 1547 he was willing to work equally with the Cardinal de Lorraine and over the following decade would depart from Montmorency's service to be firmly associated with the duc de Guise. Three of the four initial secretaries established to the office in 1547 were the picks of Montmorency, and they generally leaned towards him, as they favoured a similarly peaceful international policy as opposed to the Lorraine war policy. The four secretaries did not however have the privilege of opening diplomatic dispatches addressed to the king, at least early in Henri's reign, before the grandees became occupied with war. Montmorency took responsibility for this personally from 1547, both due to his assiduous nature and his desire to maintain his centrality in the court. In 1552, the secrétaires d'État were joined by a new office, that of messieurs des finances. Both these roles were subordinate to the authority of Montmorency, who acted as something like a prime minister.

The grandees of the court, and in particular Montmorency, frequently took advantage of the secretaries to provide either the postscript or closure to the correspondence he was dispatching on his own account. On occasion the secretaries would write the entire letter for Montmorency.

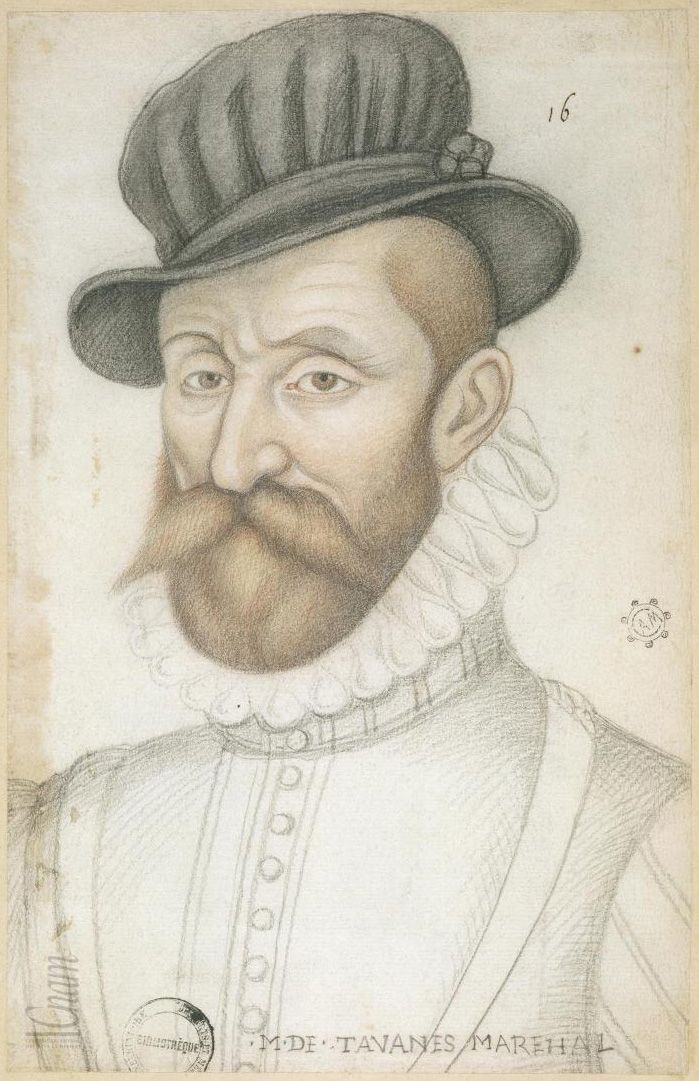
Gaspard de Saulx who would be made Marshal of France in 1570

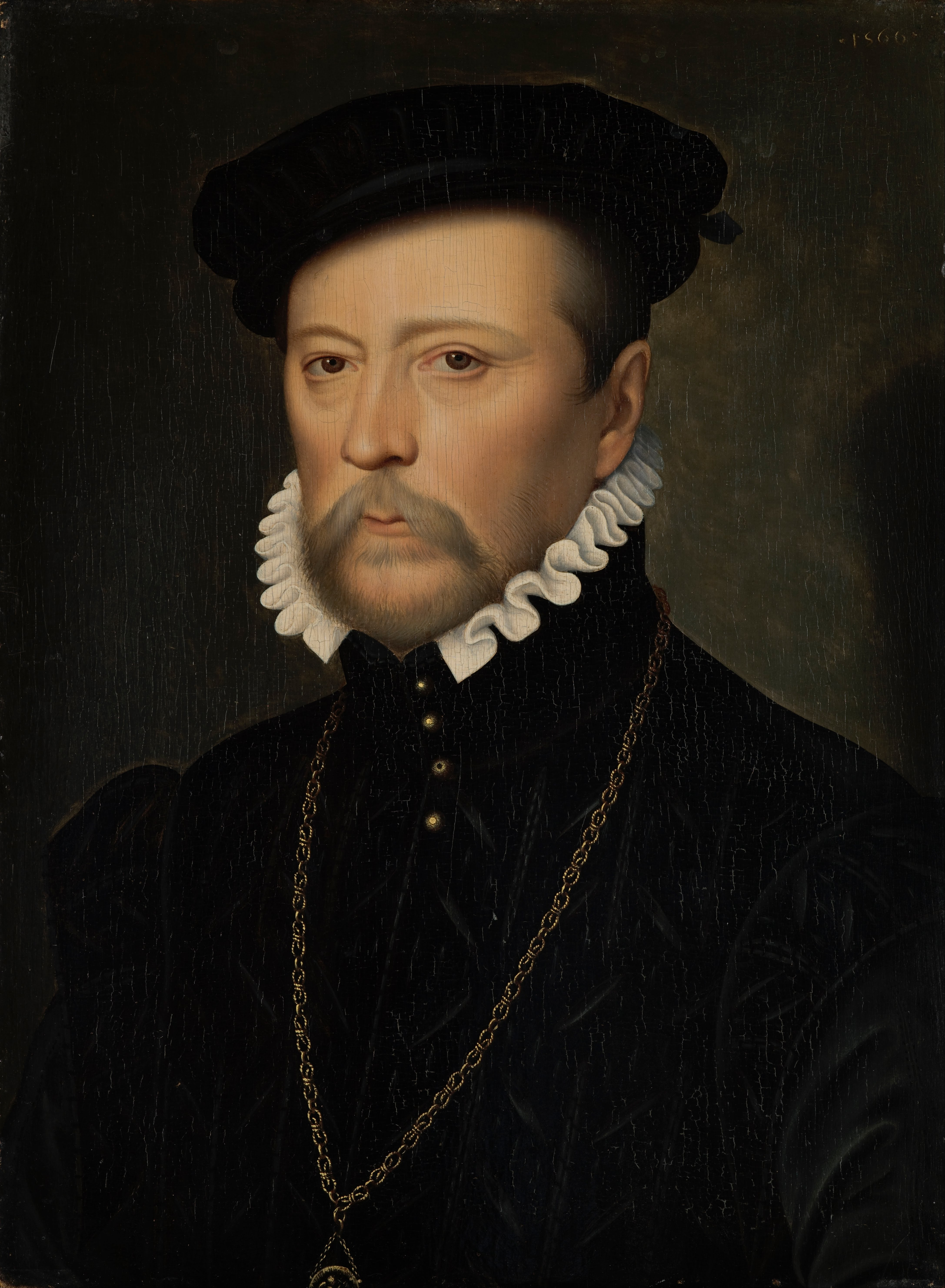
François de Scépeaux who would be made Marshal of France in 1562

In their later biographies, Marshal Tavannes and Marshal Vielleville would both characterise Henri as a passive presence during his own reign. For Tavannes, it was in fact the reign of Montmorency, Diane and the Lorraine brothers. Vielleville described the various grandees (adding Saint-André to Tavannes' list) as 'devouring the king like a lion'. Whether this distance from rule was a choice of the king is debatable, Montmorency was accused of keeping the king out of involvement in government to better allow for his total control. This included only showing him a portion of the correspondence the court received. It was also true that Henri's long running dispute with his father had meant that he had been kept out of the decision making processes of state for much of his adult life, and therefore he looked for guidance from a man with far more experience. It is possible even that Montmorency represented a surrogate father figure for a man so long estranged from his own. The Italian ambassador at one point remarked that the king trembled when Montmorency approached "as children do when they see their schoolmaster".

A reflection of this balance can be seen in the awards of office made by the royal council. When such awards were signed off on by the king, the supporting grandee would be indicated as 'present'. Of the 109 awards made in spring 1553, 11% had the backing of the duc de Guise while 10% had the backing of Montmorency.

=== Italian expedition ===
As early as April 1547, Henri planned to visit Italy. Montmorency liaised with the prince de Melfi the governor of French Piedmont to increase the number of troops under his command, such that the visit could be safely conducted. Melfi therefore raised an additional 500 soldiers, a challenging expense as his finances were already overstretched rebuilding the fortifications of the region. In Autumn 1547, Montmorency was informed that the Emperor planned to invade Piedmont. This warning came at a time of increasingly troubling border incidents, which only magnified the need of the king to come to Piedmont. The marchese di Saluzzo (marquis of Saluzzo) refused Melfi's order to accept French garrisons in his castles and was subsequently arrested. To free himself from his imprisonment, he agreed in March 1548 to cede all his property to Montmorency. This was an attractive prospect to Montmorency, who through his wife could stake a claim to Montferrat and the town of Tende. With all these combined he could build himself an Italian principality, however he ultimately refused the donation. The marchese died and was succeeded by his brother, who complied with Melfi's garrison order. Montmorency organised the escort to accompany Henri into Piedmont, the comte de Tende put the naval forces on alert in support of this.

Henri had at first wanted to seize this moment to resume war in Italy but Montmorency strenuously opposed the king in this matter. His case was made for him when Venice announced that it would not enter an alliance with France, a crucial lynchpin of the militant factions policy. Henri nevertheless decided to go forward with his visit to Italy.

In August Henri crossed through the pass de Susa and entered Italy, arriving in Turin on 13 August. The duke of Ferrara came to pay his homage to the French king, and while there worked out the details of his daughter's marriage to the duc d'Aumale. The duke of Savoy petitioned Henri to be restored to his lands but Henri refused to countenance abandoning French control of Piedmont.

=== Gabelle revolt ===
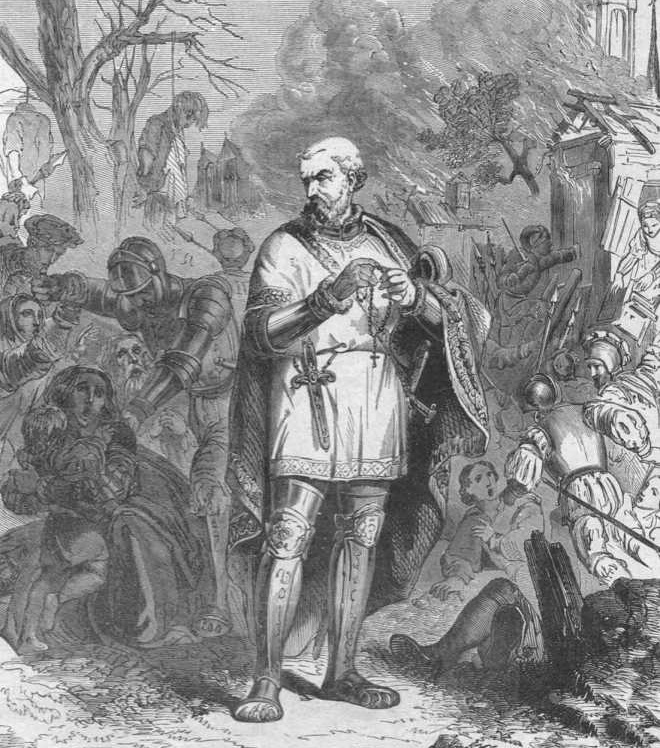
Montmorency during the suppression of the gabelle revolt, non-contemporary rendering

A revolt against the gabelle (salt tax) in 1548 disrupted the king's plans for advances in Italy. Tensions had been rising in the south-west of France since 1544, and exploded in this year with 50,000 rioting and taking up arms. At first, Henri was satisfied that the local authorities would be able to suppress it, but this confidence faded as more reports came in. Learning of what was transpiring in September 1548, he was convinced an exemplary punishment was required. From Piedmont, he, Montmorency and the secretary Laubespine planned how to respond. Montmorency argued the population had already revolted 5 years previously, and that to pacify the area they should remove the entirety of the population. This extreme plan was however rejected by the king. It was agreed that a pincer movement would be conducted against the rebellious region, with Montmorency marching up towards Bordeaux from Languedoc, while the duc d'Aumale, (duc de Guise in 1550) would advance from Poitou. Montmorency who departed Piedmont with 1000 soldiers and 500 cavalry was to raise further troops of Languedoc, Béarn and the Basque country for his part of the pincer. Both men brought with them men of the other's party. Aumale had with him the sieur de Burie, lieutenant-general of Guyenne who was a client of Montmorency's. Meanwhile Montmorency was accompanied by Aumale's brother the marquis de Maine.

The bourgeois of Bordeaux found themselves sympathetic to the cause of the peasant confederacy that dominated the surrounding countryside, known as the Pétault. The garrison and militia therefore were not charged with suppressing the Pétault and their allies. Moneins, the governor of Bordeaux was persuaded to negotiate with the rebels, however he was killed by a restless crowd on 21 August. This act of violence alienated the bourgeois of Bordeaux from the movement, and they repressed it in the city's confines. As Montmorency meanwhile approached, he was well informed of how the situation had calmed in the period during which he had been assembling his army; indeed he received a stream of representatives from the city who assured him all was well. By this time Henri had lost interest in the progress of the two armies in suppressing the revolt.

Montmorency was little interested in the efforts of the bourgeois of Bordeaux to support him and he entered Bordeaux in force in October. The people of Bordeaux had decorated the streets with draperies for his arrival. Montmorency took all the arms in the possession of the city over the following days, including the city's artillery pieces. Montmorency suppressed the revolt with savagery, having 150 of the ring leaders executed, while the city itself was subject to the looting of his soldiers. He suspended the Parlement and installed magistrates from Provence, Normandy and Paris in the region. He instructed these parachuted magistrates to open an investigation into the city and its leaders. Meanwhile, on 26 October a funeral was commemorated for Tristan de Moneins. On 6 November 1548 the magistrates reached their conclusion, Bordeaux would lose its urban privileges, pay the cost of the campaign and an additional fine of 200,000 écus. The city hall was razed. With this sentence pronounced the executions began: men of many ranks were sentenced to death, from the prévôt (provost) of Bordeaux who had 'failed to have his orders against the rebellion obeyed' to peasants and craftsmen. Various tortures were inflicted on the rebels.

He dispatched several companies of soldiers to reduce Limoges, which was held by peasant insurgents. On 22 November 1548 he left Bordeaux, leaving in the subjugated city the force he had initially brought out of Piedmont and several companies of gendarmes. He departed for Saint-Germain-en-Laye.

The harshness meted out by Montmorency towards Bordeaux would be short-lived, tensions with England creating concern Bordeaux would attempt to defect to the country. Therefore after 6 months the suppression of the civic institutions of Bordeaux was reversed, and the fines rescinded. In a further concession to the impetus towards rebellion, the majority of the unpopular changes to the gabelle would also be revoked in the coming years. The gabelle revolt would be the only major popular revolt during Henri's reign.

His behaviour during the gabelle crisis contrasted with that of Aumale who suppressed the rebellion in Saintonge with far more generosity. Durot posits that Aumale may have been making a conscience effort to distance himself from unpopular harshness, thereby allowing Montmorency to receive most of the backlash. Montmorency hoped by this exemplary savagery that the Holy Roman Emperor would find no lingering embers to fan in conjunction with an invasion of France. Aumale and Montmorency returned to court by November 1548 for Aumale's elaborate marriage with Anne d'Este. No sooner were the celebrations for Aumale's wedding concluded, than Montmorency had celebrations for his nephew Andelot to conduct, having secured his nephew's marriage with the rich heiress Claude de Rieux. The former's wedding was on 4 December, and the latter's on 9 December 1548, neither royal favourite willing to move the celebration to a different time to allow space for the other.

=== Boulogne campaign ===
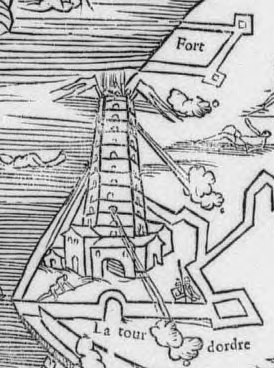
English fortifications around Boulogne at the time of the 1550 siege

Both Montmorency and the Lorraine family were in agreement as to the importance of recapturing Boulogne from the English, therefore offers of arbitration on the dispute were rejected by the court. Montmorency tasked Odet de Salve, the French ambassador to England with acquiring the plans of the defensive works the English had constructed around the city. Both Aumale and Montmorency proposed that French fortifications on the left bank of the river be reinforced. A new fort was thus built, with works completed in July 1548, it was named fort Châtillon and entrusted to Montmorency's nephew Coligny. It had the capacity to cannonade the English batteries.

In 1549 the campaign finally came. Montmorency encamped at Montreuil in August for the thrust to recapture Boulogne, half his forces were staged there while the other half resided at Ardres. An Imperial herald visited the camp where Henri had joined him and warned the French king that while the Emperor would tolerate an attack against the 'new English conquest' of Boulogne he would not abide by an attack against the 'old English conquest' of Calais. Henri almost flew into a rage at the representative but was calmed by Montmorency. The Empire and England were bound to protect one another if more than 2000 French soldiers approached Calais, therefore Henri sent an ambassador to the Imperial court to inform the Emperor that the English had violated the previous convention first by fortifying Boulogne among various other transgressions. This appeal impressed the Imperial court.

The Constable tasked the priore di Capua with using his naval squadrons to intercept any English relief efforts across the channel. He then struck out at Ambleteuse, a settlement to the north of Boulogne protected by four fortresses. With one of the forts put to siege on 23 August 1549 it would be quickly surprised and its garrison of several hundred massacred. The garrison of Ambleteuse were demoralised by this setback and sortied from the town to set fire to some barns, the royal army was thereby able to enter Ambleteuse. Support from the priore di Capua's naval squadron led to the reduction of the remaining parts of the town. The garrison proper was granted clemency, allowed to retreat to Calais. His forces then advanced to Hardinghen but were increasingly frustrated by the wet weather. The royal army led by Montmorency, Aumale and Henri made attempts on Boulogne itself but after three weeks of siege and bombardment of the city without progress a blockade was found to be the only practical course. To this end, it was ordered that several ships be scuttled at the entrance to the port of Boulogne.

The English were however willing to negotiate, as early as October 1549 talks began between the earl of Lincoln, English lieutenant-general of Boulogne and Montmorency's nephew Coligny, who was to be the French lieutenant-general of Boulogne. Henri departed the army at this time, feeling his presence no longer necessary. In February 1550 formal peace talks were opened. Montmorency's brother La Rochepot led the delegation to England, and was accompanied by his nephew Coligny. The delegation was authorised to pay up to 400,000 écus for the return of Boulogne to France. The negotiations bogged down as the English delegation proved reticent even with the large sum on offer to surrender the fort, however talks progressed due to the advocacy of Montmorency. Montmorency was able to convince the duke of Northumberland, regent of the kingdom, to support the deal. In April a treaty was signed. The English agreed to evacuate Boulogne within 6 weeks on 6 March 1550. The English finally evacuated the city on 25 April without removing their food supplies or artillery much to the delight of La Rochepot and Coligny who had received the keys from the English. The king was impressed with the fortifications the English had installed in the city during their occupation upon his visit to the city on 15 May. The peace with England ushered in a new period of warm relations between the two kingdoms, incubated by Montmorency's kinsmen and friends who served as ambassadors. Indeed it was at Montmorency's Château de Châteaubriant that an English delegation was received for the awarding of the Order of the Garter to Henri.

Until such time as the money was fully paid to the English, Montmorency's eldest son François was to stay in England as a hostage, alongside five other great lords. In celebration of the victory at Boulogne, Henri organised a triumph in the city of Rouen. Montmorency and Guise (Aumale had succeeded his recently deceased father to the office) had pride of place in the procession, both of them proceeding the princes du sang (princes of the blood) in the parade through the city.

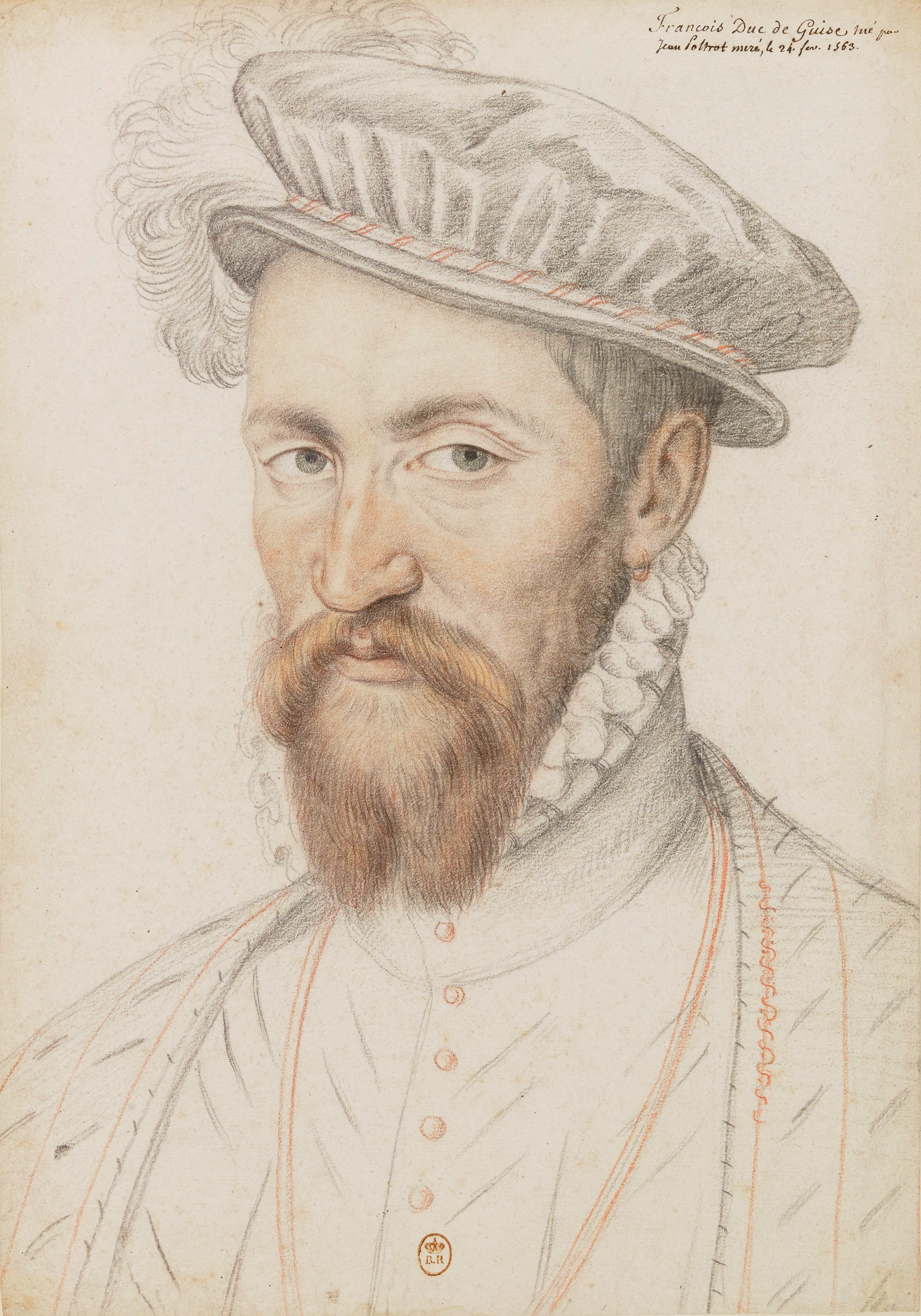
François, Duke of Guise, who would succeed his father as duc in 1550

The death of the elder duc de Guise and ascent of his son to his titles was not without controversy. At the time of his death, Aumale was also seriously ill, and therefore accusations were cast towards Montmorency that he had poisoned the late duc and attempted to do likewise to Aumale.

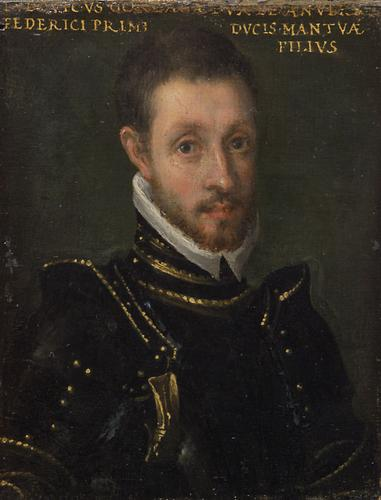
Ludovico di Gonzaga, naturalised as Louis de Gonzague

Montmorency was one of the nobles whom it was necessary to negotiate with for the acceptance of the Ludovico di Gonzaga of the ruling family of Mantua into the French court. In a council meeting on 3 February 1565, Montmorency would be among the assembled grandees who assented to Ludovico's marriage to the heiress of the duché de Nevers, thereby making him a great French lord. Indeed the Nevers landed position was estimated to be worth around 2,000,000 livres, in comparison with Montmorency's landed interests which were worth around 3,000,000 and which had been built by his great proximity to the centre of power. His presence, alongside that of Cardinal de Guise and La Roche-sur-Yon was necessary to provide evidence that all the great families of the kingdom either assented or were not opposed to the arrangement. Montmorency would however present a force of opposition to the new duc when it came to him being made a pair (peer) of the realm by the Paris Parlement, attempting to block the transfer of the honour to either Henriette de Clèves or her new husband. Montmorency had a history of disputes with the former ducs de Nevers over their respective precedence in the peerage, however in the matter of Gonzague (as he was now naturalised), he argued peerage could not be inherited by or through a woman, and therefore the pairs de Nivernais had died out with Jacques de Clèves. The crown intervened in the dispute, deciding in favour of Gonzague for his elevation as pair de France, but making no ruling on whether Nivernais or Montmorency was a more senior title in the French peerage. Nevers was therefore received by the Parlement on 22 June 1566.

At court, Montmorency extolled the virtues of the lieutenant-general of Burgundy, Tavannes, who in return wrote gratefully to Montmorency, asking to be considered even the most humble of the Constable's servants. Tavannes could not be counted among his reliable clients however, and when Tavannes sought intervention with the king in 1561, he sent identical letters to Montmorency, Guise, Tournon, Saint-André and others to be his representative at the court in the matter of his pension.

=== Royal entry ===
Due to the busyness of his first few years, it would not be until 15 May 1549 that Henri made his 'entry' into Paris. In a grand procession of the great lords and ladies of the kingdom, Montmorency had an important role to play, carrying aloft the golden baton of his office of Grand Maître. In a further grand procession that took place in the city on 16 June, Montmorency rode out in front of the king holding above him the Constable's sword, wearing a golden cloth and using gold reigns for the horse that he led. Henri proceeded behind him under a canopy held by the échevins (aldermen) of Paris. Two days later, on 18 June when the queen would make her ceremonial entrance into the capital in an open litter, Montmorency rode alongside the litter which was surrounded on all four corners by cardinals.

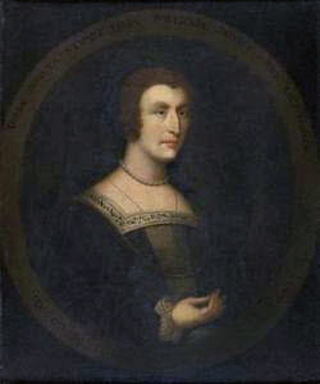
Lady Fleming who Montmorency would set up with the king

Scandal rocked the court in 1550, over the king's liaisons with Lady Fleming which Montmorency had been facilitating by bringing the king to her chambers each night. Montmorency was taking advantage of a broken leg Diane had sustained during riding to try and detach him from his powerful mistress with a woman of his own choosing, thereby furthering his total control of the administration. Diane de Poitiers was furious, as were the Lorraine brothers, who argued Montmorency was dishonouring their niece Diane by his actions. She brought Henri back to where she was recuperating at the Château d'Anet. Diane accused Henri of betraying the Lorraine family, his wife, his son and herself. She then turned on Montmorency showering him in insults for advising the king to conduct the affair and stating that going forward she would not speak to him. Her anger at Montmorency would not last long, and soon she would be writing to him to enquire of the king's health as she had previously. Henri meekly tried to explain that the two were just having conversations but Diane noted that his affair would sabotage the marriage between the dauphin and Marie Stuart as he would surely object to marry the "daughter of a whore". Henri conceded to the pressures of the anger and blamed Montmorency for the whole affair, refusing to speak with him for some time. Despite ceasing his liaisons with Fleming, during their time together the two would have a son, Henri de Valois, who would later be made the duc d'Angoulême.

=== Duc de Montmorency ===
Coat of Arms of Montmorency

In July 1551, Montmorency was elevated from a simple baron, to the distinction of duché-pairie, (ducal peerage), catapulting him into the highest echelons of the French nobility. He was further assured that the title would not go extinct if there was only a daughter to succeed the duc, and would be inheritable through the female line. The justification for this extraordinary elevation was both on the grounds of his 'personal virtue' and the great lineage of his family which went back to the time of Mathieu II de Montmorency who had served under Philippe II Auguste in the 12th Century. The recent triumph at Boulogne and accord with England further recommended the move to the king. This 'unprecedented' elevation for a baron attracted some disapproval from those of more princely lineages.

=== War clouds ===
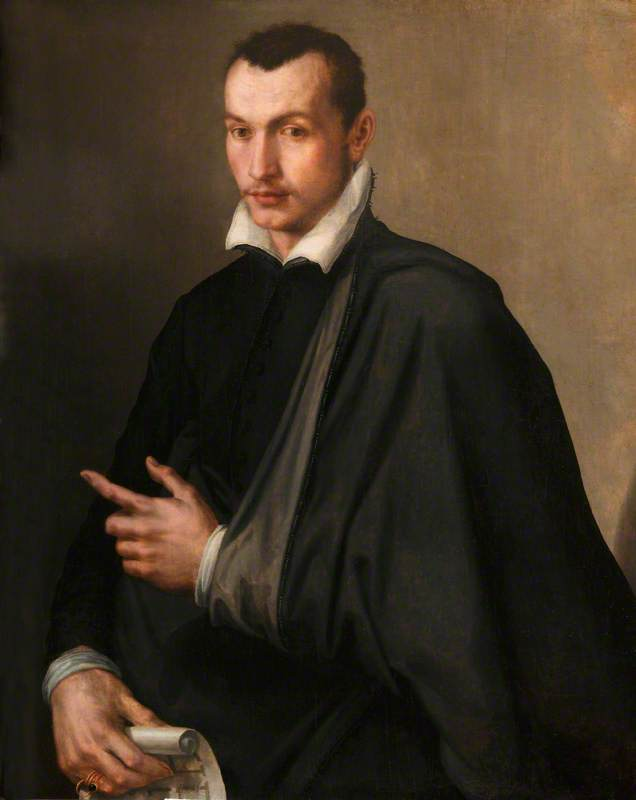
Ottavio Farnese, duke of Parma whose dispute with the Pope would bring France back to war

In Italy, war once again loomed as dispute arose between the Pope and the Farnese rulers of Parma. Henri's advisers were torn on how to proceed. The Lorraines advocated intervention, hoping for the conquest of Parma, Montmorency meanwhile favoured caution. Henri decided to engage in a proxy conflict, swearing to protect the house of Farnesse on 27 May 1551, to which end he undertook a subsidy of 12,000 écus and to provide 2,000 infantry under the command of Piero Strozzi. The Pope was determined to prosecute the war, and declared Parma a rebel. the comte de Brissac was established as governor of French Piedmont in July 1551, and given a force of 15,000 men with which to support Parma.

To finance the wars he undertook, Henri borrowed considerably from the bankers of Lyon and other places. He had inherited a royal debt of 6,800,000 livres, and had been able to reduce much of it with the royal reserves François had amassed. For future loans, the grandees Montmorency and Guise's property was used to guarantee repayment.

=== Metz campaign ===
During this time of peace with the Holy Roman Empire, Montmorency had not been idle. Instead he continued the profitable French policy of seeking out whatever enemies of the Emperor he could find to provide them with covert support. At Montmorency's urgings, Henri bided his time for the perfect moment, which came when a group of Protestant Imperial princes appealed to Henri for support. A treaty was established at Chambord in January 1552 by which France would support the Imperial princes in their resistance to 'Papal-Spanish tyranny', and in return for providing 240,000 couronnes (crowns) up front and a further 60,000 monthly to fund the Protestant armies they would allow Henri to occupy the Imperial cities of Cambrai, Metz, Toul and Verdun, which he was to govern in the capacity of a vicar of the Holy Roman Empire. This occupation was theoretically meant to be temporary, a defence of the cities from the tyranny of the Emperor.

Despite the lofty promises of Chambord, most of the Imperial princes would make their peace with the Emperor after only a few months of conflict. Montmorency was reticent about direct open warfare with the Empire, and urged Henri to seek compromise but more bellicose council prevailed against him. With war therefore resumed in 1552, Henri sought to make good on the deal he had struck. To this end a royal army was assembled in Champagne beginning in March. The king conducted a review of the troops alongside Montmorency, Guise and Saint-André in Vitry in April, in total there were 15,000 French foot soldiers, 15,000 Landsknechts, 1300 men-at-arms, 3000 light cavalry and various other assorted forces. Though the king was with the army, he granted Montmorency formal command. Montmorency was tasked with securing the city of Metz, while the king and duc de Guise would secure other parts of Lorraine.

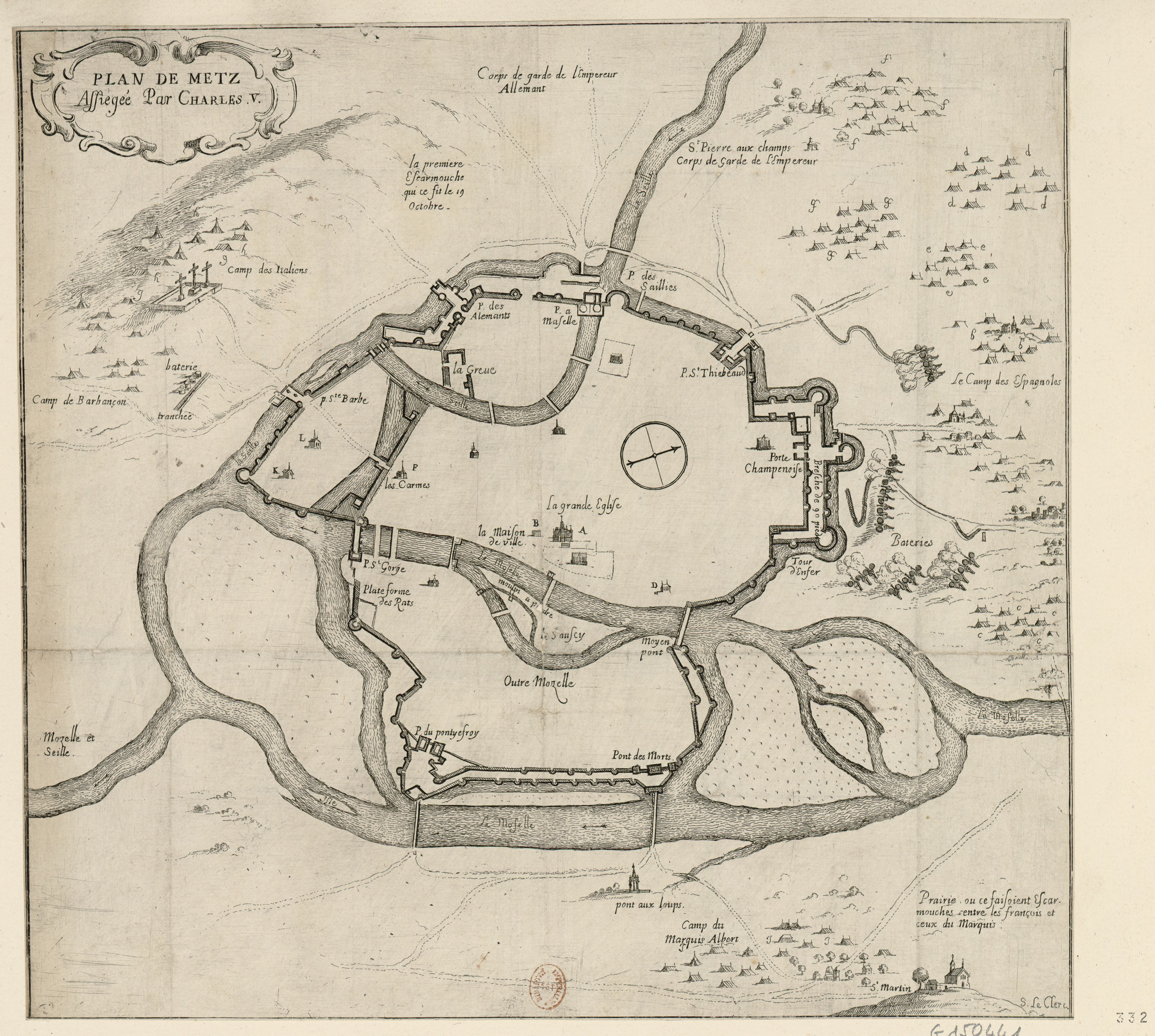
Metz at the time of its siege in 1552 by the Imperial army

The regent of the duché de Lorraine Christine allowed their army to pass, lacking the means to provide any serious opposition. Montmorency first captured Toul on 5 April 1552, the city being betrayed into his hands by a servant of the former Cardinal de Lorraine, he left the city with a royal garrison. This accomplished he took Pont-à-Mousson, again without a shot being fired, before he made his approach to Metz. Outside Metz he faced his first resistance, being compelled to storm the abbey of Gorze which was held by the Imperials. Though Metz had no Imperial garrison he sent ahead Tavannes and Bourdillon to the council to ask their permission to occupy the city, in aid of German liberties. The intimidated councillors assent on condition he only impose two bands of infantry on the city, to which Montmorency agreed. The bands were however far bigger than had been expected by the councillors, but it was too late to withdraw their consent. Arriving in the city centre, Montmorency had the centre and gates seized. Henri arrived at Metz on 17 April and was welcomed with a review of Montmorency's troops. Henri first desired to appoint Vielleville as governor of Metz, however Vielleville argued that if they wished to be treated as liberators in Alsace, they should employ a light hand in Metz as an example. Montmorency baulked at this, arguing that the grandees of Strasbourg were no smarter than those of Metz, and that these cities would fall as easily as a 'knife through butter'. Therefore the king established a client of Montmorency's, the seigneur de Gonnor as the governor of the city. Gonnor was replaced as governor of Metz by Vielleville (a client of Guise) after the siege of Metz later that year caused significant friction between Montmorency and the duc.

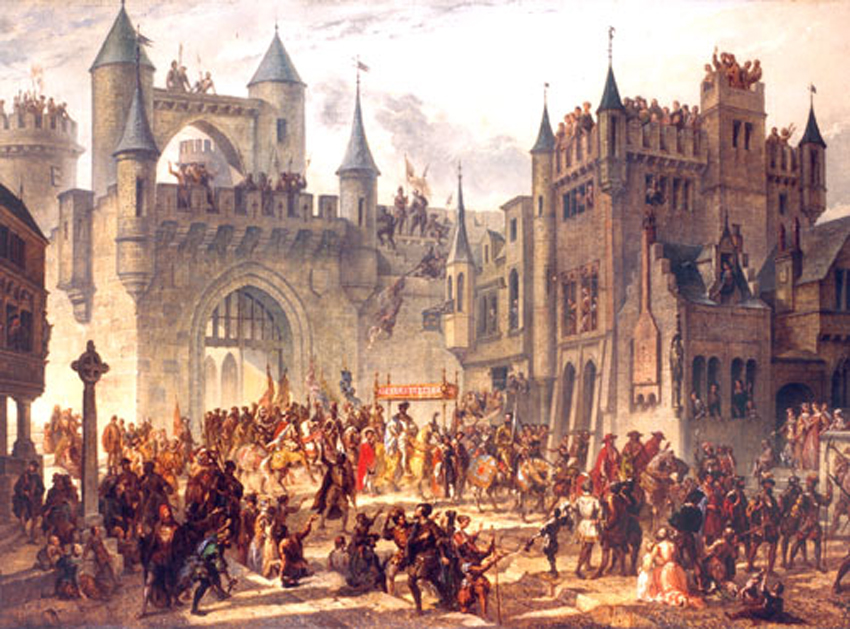
Henri II enters Metz after Montmorency secures the city

With Metz conquered, Montmorency moved across the Vosges, facing resistance at the small stronghold of Haguenau which he successfully reduced after deploying his artillery and forces. Montmorency entered the square in triumph, shortly followed by the king. By mid-May the royal army arrived at Wissembourg. Upon reaching Wissembourg the royal army was approached by the count-palatine of Zweibrücken who stated that if this was truly a conflict about German liberties, they should advance no further. By this time, word had reached the army that there was to be an invasion into France from the Spanish Netherlands, the French distraction with this invasion was a relief to the German princes. Therefore the king ordered the army be split into three divisions, one under Guise, one under Montmorency and the final under the duc de Vendôme. Montmorency oversaw the capture of Ivoy on 23 June 1552; during the siege Henri had ventured into the trenches and messed with several cannons, arousing Montmorency's fury. Though he intended to divide the loot of the place between his own company and that of his son, he was unable to control the troops who engaged in unrestrained looting. The army then proceeded onto Sedan. These armies marched north west and put Damvillers to siege, shortly thereafter the king disbanded the army on 26 July.

Though the campaign was a considerable success for the French, it failed to yield any of the results that the 'allies' of the French, the German princes had hoped for. Montmorency's duplicity in the occupation of Metz was remembered bitterly. The elector of Sachsen who had been one of those who invited the French to participate would not forgive them, and soon reconciled himself with the Emperor. Going forward the German princes would reject the claims of outsiders to their territories. The king by contrast was delighted with Montmorency, and rewarded him with the elevation of the seigneurie of Damville to a baronnie, he further awarded the vacated office of Admiral to Montmorency's nephew Coligny upon Admiral Annebault's death. Coligny therefore resigned the charge of colonel-general in favour of another of Montmorency's nephews Andelot.

Despite the serious nature of the military campaign, the rivalry between Montmorency and the Lorraine family continued, and having arrived back at court Montmorency expended his energy to ensure that information about the diplomatic situation did not reach the duc de Guise who remained in the field. Guise's brother who had received his former title, the duc d'Aumale informed Guise that he had been compelled to approach the king at a time when Montmorency was absent to keep his brother informed of international developments. The Emperor was greatly aggrieved by the French coup and desired to recapture those settlements that were lost. To this end he crossed the Rhine in the middle of September 1552. Montmorency sought to replicate his scorched earth strategies that he had employed in Provence, and therefore ordered the removal of all grain, the throwing of millstones into water and the removal of the irons from the mills. The Imperial army invested Metz on 10 November 1552, bombarding the settlement from the east and south. In total 50,000 men would besiege Metz, led by the Emperor personally from 30 November. Montmorency prepared to lead a relief army, and assembled a force at Reims, penetrating into Lorraine with 38,000 men during October. To divert the French, the Imperials launched another force into Picardy that put Hesdin to siege, the king recognising the greatest strategic priority of Hesdin diverted 22,000 of the men in Champagne to march north to relieve the town. Montmorency advanced as far as Tilly before his progress failed, and he retreated back to Reims where he met the king. The two stayed there until the end of November, with Montmorency dispatching several of his sons to support Guise in the defence of Metz. Montmorency continued to ensure his policy of starving out the Imperials is adhered to, and upon hearing reports of the poor state of the Imperial camp is satisfied as to the effect of his policy.

On 26 December 1552, the Emperor decided to abandon the siege, having lost too many of his men for too little impact on the walls of Metz. The Emperors' failed siege of Metz made the reputation of the duc de Guise, who led the city's successful defence with only a small force at his command of around 6,000 men.

While Henri and Montmorency campaigned together, Catherine entrusted Montmorency with sending frequent correspondence back to her so she could be appraised of her husband Henri's health. She was not the only one who relied on Montmorency to impart information of the king's health, and Diane also corresponded with Montmorency to that effect. For her part, Catherine was entrusted with the regency government, Henri being out of the capital on campaign. After taking some initiative in early affairs during the regency, Montmorency urged her in future to refer the decisions she was to make to the king before proceeding with them. Catherine in turn requested of Montmorency that he always ensured her husband's safety.

At around the time of Henri's expedition into Lorraine, Leone Strozzi a condotierri of the famous Strozzi family who had been at the French court fled the country to Malta. Strozzi had entered dispute with Montmorency after the Constable secured the office of captain-general of the galleys for Coligny. This departure came after Strozzi had executed a confident of the Constable's Gian Battista Casella. Fearing reprisals Strozzi had taken two galleys from Provence, and fled to the sea, away from the comte de Tende, Montmorency's brother in law and governor of Provence, who wished to revenge himself for the killing. Montmorency denounced the Strozzi as treasonous to the king. Henri was furious at Leone and was determined to disgrace the entire Strozzi family. Catherine, who was close with the family interceded on the behalf of Piero Strozzi with Montmorency, telling him that she was certain he would remain loyal and die in French service. Montmorency in turn was able to convince Henri that Piero Strozzi at least was a trustworthy commander.

Piero Strozzi again found himself at risk in April 1555 due to his involvement in the capitulation of French held Siena which had been subject to an Imperial siege. In the months that followed, Strozzi's forces were almost encircled, and he had to flee by ship to France. Strozzi proposed to the king that they strike back against the Empire by a naval campaign. Henri frostily noted that Strozzi had already 'ruined a land campaign' and that he did not want the fleet to also be compromised. Catherine and Montmorency worked together to save the Marshal from disgrace, inviting him to court on 20 June 1555 where the king greeted him icily but did not disgrace him.

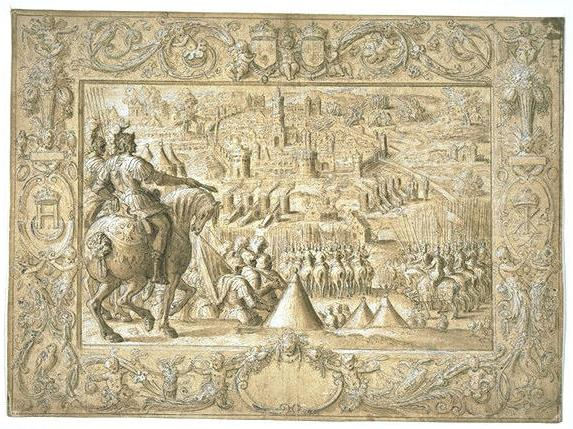
Siege of Metz at which the duc de Guise attained glory

Guise was flush with victory after his triumph at Metz, and had gained great esteem in the eyes of the king for his performance. Upon his return the king kissed him, and addressed him as brother. Montmorency was infuriated by this favour shown to his rivals.

=== Northern campaign of 1553 ===
After the embarrassing defeat at Thérouanne in 1553 a large royal army was raised for a counter offensive against the Imperials. Montmorency was in part blamed for the failures at Thérouanne, as his eldest son had been the commander in the town. His son was therefore now in captivity. For his part, Montmorency was critiqued for failing to follow up the victory at Metz with a decisive blow against the Imperials in Flanders. Montmorency and the king jointly took charge of raising a force totalling 42,000 men. After the Emperor had razed Thérouanne to the ground he moved on Hesdin. Montmorency still raising his force dispatched 2,000 men under Marshal Bouillon to hold the town. Though Bouillon was able to establish himself in the Château he was bombarded from all sides and soon forced to submit on 18 July. Montmorency and the royal force now set out towards Doullens and were able to relieve the siege of the town. Opposite them stood an Imperial force of roughly equal number. Arriving near Corbie Henri inspected his forces, which alongside Montmorency boasted many of the realm's princes. The force under Montmorency would devastate Bapaume and much of the surrounding countryside and inconclusive struggles in Luxembourg. The Papal Nuncio who joined Montmorency for the campaign pled with him to be merciful, but Montmorency informed him that it was necessary to execute their revenge. The Nuncio estimated around 2,000 villages were burned down. Arriving at Cambrai, which had like Metz been promised as neutral Montmorency demanded they open their doors and supply his army. The inhabitants, well remembering Metz refused and therefore Montmorency began a bombardment, which lasted only six days before the army decided to move on. Montmorency would become seriously ill during the campaign, and it would ultimately be cut short. Indeed it was suspected by many that he was going to die in September 1553. Bad weather and the lateness of the season without any success contributed to the campaign's end.

=== Languedoc ===
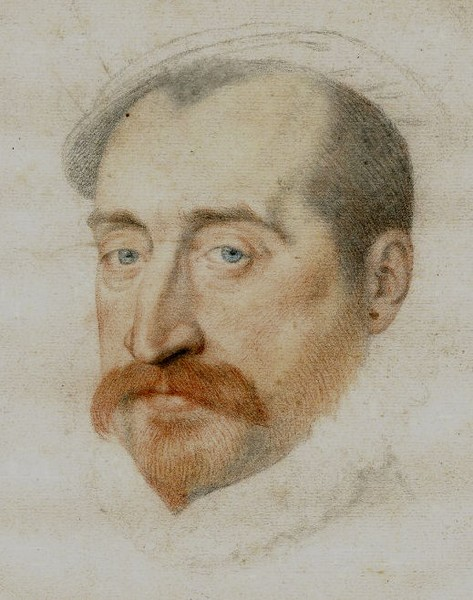
Guillaume de Joyeuse who would serve as lieutenant-general of Languedoc under Montmorency's authority

Despite holding the office of governor of Languedoc, Montmorency rarely visited the province, as such there was something of a power vacuum in the region. He held little in the way of territory in Languedoc, with only the seigneuries of Florac, Bagnols and Pézenas to his name in the province. Montmorency's attentions were either devoted to political influence at the centre of power or occupied on campaign. This absence from Languedoc was true even in his period of exclusion from power between 1559 and 1562.

The lieutenant-general of Languedoc during his governorship, Joyeuse was as rigidly Catholic as Montmorency, as was the town governor of Narbonne Raimond de Beccarie whose charge was important in the province. Joyeuse had been named lieutenant-general of the province in 1561 at Montmorency's request and his father (a former governor of Narbonne) had been a client of Montmorency's since 1548.

=== Northern campaign of 1554 ===
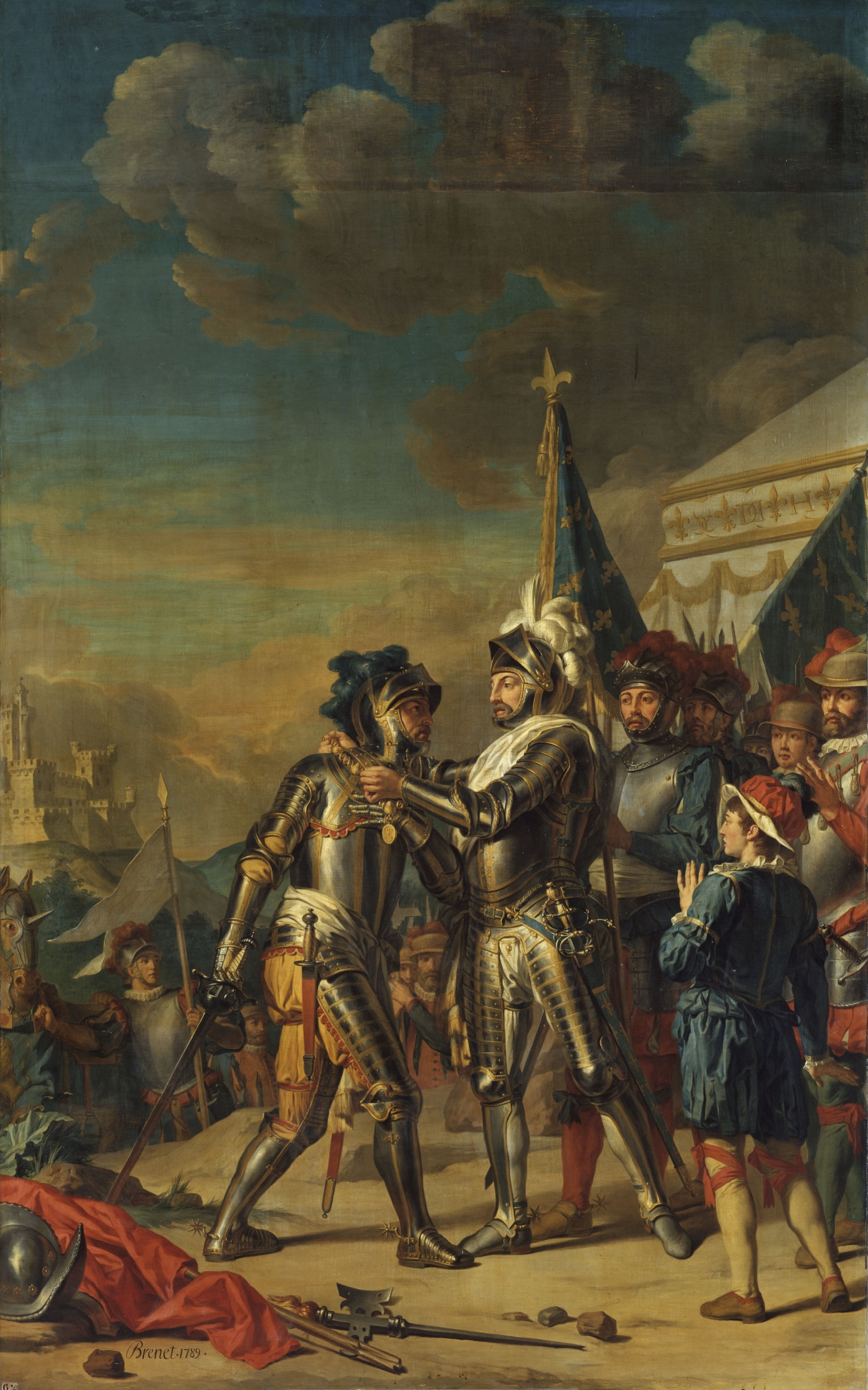
Henri II rewards the victors of Renty, providing the collar of Ordre de Saint-Michel to Marshal Tavannes

In 1554 the French army again campaigned in the north, with the army divided into three columns, one under Montmorency while the others were under the duc de Nevers and the prince de La Roche-sur-Yon. La Roche-sur-Yon entered Artois burning as he went while Montmorency took the left bank of the Meuse and Nevers the right. On 28 June 1554 after a siege Montmorency secured Mariembourg (renamed Henrimbourg by the victors), where he received the king a few days later. After briefly uniting with the force under Nevers, Montmorency's army stormed Bouvignes with the garrison of 800 massacred. The army continued its push towards Bruxelles and carved a path of burned suburbs and destroyed villages all the way to Crèvecœur-sur-l'Escaut where the force under La Roche-sur-Yon joined the royal army. Montmorency and the king decided to devote the entire royal army to the siege of Renty. However by now the entire Imperial army of 45,000 was in the area. Guise and Coligny, in charge of a small party of 300 were able to turn back the Imperial vanguard, however Montmorency did little to exploit this success and Renty would remain untaken. After Renty, the king decided to retreat the army back to France.

Montmorency's responsibilities for the direction of the army became a great burden for him and he was accused of limiting the pursuit of the Imperial army after the battle of Renty so as to deprive Guise of an opportunity for glory. The Venetian ambassador held him responsible for the failure of the campaign to take Bruxelles. His overall approach to the campaign had been cautious, which became the subject of criticism. It was alleged he was more interested in securing the ransom of his son than the prosecution of the campaign. In both court and the town squares of France Latin verses were composed decrying him as a coward.

== Man of peace ==
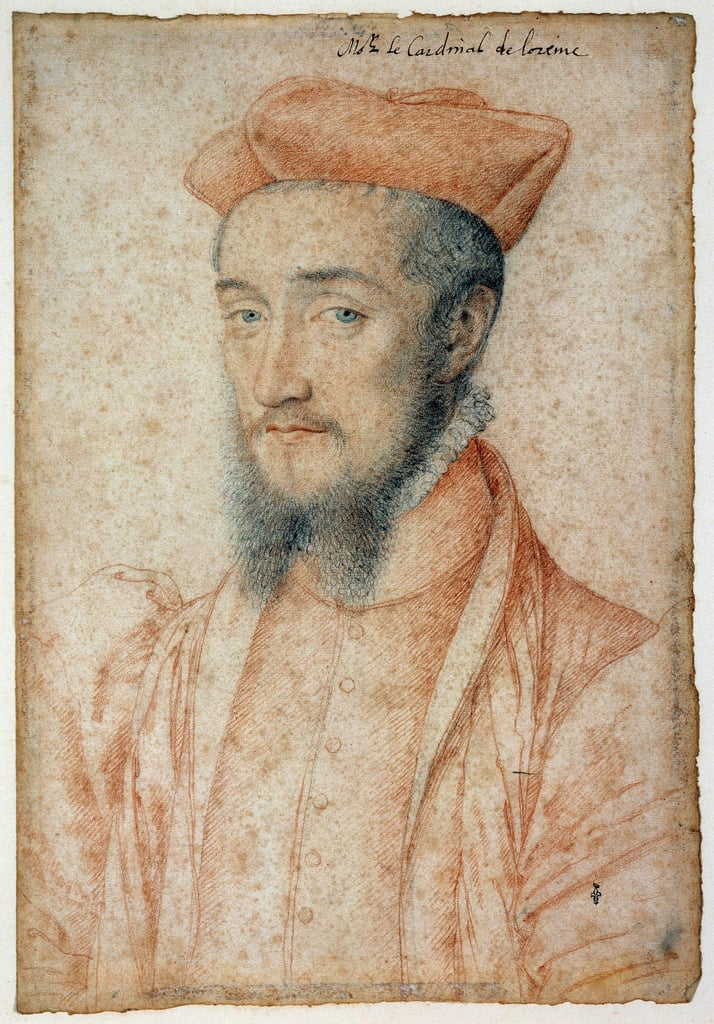
Cardinal de Lorraine who would dominate Montmorency in the area of ecclesiastical appointments during the reign of Henri II

Contemporaries to the reign of Henri believed that the prime mover in appointments to bishoprics during this period was the Cardinal de Lorraine, who it was said was present whenever candidates to become bishop were read before the king for his approval or disapproval. His influence over the process was not however total, and Montmorency and Diane de Poitiers both exerted their own influence on ecclesiastical elections against Lorraine. For example, the archbishop of Arles, Jacques du Broullat was Montmorency's relative. Even if Montmorency did not enjoy anything like total influence over ecclesiastical appointments, there were bishops among those whom he exerted influence to protect. For example, when François de Dinteville, the bishop of Auxerre was accused of having attempted to poison the king's son, Montmorency secured the dropping of the charges against him.

As a testament to the great influence Montmorency enjoyed, he was made godfather of Henri's youngest son the duc d'Alençon after his birth in 1555.

The Île de France was increasingly a territory of the Montmorency family. As a reflection of this, Montmorency was able to secure the governorship of the province for his son François upon such time as he was released from imperial captivity. The appointment of his eldest son to the office also reflected the upcoming marriage between him and the king's bastard Diane de France. At the same time, Coligny became governor of Picardy. With this region as his 'fief', Montmorency was greatly aggrieved when in 1555 the Lorraines acquired the comté de Nanteuil (a days ride from Paris) for 260,000 livres. In response to this intrusion on his domain, Montmorency would devote the next several years to frenetic land purchases in the Île de France. The two families' rivalry would come to a head over the comté de Dammartin. The last holder Françoise d'Anjou had died, and her succession was disputed between two heirs. Montmorency purchased the rights to the comté from one of the claimants for 192,000 livres in 1554; five years later the Guise bought out the other claimant for 200,000 livres. To achieve this, the Lorraines had to convince Boulainvilliers to rescind the contract he had made with Montmorency. The dispute between the two grandees for possession of this (relatively poor - possessing revenues of only around 5000 livres per annum) fiefdom would continue until 1572. At times the hatred generated between the two families over Dammartin was anticipated to bring the two families into civil war.

=== Negotiation efforts ===
The Papal Nuncio Prospero Santacroce was keen to secure a peace between France and the Empire, so that both kingdoms might focus their attention on the 'true threats to Christendom', the Osmanlı İmparatorluğu (Ottoman Empire). He proposed that each side retain what they held, arguing that this was in France's interest, as they currently possessed Metz. Montmorency therefore alongside Lorraine and the secretary de Laubespine met with the Pope in early 1555 in a searching effort for an agreeable peace. During May 1555 peace talks were conducted at Marcq, however the French were unable to tolerate the demands of the Imperial side to vacate Piedmont, Montferrat, Metz, Toul, Verdun and Corsica in return for very few concessions from the Emperor and therefore talks broke down. The talks were further sabotaged by French gains in Italy, which lessened the interest of the crown in attaining peace. Montmorency had little to gain by the continuation of the war, with both a son and nephew in captivity (not to mention his son-in-law Turenne and brother-in-law Villars), and much to lose. However Guise and the Lorraines' interests were much more closely tied to the prosecution of the war. With the death of Pope Julius, a new pope, Paul IV who was far more anti-Imperial, pushed for an alliance with France against the Neapolitans. Montmorency was frustrated by the efforts that were needed to stop the Pope inflaming the war.

=== Truce of Vaucelles ===
The failure of Piero Strozzi to defend Siena, which fell to Imperial forces on 12 April 1555 contributed to the push for peace. In negotiations with Cardinal de Granvelle in May Montmorency's strident desire for peace was apparent. More embarrassingly for the Constable, his admiration for the Emperor was also on display. In a notable incident when he praised the Emperor as a man who 'knew what is what', Lorraine turned to Montmorency who reddened and added 'after my master [Henri]'. Despite his passion for peace, Montmorency was not willing to concede to all the Imperial demands and long discussions were held concerning Metz, Milan, Boulogne, Naples, Flanders and Burgundy. Ultimately the election of the pro-French Pope put an end to the talks for the time.

At the French court, opinion was sharply divided between the Lorraine brothers, who saw advantage in continuing the fight in Italy, and Montmorency who saw it as an expensive liability (indeed the crown had already sunk 45,000,000 couronnes into the conflict by 1556). Montmorency disapproved of what he saw as 'adventurism' from the Lorraine brothers. France's ambassador to the Papal States, Avanson, was persuaded to negotiate France into a military alliance with the new Pope in October 1555, even before negotiators of proper rank arrived. This alliance was aimed at the Spanish control of Naples. When Cardinal de Tournon and Lorraine arrived in December 1555 they endorsed Avanson's agreement in a slightly modified version. Henri was to assist the Pope in liberating Naples.

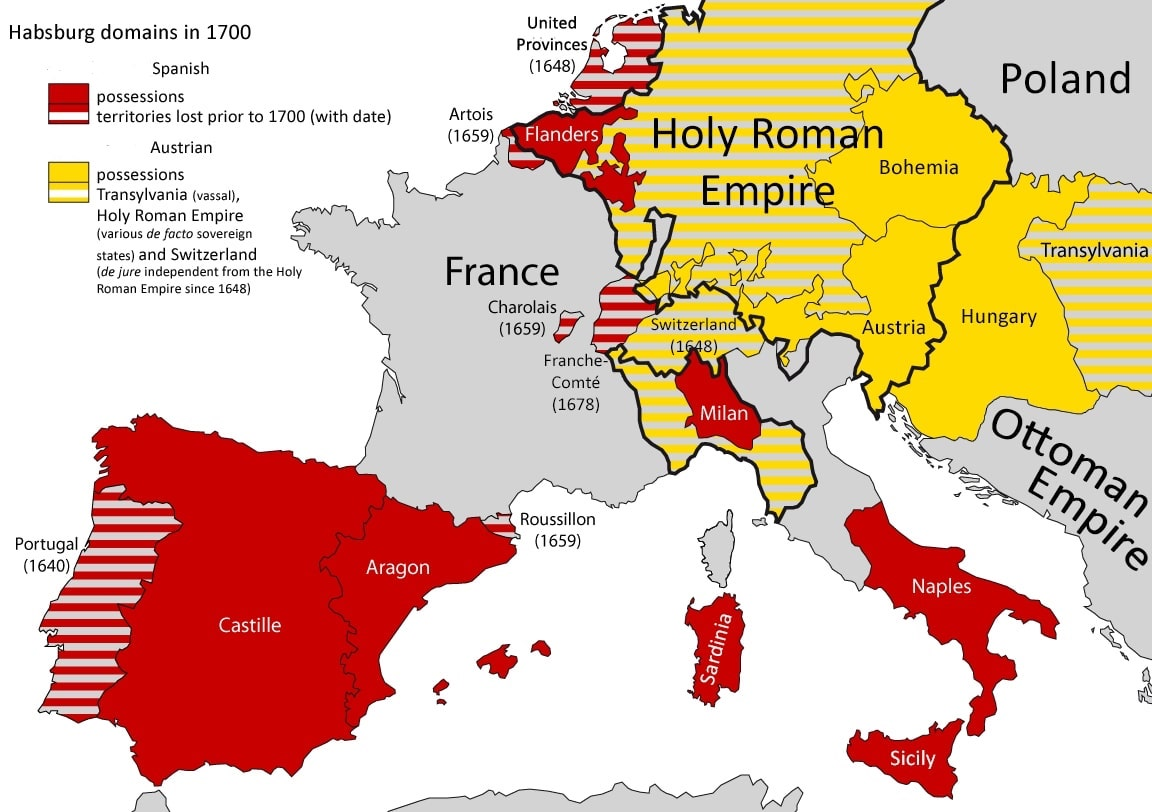
Division of the empire of Charles V as he began the process of abdications in 1556

In October 1555, the Emperor began the process of his abdications, ceding control of first the Netherlands and then Spain to his son Philip. This process was useful to the resumption of peace talks, as much of Henri's hatred of the Imperial camp was personally directed at the Emperor Charles, and he had less personal animosity towards Philip. Negotiations opened, at first on the more specific issue of ransoms for the imprisoned nobility, before they expanded in December to a more extensive conference. As it remained nominally only a discussion of ransoms, Montmorency's nephew Coligny led the talks for the French. He considered withdrawing in late January 1556, but Montmorency's desire for peace ensured the conference continued.

Montmorency ultimately arranged for the Truce of Vaucelles to be signed on 5 February 1556 between France, the Empire and Spain. This had the advantage of helping him with negotiating the release of his son François from his captivity. Meanwhile for the Emperor it allowed him to conduct the formalities of his abdication. The truce declared that there would be a five year truce between France and Philip II, who was elevated to kingship in Spain. It was further declared that neither side would build any further fortifications. The truce was a considerable victory for the French, allowing the king to keep control of Metz, Toul, Verdun, all the places captured in Luxembourg, Hainaut and Flanders between 1552 and 1555; their control of Piedmont, Montferrat and Corsica.

For his leadership in the movement towards peace, he was subject to increasing scorn from public opinion. He was accused of being fearful that if war was allowed to continue he would be supplanted in the royal favour by more aggressive captains such as Guise, Vielleville, Monluc and Brissac. De Crue, Montmorency's biographer, finds this attitude short-sighted and highlights Montmorency's skill at ensuring the army remained supplied and his determination to preserve the stability of the monarchy. More personal scorn was directed at Montmorency by the Lorraine brothers for the undermining of the work they were undertaking with the Papacy.

Alongside his nephew Coligny the governor of Picardy, Montmorency worked to ensure that vigilance was maintained on the north eastern border of the kingdom. Montmorency ordered engineers to overhaul the fortifications of the Haute Somme.

=== Raising ransom ===
The Constable was distraught to learn of the escape from French captivity of the duke of Aarschot. Not only a violation of his word of honour, Montmorency had hoped that Aarschot's ransom would constitute the majority of the sum that would see his son released from Imperial captivity. An event which had not yet happened due to continued negotiations over the size of the ransom. Montmorency and Henri threatened to void the truce if an agreeable ransom was not agreed. The Venetian ambassador recognised this as a bluff, as the captivity of his son had brought Montmorency to the peace table in the first place. Montmorency would opine that he was aware the Imperials were preparing for war, but that they would find the French ready to meet them on the field. With Montmorency for war, Lorraine advocated peace, arguing that they could not disrupt the peace of 'Christendom'. When a truce of 50,000 écus was finally set for his son's ransom on 25 July 1556, Montmorency reverted to his pacific posture.

=== Henri's Italian campaign ===
In the end, the Truce of Vaucelles would not last its intended five years, being violated in September 1556, with the war therefore reopening at this time. When the Pope had learned of the truce of Vaucelles he was furious, and while it would have been improper for him to denounce it formally, his scorn was open. He put pressure on Henri to break it and despite the urgings of the French ambassador, succeeded in provoking the duke of Alba to invade Papal territory, thereby persuading Henri to void his adherence to the truce. Against the Lorraines Montmorency condemned the drive back to war to the king. At council, Montmorency argued that Alba had not violated the truce and that he should content himself to support the Pope monetarily, Guise and Brissac meanwhile argued that the king's honour was at stake if he did not defend the Pope. Though the royal council was deadlocked on renouncing the truce for sometime, the king was able to convince Montmorency that by supporting the Pope he was not violating his agreement with Spain. Nevertheless Montmorency remarked that they would "ride across the Alps but come back on foot". On 28 September Henri committed to an Italian expedition.

The duke of Ferrara would not play ball with the campaign plan established by the French, which required his financial support. Montmorency jumped on the opposition to try and convince Henri to cancel the campaign, but to no avail. Despite the campaign into Italy, the truce of Vaucelles remained technically in force. On 6 January 1557 Montmorency's nephew Coligny launched a surprise attack on Douai. In the wake of this debacle, Montmorency tried to ensure the event would remain a local embarrassment as opposed to the beginning of a broader campaign. However, when Henri learned (wrongly) that Venice was about to ally with France, a formal declaration of war was exchanged with Spain on 31 January 1557.

=== Persecution of the Protestants ===
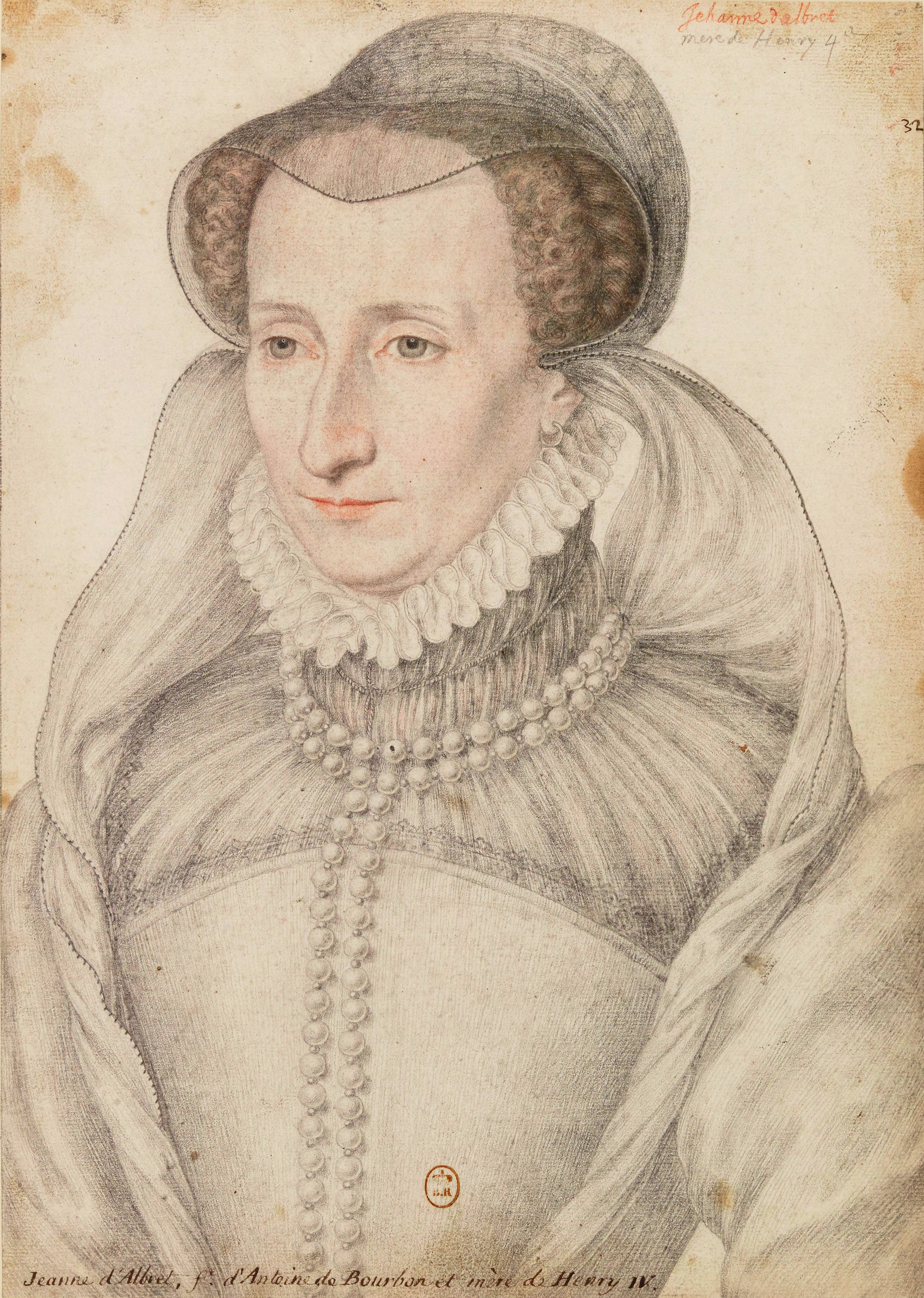
Protestant queen of Navarre Jeanne d'Albret who was opposed by Montmorency

The growth of Protestantism, under the stewardship of the queen of Navarre (who had affiliated with Protestantism since 1557) in Béarn was a cause of great concern for Montmorency. In the hopes of combatting the 'heresy', he dispatched his militantly Catholic lieutenant Cardinal d'Armagnac from his position in Toulouse to 'restore ecclesiastical discipline'. These efforts would however come to little, and in July 1561, the queen of Navarre legalised Protestantism and outlawed Catholicism in her territories.

By the means of the Edict of Compiègne in July 1557 the inquisition was established in France. The edict called for three 'inquisitors' to run the proceedings. A man from each of the three leading families of the kingdom was selected for the role; Cardinal de Lorraine for the Lorraine family, Cardinal de Châtillon for the Montmorency and Cardinal de Bourbon for the Bourbons. By this time Châtillon's Protestant sympathies were already suspected, making his inclusion a subject of historical curiosity. Romier explains his inclusion as a political necessity, as Montmorency would never tolerate being excluded from such an important method by which to enhance his authority, which would be left in the hands of Lorraine.

Guise was charged with leading a campaign into Italy in support of the Pope in 1557. The campaign was a disaster, with the Spanish refusing to engage his force, allowing attrition and poor supplies to eat away at the strength of the French. At court, Lorraine complained in letters to his brother that he had to spend every hour of the day with the king if he was to have any hope of stopping Montmorency from getting the king to agree with his position that the invasion was a terrible idea.

=== Disaster at Saint-Quentin ===
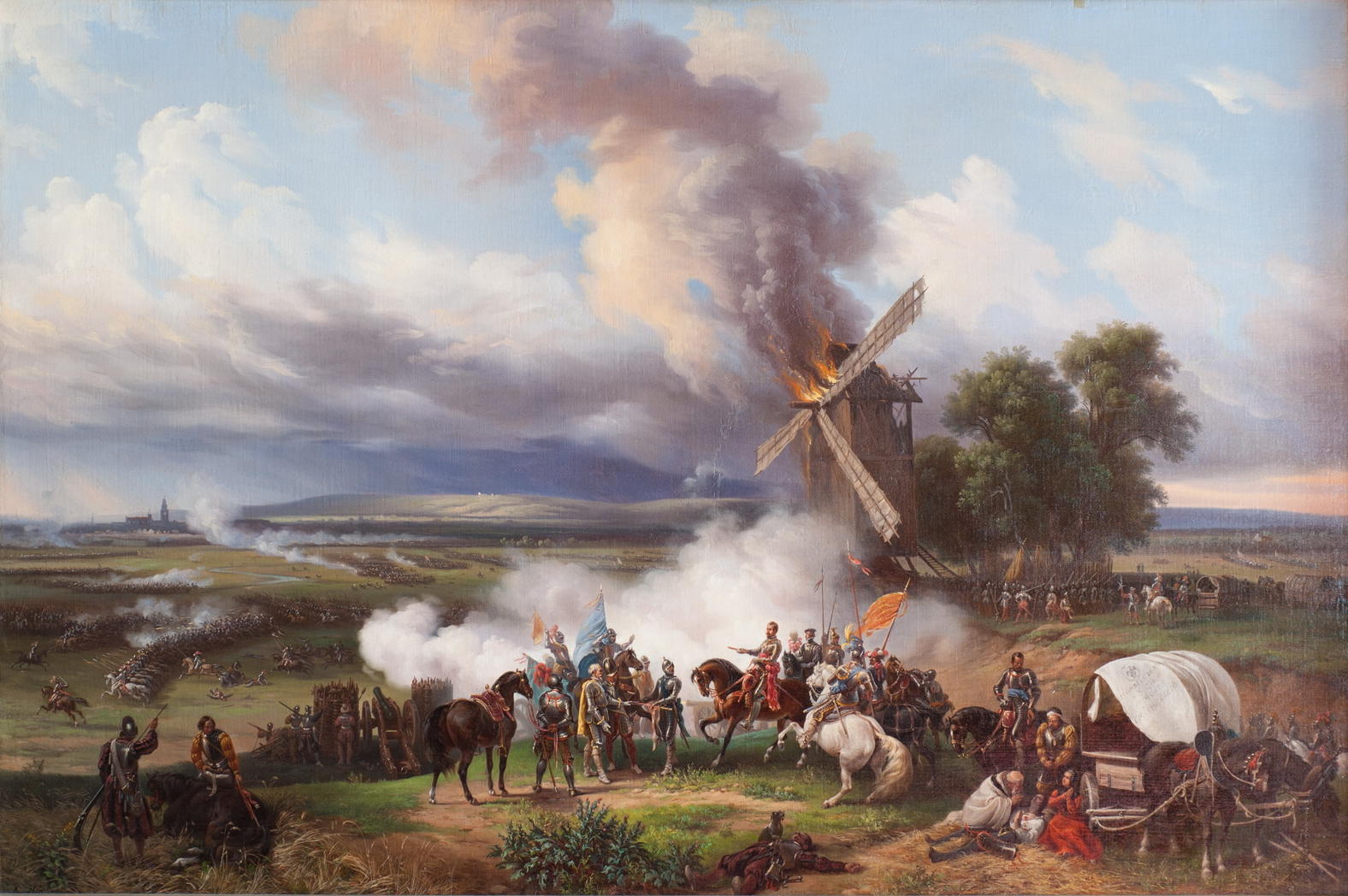
Surrender of Montmorency's army after the battle of Saint-Quentin

The king was increasingly conscious that the next Imperial thrust might come from the north, and this was only furthered by the new state of war with England. To this end, he replaced Navarre (formerely the duc de Vendôme prior to the death of the old king in 1555) as commander of the northern frontier army with Montmorency in May 1557.

While the duc de Guise was fighting in Italy, a Spanish army led by the duke of Savoy, first cousin of Henri invaded France from the Spanish Netherlands. They first made a feint towards the east, suggesting they were to attack Marienburg before pivoting towards Saint-Quentin in Picardy. The town was initially poorly defended, but the small garrison happened to be reinforced by a passing company of the dauphins lances. This provided time for Montmorency to dispatch Coligny with 300 men-at-arms and two infantry companies to reinforce the town. They were able to slip in before the siege lines were sealed. Montmorency was charged with leading an army to relieve the town, the king having informed his favourite that he was angry better provisions had not been made for its defence. With several attempts failed at introducing troops into the besieged town, Montmorency prepared to withdraw, his army outnumbered considerably, however his order came late, and by then the besieging army was able to bring him to battle before he could reach the woods. Therefore on 10 August he was handed a crushing defeat by the duke in front of Saint-Quentin. His army attempted to extract itself to the east of the city, but upon entering a plateau with his cavalry routed, the infantry was bombarded relentlessly for four hours. Only some small portions of the army under Condé and Nevers were able to withdraw to La Fère. During the combat 6000 Frenchmen were killed, and around 600 French nobles were taken prisoner, including, the duc de Montpensier, Marshal Saint-André, Montmorency himself and his fourth son the sieur de Montbéron. It was the first total defeat for the French army since Pavia. While there were fewer French casualties than at Pavia, the battle was at a far more dangerous location for France.

The destruction of Montmorency's army was a disaster for France. Henri lacked present troops, generals, and supplies. The remaining intact French forces were largely occupied far away in Italy. Therefore the capital was in theory open to attack from the Spanish. In the climate of panic some Parisians turned on their Protestant neighbours, besieging a secret Protestant service that was taking place at the rue Saint-Jacques. At court, bitter recriminations were levelled against Montmorency for his incompetence. In a couplet that spread throughout the kingdom it was noted that the people 'excused Henri, and cursed Montmorency'.

While France descended into fearful panic with the loss of Montmorency's army, the town of Saint-Quentin was able to hold out long enough for the king to hurriedly recall Guise from Italy, and invest him with the authority of lieutenant-general of the kingdom, granting him general command of the kingdom for the emergency. Guise's brother Lorraine took up a position approximating Montmorency's domestic responsibilities. With the fall of Saint-Quentin on 27 August, another of Montmorency's relatives, his nephew Coligny fell into Spanish hands. During his imprisonment he would convert to Protestantism. Having taken Saint-Quentin, the Spanish decided against a thrust towards the largely undefended Paris, and moved on to sacking other Picard towns, among them Ham, Le Catelet, Noyon and Chauny.

=== Captivity ===
Guise, now lieutenant-general of the kingdom, assembled a new army at Compiègne and was able to drive the Spanish from the kingdom.

Montmorency's imprisonment caused great anguish for the king, who began to send out peace feelers in the hope of quickly securing his return to the court. Alongside his desire to be reunited with his favourite, he was increasingly cautious about leaving the Lorraine family to have unchecked pre-eminence in his court without Montmorency as a counterweight. He was also concerned that he could no longer finance the war. Meanwhile, with Guise ascendant in Montmorency's absence, the duc secured the capture of Calais from England in January 1558, bringing the city that had been in English hands for 200 years back into the control of the French crown. By this means Guise made his name as 'the greatest captain in France'. According to later testimony by Coligny, the Lorraine government showed considerable hostility to the captive Constable.

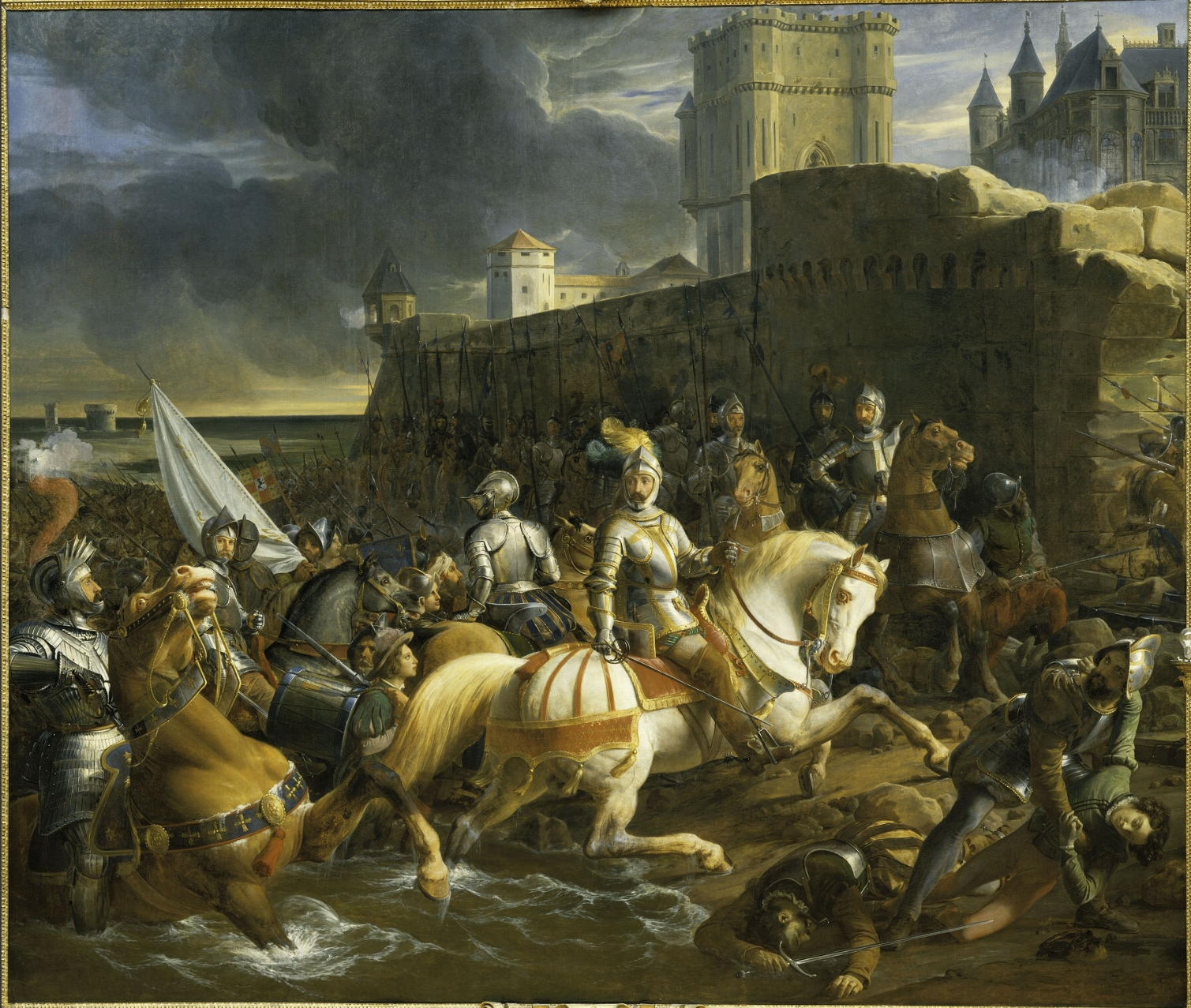
The Siege of Calais by François-Édouard Picot. Guise's crowning glory, the capture of Calais during Montmorency's captivity

With Montmorency's influence in the kingdom therefore weakened, some of his clients broke away from him and became clients of the Lorraine family. One such noble who was sensitive to the way the wind was blowing was the governor of Berry La Châtre who had long been in Montmorency's sphere.

At first, Montmorency was transported by the victorious army to Saint-Omer, and from there he was moved to Ghent. In the initial reports that reached the king, it was said that he had died. However, when Henri learnt that Montmorency was in fact alive, but badly injured, he hurried to despatch the famed surgeon Ambroise Paré to him, though his captors refused to allow this. Several of the king's doctors were allowed to see him while he was staying in Enghein, and he began to heal. From his captivity in Ghent, Montmorency was not sitting idly. Hoping to facilitate a peace, Montmorency established marriage proposals aimed at sealing a deal - in one match up, the daughter of the king Elisabeth de Valois would marry Philip of Spain's son Don Carlos and in another the dauphin would marry Philip's widowed sister the princess of Portugal. This second arrangement would have the advantage to Montmorency of avoiding a proximate relationship between the dauphin and his rivals the Lorraine brothers. For a while the king listened to Montmorency, and agreed to postpone his ascent to the marriage. However, with Guise's victory at Calais, the marriage of his niece to the dauphin was committed to by the king, and the ceremony celebrated on 24 April. At the top table during the wedding meal, the Montmorency family were thin on the ground. Only Montmorency's nephew Cardinal de Châtillon was there to represent the family at this key marriage. For the celebrations, Guise possessed the staff of the Grand Maître during Montmorency's absence.

In an assertion of their ascendency, the Lorraine family moved against Montmorency's nephew Andelot in May 1558, overseeing his arrest on charge of heresy. Andelot had been working as a negotiator for the peace accords with Spain and it was the Spanish who tipped off the Lorraine brothers to this opportunity. He would not be in captivity for long, and by July Montmorency had already secured his release, with Lorraine being forced to admit that the information he had been provided was intended to dupe him into falsely accusing Andelot. Henri was increasingly uneasy with their power, as was the Lorraine family's former patron Diane. Diane took this moment to realign herself towards Montmorency, and arranged a marriage between her granddaughter and the duc de Montmorency's second son Damville. She had grown weary of the Lorraine brothers, who now had no need of her in their time of ascendency. The marriage would take place at Montmorency's château de Chantilly in January 1559, with Montmorency inviting the king and the queen to attend. Montmorency and Diane would dine together every evening in January as a reflection of their new political accord.

The king was frustrated by the obstinacy Guise showed towards continuing the war, and the need to be reunited with Montmorency which Guise was thereby denying him. In reflection of his increasing distaste for the duc de Guise, when Guise requested the office of Grand Maître be transferred to him from Montmorency in late 1558 as a further reward for his victory at Calais, the king refused. Guise seeing the way the wind was blowing, departed court in frustration on 1 December.

In light of the great wealth of Montmorency, and his importance to the king, Savoy set his ransom at a great amount, 600,000 livres. The first instalment of Montmorency's huge ransom was paid in late 1558, and therefore he was released from the duke of Savoy's captivity. Montmorency was released from captivity for two days on 10 October on Philip's instruction in the hopes his presence would break the king's resolve to continue the war. Waiting impatiently for his favourite, Henri eventually resolved to ride out and meet him. He found the Constable alone on the road, and after a long embrace the two travelled back to Amiens. They spent every minute of the following two days together, with Montmorency sleeping in the king's chamber. Montmorency complained to the king of the ambition of the Lorraines, with the king adding his own complaints about them onto his, upon receiving word of their discussions, Guise was so dispirited that he departed court to go and hunt at one of his châteaux. After leaving back to captivity, Henri wrote to his favourite "Nothing in the world can turn me from the love I have for you". It would indeed be the renewal of the king's affections for him that were the prime result of his paroled release, with little immediate developments towards peace.

=== Return to power ===
With the 200,000 couronnes required for the first instalment of his ransom paid, Montmorency again returned to the centre of political power. A thousand riders came out to meet him as he travelled back to Paris in December. He arrived at court in Saint-Germain on 21 December 1558, and set about re-establishing his dominance over the court in just the way it had been prior to his capture. That same day Lorraine returned his signet ring that he had received from the king back in 1557. Henri asked the Cardinal why he and Guise had stopped attending council, to which Lorraine replied that "he [Lorraine] did not wish to pass as Montmorency's valet". With his return, Guise's authority as lieutenant-general of the kingdom was cancelled. Henri also promised Montmorency that his eldest son would inherit his office of Grand Maître upon his death. Guise was however able to delay this from coming to pass, and the appointment of Montmorency's second son Damville as a Marshal. Around Christmas in court the situation was explosive and matters almost came to blows in the halls of Saint-Germain. On 24 December Guise asked two courtiers to secretly watch him, and then challenged Montmorency's eldest son to a duel over a slight (likely the matter of his having blamed Guise for failing to get Papal dispensation to annul his secret marriage). Montmorency's son swore to the duc that he had done nothing to dishonour him and then departed to inform Montmorency and the king. Henri was unsettled by the episode, but Montmorency laughed it off. In the wake of this, those opposed to the influence of his relatives retreated. For example Blaise de Monluc who had usurped the position of colonel-general of the infantry in the Constable's absence, resigned the charge in favour of Montmorency's nephew François de Coligny d'Andelot. In Picardy, Coligny returned to his charge as governor and was now joined by Andelot as his lieutenant-general. At liberty, Montmorency continued to work for peace. This did not mean he was blind to the considerations of the war however, should peace fail, and he oversaw the fortification of Péronne and incited Süleyman into attacking the Empire, so that the Emperor would not be in a position to seek the return of the three bishoprics.

=== Treaty of Cateau-Cambrésis ===
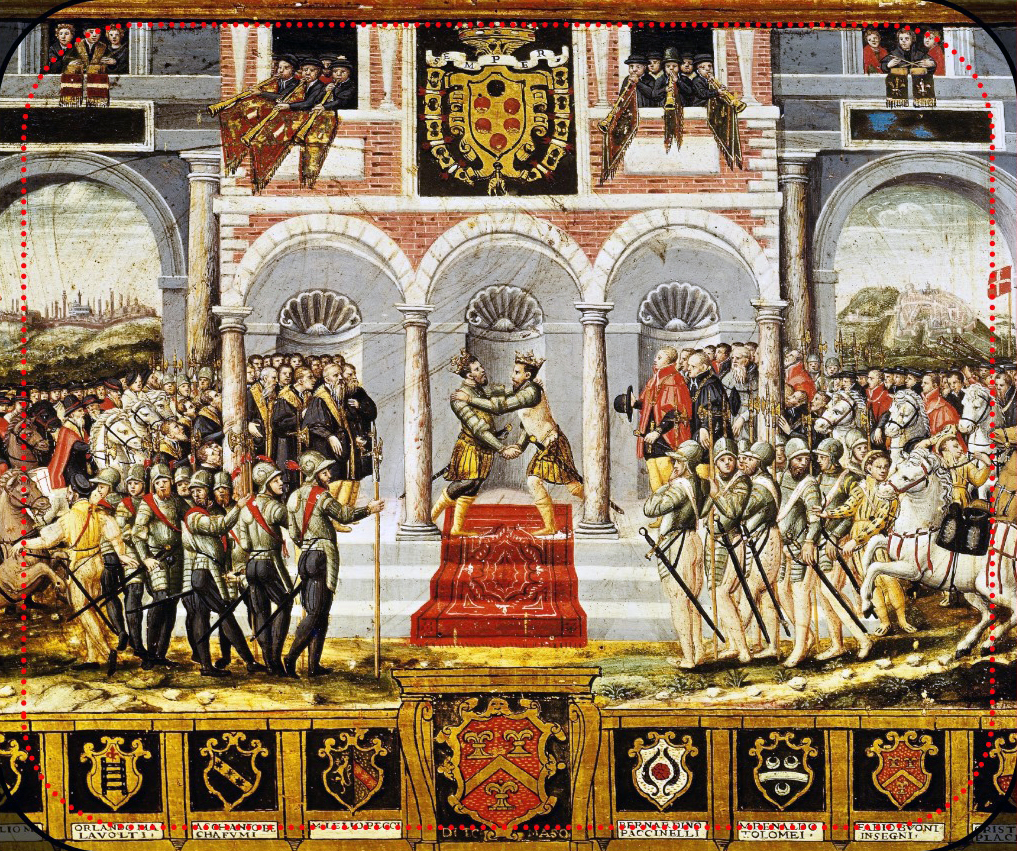
Henry II and Philip II embrace at Cateau-Cambrésis

As early as July 1558, Saint-André and Montmorency, both captives, had a conference at Oudernarde at which they agreed on the importance of securing a peace. With their discussions finalised, Saint-André went to the princ van Oranj (prince of Oranj) to inform him that the king wished to negotiate a settlement with Spain. Both Montmorency and Saint-André conducted negotiations with their captors through September, alongside the secretary L'Aubespine, hosting some of the talks in their chambers. A formal conference for the end of the war was begun at Cercamp on 8 October 1558 while Montmorency was still in captivity. The peace talks were impeded by the extent of the Habsburg demands; the French were to cede Piedmont, Calais, Corsica, Luxembourg and any other Italian possessions. Montmorency protested the ceding of Piedmont, arguing that this Italian territory should be left with France, however the Spanish countered that the mountains were the natural border that should be abided by. Lorraine was able to convince Montmorency of the necessity of jettisoning Piedmont. Initially these demands were viewed as too much, and the conference was at risk of breaking up. However Montmorency, keenly aware the collapse of the peace talks would mean his return to captivity, persuaded the king to continue the negotiations. In this he was supported by a new ally, the king's mistress Diane. In a stormy council meeting on 15 November, Henri announced that he was determined to make peace, even if it involved ceding almost all of these French conquests in Italy. Henri informed the council that he had called them, not to debate the proposal but merely to inform them of his decision, only Archbishop of Vienne objected to the king in the meeting, but he was told to be quiet.

Catherine and other courtiers were horrified at this conciliatory approach, and implored Henri not to cede French Italian possessions. Henri had indeed promised Guise personally that French Piedmont would not be given away at the peace table. On 30 November 1558, Guise told the king that he would rather his head be cut off than admit the treaty proposals were honourable. He sought to publicly embarrass the king by publicly reminding him of his promise to transfer the office of Grand Maître to him. The captains such as Brissac and Monluc were also disgusted by the 'betrayal of their military sacrifices'. Monluc would later write that Montmorency and Saint-André were the prime reasons why the king established the peace, but that he did not blame them for the misfortunes of the peace and that which followed, as they too were victims of the troubles that were to follow. Montmorency was blamed by the war party for convincing the king of this approach, but Henri defended his favourite, arguing to Catherine that the wrongdoer was not Montmorency, who had always acted properly but rather those who had pushed for the resumption of the war after the truce of Vaucelles had been negotiated in the first place.

On 2 November 1558 Montmorency, Lorraine and Saint-André departed from the negotiations to meet with the king at Beauvais. Henri was overjoyed to see the Constable again. The Lorraine brothers later alleged that it was at this time that the two men entered into a secret agreement for the terms of the peace. Montmorency returned to the talks on 7 November, and therefore a second session began that day which would last until the end of the month. In the second session the matter of the parties' allies was considered, for France the kingdom of Navarre, for Spain the duchy of Savoy. The claims of the king of Navarre to Spanish Navarre were abandoned. Matters then turned to England, with the Spanish and English delegation demanding the return of Calais to English control. Lorraine could not countenance this, and although it was the conquest of his political rival, Montmorency's loyalty to France would not allow him to support handing over Calais either. On 30 November negotiations were adjourned for 6 weeks, in part so Montmorency and Saint-André could sort out their ransoms.

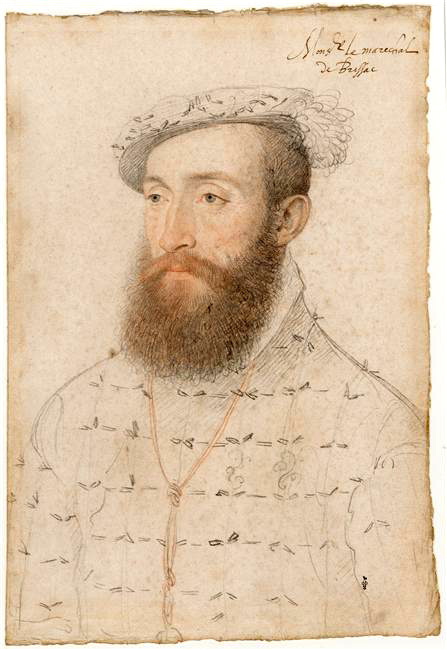
Marshal Brissac one of the chief captains of the final Italian War and opponent of Montmorency at court

Towards the establishment of the peace, Montmorency ordered Brissac to dismantle French fortifications that were present in Piedmont and Montferrat. Brissac greatly resented the order, but complied with what was asked, he further dismissed 12,000 soldiers under his command. The soldiers therefore likewise felt betrayed by the peace.

Upon the resumption of the talks, they were moved to Cateau-Cambrésis, viewed as a more convenient and comfortable location. Montmorency, Saint-André and Lorraine arrived for their resumption on 6 February 1559. By now there was a new queen in England, and Elizabeth proved far more conciliatory as concerned the fate of Calais. Nevertheless discussions became very heated, and Montmorency advised Henri to make the appearance of preparing for war to ensure that they got the peace they hoped for through the recruiting of new captains. The issue of Calais was finally cracked on 12 March. The French determined that it was necessary to treat England and Spain as separate peace treaties to progress. For Calais, France agreed to either return the city to England within 8 years, or failing that provide compensation to England of 500,000 couronnes d'or (golden crowns). England would forfeit its rights to Calais or compensation if they committed aggression against Scotland or France.

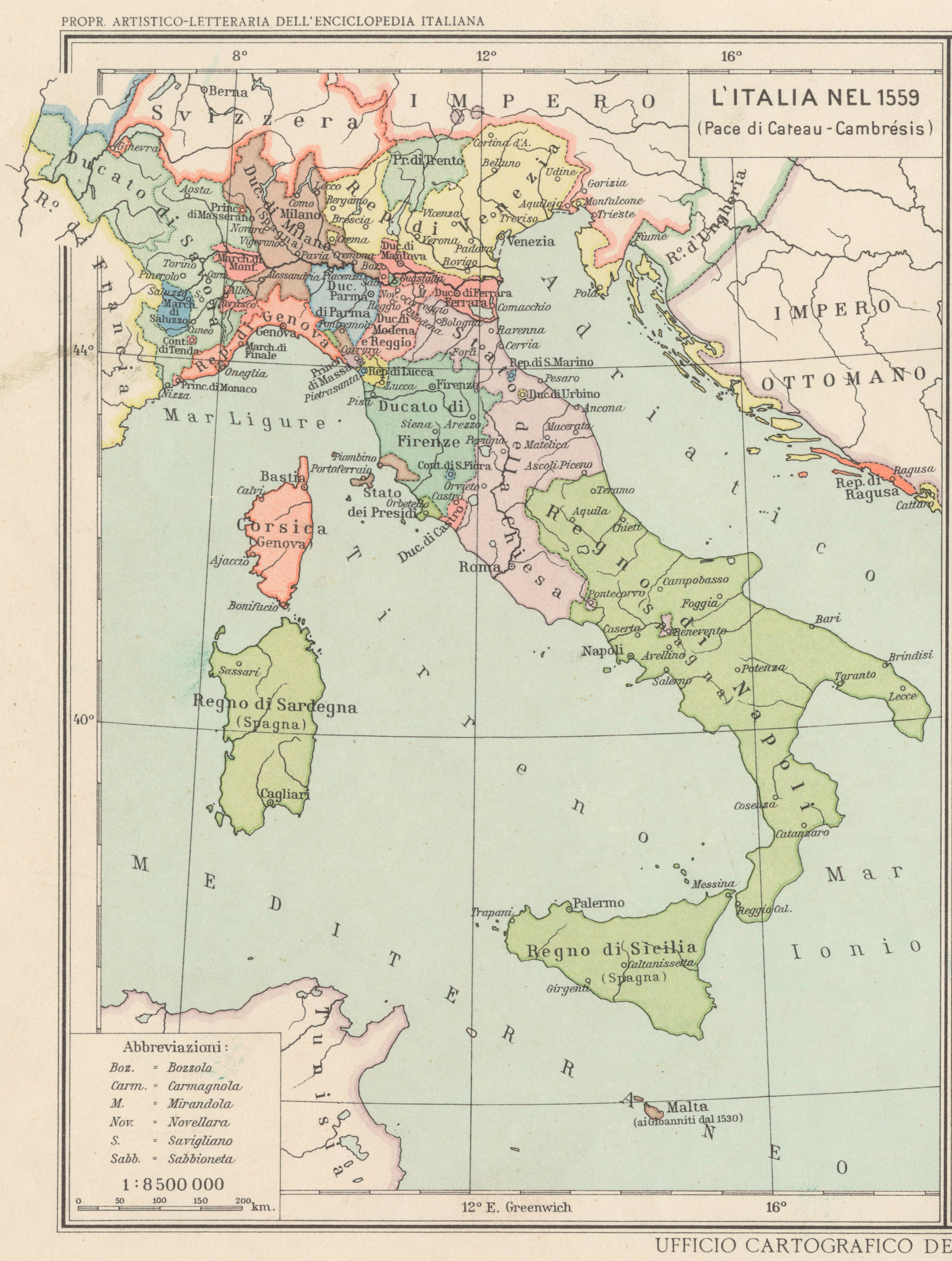
Italy after the execution of the Peace of Cateau-Cambrésis

On 4 April 1559 the Peace of Cateau-Cambrésis was signed, it constituted two separate peace treaties, one between France and Spain, the other between France and England. France would maintain Calais, the Three Bishoprics (Metz, Toul and Verdun), Saluzzo and several towns in the Piedmont, but return all other conquests. Philip for his part would return to France Ham, Saint-Quentin, Thérouanne and Catelet. Philip II agreed to marry Elisabeth de Valois, a similar arrangement to the one proposed by Montmorency in early November. The peace was bitterly resented by the majority of French military captains. The queen of Navarre had written to Montmorency in November urging him to represent her husband's claims to Spanish occupied southern Navarre, however this would not form part of the peace settlement. The finalisation of the specific terms of Montmorency's ransom payments also formed a component of the peace.

=== Concord with England ===
With peace now established, Montmorency worked to push friendship with England. At this time the great hostages France had agreed to provide England as part of the treaty arrived in London, while the English hostages were received with great pageantry by Henri. For the release of common prisoners of war, imprisoned in the galleys of their enemies, Montmorency signed a separate convention with the duke of Alba by which the French released the Spanish captives in their possession and the Spanish did likewise for the French. The only monetary compensation demanded for the common soldiers was for the cost of their food during captivity, therefore France paid Spain around 30,000 couronnes. Instead of providing the sum in cash, Henri released 9 Spanish captains of value without ransom.

=== War on heresy ===
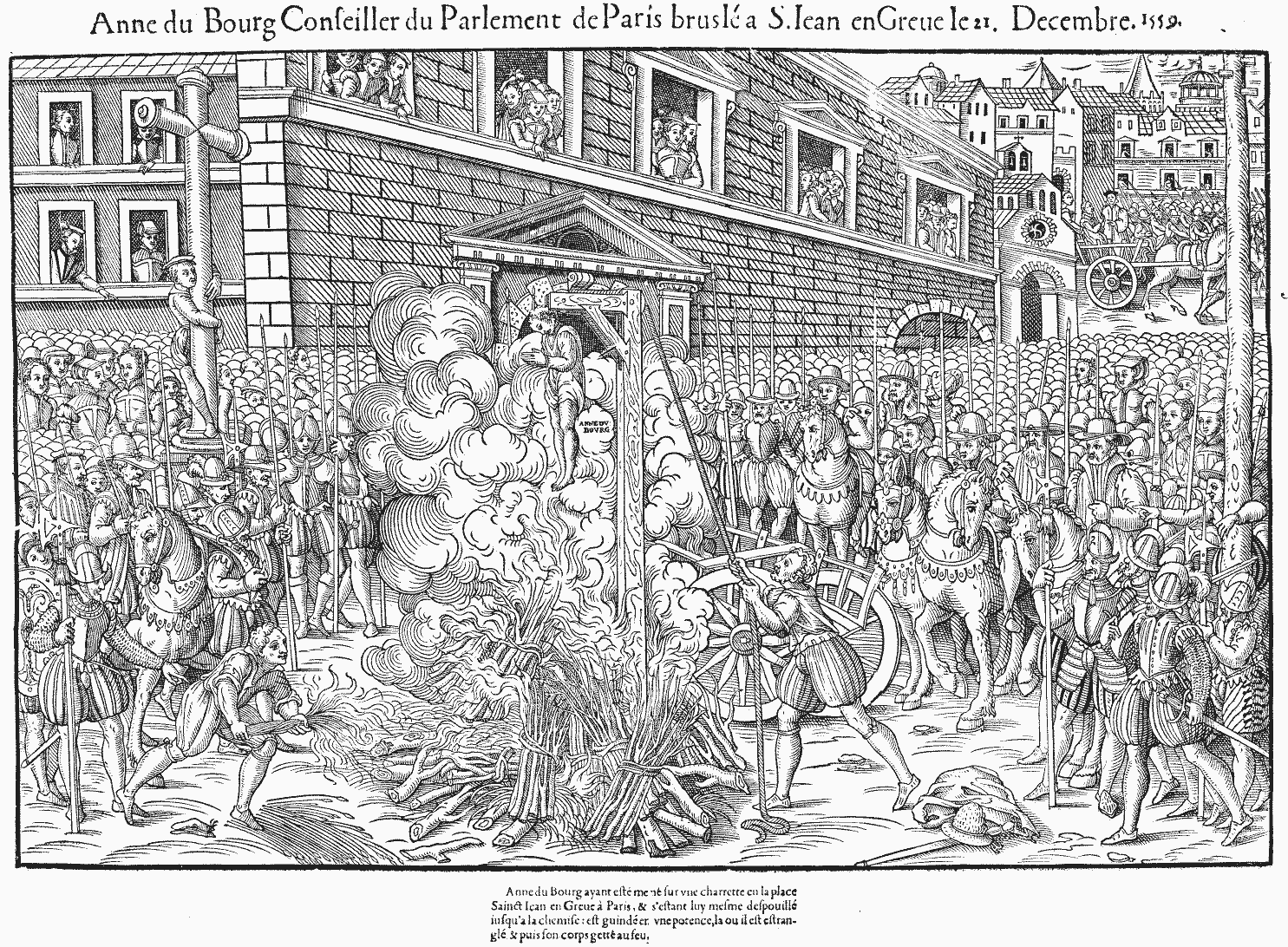
Burning of Anne du Bourg at the stake

On 10 June 1559, Henri decided to visit the Paris Parlement to observe the Parlementaires in session. He was inspecting the body at the urgings of radical Catholic deputies who had warned him that the court was filled with Protestants who wanted to strip him of the authority of his kingship. His visit would be one of the most important in the history of the Parlement, and he was accompanied for the occasion by Montmorency and the Lorraine brothers. In the session that followed, several deputies, including one Anne du Bourg voiced opinions that bordered on lèse majesté (defamation to the dignity of the king), and Henri was unable to tolerate what was said particularly in light of fact it was done in the presence of his favourites. As a result eight Parlementaires were arrested, Henri commanding Montmorency to arrest them despite the traditional protections of their office, with Anne du Bourg being burned at the stake in December 1559.

At this time the king was determined to reinforce his measures against heresy. While with Montmorency at his Château d'Écouen a new edict was formulated to stiffen the persecution. This edict came at a time when Montmorency was ascendant at court.

== Fall ==
=== Death of the king ===
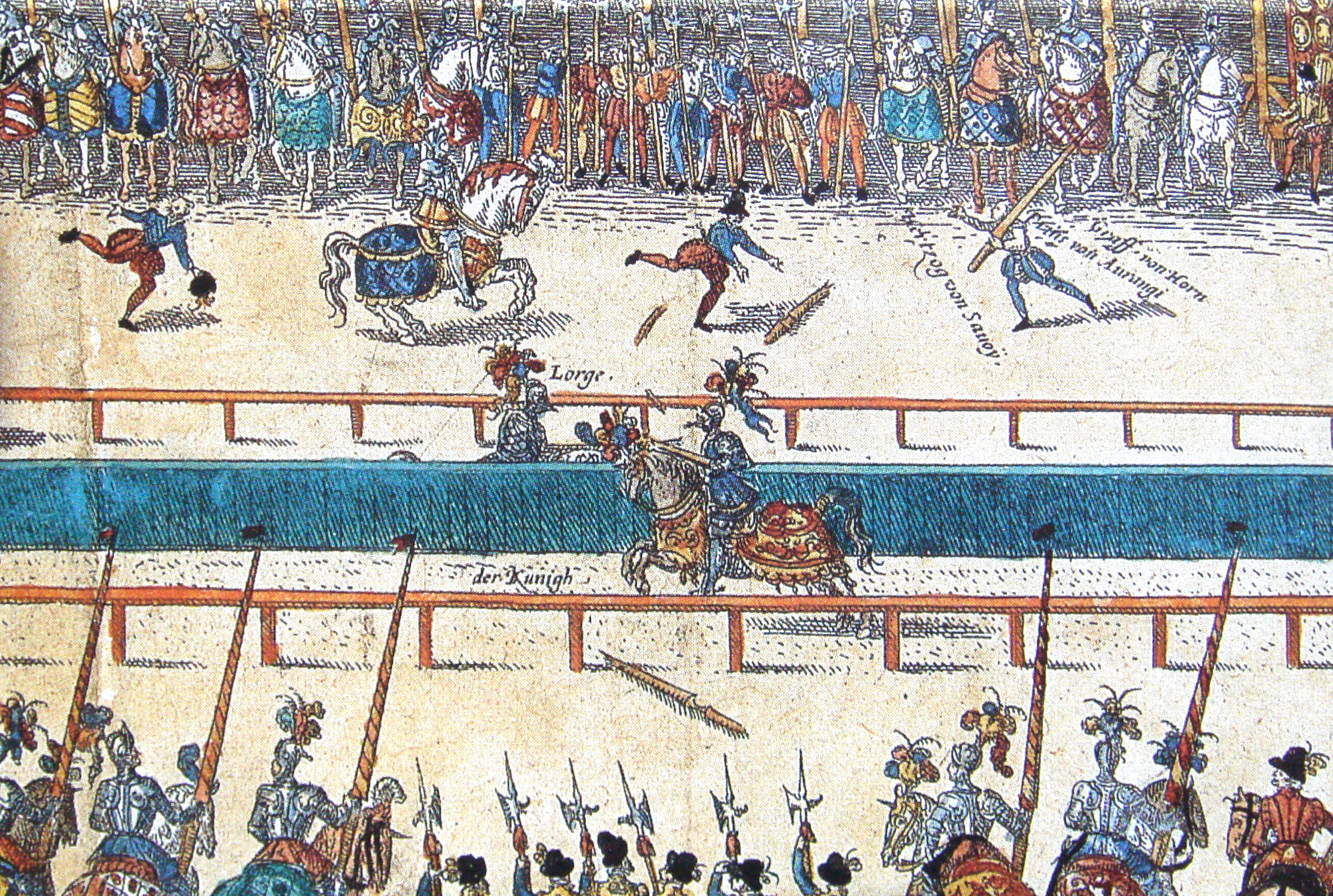
Joust to celebrate the Peace of Cateau-Cambrésis at which Henri II sustained his fatal injury

On 30 June 1559, Henri was participating in a tournament to celebrate the recently signed peace. In a joust with the comte de Montgommery, captain of his Scots Guard his opponents lance pierced his visor, with a shard of wood embedding itself in his eye. Montmorency and Tavannes rushed forward, holding the king in their arms before they carried him to the Palais des Tournelles with the assistance of Guise, Condé and Martigues. In the following days Henri slowly and agonisingly died while attended to by the greatest doctors of the age. During his periods of unconsciousness Catherine ensured Montmorency was kept away from the king, but when he was conscious he was able to call for Montmorency to be with him. Guise began discussing a potential indictement of Montmorency on the grounds of failing to fasten Henri's visor properly. The Constable was agitated, and brought the body of a man murdered in Paris to the court so that the effects of Henri's wounds could be analysed on the skull. After experimenting on the corpse the physician concluded that Henri's wound would not be fatal but that he might lose an eye. Montmorency reported optimistically to the English ambassador that the king was on the mend. Henri's condition then took a turn for the worse as blood poisoning set in. Ultimately Montmorency began preparations for what was to come in the reign of Henri's son, and to this end entered contact with the king of Navarre to unite their political interests.

In his capacity as Grand Maître Montmorency had an important role to play in the events that followed the king's death, bringing 48 monks into the mortuary chamber to perform their chants.

=== Palace revolution of the Lorraine brothers ===
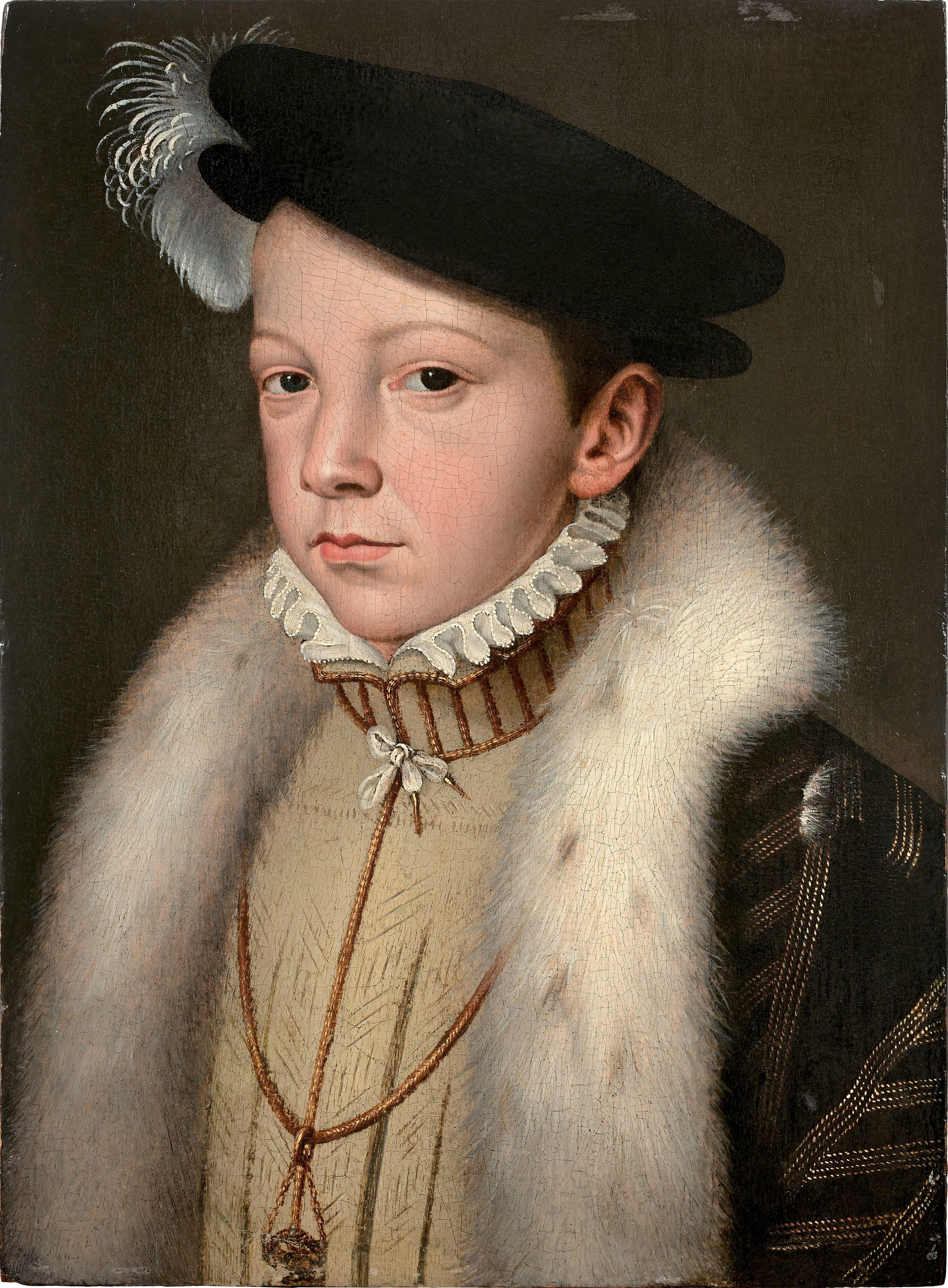
François II who succeeded Henri II and allowed Montmorency to be excluded from the government

With Henri dead, the Lorraine family wasted little time in seizing the opportunity of their close proximity to the new king. Montmorency was unavoidably occupied with his responsibilities to guard the body of the late king, and remained with the body at the Hôtel des Tournelles alongside Saint-André while the court generally departed to the Louvre. Therefore Guise and Lorraine occupied the Louvre palace which had in the reign of Henri been reserved for the usage of Montmorency and the king's mistress, in so doing they took possession of the young king. Catherine served as the Lorraine families ally in these moves against Montmorency and Diane as she despised both figures. Her hatred of Montmorency derived from his détente with Diane and his alleged description of her as a mere 'merchants daughter'. She also despised the peace of Cateau-Cambrésis, which had destroyed the French position in Italy, and held him to be the peace's architect. Montmorency's apartments were taken by the duc de Guise, while Jacques d'Humières took over Saint-André's, and Lorraine usurped Diane's.

At the funeral of the king at Saint-Denis the effigy which had adorned the coffin was removed and the corpse lowered into the pit. The great officers of state then all threw their batons into the hole on top of the coffin. Montmorency had the responsibility to cry the (traditional since 1515) declaration "The king is dead. Long live king François, second of his name, by the grace of God most Christian king of France". The duc de Guise then raised the royal standard, as he assumed the role of grand Chambellan for the purpose of the ceremony.

The Lorraines furthered this palace revolution with an assertion of control over the military, church and the kingdoms finances. Montmorency was informed of this on 11 July 1559 when the king told him, that it was his wish going forward for Guise to handle his kingdoms military affairs, and Lorraine to handle the kingdoms financial situation. Montmorency was told by the king that his presence at court was un-necessary. François had long held a distaste for Montmorency, who his father had compelled him to respect with the address of compère. Andelot was again dispossessed of the charge of colonel-general, this time in favour of the vicomte de Martigues. The specifics of the administration was however to be left to the secretaries to execute, a marked departure from the hands on administration Montmorency had preferred during his ascendency. Only several days into the young boys reigns, ambassadors were reporting home on the ascendency of the Lorraine family over the crown. The young king's mother initially endorsed this arrangement, and went along with the dismissal of Montmorency and the Bourbon princes from power.

Montmorency wrote urgent appeals to Navarre to come to court so they could present a united from against the Lorraine administration, however Navarre stalled. Navarre did not feel prepared to confront the power of the Lorraine brothers, and had sour memories of how little Montmorency had done to advance the territorial interests of his kingdom during the negotiations of Cateau-Cambrésis. Indeed, Montmorency had rarely acknowledged him during the reign of Henri and therefore in Navarre's eyes there was a probability that this was some form of trap. However, according to Navarre's wife Jeanne, Montmorency had shown friendship to Navarre during the 1550s.

Eventually however he agreed and began marching north alongside his brother the prince de Condé. Montmorency dispatched a secretary to meet with the princes, and his three nephews were also present to meet them in a conference that transpired in early August at Vendôme. Aside from their collective opposition to the Lorraine government, the assembled grandees could agree on little. The only product of the meeting was an agreement for an end to the feud between the Montmorency and the Bourbon-Montpensier family, which had been ongoing for a decade. Having accomplished little, Navarre proceeded on to court, arriving on 18 August 1559, where he did little to assert the opposition's position. Upon his return to his estates in southern France, Navarre affirmed his loyalty to the administration and Catholicism, and was richly rewarded with the addition of Poitou to his governate of Guyenne. Condé for his part was offered the governorship of Picardy to replace Coligny. The chief Bourbon princes were all offered places on the royal council.

As part of the palace revolution, Montmorency was dispossessed of the office of Grand Maître on 17 November 1559, the charge being granted to the duc de Guise, he was further compelled to provide his royal seal to the brothers. By this means Guise gained control of the court. The negotiations to remove him from control of this office were predicated on the receipt of the office of Marshal by his eldest son François. His removal from the centre was not however total, he maintained the office of Constable and the charge of governor of Languedoc (neither of which he had remained in control of in his 1540s disgrace). His daughter Louise was granted the abbey of Maubuisson at this time. His partial maintenance in favour represented one aspect of what made the palace revolution of 1559 far less total than that which accompanied Henri's ascent to power in 1547.

=== Retirement ===
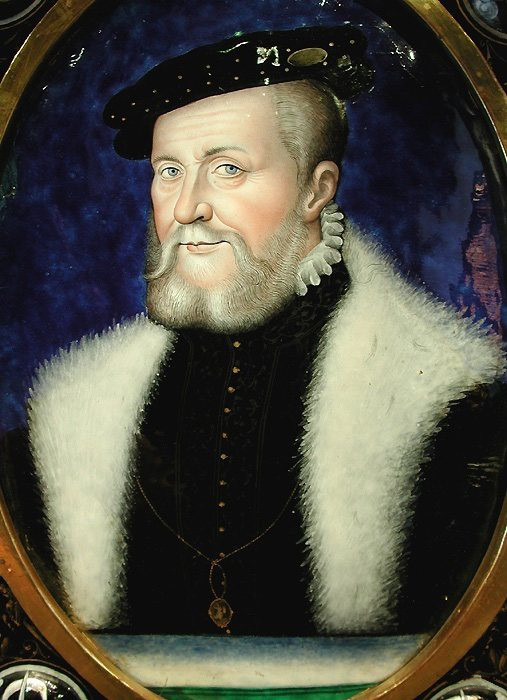
Montmorency in 1556 as painted by Léonard Limousin

Left with little access to power at court, Montmorency withdrew from court to his estates. He told the king that he was 'old and tired'. Not a single award made of office at court in 1560 would be to someone with his backing, the Lorraine brothers meanwhile were responsible for 74% of grants.

The new Lorraine administration was cautious in its policy, and did little to rock the boat in terms of the foreign policy Henri and Montmorency had pursued in their final years. The peace with Spain was maintained and efforts continued towards gaining influence over Scotland.

In that year, a promotion to the Ordre de Saint-Michel of eighteen new chevaliers attracted Montmorency's disapproval. It was around this time that receipt of the award began to be considered a degraded and diluted honour.

The new administration of the kingdom was faced with a financial crisis, and responded with a radical program of austerity and repossessions. To this end various parts of the royal domain that had been alienated under the prior two kings were resumed in control by the crown. Therefore Montmorency was deprived of the comté de Beaumont (valued around 50,000 livres) which had been alienated to him in 1527, alongside the seigneuries of Compiègne and Baux.

=== Conspiracy of Amboise ===
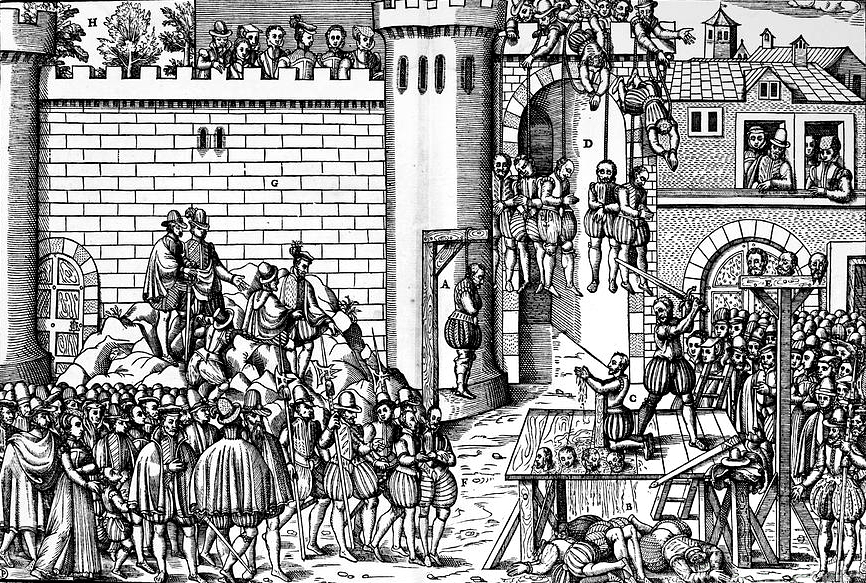
Suppression of the Conspiracy of Amboise, which Montmorency would assist in

In March 1560 a Protestant conspiracy attempted to seize the king while he was staying at the Château d'Amboise. Despite being frozen out of power, Montmorency would not involve himself in the plot, nor would his three Protestant inclined nephews who during this time stuck to rhetoric to express their opposition to the government. Only his nephew Andelot would express sympathy with the plotters, and protest against their repression. Montmorency and his son François took charge of the security measures to keep Paris from falling to any conspiracy. The gates of the city were shut, guards increased and searches conducted. Any strangers present in the city were to leave within 24 hours unless they could justify their presence. Aside from the capture of a few weapons, little suspicious activity was uncovered by these efforts.

The coup would be unsuccessful, but panic and fear of subsidiary uprisings spread across the kingdom. Condé was suspected of involvement, but denied the charge. The Lorraine family began to imagine the possibility that the Bourbon family had executed the plot in league with the Montmorency. Therefore they had Catherine summon Montmorency's nephews to court. Upon his arrival, Coligny argued that the Lorraine brothers had done a poor job recognising the services Montmorency had rendered to the crown, describing the Constable as victim of an injustice. Montmorency was forced to defend his innocence in front of the Parlement, making a speech in which he denounced the conspiracy, while taking shots at the Lorraine government. In the days that followed the conspiracy, the Lorraine government promulgated a pardon of those who had participated with solely religious motivation to present a petition, thereby differentiating 'heresy' from 'sedition'.

As early as June of 1560, Montmorency began to consider the possibility of a reconciliation with the Lorraine government in return for the granting of the comté de Dammartin to him which had been stripped from him in the palace revolution, however for the moment little came of this. Baumgartner suggests that Montmorency's lack of interest in joining with his nephews, implies that his retirement was not a source of significant resentment.

On 21 August 1560, the Assembly of Notables that had been convoked by the crown met at Fontainebleau. Montmorency arrived in force for the event, accompanied by his three Châtillon nephews and sons, alongside a broader entourage of 1600 followers of whom 800 were noblemen. This large show of strength was intended as a display of his power in the hopes of defending his interests, an illustration to those who thought his days of power were behind him. On the third day of the Assembly, his nephew Coligny presented several petitions for the consideration of the Assembly, that argued that temples be granted for Protestant worship. The petitions were unsigned, but Coligny assured the notables that he could attain 10,000 signatures if necessary. The duc de Guise shot back that he could get a million signatures for a counter petition. In the end the Assembly agreed to convoke an Estates General, which was to meet on 10 December, and a religious council which would meet on 20 January 1561.

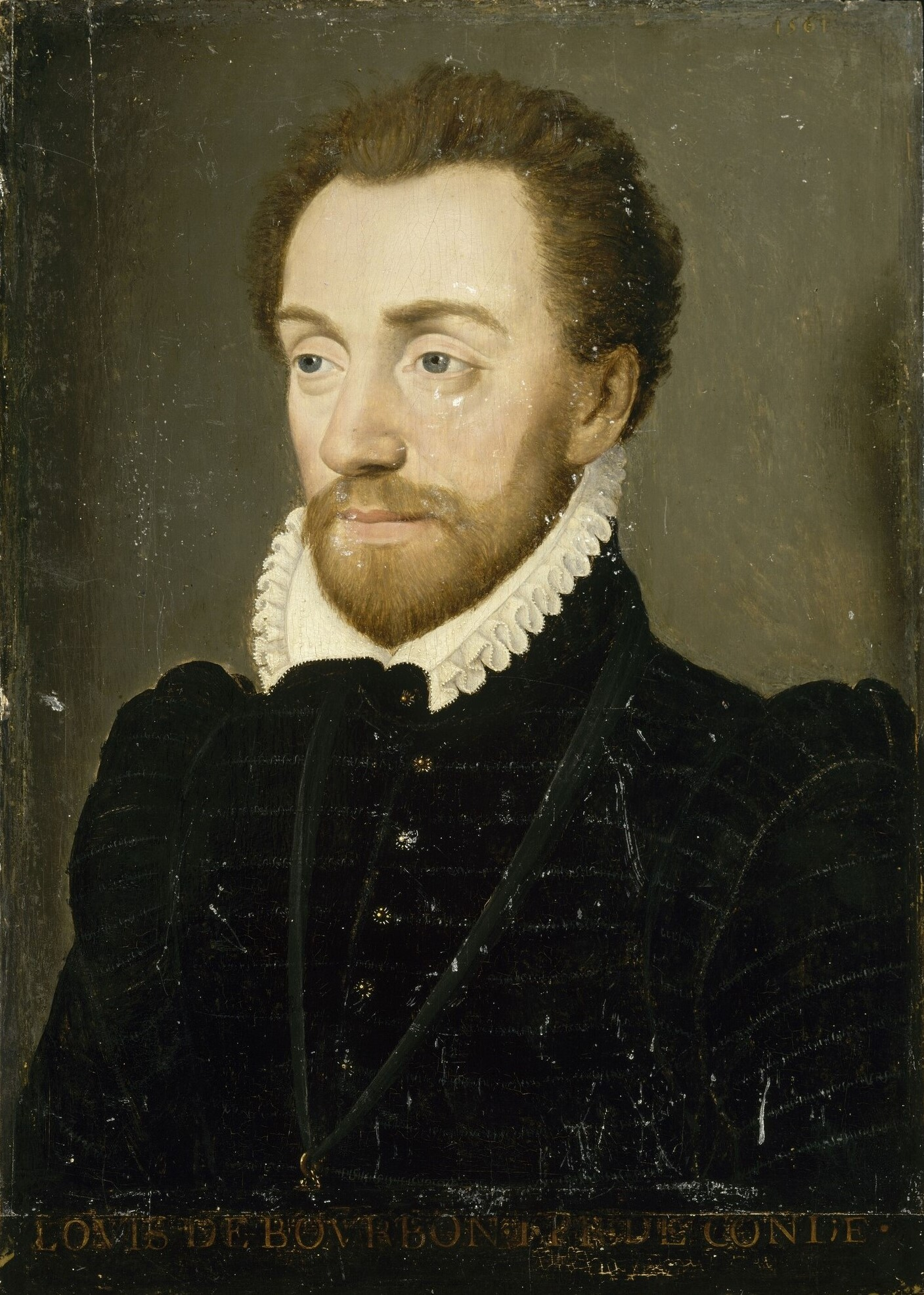
Louis I, Prince of Condé often characterised as the 'silent partner' of the Conspiracy of Amboise

Condé, increasingly fearful of his position began to consider his options of how to proceed. He wrote to the vidame de Chartres and Montmorency urging both men to provide assistance to him against the Lorraine government. Montmorency rebuffed Condé's advance, while Chartres promised his support against all but the royal family. He was promptly arrested and thrown into the Bastille on 29 August.

As testimony implicating Condé in the various disorders that had racked the kingdom in 1560 continued to be received by the Lorraine government of the kingdom, the king ordered all governors to return to their governates, in preparation to mobilise if the Bourbon prince tried to more openly rebel. Montmorency and Guise were excluded from this order, both men allowed to remain at court through the crisis. Condé and his brother Navarre were meanwhile summoned to present themselves at court. On 30 October 1561 the Bourbon princes arrived at court, and Condé was promptly arrested and tried for treason.

Meanwhile at court, Catherine was growing increasingly uneasy with the domination of the government that the Lorraine brothers enjoyed. To this end she reached out to her former enemy Montmorency in September 1561 with a letter expressing considerable friendship, sounding him out to see whether he was someone she could turn to.

== Return to power ==
=== Death of François II ===
Charles IX at the time of his accession

With the sudden death of the young François II on 5 December 1560, Catherine negotiated an agreement with the king of Navarre by which she secured the regency for her second son (only 10 years old) Charles IX and Navarre became lieutenant-general of the kingdom. By this appointment, Navarre became the overall authority for the military of the kingdom, indeed the queen hoped that his authority would dilute that of the Constable. It indeed transpired that Navarre's authority cut into the prerogatives of the Constable. Montmorency was also an important element in the new order, and had already been marching on court with a large escort upon having heard word of the young king's illness. At the coronation ceremony, a dispute in precedence developed between the new king's brother the duc d'Orléans (future Henri III) and Montmorency. Montmorency resented that Catherine gave primary precedence to Orléans over the peers of the realm, and refused to abide it.

Navarre quickly tried to exert his newfound authority, and on 5 February 1561 threatened that if Guise was not removed from court that he, Coligny and Montmorency would depart. He further demanded that Guise be forced to surrender the office of Grand Maître through which he held such sway at court. Catherine saw the danger to her position in the move, and acted fast: she got the young king to beg Montmorency not to leave the court, and Montmorency acquiesced. In the new political arrangement, the court was composed of Catherine, Navarre, Montmorency, Coligny and Cardinal de Châtillon. According to the English ambassador state policy was to be decided by Catherine, Navarre and Montmorency. The Lorraine family and their clients were frozen out of the power they had enjoyed during the reign of François.

Returning to the centre of power, Montmorency also regained the capacity to live in the Louvre, and would do so on a regular basis during the 1560s, despite his possession of grand hôtels in the capital, of which he had around four.

Saint-André, who like the Lorraine brothers was alienated from the new administration, set to work turning Montmorency against the Protestant aligned grandees. He succeeded in bringing Montmorency into dispute with his nephew Coligny.

=== Formation of the 'Triumvirate' ===
During Easter 1561, there was fear among some French nobles that the royal family itself was about to become Protestant, as it was rumoured that Catherine and her son the king had attended Protestant services. This development alongside the entry into the royal council of the Protestant Condé and his nephew Coligny inspired a great fear from Montmorency as to the direction of the kingdom's religious policy - these figures being greatly associated with the Protestant cause.

Resultingly, he reached a détente (known to history as the 'Triumvirate') with his great rival the duc de Guise, and Saint-André and the three agreed to work together for the preservation of Catholicism and the suppression of 'heresy' on 8 April 1561, Easter. The reconciliation between Montmorency and his great enemy Guise was overseen by the aged Cardinal de Tournon. He was driven towards this new alignment by the failure of Catherine to 'properly reward' him for his services to the crown by re-establishing him as the prime courtier upon the death of François, a position which had instead been given to Navarre. Montmorency greatly resented the senior military command granted to the prince which placed Navarre above him.

The alliance was a muddled affair, composed of men with wildly different politics, as typified by the inclusion of Cardinal de Tournon, who was Ultramontane in disposition and Montmorency, an ardent Gallican. According to the Spanish ambassador Chantonnay, the duc de Montpensier and comte de Brissac also affiliated with this new axis in French politics. The main unifier of the 'Catholic party' was the failure to be given ascendence at court. The Protestants denounced the accord as a 'Triumvirate', comparing the men to Octavian, Antony, and Lepidus, whose arrangement brought about the destruction of the Roman republic and involved the executions of many of their enemies. This name, given by their enemies, has stuck with the accord.

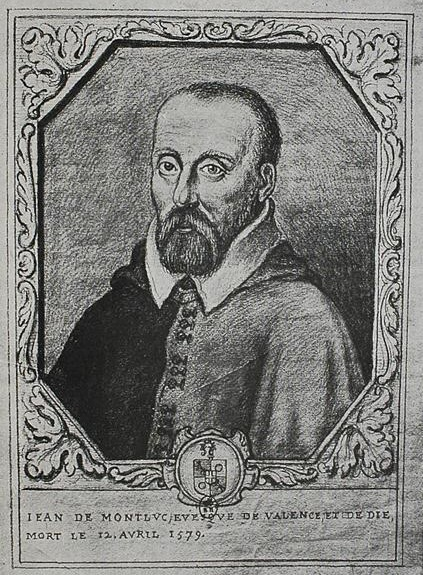
Jean de Monluc, bishop of Valence, whose criticism of the Catholic church enraged the fervent Catholics of court including Montmorency

The first manifestation of this new Catholic alliance was seen on Easter Sunday of that year, with Montmorency and Guise learning of who was to deliver the Easter sermon (Jean de Monluc) and mutually agreeing to not attend. Montmorency had particular distaste for Monluc's sermons, which often critiqued the church and Catholic practices such as the cult of images that he cherished. Instead the Catholic grandees went down to the servants' quarter to hear a more conservative mass delivered by an obscure friar. Cardinal de Tournon provided both men their communion and oversaw the kiss of peace between Guise and Montmorency, burying their rivalry. To the ends of their alliance, support from the Spanish king Philip II was sought.

=== Opposition to government ===
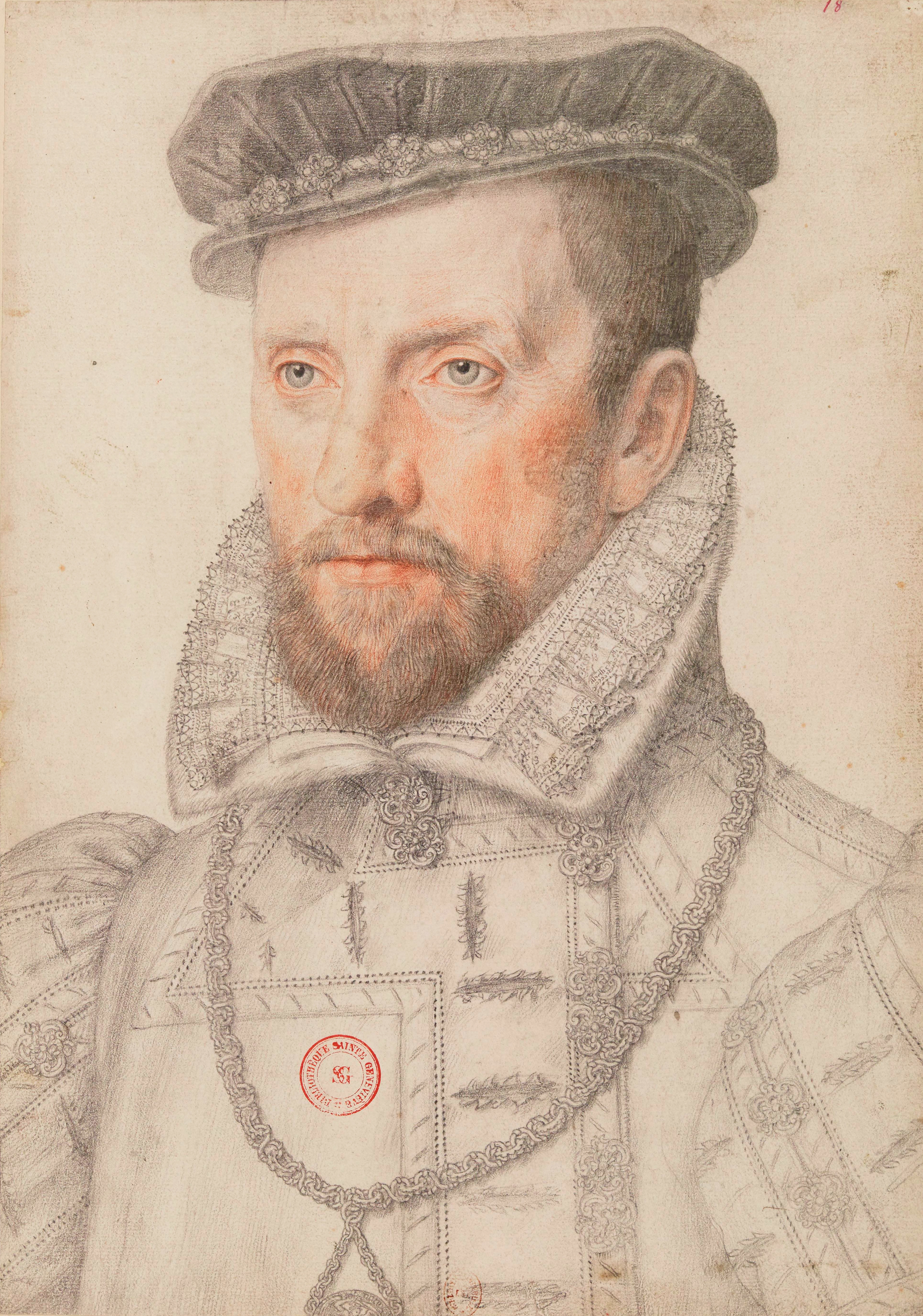
Gaspard II de Coligny, nephew of Montmorency whose religion brought him to oppose his uncle

This new political alignment had the effect of pushing Catherine even closer to her Protestant advisers, in the hopes of offering a counterweight to this newly united opposition. Montmorency for his part broke from his nephews in favour of the Lorraine family. Montmorency gave a stern reprimand to Coligny for allowing Protestant preaching in his quarters at court on Palm Sunday. Montmorency's own eldest son Marshal Montmorency tried to dissuade him from his new alliance, arguing that he was discarding long term friends in favour of an alliance with his greatest enemy, however Montmorency was reinforced in his decision by his wife. Madeleine highlighted that Coligny had betrayed Montmorency's interests by pushing forward the interests of Navarre and Protestantism at the expense of the Constable. Shimizu argues that through this new alliance, Montmorency's religious and political convictions usurped his interests in the political advancement of his family.

The Spanish ambassador believed that Montmorency could use his influence with Navarre to preserve him for the Catholic fold.

The rise to power of Catherine caused Montmorency to lose some members of his fidelity network. For example, the rich seigneur de Lanssac (ambassador to Rome, Spain and the Council of Trent) who had territories in the Angoumois, Poitou and Guyenne defected from his service to hers.

Soon after reaching their accord, Montmorency and the Lorraine network departed from court, Montmorency on 7 April then the duc de Guise on 8 April. Saint-André meanwhile was disgraced by Catherine, but refused to depart court for his government of the Lyonnais.

The poor financial state of the kingdom in this period caused some issue for Montmorency, and in 1561 he drew up a list of the various debts owed to him by his clients and 'creatures'. He calculated himself to be owed 269,000 livres in total.

=== Toleration policy ===
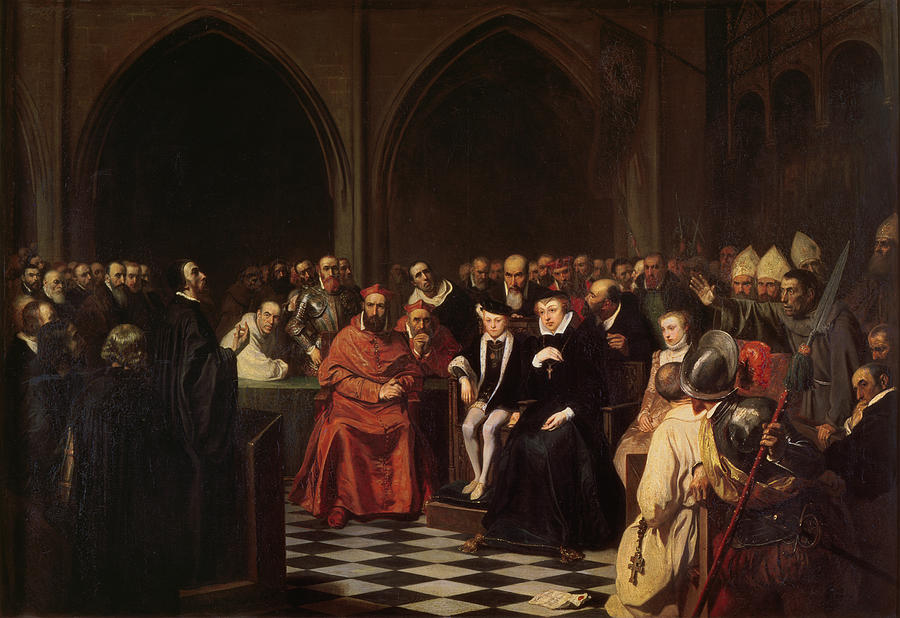
Colloquy of Poissy at which Catherine hoped the Protestant and Catholic creeds could establish a compromise

After the failure of the Colloquy of Poissy to establish a unified creed between the Protestants and Catholics as Lorraine and Catherine had hoped, the 'Catholic party' furthered its divorce from court. With the royal council an increasingly Protestant affair, the duc d'Aumale departed court on 9 October, followed soon after by the Cardinal de Lorraine. On 19 October a grand procession of 700 notables departed court, among them the duc de Guise, cardinal de Guise, duc de Longueville and duc de Nemours. Montmorency joined this mass exodus on 21 October, leaving the royal council little more than a rump composed of the Protestants, Catherine and Navarre. Catherine sent desperate appeals for the departed nobles to return to court.

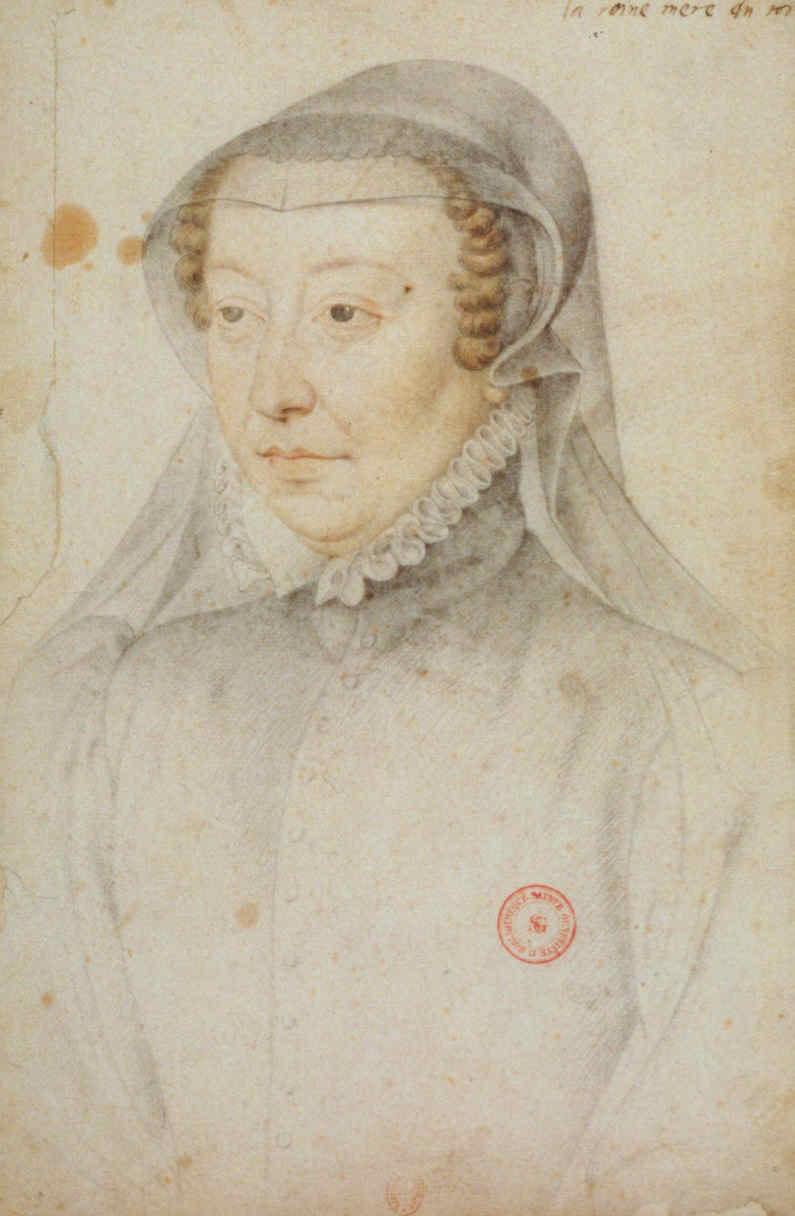
Regent of the kingdom Catherine de' Medici who led the crown towards toleration

Montmorency was present as a member of the assembly of Saint-Germain-en-Laye that was convened by Catherine from 3 to 15 of January 1562 in the hopes of solving the religious question. The assembly was largely dominated by moderate Parlementaires such as Paul de Foix and Christophe de Harlay, however it also featured great nobles like Montmorency and Saint-André (though not the Lorraine brothers, who remained absent from court). On the matter of whether to accord the Protestants' temples, the assembly voted 27-22 against the proposal. A majority of the delegates present however supported allowing Protestant worship. Therefore on 17 January Catherine promulgated the Edict of Saint-Germain by which toleration was granted to Protestantism for the first time, with allowances for worship in the faubourgs (suburbs) of towns.

As a mark of Montmorency's religious temperament during this period, he was collaborating with the bishop of Paris to ascertain just how many Protestants there were in the capital; the conclusion of their collective research was that there were around 5000.

By early 1562, the king of Navarre had been won for the Catholic opposition. He had been promised the kingdom of Sardinia as compensation for his lost territories in Navarre. When Catherine tried to remove Montmorency from court for his opposition to her religious policy, Navarre insisted that if Montmorency were removed, that his Protestant nephews should also be retired from court. Coligny and Andelot therefore both departed from court on 22 February.

Blamed by Catherine for the defection of Navarre to the opposition, Montmorency departed court.

For Coligny, removed from power, there was little prospect of reconciling with Navarre or Saint-André. A reconciliation with his uncle would require such a radical shift in his policies as to be unrealistic. Moreover he was conscious Montmorency was no longer able to dominate the court alone in the way he had during the 1550s and therefore was of limited utility.

== French Wars of Religion ==
=== Wassy ===
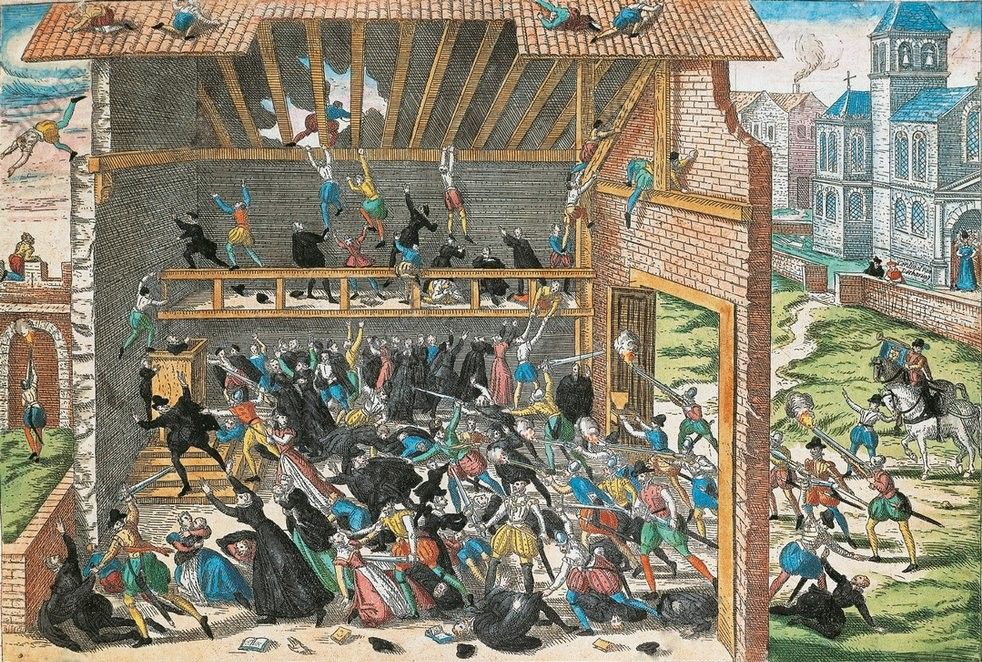
Massacre of the worshippers in the church of Wassy

On 1 March 1562, while travelling back from a meeting with the duke of Württemberg the duc de Guise passed through Wassy, where a Protestant service was ongoing. He and his men proceeded to kill many of the Protestant worshippers, with both sides blaming the other for inciting his slaughter. He decided to march onto Paris, where he was met by Montmorency and Saint-André on route at Nanteuil, who then accompanied him for a grand entrance through the porte Saint-Denis on 16 March, traditional entrance of kings into the capital with a retinue of 3000 men. The grand party was warmly received by the prévôt des marchands (provost of the merchants) and a delegation of the city's notables. They were bolstered in their confidence by the presence of Navarre, who as Premier prince du sang (first prince of the blood) carried important legitimacy for their cause.

This entrance into the capital was despite a request from the regent Catherine that Guise come instead to the court to explain his actions. Having established themselves in the city, the three 'Triumvirs' wrote to Catherine explaining that they were going to stay in Paris despite her requests to stop the city falling into a state of chaos.

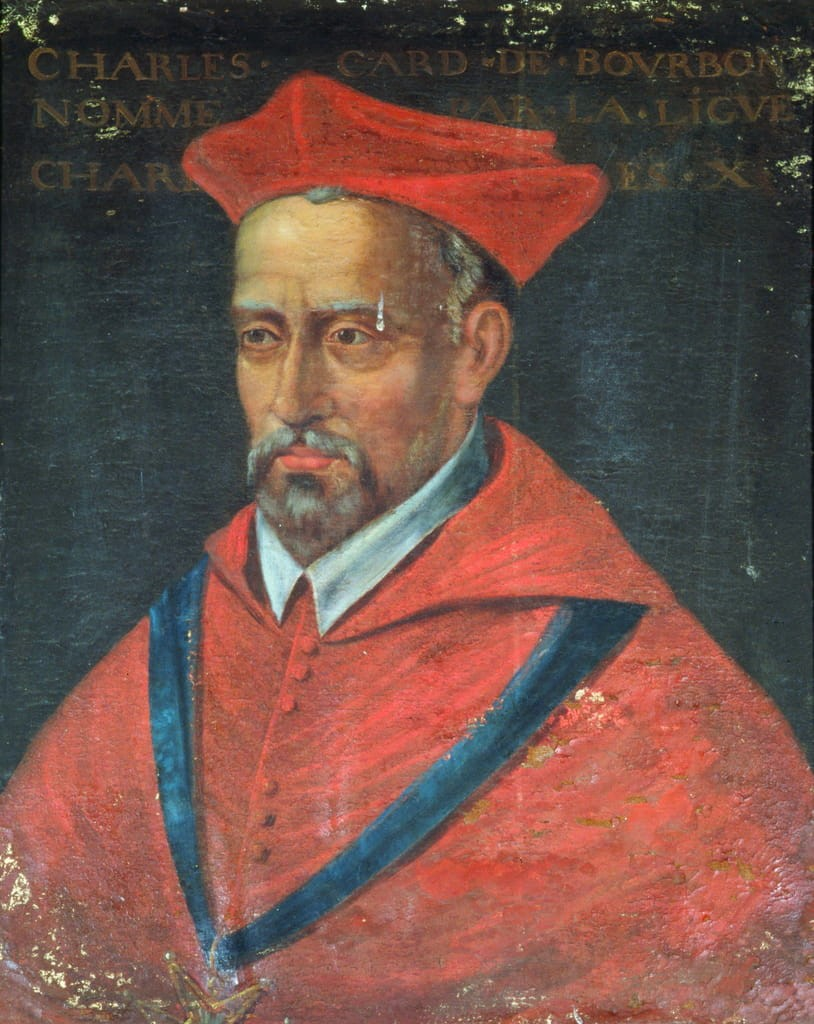
Cardinal de Bourbon who tried to get the 'Triumvirate' and Condé to leave the capital

Paris quickly became a powder keg with both the Catholic grandees and Condé present in the city. To this end, the new governor of Paris Cardinal de Bourbon asked both the 'Triumvirs' and Condé to leave the city before they came to blows in the streets. The radical Catholics of the city begged Guise and his 'Triumvir' colleagues to stay. Condé departed on 23 March 1562, heading to one of his properties. On 24 March Guise, Montmorency and Saint-André likewise left the city, heading to Fontainebleau to secure the king and Catherine.

=== Securing the royal family ===
At this moment, Catherine and therefore the king, were wavering between the two sides. For a time she was tempted to entreat with Condé through Jeanne d'Albret, with the end goal of going to Orléans with him and the king. She sent four letters to this end from Fontainebleau from 16 to 26 of March. Condé however ignored her pleas, and departed from Paris to Meaux. However this ambition became known to Montmorency and Guise, who pressured the king of Navarre into sending his wife away from Catherine on 27 March. That same day a large cavalry force composed of a 1000 horses led by the 'Triumvirs' arrived at Fontainebleau and brought the king and Catherine to Paris under 'their protection'. Protestants would denounce their move as making the royal family their prisoners.

Condé's failure to impede this effort put him in a position to either submit or formally rebel. He therefore proceeded to Orléans where he raised the standard of revolt on 2 April at the head of a force of 2000 cavalry. Over the following months many cities would rise up in favour of Condé's cause, among them Rouen, Lyon, Bourges and Grenoble.

On 4 April 1562, Montmorency returned to the capital. He led an armed force to storm one of the Protestant temples of Paris, known as 'Jerusalem'. His soldiers broke in, located and confiscated a cache of weapons they found and then sacked the building, leaving it in ashes. With Jerusalem destroyed, they moved on to the other main Protestant church of the capital and repeated the spectacle. The pulpits and other wooden items in the temples piled into great bonfires. Their actions were imitated by elements of the population on the following day, with some Catholics tearing the remaining parts of the house down and crying 'god has not forgotten the people of Paris'. His soldiers patrolled the streets, conducting house to house searches in hopes of locating Protestant preachers.

As crisis consumed the French crown in the wake of the Massacre of Wassy both Protestant and Catholic grandees began to arm. Condé lead the Protestant efforts, while Guise, Montmorency and Saint-André mobilised armies in opposition to him. Now in rebellion, Condé engaged in an acidic 'war of words' with Montmorency, Saint-André and Guise. Both sides argued that it was they who were the loyal protectors of the crown and the other who was a disobedient rebel.

Condé published a manifesto outlining the cause of his rebellion on 8 April. In the text he complained about violations of the Edict of January, the duc de Guise's culpability for the Massacre of Wassy and the existence of the 'Triumvirate' of Montmorency, Guise and Saint-André, which Condé charged engaged in illegal actions and formed a shadow government separate from the council of the king. According to Condé the association of Montmorency, Guise and Saint-André with support from Tournon and Lorraine intended nothing less than the extermination of the king's natural subjects with the aim of dividing and plundering France among themselves.

Montmorency's nephew Coligny ultimately decided to join Condé's cause. He wrote to Montmorency, rebuking him for allying with the Lorraines, arguing that he had put himself in bed with a family who desired to rule France and ruin their own houses. On 4 May, Montmorency, Guise and Saint-André petitioned the king to restore a unity of religion in the kingdom.

=== First war of religion ===
Though there was now a state of war between the Protestant grandees and the crown, both sides remained keen to negotiate. Montmorency was therefore involved in considering the Protestant demands alongside Catherine, walking with her in the gardens of the Louvre while receiving the dispatches from the secretaries, who were actually travelling to Orléans to hear Condé's demands. Condé wished for Montmorency, Guise and Saint-André to disband their forces and withdraw from court and for the Edict of January to be enforced. In response Catherine argued that it was not appropriate to send away such important grandees from court during the king's minority. Montmorency and Saint-André were more tempted by the various proposals towards peace than their Triumvir colleague once they learned how many cities were defecting to the Protestant cause. Though at times it would appear an acceptable settlement had been reached between the two sides, by late summer it had become clear that no deal could be reached.

On 19 April 1562, with Catherine now on board with the 'Triumvirs', Montmorency proposed that they make an appeal via the Papal Nuncio to the Pope, so that he might provide money and troops in support of Catholic France. Catherine was however more interested in support from Spain and the leading figures of the court would all write to Philip appealing for aid.

Now at war with the Protestants, the ascendant Catholic grandees could afford to be a little more open in their ambitions. There was conflict in their strategies however and in June 1562, Navarre was content to order the duc d'Étampes, governor of Brittany to seize any caches of Protestant arms he located. Montmorency meanwhile ordered Étampes to remove any Protestants from his governate. This contradiction in severity caused Étampes to despair.

The Protestant rebels meanwhile, entered into accord with the English on 20 September 1562, by which in return for providing Le Havre to the English on a temporary basis (until such time as they could provide Calais), the rebels were to be granted 6,000 soldiers and 100,000 crowns.

Montmorency and Guise were both present at the bombardment of the Protestant held city of Rouen. At first the command of the siege was under the authority of the lieutenant-general of the kingdom Navarre. However he received a mortal wound during the conduct of the siege, and therefore command devolved to the Constable.

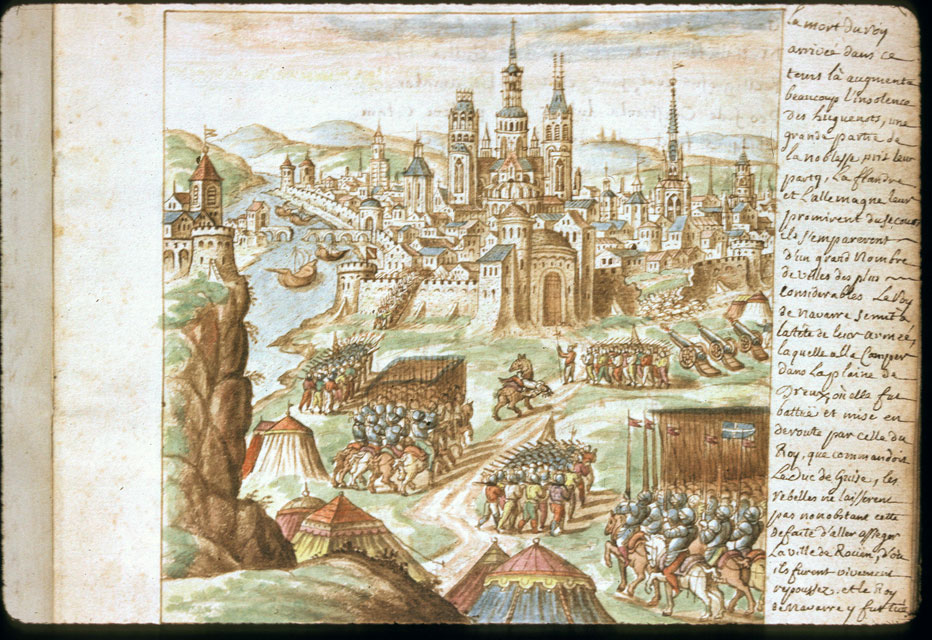
Siege of Rouen which was led by Montmorency after the fatal wounding of Navarre

With the siege of Rouen successfully brought to its conclusion, if at the loss of the lieutenant-general of the kingdom (Navarre who was fatally wounded during its progress), the royal army prepared to decamp. Therefore on 6 November 1562 Guise and Montmorency led the force from the city in the hopes of bringing the Protestant commander Condé to battle. Condé had decided in the wake of the loss of Rouen that he needed to make a bold play, and therefore advanced on the capital. As he progressed he became bogged down taking surrounding villages and towns and therefore afforded enough time for Montmorency and Guise to hurry a force to bolster the city's defences. Condé therefore turned north and marched into Normandy in the hopes that the queen of England Elizabeth could provide troops to support them. It was on his march north into Normandy that Montmorency intercepted the Protestant army at Dreux. The royal army had departed Paris on 11 December and under Montmorency's command had a strength of around 19,000 men total. However in terms of cavalry the army was inferior to Condé's, with only around 2,500 horses against the Protestants' 4,500.

The two armies marched parallel, with the superior infantry (and lower amount of cavalry) of the royal army allowing them to cross worse ground than the Protestant army.

=== Dreux and captivity ===
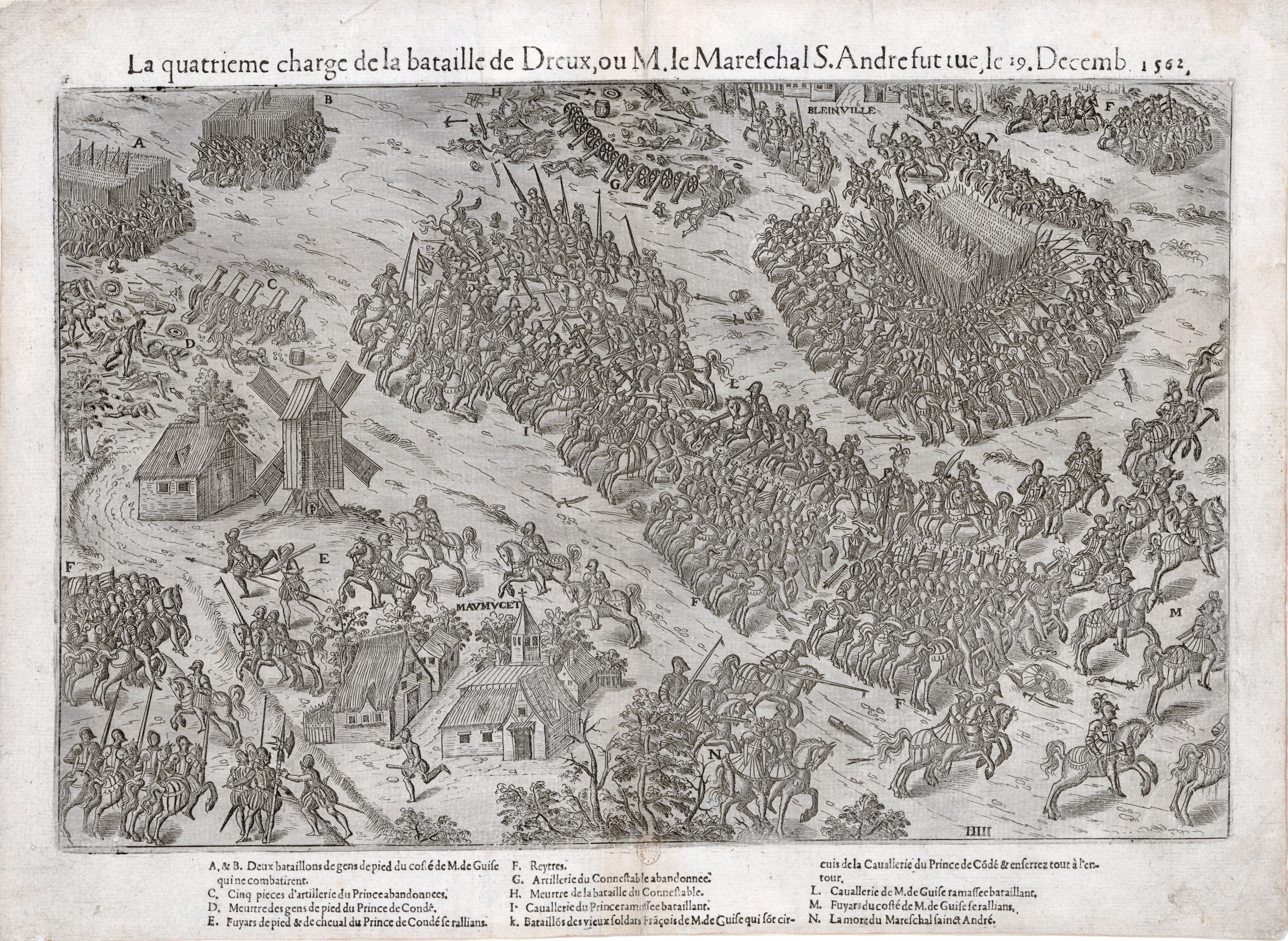
Battle of Dreux at which Montmorency was captured for the third time in his career

When it became clear that the Protestants were heading into Normandy, the possibility of intercepting the army became a realistic course of action if the royal force struck west. However at this point Montmorency, and the other 'Triuvmirs' who were with the army hesitated, unsure of the wisdom of engaging fellow Frenchmen across the battlefield. Therefore they dispatched a representative to Paris, to find out the opinion of Catherine on the course of action. The queen mother was amused that they would turn to her, and deferred to the military captains' experience. On 19 December 1562 the royal army therefore crossed the river Eure and established themselves south of Dreux. The Protestants accepted the offer of battle and the two forces prepared to fight. The royal position was strong, anchored on both sides by villages, Montmorency commanded a force of Swiss pikeman and a portion of the gendarmes constituting the left of the royal army. Montmorency's force was subject to the attacks of the first phases of the battle, the Protestants acutely aware that they were at a disadvantage in terms of artillery and therefore prioritising rash cavalry charges. Coligny's cavalry charged into the royal lines, breaking them around Montmorency, and capturing him, the Constable receiving a wound to his mouth during the fighting. With a reiter escort, Montmorency was quickly hurried off the battlefield to captivity in Orléans, where the reiters reported a great Protestant victory.

In June 1563, Montmorency received a letter from Volpert von Ders, the German cavalrymen who had taken him prisoner at Dreux. He reminded Montmorency of the courtesy with which he had been treated by Ders while in his captivity, including his not having taken Montmorency's collier de l'ordre de Saint-Michel (collar of the Order of Saint-Michel) which could have dishonoured the Constable. In return for his good treatment, Ders demanded a chain worth 500 écus, which Ders promised he would always wear as a reminder of the Constable, and further that Montmorency would ensure he remained a pensioner of the king.

In the initial rumours that spread after the battle, Montmorency's capture was not yet known, and therefore it was reported that he had been killed and the battle lost for the royalists. This was not however true, and the battle represented a victory for the royalists. Montmorency's capture was offset for the royalists by the capture of Condé in the combat, leaving Montmorency's nephew Coligny in charge of the Protestant war effort. Despite being a royal victory, Montmorency's son Montbéron was killed in the course of the combat, as was Saint-André. Guise intended to continue prosecuting the war, and set about the siege of Orléans, hoping to reduce the final Protestant held city on the Loire. However before he could bring the siege to its conclusion he was assassinated. His assassin the sieur de Méré implicated Coligny under torture as being responsible for ordering the hit, before later retracting his testimony. As a result of his death, the hands of the royalist party were freed to begin negotiations.

=== Amboise ===
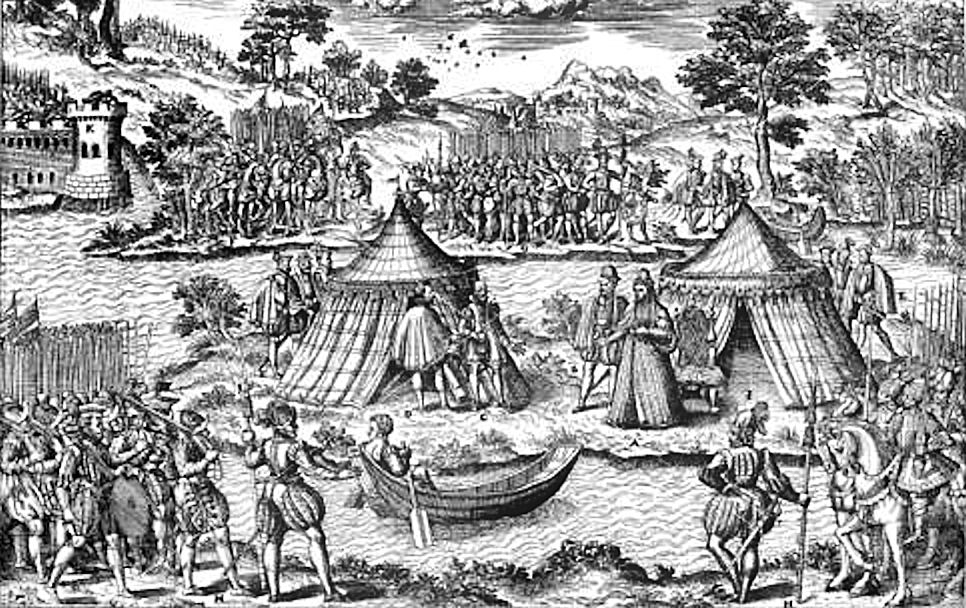
Peace of Amboise, primarily negotiated between Montmorency and Condé to bring the First War of Religion to a close

With Montmorency in Protestant captivity, and Condé in royal captivity, negotiations began between the two men to bring an end to the civil war at Catherine's instigation. They met for their negotiations at the Île aux Bœufs, which had a history of being used as a place for treaties to be signed. Alongside Montmorency for the royalist cause were Catherine, Montmorency's son Damville and the bishop of Limoges; meanwhile Condé was joined by Montmorency's nephew Andelot, Saint-Cyr, the Protestant governor of Orléans, and Jean d'Aubigné. The result of their work together was published on 19 March as the Edict of Amboise, which mandated that crimes of the past from the civil war and before be vanquished from memory, that Protestant worship only occur at certain designated sites and that associations that might be the nuclei of opposition to the peace be disbanded. In particular Protestant worship was permitted on the estates of nobility with rights of high justice, while outside of this it was allowed in towns the Protestants held prior to the outbreak of civil war and one town per baillage. This peace was greatly favourable to the Protestant nobility at the expense of the general Protestant population who could only worship inside their houses.

As a mark of the newfound peace, the royal court entered the city of Orléans which had resisted the efforts of Guise to besiege it. Montmorency, Catherine, Cardinal de Bourbon and Condé made a solemn entrance to the city on 1 April, with Condé hosting a banquet for the court as a proof of the Catholic and Protestant unity.

With peace established internally, the attentions of the crown turned to rooting out the Protestants' former ally, to whom they had ceded the town of Le Havre in return for support. Condé and Montmorency jointly led a force that succeeded in securing its reduction on 28 July 1563. In the treaty of Troyes England agreed to France's permanent possession of Calais, in return for an indemnity of around 120,000 couronnes, far less than the 500,000 outlined at Cateau-Cambrésis.

=== Feud with the Guise ===
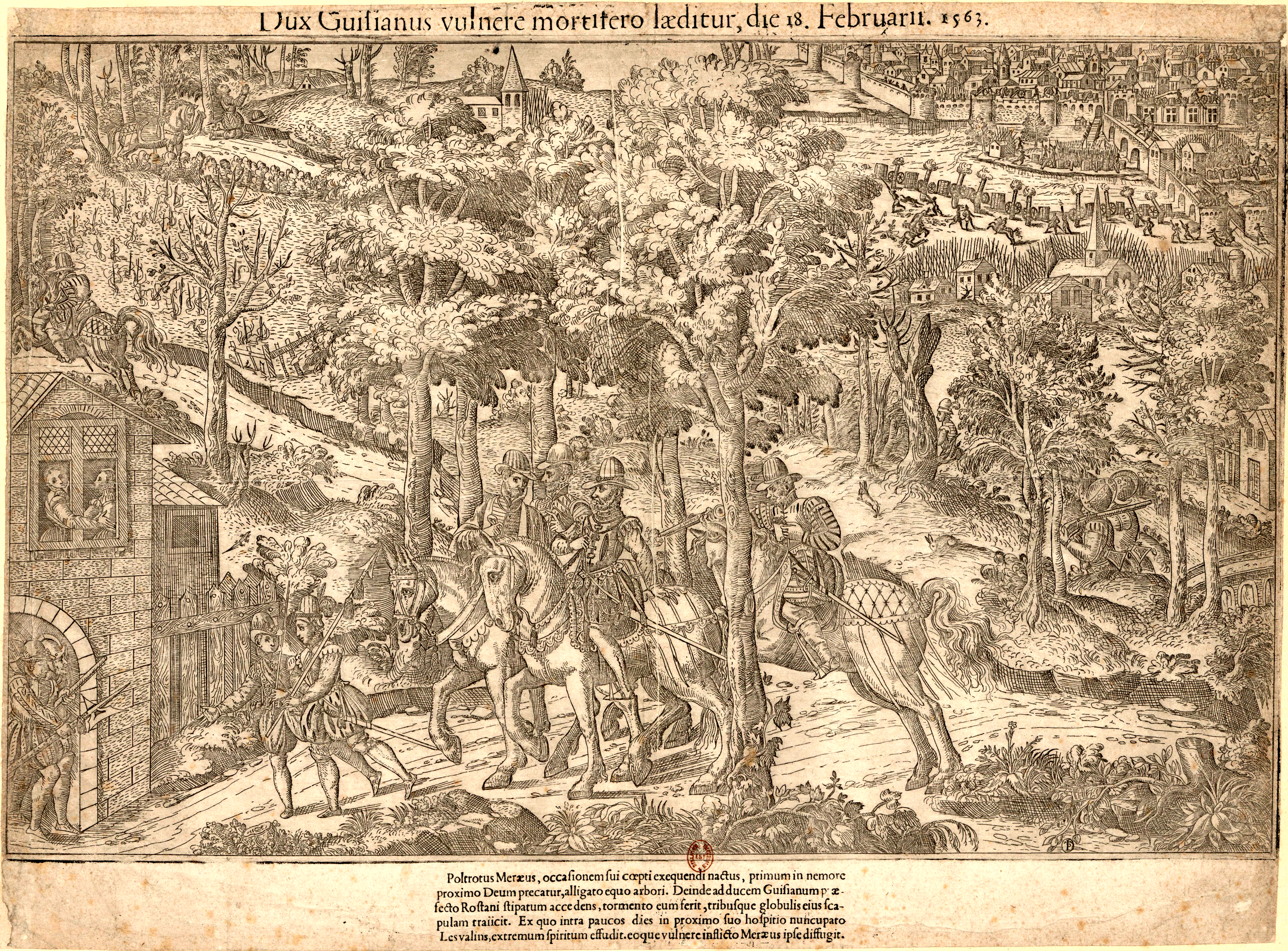
Assassination of Guise during the siege of Orléans

Montmorency's nephew Coligny was accused of involvement in the assassination of Guise by the Lorraine family. Montmorency rediscovered his familial interests and came to the defence of his nephew against the attacks of the Lorraines. Indeed the whole Montmorency family gave its backing to Coligny in the dispute, and given the death of the duc de Guise, the Lorraine family lacked the political influence to oppose them at court. In late 1563 he acted as a mediator between the two sides but was unable to achieve a reconciliation. In relation to the feud, Montmorency got into a dispute with the duc d'Aumale towards the end of 1563. In January 1564, the crown demanded an adjourning of the attempts to prosecute Coligny, a victory for Montmorency and the Châtillon in the feud.

With the war over, Montmorency took his place on the royal councils, and would be a fixture on them for the next four years until his death in 1567. During this period the council contained both radical Catholics and Protestants. By this time Montmorency's age was beginning to weight his political influence down, and his experience of captivity after Dreux had moderated his politics. He therefore did not advocate for the religious order he desired as vigorously as he had in previous years. Catherine was therefore able to express her own political program on the court more easily than she might have been able to in prior years.

Montmorency decided in 1563 to resign the charge of governor of Languedoc in favour of his second eldest son the baron de Damville. yielding the office on 12 May. The privilege of a governor to resign in favour of a chosen successor had been incredibly rare in prior generations, only occurring once between 1498 and 1547, however after that point it began to proliferate.

=== Grand tour ===
In 1564, Catherine decided that the court would conduct a grand tour of the kingdom. It was hoped that this would bring noble support back to the king after the destructions and disunity of the civil war, and pressure obedience to the Edict of Amboise from the regional Parlements. Before departing on this tour a great number of festivities were conducted at Fontainebleau, with mock battles, theatre, and tournaments. In these events Montmorency and the Cardinal de Bourbon presided over the festivities. As part of their responsibilities to preside over the events, they both hosted suppers for the various grandees in their lodgings.

Route of the Grand Tour of the Kingdom

As the royal tour began in March of that year, Montmorency was among those who accompanied the court in motion, alongside Bourbon, the young new king of Navarre and Condé. Montmorency indeed had the most important responsibility of the tour, as it was his duty to maintain discipline in the large moving court, gave orders to the local town governors that they passed by and rode ahead of the main force to ensure everything was ready to receive the king. Over the course of their travels the court would conduct three lit de justice (bed of justice) to bring the Parlements of Dijon, Bordeaux and Toulouse into line. Approaching Lyon, Montmorency ensured that a royal garrison was installed in the various fortifications before the king approached. At La Rochelle the port city had prepared a silk ribbon across the porte de Cougnes, and informed the royal party that it was tradition for the king to cut it before entering their city. Montmorency found little amusing in the tradition, and slashed through the ribbon with his sword, inquiring of the city grandees whether it was their plan to stop the king entering La Rochelle.

As the tour continued, Montmorency had a chance to place his clients in positions of authority. In Dauphiné, the lieutenant-general of the province who was loyal to the duc de Guise, Maugiron was replaced by the baron de Gordes who was a client of Montmorency, and the lieutenant of his personal company.

While the court was absent from the capital on the tour, the crisis between the Montmorency and Lorraine families almost exploded in a showdown in Paris. In January of 1565, the Cardinal de Lorraine attempted to enter Paris under arms, and was resisted on his entry by Montmorency's eldest son, the governor of Paris. François de Montmorency was even more intense in his hatred of the Lorraine family than his father, but coupled his hatred with a genuine moderate attitude towards Protestantism. Lorraine was supported in this attempted show of force against the capital by the Protestant leader Condé who was nursing resentments against Montmorency at this time. The showdown was an embarrassment for the Lorraines who came out the worse in a skirmish at the gates of the city and were forced to take shelter in one of the family's houses. Though civil war between the two families was avoided, the confrontation left lingering resentments.

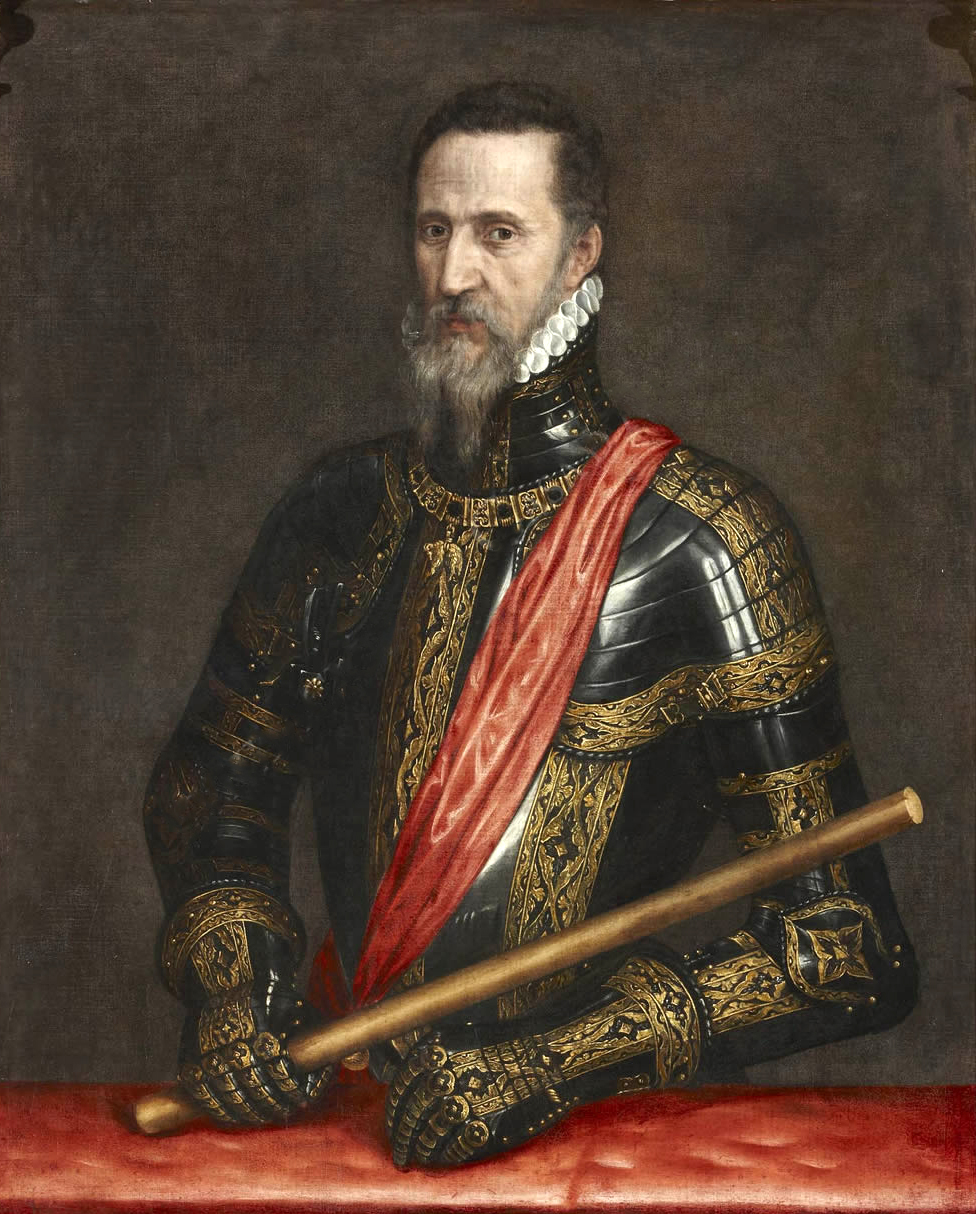
Duke of Alba who would cause such fear among the French Protestant nobles for his persecution of Dutch Protestants

At Bayonne in June 1565, the court met up with the duke of Alba representing the Spanish king Philip II. In a grand council on 30 June, Montmorency made an argument in favour of the toleration policy the crown was following, arguing it on the grounds that the alternative was civil war, which could present great dangers to the crown.

When the court arrived at Blois it was joined by Navarre's mother the queen of Navarre, Coligny and Lorraine. The court then proceeded to Moullins where Catherine engineered a reconciliation in the Montmorency-Lorraine feud. On 27 January 1566 Coligny was declared to be innocent of any involvement in the assassination of the duc. Montmorency was compelled to reconcile with Lorraine, while Coligny was to reconcile with the Guise. Oaths were exchanged that the participants would not attempt to harm each other. The young duc de Guise himself was not present at these exchanges, and when he did arrive at court in February, Montmorency departed in anger, which demonstrated the accords to be somewhat hollow. With this at least nominally accomplished, the court took two final steps on their tour before re-entering the capital on 1 May 1566.

Around this time, as a reward for his loyal service to the crown, Montmorency received the elevation of his second son, Damville to the Marshalate. Alba was unimpressed by the high favour Montmorency was in, and reported it back disapprovingly to Philip II.

The rivalry between the Montmorency and Lorraine families placed Catholic nobles in the south west in a difficult position, as for example Cardinal d'Armagnac who had to balance his responsibilities as a subordinate to Montmorency in Languedoc, with his ties of clientage to the Cardinal of Lorraine. As a result many of these men withdrew from their affiliation with grandees entirely.

Despite his long record of anti-Protestantism, Montmorency was not excluded from the paranoid fears of some Catholics reported by Claude Haton, who observed that many felt the king, queen mother, and Constable were all secret Protestants, as that could be the only explanation for the peace they had established and were enforcing across France.

=== Surprise of Meaux ===
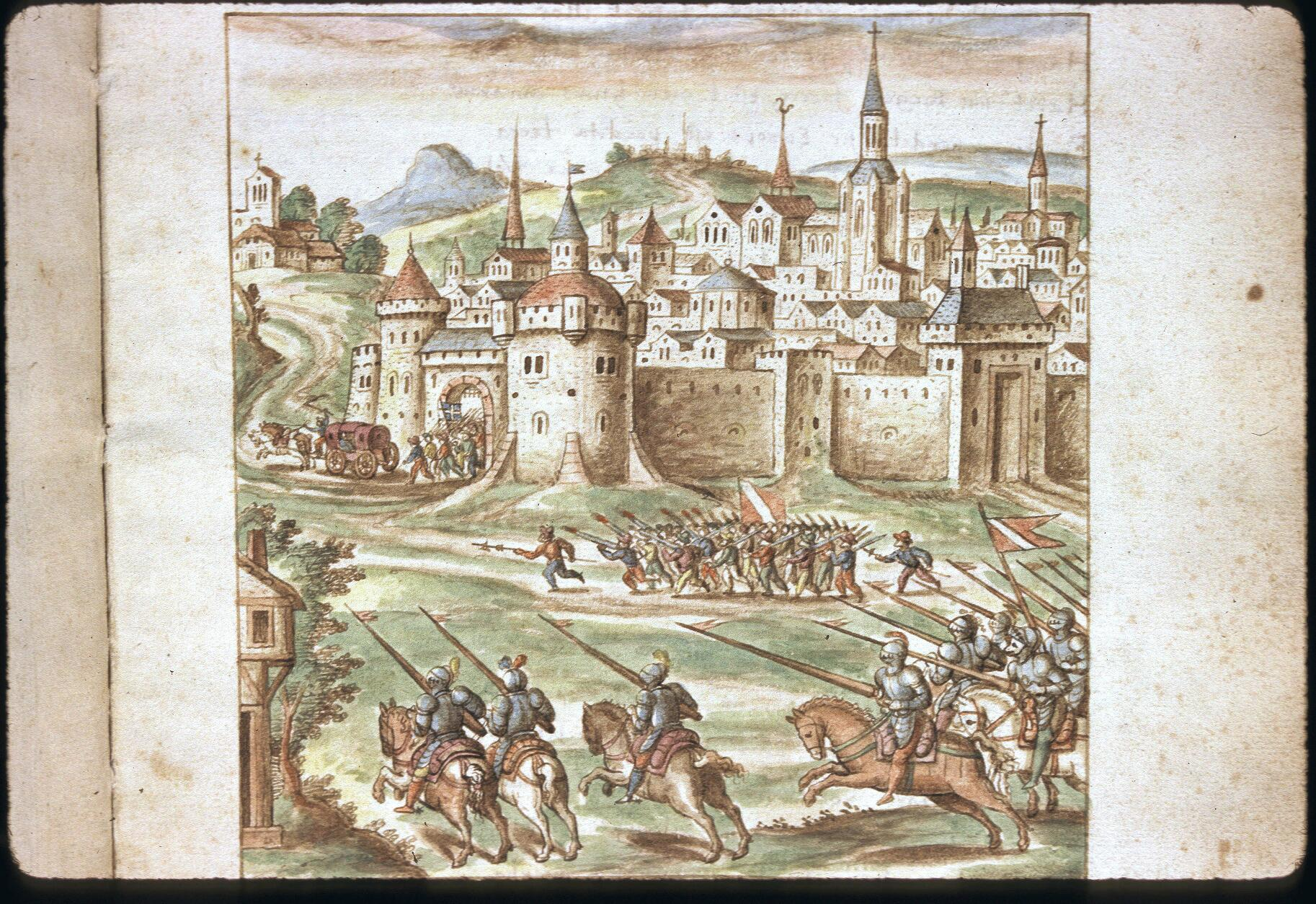
Surprise of Meaux at which Montmorency and the royal court was attacked in a coup by a force of Protestant cavalry

Protestant suspicions of the peace were furthered in this period of peace by the various modifications made to the terms of the Peace of Amboise. Montmorency, Morvillier and the secretary of state L'Aubespine were suspected of pushing Catherine in a more pro-Catholic direction. Further discord between Protestant and Catholic nobles was created by the hiring of Swiss mercenaries by the crown to protect the realm against any potential moves by the passing army under the duke of Alba which was heading to the Netherlands. In exasperation, Montmorency said to the Protestant nobles at court "The Swiss have their pay; don't you expect them to be used?".

At this time Condé renewed his efforts to compete with Montmorency for supreme command of the French army, but was unsuccessful, his campaign however damaged the relationship between the Bourbon and Montmorency families. Furious at being spurned for the office of lieutenant-general, Condé left court, and was soon joined by Montmorency's nephew Andelot who was similarly resentful in his dispute with Marshal Cossé (formerly known as the seigneur de Gonnor) over the office of colonel-general of the infantry. Coligny likewise departed court. They agreed to conduct a coup attempt in line with that of Amboise in 1560, assembling a large cavalry force at Meaux to kidnap the royal family and take charge of the religious direction of the kingdom from the Lorraine. The court was alerted to the plot while staying at Monceaux and were faced with two choices of how to proceed. Montmorency and the chancellor L'Hôpital favoured holding their ground against any attacks, meanwhile the Lorraine family and duc de Nemours favoured making a retreat to the safety of Paris. The Swiss guard that was with the group confidently asserted that they could provide the appropriate protection for a retreat to the capital. Therefore it was the latter course of action that was agreed on, and they conducted a fighting retreat towards the capital. Montmorency and the king's Swiss guard held back the Protestant cavalry while the king and Catherine made for Paris.

=== Second war of religion ===
With their coup at Meaux a failure, the Protestant leadership decided to besiege the king in Paris. Montmorency organised the royal defence in the capital, and called upon Strozzi to bring his infantry from Picardy, and comte de Brissac to bring forces up from Lyon, such that he could assemble an army able to break the Protestant hold on the capital. As he worked towards building his military force, negotiations flowed back and forth across the siege lines. The Protestants initially demanded Nemours and the Lorraines be excluded from royal council, Catherine to retire from politics and an Estates General be called. On 7 October 1556, the crown presented their counter-offer, Condé and Coligny were to present themselves before the king and admit their rebellion. This damaged the Protestant confidence, and Condé's next demands were for the Edict of Amboise to be applied without any worship restrictions. These negotiations were conducted face to face on 10 October, Montmorency and an armed escort, his eldest son Marshal Montmorency, Marshal Cossé meeting with Montmorency's three nephews and La Rochefoucauld. During the course of their discussions Montmorency got into a bitter argument with his nephew Cardinal de Châtillon. The religious concessions the princes wanted were intolerable to Montmorency who did not want a religiously divided realm, and therefore the talks collapsed. For Condé the edicts established by the king should be unalterable, while Montmorency believed the crown had the power to modify their edicts as they pleased.

Inside the city the situation was tense and religiously explosive. The city was low on food, even without the besieging army, as the area had not yet recovered from a scarcity which had dominated the last few years. Therefore, when Charenton, a key point in the city's grain supply fell to the Protestants during the siege, the populations blamed the leaders of the defence effort, Montmorency and his son François, for the surrender of the garrison. It was even alleged that Montmorency's son had engineered the garrisons surrender intentionally. With the capital increasingly against him, Montmorency at first stepped up the efforts to conduct sorties, which reduced the stranglehold on the Parisian food supply. He then took the offensive. He was aided in this more forward posture by Condé's overconfidence. The Protestant commander had peeled off part of the besieging army, under the command of Montmorency's nephew Andelot to guard the north east approaches to the capital from any reinforcements that might arrive for Montmorency.

=== Saint-Denis ===
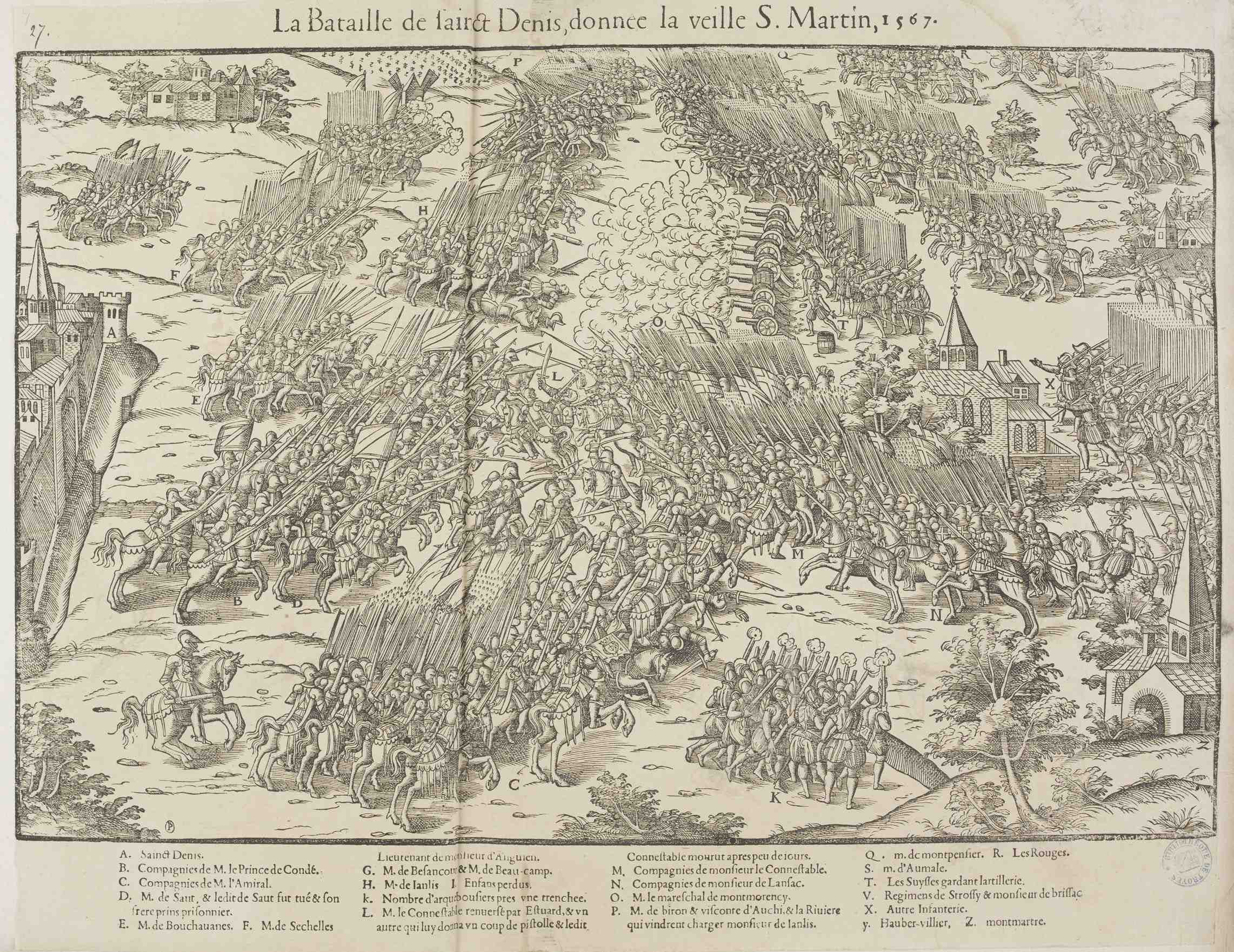
Fatal wounding of the Constable at the battle of Saint-Denis, he is brought down at the letter L on the image

Montmorency engaged the besieging army outside Paris at the Battle of Saint-Denis on 10 November 1567. By this time he had assembled an army that totalled around 25,000 men, both various experienced Swiss forces brought to the capital and a contingent of inexperienced Parisians brought to arms for the sole purpose of the emergency, and boasted 14 artillery pieces. The Swiss under the command of Pfyffer constituted around 6,000 men, while the foot-soldiers were commanded by Brissac and Strozzi. The Protestant army was only around 5,000 strong, led by Coligny and Condé.

=== Death ===
Royal cavalry under Marshal Cossé and Marshal Biron attempted to charge the entrenched Protestant positions but were repulsed. Ultimately however they succeeded in smashing Condé's centre, composed of only a thin line of arquebusiers while Condé's cavalry ripped the royal wings apart. With Montmorency's forces pierced by Condé the Constable became surrounded and was wounded repeatedly on both his face and on his head, his surrender was therefore demanded. Montmorency, already thrice made prisoner during his career refused, and was shot in the kidney and neck by a man named Robert Stuart. His sons succeeded in breaking through to him, and were able to extract Montmorency from the field. He was taken to his Parisian hôtel on the rue Sainte-Avoye where he convalesced for two days before dying on 12 November 1567.

Montmorency's eldest son Marshal Montmorency therefore led the cavalry of the royal army against the Protestants, it having been galvanised by the wounding of the Constable. In the end the superior numbers of the royal army prevailed and allowed for a victory, with more Protestant casualties than royal. However, the Protestant force was able to disengage in good order and broke off from Paris to seek a rendezvous with their German mercenary allies.

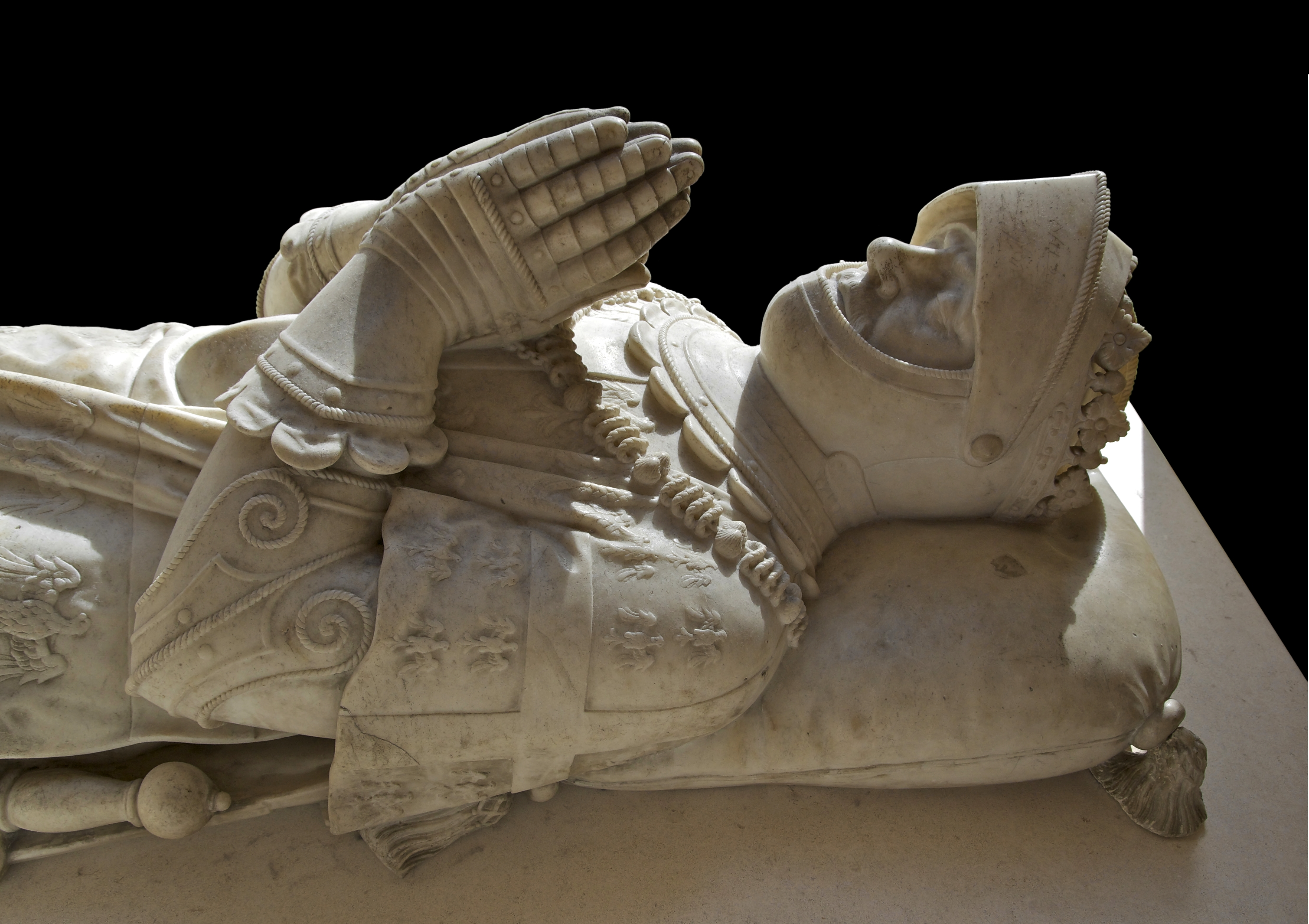
Gisant of Montmorency, now stored at the Louvre

The king's preacher Arnauld Sorbin spoke at Montmorency's funeral, as he would later do at the funeral of king himself, thereby making Montmorency's funeral royal. Sorbin held the important role of leading the prayers at the service. The royal parallels were accentuated by the route of the cortège which travelled to Saint-Denis and buried his coffin at the foot of Henri II's. An effigy of the Constable (which even included the face wounds he had received at Saint-Denis) was created as part of the ceremonies and displayed in Notre-Dame de Paris on 25 November 1567. Similar effigies were to be created for the king's brother the duc d'Alençon in 1584 and Henri III's deceased favourite Joyeuse in 1587.

So close were Henri and Montmorency, that the king had expressed his desire for both of their hearts to be stored together in an urn in the king's Germain Pilon created funerary monument.

=== Legacy ===
The office of Constable would not be transferred, and the highest military office in the kingdom would become lieutenant-general, which was given to the king's eldest brother the duc d'Anjou on the day of Montmorency's death. The crown hoped that by this means important military control would remain in the hands of the royal family as opposed to grandees such as Condé. This was a disappointment to both Aumale and Montmorency's eldest son, both of whom had seen the possibility that they might become Constable. The dispute between Anjou and Condé over who would succeed Montmorency as head of the French military left much hatred between the two men.

A few years later, the murderer of the Constable, Stuart would be captured at the Battle of Jarnac by an army led by Anjou. Anjou handed Stuart over to the marquis de Villars, a brother in law of Montmorency. Villars took Stuart a little distance away from the camp, and killed him in cold blood.

== Reputation ==
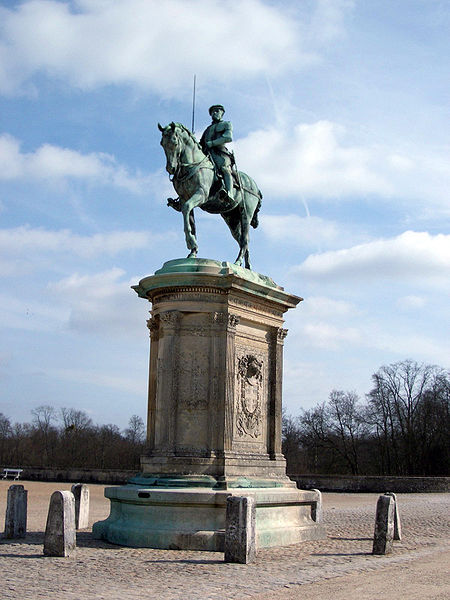
Equestrian statue of Montmorency at the Château de Chantilly

Montmorency's military reputation would ultimately be mixed. In his career he lost more battles than he won. A contemporary Venetian opined that Montmorency could not match the calibre of the duc de Guise's military skill. The Venetian ambassador nevertheless conceded that he was a 'courageous soldier' The duc de Nevers held Montmorency's political skill in high regard, and would later advise Henri III to imitate Montmorency's prudence and strategic behaviour. The ligueur (leaguer) archbishop of Lyon would advise the third duc de Guise to look to Montmorency as a model for dominating the court in 1588. Other contemporaries variously described Montmorency's domestic behaviour as 'arrogant', 'overbearing' 'of good understanding' and 'well experienced'. The historian Sutherland described Montmorency's approach to government as 'autocratic'.

Many contemporaries described him as the first true favourite in French history, by which it was meant a man whose fortune was based on his access to royal favour, as opposed to his control of a particularly powerful feudatory network. Brantôme contrasts his 'military valour' and 'excellence' with the favourites of Charles IX and Henri III, who were by contrast unworthy of the great benefits they received in Brantôme's estimation. Le Roux observes that many of the families who would provide favourites in the reign of Henri III, such as the Joyeuse, La Guiche and Saint-Sulpice, owed their accession to noteworthiness to the protection of the Montmorency family and the Constable.

== Sources ==
- Babelon, Jean-Pierre (2009). Henri IV. Fayard.
- Baumgartner, Frederic (1986). Change and Continuity in the French Episcopate: The Bishops and the Wars of Religion 1547-1610.
- Baumgartner, Frederic (1988). Henry II: King of France 1547–1559. Duke University Press.
- Benedict, Philip (2003). Rouen during the Wars of Religion. Cambridge University Press.
- Boltanski, Ariane (2006). Les ducs de Nevers et l'État royal: genèse d'un compromis (ca 1550 - ca 1600). Librairie Droz.
- Bourquin, Laurent (1994). Noblesse Seconde et Pouvoir en Champagne aux xvi et xvii siècles. Publications de la Sorbonne.
- Carroll, Stuart (2005). Noble Power during the French Wars of Religion: The Guise Affinity and Catholic Cause in Normandy. Cambridge University Press.
- Carroll, Stuart (2011). Martyrs and Murderers: The Guise Family and the Making of Europe. Oxford University Press.
- Chevallier, Pierre (1985). Henri III: Roi Shakespearien. Fayard.
- Cloulas, Ivan (1979). Catherine de Médicis. Fayard.
- Cloulas, Ivan (1985). Henri II. Fayard.
- Constant, Jean-Marie (1984). Les Guise. Hachette.
- Croix, Alain (1993). L'Âge d'Or de la Bretagne 1532-1675. Éditions Ouest-France.
- Diefendorf, Barbara (1991). Beneath the Cross: Catholics and Huguenots in Sixteenth Century Paris. Oxford University Press.
- Doran, J. (July 4, 1857). "Anne a Male Name". Notes and Queries. 2. 4 (79): 12.
- Durot, Éric (2012). François de Lorraine, duc de Guise entre Dieu et le Roi. Classiques Garnier. ISBN 9782812406102.
- Gould, Kevin (2016). Catholic Activism in South-West France 1540-1570. Routledge.
- Harding, Robert (1978). Anatomy of a Power Elite: the Provincial Governors in Early Modern France. Yale University Press.
- Holt, Mack (2002). The Duke of Anjou and the Politique Struggle During the Wars of Religion. Cambridge University Press.
- Holt, Mack P. (2005). The French Wars of Religion, 1562-1629. Cambridge University Press.
- Jouanna, Arlette (1989). Le Devoir de révolte: La noblesse française et la gestation de l'Etat moderne 1559-1661. Fayard.
- Jouanna, Arlette (1998). Histoire et Dictionnaire des Guerres de Religion. Bouquins.
- Knecht, Robert (1994). Renaissance Warrior and Patron: The Reign of Francis I. Cambridge University Press.
- Knecht, Robert (2010). The French Wars of Religion, 1559-1598. Routledge.
- Knecht, Robert (2014). Catherine de' Medici. Routledge.
- Knecht, Robert (2016). Hero or Tyrant? Henry III, King of France, 1574-1589. Routledge.
- Le Roux, Nicolas (2000). La Faveur du Roi: Mignons et Courtisans au Temps des Derniers Valois. Champ Vallon.
- Le Roux, Nicolas (2020). Portraits d'un Royaume: Henri III, la Noblesse et la Ligue. Passés Composés.
- Le Roux, Nicolas (2022). 1559-1629 Les Guerres de Religion. Gallimard.
- Rentet, Thierry (2011). "Anne de Montmorency (1493-1567), Le Conseiller Médiocre". In Michon, Cédric (ed.). Les Conseillers de François Ier. Presses Universitaires de Rennes.
- Pitts, Vincent (2012). Henri IV of France: His Reign and Age. Johns Hopkins University Press.
- Potter, David (1993). War and Government in the French Provinces: Picardy 1470-1560. Cambridge University Press.
- Potter, David (1995). A History of France, 1460-1560. St. Martin's Press.
- Robbins, Kevin (1997). City on the Ocean Sea: La Rochelle, 1530-1650 Urban Society, Religion and Politics on the French Atlantic Frontier. Brill.
- Roberts, Penny (2013). Peace and Authority during the French Religious Wars c.1560-1600. Palgrave Macmillan.
- Roelker, Nancy (1968). Queen of Navarre: Jeanne d'Albret 1528-1572. Harvard University Press.
- Roelker, Nancy (1996). One King, One Faith: The Parlement of Paris and the Religious Reformation of the Sixteenth Century. University of California Press.
- Salmon, J.H.M. (1979). Society in Crisis: France in the Sixteenth Century. Metheun & Co. ISBN 0416730507.
- Sauzet, Robert (1992). Henri III et Son Temps. Librarie Philosophique J. Vrin.
- Shaw, Christine (2019). The Italian Wars 1494-1559: War, State and Society in Early Modern Europe. Routledge.
- Shimizu, J. (1970). Conflict of Loyalties: Politics and Religion in the Career of Gaspard de Coligny, Admiral of France, 1519–1572. Geneva: Librairie Droz.
- Sutherland, Nicola (1962). The French Secretaries of State in the Age of Catherine de Medici. The Athlone Press.
- Sutherland, Nicola (1980). The Huguenot Struggle for Recognition. Yale University Press.
- Thompson, James (1909). The Wars of Religion in France 1559-1576: The Huguenots, Catherine de Medici and Philip II. Chicago University Press.
- Tucker, Stephen (2014). "Montmorency, Anne, Duke of, (1493-1567)". In Tucker, Stephen (ed.). 500 Great Military Leaders. Vol. 2. ABC-CLIO.
- Ward, A.W.; Prothero, G.W.; Leathes, Stanley, eds. (1911). The Cambridge Modern History. Vol. XIII. Cambridge University Press.
- Wood, James (2002). The Kings Army: Warfare, Soldiers and Society during the Wars of Religion in France, 1562-1576. Cambridge University Press.

Anne de Montmorency, 1st Duke of Montmorency Montmorency family Born: 25 March 1493 Died: 12 November 1567
Preceded by elevated from Barony	Duc de Montmorency; 1551–1567	Succeeded by Francois
