= First French War of Religion in the provinces =

The major cities seized by the Protestant rebels during the First French War of Religion

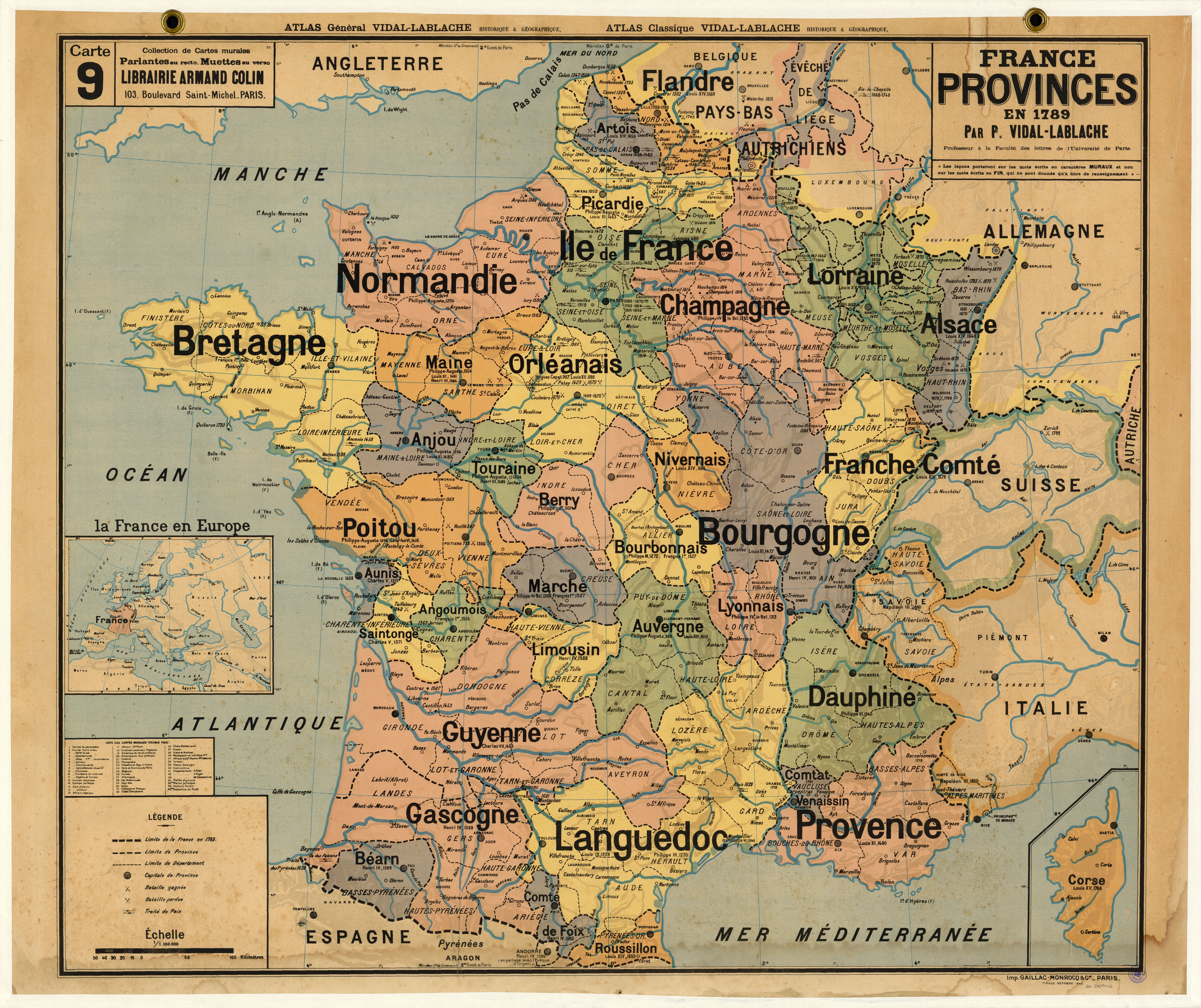
The Provinces of France in 1789, the territories of Alsace, Lorraine, Artois, Flandre, Corse and the Franche-Comté were not part of France in 1562, the French territories of the 'Trois Évêches' reside in the province of Lorraine

Across France Protestants responded to Condé's manifesto and the beginning of the first French War of Religion by seizing cities and taking control of territories. In total around 20 of the 60 largest cities in the kingdom would fall under rebel Protestant control. Among them Lyon, Tours, Amboise, Poitiers, Caen, Bayeux, Dieppe, Blois, Valence, Rouen, Angers, Le Havre, Grenoble, Auxerre, Beaugency, Montpellier, Mâcon and Le Mans. In the areas of Protestant domination iconoclasm and the seizure of churches was often undertaken. Protestant armies attempted to seize more cities that had not fallen to them. Among the leading Protestant commanders were the comte de Crussol (count of Crussol) who assumed a position of leadership in Languedoc and Dauphiné; the baron des Adrets in Dauphiné, the seigneur de Duras (lord of Duras) in Guyenne; the prince de Porcien in Champagne and the comte de Montgommery in Normandy.

This decentralised uprising would not be unopposed, and after initially being caught off guard by the sudden and dramatic nature of the conquests, local Catholic royalist commanders would begin to recapture the territories in their provinces. This included figures such as the seigneur de Monluc in Guyenne and Languedoc, the vicomte de Joyeuse (viscount of Joyeuse) in Languedoc; the comte de Sommerive in Provence; the duc d'Aumale in Normandy and the duc d'Ėtampes in Normandy. This would involve street battles to stop attempted Protestant seizures of cities (as in Toulouse and Bordeaux), the reduction of Protestant held cities (as with Poitiers and Rouen) and field battles (as in the defeat of the Protestant army of Duras by Monluc's army at Vergt in October.

By the end of 1562 the rebel Protestant presence in much of France had been successfully neutralised. However, in Languedoc and Dauphiné they remained entrenched under Crussol's leadership. Meanwhile Admiral Coligny oversaw the resurgence of their cause in Normandy shortly before the end of the war.

== Picardy ==
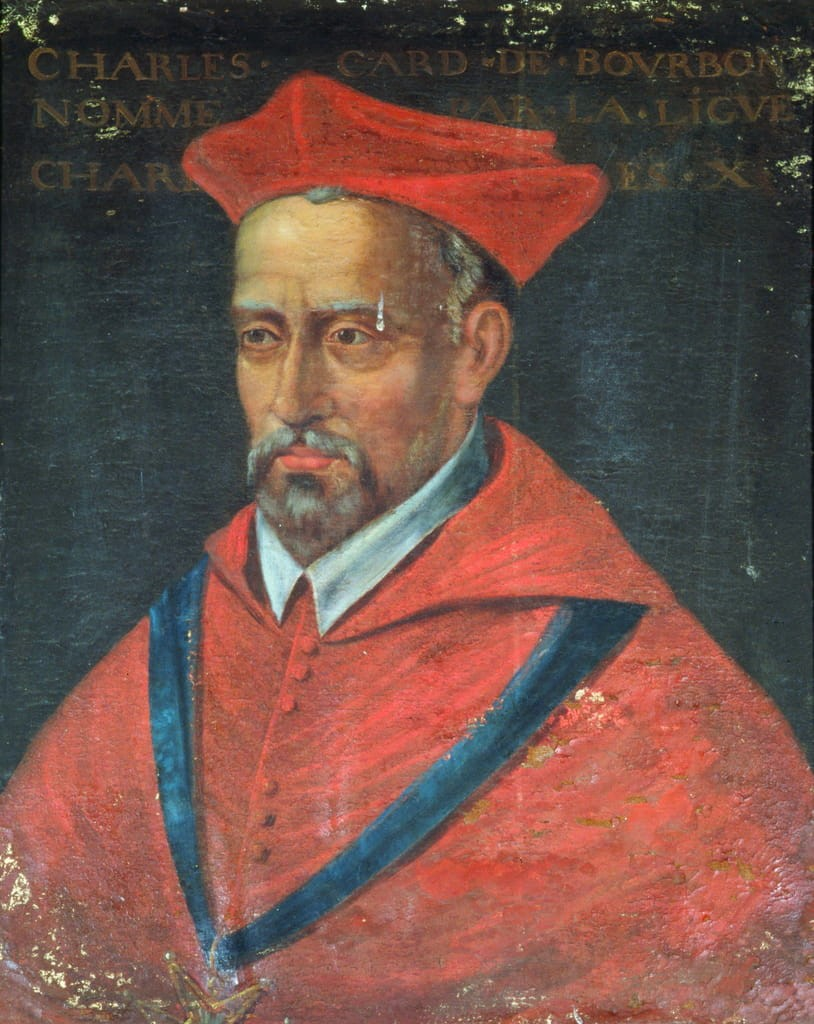
Cardinal de Bourbon, the crown's replacement for the prince de Condé as governor of Picardy

The court moved to assure itself of its control over Picardy and its capital Amiens with the province’s governor in rebellion. Under the legal fiction that Condé was a prisoner of the rebels in Orléans, his brother the cardinal de Bourbon was made governor of Picardy in his stead. Bourbon entered Amiens on 27 July.

=== Amiens ===
The Protestants had enjoyed great success in assuming influence in Amiens, and by 1562, seventeen of the twenty-four échevins (aldermen) were Protestant. During the ascension day procession, the échevins ensured it would be four of their number who carried the important châsse de Saint-Firmin (shrine of Saint-Firmin). A Protestant served as one of the city’s schoolmasters. The remaining Catholic échevins were not willing to allow the Protestant success in the city to continue, and both the mayor and the prévôt (provost) were accused by them of being partisans of the Protestants as far as overseeing the prosecutions of the disorders of 7 and 8 December were concerned. It was further implied by the Catholics that they intended to launch a Protestant coup.

The Protestants of Amiens looked to the Protestant lieutenant-general of Picardy, the sieur de Sénarpont and Condé to defend their interests at court. Condé assures them of his protection and for the moment this proved more decisive than the coalition around the bishop of Amiens (which included the bishop of Nantes and Montmorency). Another appeal to the court by the radical Catholic faction was launched on 23 April with the dean of the local chapter travelling to court to get the keys removed from those who currently possess them as 'most of them were Protestants'. Those who travelled to the court highlighted the recent Protestant seizure of Rouen. The court was more sympathetic this time, Condé no longer present to represent the Protestant interests. On 5 May, the mayor and prévôt were replaced by the court, with the latter departing to join Condé in rebellion at Orléans. Within another month, Catherine appointed ten new échevins, all Catholic, giving the Catholics a municipal majority. This new Catholic majority quickly moves to neutralise their Protestant colleagues. The cardinal de Saint-Tryphon visited the city on 22 May to announce that it was the king's will that Protestant worship be proscribed in Amiens and other border cities. The Catholic échevins happily announced the expulsion of Protestant ministers in response. During July the abjuration of all Protestants in Amiens was decreed, with some who refused to abjure choosing instead to leave the city. In the municipal elections of October a last minute addition to the electoral rules made Protestants ineligible from participating.

=== Montdidier ===
The royalist recapture of Montdidier was undertaken by deception. Having promised that the Protestants of the city would be safeguarded, the royalist force butchered and expelled them.

=== Calais ===
In May, the lieutenant-general of Picardy the sieur de Sénarpont made an abortive attempt to capture Calais.

== Champagne ==
=== Troyes ===
Condé reached out to his nephew (who happened to also be in the capital when word of Wassy arrived), the Protestant - or at least Protestant sympathetic - governor of Champagne the duc de Nevers to source military and financial aid for the cause. Nevers had received the charge of governor of Champagne from his father in 1561, the latter having resigned it to him. Nevers passed the request he received on to the Protestant church of Troyes which was already in the process of arming its members.

In Troyes, close to Wassy, tensions were escalating severely between Protestants and Catholics with both accusing each other of interfering with the electoral process in the city. On 6 April, a representative of the duc de Guise, Esclavolles, passed through Troyes. He decided to preside over the election of the échevins which had been delayed, and excluded Protestants from the process. He further took charge in Troyes and demanded the keys. On 10 April he declared only Catholics would guard the gates. The Protestants dispatched a representative to Nevers to warn him that his authority was being usurped. On 12 April, Protestants seized two of the city gates, assaulting the gate keepers. Though there was bloodshed, it was rather bloodless in comparison to cities such as Toulouse. A captain on the way to join Condé passed through Troyes, and reported back from Orléans to the Protestants that Condé desired them to obey Nevers. Nevers arrived near Troyes on 19 April, with the intention of calming religious tensions in the city. He was aware that the Protestant community of Troyes had armed and wished to keep the situation under control. He wrote to the court that agitators from outside the town were attempting to escalate the situation. He was eventually able to persuade the Protestants of Troyes to stand down by promising to protect them. Nevers, now corresponding with the crown, adopted a posture of neutrality. Both religions were to guard the gates, and weapons were to be yielded to him. He hoped this would dispel fears of a new massacre of Wassy. However many Protestants refused to hand over their weapons and instead hid them. Protestant troops that had been raised initially at Nevers' request, slipped out of the city to join with Condé on 5 May. Nevers moved to have those who did not live in Troyes expelled from the city. Nevers was frustrated with the Protestant congregation of Troyes for their having sent troops to join with the Protestant rebels. He preferred the company of the Protestant bishop of Troyes Antonio Carraciolo to his co-religionists in the city.

In July, the Protestant prince de Porcien was in the area, and threatened an attack against Troyes, though it did not materialise. Fearful of a plague, Nevers retired from Troyes, leaving his more firmly Catholic subordinate des Bordes in charge. Nevers turned his attention to the nearby settlement of Châlons, where he had heard rumours of religious disorder. He was assured by the city council that while a Protestant preacher had been causing problems, the situation was now under control. In August repression against the local Protestant population began in Troyes.

On 24 August, des Bordes led an assault against the Protestant held town of Bar-sur-Seine. The Protestant cavalry guarding the town fled, and des Bordes oversaw a massacre of 140 Protestant inhabitants. Nevers' gendarme company participated in the killings, and according to Carroll the attack could not have happened without his approval. For Nevers, this was a military action against rebels, and therefore justified. According to the local contemporary historian Nicolas Pithou they tore out the heart of one of the Protestants and then took turns biting it. Those who survived were brought back to Troyes for trial, and then executed.

Bar-sur-Seine once more fell to Protestant forces in January 1563, this prompted a new round of persecutions and killing in Troyes.

=== Sens ===
When the Protestants of Sens initially began pushing to receive churches, the mayor refused on the ground that the edict of Saint-Germain had not been registered. After it was registered he altered course to insisting the preachers of Sens speak out against the edict. On 29 March while returning to Courtenay from Sens where they had held a service a group of Protestants were attacked by Catholic boatmen. Local Protestant gentleman quickly intervened to protect them, but services were nevertheless suspended for the time being.

Before taking action, the Protestants looked to Nevers for leadership, but none came. While they stalled, the royalist Catholics of the city took the initiative. A militia was established (financed by the clergy), the gates secured and the artillery seized. A meeting was held among the Catholic grandees of Sens to decide how to proceed. It was decided to raze the Protestant church in Sens, on the day of the pilgrimage for St Savinien, when their numbers would be able to overpower the Protestants strong representation among the magistracy of the city. On the day the Catholic militia stood guard as the people of Sens tore down the church. Arrests of the Protestant leadership then began, and though chaotic did not descend into bloodshed in the morning. In the afternoon the Protestant captain returned and began preparing for a counter offensive, uniting with a band of co-religionists in a fortified house and then bursting out to attempt to push the Catholics back out of the neighbourhood. The captain attempted to make contact with a gendarmerie company of Coligny's. The Catholics brought up artillery and the captain was killed, with his unit dispersed. The general massacre then began. Canons invited peasants from the surrounding countryside into Sens to participate in the killing. According to the Protestants, 52 houses were pillaged and around 100 killed. Not all the killed were Protestants, with one Catholic magistrate being killed as he left mass. The parlement would investigate the incident but did not find anyone guilty.

=== Reims ===
In Reims, there was relatively little risk of any Protestant uprising, the city would not be subject to any external attack or internal disorder during the war. Nevertheless, the baron de Cerny was appointed governor of the city in July. He ordered the council draw up a list of Protestants in the city, which was happily complied with by the city council. They provided Cerny a list of 25 names in September. No action was taken with the information on this list, as it was apparent the named were either not actually Protestants or presented no military threat to the city.

The duc de Nevers led an assault on a Protestant held château near Reims. He and his 1,600 soldiers tricked the garrison into emerging from the château and then slaughtered them.

=== Porcien's campaign ===
The prince de Porcien spent the spring pillaging the countryside of Champagne. He operated primarily from a base at Montcornet in northern Champagne. He initially made his way to join with Condé in Orléans, attempting to surprise Provins en route with the support of the towns Protestant bailli (baillif). After a couple of months with Condé he returned to Champagne via Strasbourg. In Strasbourg he recruited 100 cavalrymen. In July he was back in Champagne, operating around Joinville with the support of the seigneur d'Esternay who had been dispatched to the province by Condé. In response to the military threat his presence in the province posed, the town of Châlons introduced a garrison of around 300 soldiers for its defence against him. This was not satisfactory for the governor, the sieur de Bussy who tried to push another three companies on Châlons on the grounds that many Protestants were in the area, and could surprise Châlons at any moment. The city council rebuffed this offer, content in the services of their royal captain the sieur de Castel for their security. They argued more troops would worsen the plague, and moreover the number they had was sufficient. Bussy began selling off the property of Protestants that had fled from Châlons in August. While the council acquiesced to this, it refused Bussy's request for a list of all the Protestants resident in Châlons. During Autumn, Porcien returned, and his force began pillaging the area between the Meuse and Marne.

On 25 August, Porcien began a siege of Sainte-Menehould, which was governed by the sieur de Bussy. He brought to bear 4,000 foot soldiers and a further 800 cavalry. Bussy had entrusted the defence of Sainte-Menehould to a captain Lescouardin, who was able to repulse Porcien's attack. During the combat Porcien was wounded, and lifted the siege, his forces returning to plundering the surrounding countryside. The abbeys of Châtrices, Moirement, Moutier and Beaulieu were sacked by his men. During September his force successfully captured the château and priory of Sermaize.

== Normandy ==
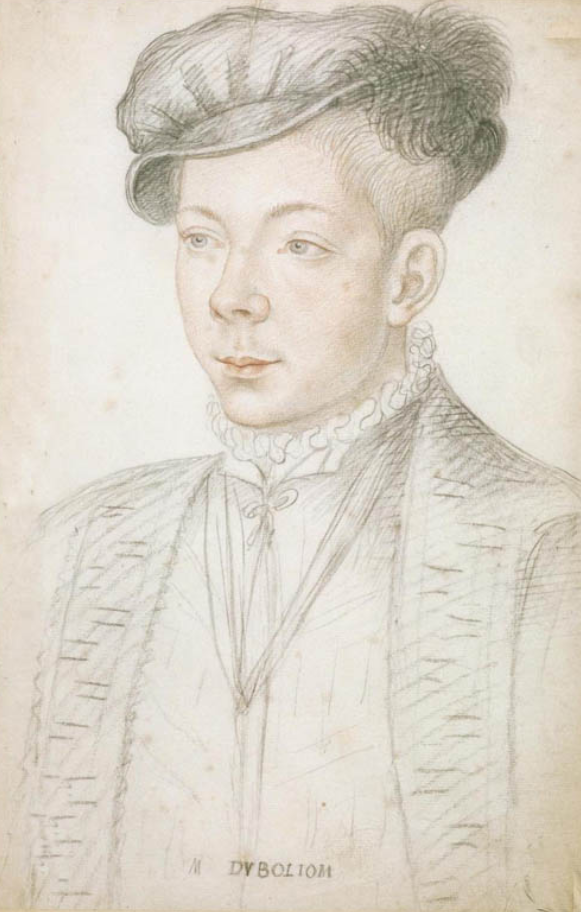
Duc de Bouillon, governor of Normandy who would form a third party during the civil war in the province of Normandy

Civil war in Normandy: Settlements in red were occupied by Protestant rebels during the war. Settlements in blue remained royalist throughout the war. Orange highlight denotes centre of the duc de Bouillon's 'third party'. Purple highlight denotes towns occupied by the English by the terms of the treaty of Hampton Court

Iconoclastic action and church seizures would occur in many Norman towns and cities including: Rouen, Dieppe, Caen, Caudebec, Jumièges, Saint-Martin-de-Boscherville, Bayeux, Elbeuf, Barentin, Limesy, Coutances, Avranches, Sées, Saint-Lô, Saint-Wandrille and Le Tréport. Now led by the more 'respectable' elements of Protestant society the iconoclasm was more systematic with inventories drawn up and auctions organised. The funds were to be used to fund the movement in the province.

During May Saint-Lô, Bayeux, Falaise, Vire, Lisieux, Carentan, Pont de l'Arche and Le Havre fell to Protestant rebel control.

=== Bouillon's party ===
The Protestant governor of Normandy did not affiliate with the rebel Protestants, or the crown and instead established a third party the purpose of which revolved around reinforcing his own authority in the province.

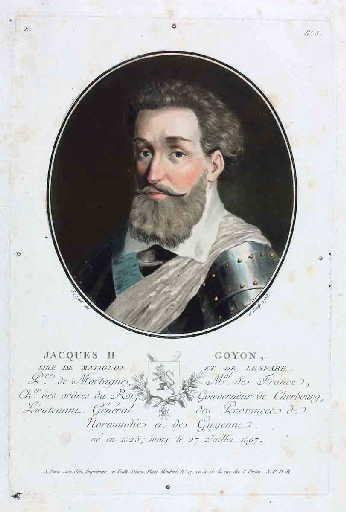
Seigneur de Matignon, lieutenant-general of lower Normandy and future marshal of France

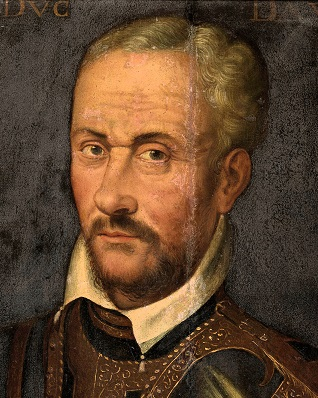
Duc d'Aumale, governor of Burgundy, granted powers of lieutenant-generalcy in Normandy during the war

Governor Bouillon was furious that the duc d'Aumale and the seigneur de Matignon had been provided with powers of lieutenant-generalcy in Normandy on 14 May to restore order in the province. Matignon was a client of the queens, and she hoped he would serve as a counterweight to Aumale. Even though Aumale was his uncle-in-law, Bouillon saw these commissions as attacks on his authority. He therefore established a headquarters in the château de Caen and with the support of local Protestants besieged Matignon in Cherbourg. Matignon undertook to increase the defences of Cherbourg while he awaited reinforcements.

Protestants and Catholics were able to exist together peaceably under Bouillon's auspices. Indeed, on 19 March 1563, Bouillon would introduce a policy of religious coexistence inside Sedan, a territory over which he was prince.

Bouillon corresponded with the court, complaining that the money he was owed for the campaigns he was conducting went unpaid. With the intervention of Guise and the duc de Montpensier at court in his favour the commissions of his captain Berteville were recognised and he was granted commission over three companies while Bouillon was allowed to utilise the treasury of Caen.

Late in 1562, he tried to put his captains in place, and gain acceptance for the return of Protestant refugees to the towns of Saint-Lô and Bayeux both of which were under Catholic control. They refused, and Bouillon declared the towns to be enemies of the king, lodging an appeal with the court.

=== Caen ===
On 28 April, the duc de Bouillon wrote to the officers of the baillage of Caen. He thanked them for the diligence they had shown in the maintenance of the city to this point. He informed them the crown had granted full powers to the captain d'Hugueville to act as governor. Soon thereafter, d'Hugueville ordered the stockpiling of foodstuff in the château. Dauvin thus speculates that d'Hugueville anticipated an attack.

According to a Catholic eyewitness the minister announced his intention to see the town rid of 'idols' in front of the judiciary of the city. With d'Hugueville seemingly preparing for an attack, a great wave of iconoclasm broke out on the evening of 8 May and continued through 9 May. This came shortly after the destruction of images in Rouen on 3–4 May. According to the later account of Bourgueville all the churches and monasteries were attacked with their images destroyed, windows shattered, ornaments pillaged and flammable elements all thrown into fires. One of the first targets for destruction was a fifteen feet tall cross under the window of one of the présidial judges. The city militia despite being close to much of the action maintained a complicit neutrality. Bourgueville would estimate the damage of the two days to be at the value of 100,000 écus. According to the historian it was only the arrival of Matignon which prevented an assault on the château from following the destruction of the churches.

The présidial court was divided between Protestants of a legalist persuasion who disapproved of iconoclasm, and those of a more revolutionary persuasion who approved of the acts. Bourgueville states (as an eyewitness) that when the iconoclasts presented themselves before the body after conducting their deeds, one of the Protestant justices absolved them of any criminal liability. The iconoclasts were paid for the work they had undertaken. By the violence of these days Catholic worship was de facto suspended. However the Protestants of Caen remained divided on whether to seize the opportunity and impose Protestantism on the city. While control would be assumed over many churches, the civic bodies of the city would continue to function as before, and the Protestants had failed to secure the château.

Catherine entrusted the duc de Bouillon with overseeing the preservation of Caen for the royalist cause. Bouillon arrived in front of the château on 20 May with two companies of soldiers. Bouillon made d'Hugueville depart his charge and then the city, alleging that the captain wished to establish Aumale over Caen. Locking himself up in the château, Bouillon had the nearby collegiate church destroyed with cannons on the grounds that its elevated position near the château was a security risk. He ordered the systematic looting of the remaining silverware from the churches of Caen to finance several companies of light horse under the Protestant commanders the sieur de Fervaques and Jean de Pellevé both of whom had been or would be responsible for the destruction of Catholic religious property.

On 4 September, Bouillon oversaw the ousting of the majority of the recently elected échevins replacing them with his own Protestant appointees. In doing this he took advantage with royal frustration with the municipal authorities of Caen.

In September the Protestant commander Montgommery was operating around Caen with around 3,000 footsoldiers and 800 horsemen. With the duc de Bouillon absent, he attempted to seize the city but the attempt was foiled with the conspirators inside Caen hanged.

Bouillon sponsored a delegation from Caen that pled with the court for liberty of conscience. The court responded on 21 October with an order that all Protestant preachers in Caen must depart on pain of death, with public Protestant worship prohibited. The governor of Normandy was able to broker a compromise by which public worship would cease but liberty of conscience and private practice of Protestantism would be permitted. This was published on 3 November. Nevertheless, Protestant ministers would have to depart from Caen. On 29 November the crown established a new captain of the château and city, the sieur de Renouard, a client of Jean III d'Annebault. While some of the Protestants of the city sought to make a good impression on their new commander, others felt with the loss of Bouillon a new protector was required.

Renouard undertook the disarmament of the population of Caen and saw to the transfer of all municipal arsenal contents to the château. By these means the Protestants of the city feared they would soon be subject to a similar repression as their co-religionists in Rouen.

On 14 February Coligny entered Caen. According to de Bèze the Protestant occupation came as a response to governor Renouard attempting to undertake a massacre of the city’s Protestant population before being stopped and pushed back by some exiles from Rouen. Meanwhile, according to the local historian Bourgueville, the Protestants took advantage of the poor authority enjoyed by the governor to see the gates opened for Coligny. Dauvin, highlighting an incident with the bell a couple of days prior finds the latter account more credible. Coligny's entry without need for a prolonged siege was a great scandal. With the city secured Coligny turned to the château where Renouard was held up and put it to siege. He was aided in his efforts by 2,000 English soldiers under Throckmonton. On 2 March Elbeuf surrendered the château to him. From 5 March de Bèze preached for ten days in Caen. Coligny departed Caen on 16 March after ordering the removal of the lead roofing of the abbey church, which would be melted down and sold for 80,000 livres. Montgommery was established as the cities new governor.

=== Dieppe ===
No sooner did word arrive of what had transpired at Wassy than Dieppe entered into a state of disorder with the Protestants assuming control of the city on 22 March. In the violence that followed 150 Protestants and Catholics would be killed. The Protestant captain of Dieppe, Ponsard, was a client of Coligny's.

The governor of Normandy, the duc de Bouillon visited Dieppe in April. He was granted a ceremonial entry into the city, but was informed his choice of governor for the city (a Catholic) was unacceptable. His failure to restore either Dieppe or Rouen to obedience with the crown led to his replacement as military leader of Normandy by the duc d'Aumale.

The Protestants of Dieppe, now in control came to the aid of nearby co-religionists who were more vulnerable. Cany, Veules and Saint-Valéry-en-Caux were thus attacked from Dieppe when news reached the city that there were 2,000 Catholic peasants in the area.

The commander of Dieppe, the seigneur de Briquemault was appointed as commander of Rouen in September. However, Briquemault would remain in Dieppe, writing appeals to Elizabeth for support without result. With the city subject to a siege he agreed to its surrender on 30 October. The English garrison was expelled on condition that private Protestant worship be respected. This surrender came in part from fear at seeing the brutal sack which Rouen had recently been subjected to. The Protestant governor who had replaced Bricquemalt, the sieur de La Curé was chased out of the city after the surrender.

In early 1563 Dieppe was again besieged. This time the comte de Brissac in command of a royalist force led the effort. Command of the defence was in the hands of the comte de Montgommery.

=== Rouen ===
In Rouen, word of the massacre of Wassy inspired panic and preparation from the cities Protestant population. This was then combined with word of Condé's manifesto. Therefore, when two Norman royal recruiters visited the city to raise soldiers, they were attacked, accused of plotting a new Wassy. One of them received injuries while the other was killed. The bailli of Rouen, Villebon visited the city a few days later. Villebon was an ultra-Catholic who over the prior years had developed an infamous reputation with the cities Protestants. Protestants accused him (either genuinely or disingenuously) of plotting to seize the weapons in the hôtel de ville (city hall) and therefore on 15 April the Protestants seized first the convent of the Celestines, and then the hôtel de ville. The beleaguered Villebon was besieged in the cities château. He quickly surrendered and fled, leaving the Protestants the masters of Rouen on 17 April, his lieutenant who was held up in the Vieux Palais having likewise surrendered. Control of Rouen (and Le Havre) allowed the Protestants to dominate the lower Seine. On 19 April the duc de Bouillon arrived in the city. The new leaders of the city stressed their continued loyalty to the king, arguing that they had only acted to prevent a new Wassy. Frustrated that the city would not in fact actually return to obedience, Bouillon departed, leaving his lieutenant the sieur de Martel in the city. In the city Catholic Mass was allowed to continue, and the Catholic members of the city council were left in place. This could not contain the more radical in the city, and Protestants went from church to church smashing Catholic paraphernalia and pulling it from the churches to burn in large bonfires. Catholic homes were invaded and arms seized. Therefore, by the end of May, most Catholics had departed Rouen. On 14 May, in the wake of the Protestant iconoclasm, Bouillon's lieutenant Martel withdrew from Rouen. The Parlement left into exile, and the Council of Twenty Four became solely Protestant in June. The Protestants of the city began a systematic weighing and melting down of precious metals in the city, and by this means raised around 57,000 livres which was put towards paying the garrison and preparing the cities fortifications.

Catherine negotiated with the city during this time, offering leniency in return for re-admission of royal officials into Rouen. The Rouennais leaders demanded that the recent commission granted to the duc d'Aumale to raise troops across the region be revoked. Catherine could not consent to this. On 28 May, Aumale arrived before Rouen and demanded the gates be opened to him, the city refused. He began a weak siege, lacking enough in the way of force (possessing only around 3,000 men) to truly threaten the city. He contented himself to harass the city. Meanwhile, he issued commissions to sympathetic nobles such as Villebon, and the clients of Brissac. Protestant soldiers from around Rouen flocked to the city’s defence. The combined Rouennais and external Protestant forces launched raids on nearby towns, such as Darnétal, Elbeuf and Caudebec. The Protestant commander in charge of Rouen at this time was the seigneur de Morvilliers who oversaw the receipt of reinforcements to resist Aumale from Orléans. Morvilliers could count on around 4,000 men in the city during June.

The exiled parlement, established at Louviers radicalised quickly, devoid of its chief moderates the minority ultra faction took charge. The parlement issued an arrêt in which they declared that Protestant worship would be prohibited in the regions of Normandy under royalist control. The parlements penchant for hanging random Protestants forced the court to despatch Michel de Castelnau in August to restrain their extreme impulses.

Aumale returned for a second attempt at besieging Rouen on 29 June, installing batteries in front of forte Sainte-Catherine. He would however achieve little more success at reducing the city than he had in his prior siege. He contented himself with giving licence to the nearby peasantry to attack the Protestant nobility. He financed himself through plunder, requisitioning the cloth of the Rouennais merchants that was at Brionne. In September Morvilliers found himself in conflict with his co-religionist Montgommery over the latter's desire to supplement the city’s defence with English forces and withdrew from the city. To replace Morvilliers the seigneur de Bricquemault was chosen, however he could not reach Rouen.

=== Honfleur ===
On 21 July, Honfleur was seized by the duc d'Aumale.

=== Bayeux ===
The bishop of Bayeux was captured by Protestants, but the Catholic townspeople were able to successfully see to his release.

=== Le Havre ===
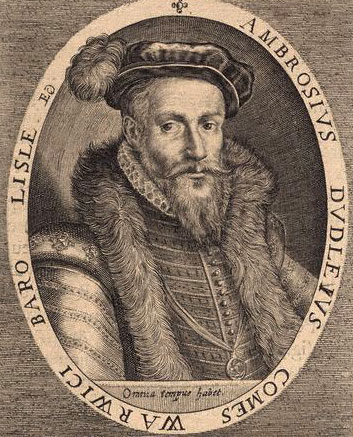
Earl of Warwick the English commander of Le Havre after the surrender of the city to the English as part of the treaty of Hampton Court

On 16 April, Le Havre was seized by the Protestant commander Maligny, who had been involved in the conspiracy of Amboise. In assuming control he expelled from command the Catholic lieutenant Jean de Cros. This came as a blow to the royalist cause as it facilitated contact with England. His seizure of Le Havre was of considerable concern to the government, as it was the primary port of supply. As a term of the treaty of Hampton Court, Le Havre was to be handed over to the English. An English force departed Portsmouth on 1 October and received Le Havre on 4 October.

The English commander of Le Havre, the earl of Warwick was besieged by Marshal de Vielleville during December. Vielleville based himself out of Caudebec for the purpose of the siege. During January around 7,000 German mercenaries were involved in the siege, and they terrorised the countryside around Le Havre.

=== Vire ===
In August there would be Catholic riots in Vire, with the duc de Bouillon re-establishing order.

=== Caudebec ===
The day after the capture of Le Havre, the Protestants secured Caudebec by means of an uprising. Troops loyal to the Protestant cause had been secreted into the city in prior days, which enabled Caudebec to resist an attempted siege by a local royalist force.

=== Lisieux ===
On 5 May the Protestant bailli of Évreux and the captain of Tancarville, a client of Longueville's, jointly pillaged the cathedral town of Lisieux.

When the duc de Bouillon arrived at Lisieux he ensured the resumption of Catholic worship in the town. He would however provide a Protestant governor to counterbalance this restoration.

=== Tancarville ===
The Protestant prince Longueville's château at Tancarville became a haven for Protestants fleeing from Catholic attacks. In October Longueville wrote to the captain of Tancarville instructing him to surrender the château to the royalists.

=== Valognes ===
Peace was initially maintained between Catholics and Protestants in Valognes. A bi-confessional assembly of notables agreed to resist calls to arm and expel populations and instead abide by the king's edicts together in peace. A bi-confessional militia was able to keep the peace when there was an incident around Pentecost. However, on 7 June Catholic militia-men fired on a group of Protestant notables. Most of the Protestants were able to escape thanks to the protection of their Catholic neighbours. The killing would not go unavenged, and a local Protestant force entered the town and killed a Franciscan monk.

Bouillon for his part dispatched a military provost to Valognes to punish the perpetrators. The Catholics of Valognes threw the provost into prison and declared that their loyalty was not to Bouillon but rather to the lieutenant-general Matignon in Cherbourg. Bouillon therefore attacked and conquered Valognes with 2,200 men and had some of the rioters hanged, before making preparations to attack Cherbourg.

== Lyonnais ==
=== Lyon ===
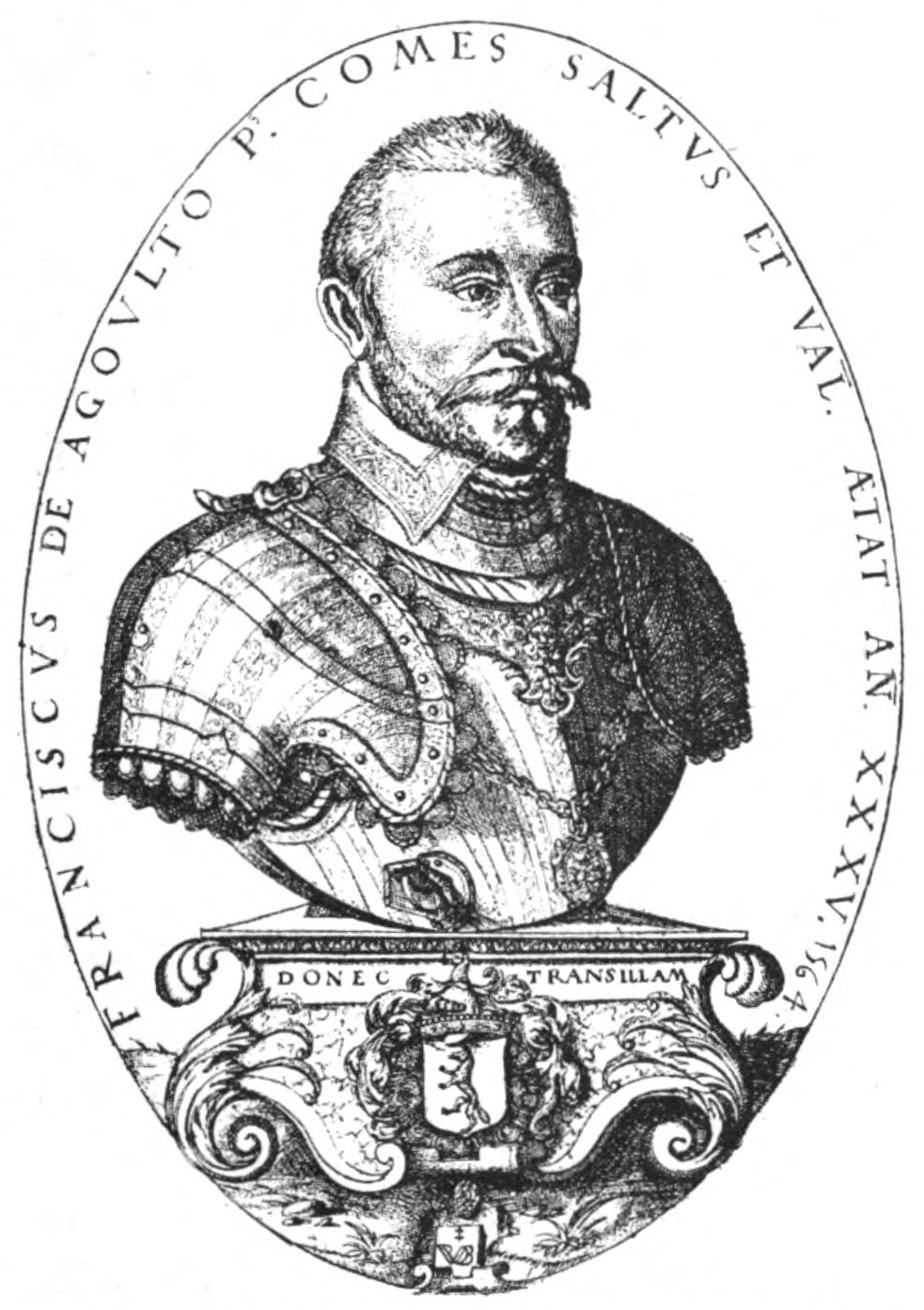
Comte de Sault, governor of Lyon for the crown

It was not possible to establish the Edict of Saint-Germain in the kingdom's second city as it was increasingly consumed by more extreme factions of Protestants (who wanted total freedom of worship) and Catholics determined to resist the edicts application.

The governor the comte de Sault, who though not Protestant himself, was sympathetic to Protestantism, and was suspected of involvement in the Protestant coup that seized the city on the night of 29 April. He had been appointed to the charge in 1561. In the proceeding months, the administration of Lyon had paid La Motte-Gondrin to quarter his troops outside the city proper (leaving him in the faubourg de Vaise) and turned down a request by Saint-André to construct a fortified gate on the Saône bridge, by which means the more Protestant parts of the city could have been isolated.

Only the canons of Saint-Jean and the governor put up resistance to the Protestant coup that acquired the city. The church of Saint-Nizier and the hôtel de ville were seized, the former protected with guards. The towers that guarded the squares were likewise conquered. The cathedral of Lyon was subject to a sacking, with a Protestant pastor invading the cathedral sword in hand to this end. Thus the Protestants acquired what they had failed to seize in September 1560. One of the Protestant ministers of Lyon, Jacques Ruffy was particularly involved in the violent seizure of the city who even bore arms. This action was reported to Geneva, and earned Ruffy a rebuke from Calvin, with Calvin going on to chide the ministers of the city generally for their role in the coup. Calvin highlighted that he had been informed Ruffy had confronted the governor of Lyon with a pistol and boasted of the Protestant forces in the city. Soon after the Protestant conquest, the baron des Adrets arrived, he had not been given a commission to govern Lyon (his authority limited to Dauphiné), but he assumed it unilaterally. There was little protest to his acquisition, as it was assumed he would soon depart back to Dauphiné.

The new Protestant administration of Lyon prohibited the participation of Catholics in the city’s consulate. Many of the bankers of the city were Catholic and departed, however some affiliated themselves with the Protestant administration. Lyon was governed by the brutal Protestant commander the baron des Adrets from May to July. He had the former clerical property of the city carefully inventoried while other items were destroyed. His brutal command was so displeasing to Condé and Coligny that he was replaced in the city by the sieur de Soubise in July. Soubise wrote to Catherine explaining that he remained totally loyal to the king and that as soon as Charles and Catherine were at liberty he would restore Lyon to their control and obey all their commands. In September, orders were issued in the 'name of the king' by which blasphemy and gaming were outlawed, with attendance of Protestant services made mandatory. Commerce was to be prohibited during hours of worship.

The city held out against attempts by the royalist duc de Nemours to reduce it. The Protestants would hold Lyon until 1563 when it was returned to the royalist fold through negotiation as opposed to military force.

After the disgrace of Adrets from the Protestant cause, the seigneur de Montbrun would assume the military role he had held over the Lyonnais, Dauphiné and Vivarais.

== Maine ==
The royalist Catholic sieur de Champagne et de Parcé was responsible for the conduct of various atrocities in Maine. He had suspected Protestants thrown into a deep lake, and was reported to have remarked as he did that he would make them 'drink from his big bowl'.

=== Le Mans ===
In Le Mans, the Protestants forced their bishop Charles d'Angennes to flee from the city around the time of the Massacre of Wassy. A meeting was conducted to plan for the seizure of the city on 1 April at the hôtel de Vignolles under the leadership of the seigneur de la Rochère featuring various grandees of the city. Control of Le Mans itself was secured by the rebels on 3 April. The Protestant seizure was accompanied by a wave of pillage against the churches and convents of the city. Treasures were removed from the cathedral, manuscripts were set ablaze. The cardinal de Luxembourg was disinterred from his resting place. The primary offenders in this destruction were the bourgeois and 'notables' segments of the Protestant population. With the Catholic population fleeing, the city remained in the hands of Protestant soldiers for three months. The city’s Protestant military leader was La Motte Thibergeau and he was supported by the future comte de La Suze (a cousin of the sieur de Champagne's). On 29 April, the Protestants of Le Mans remonstrated the king, echoing the manifesto that Condé had issued, they pled with the king to hear their arguments about the cruelty of Guise, the 'architect of Wassy'. On 11 July, the bishop returned at the head of a military company and re-secured the city for the royalists. Back in power, the bishop went house to house across the nobility of Le Mans securing participation in a Catholic League he had founded. La Motte Thibergeau led an exodus of Protestants into Normandy.

== Anjou ==
The governor of Anjou, Touraine and Maine, the duc de Montpensier, found himself short on artillery for the conduct of his local campaign. He therefore made request of the governor of Brittany, Étampes, who informed him that no captain in his province would provide such resources to him without his explicit authorisation. After Étampes wrote to the local commanders, Montpensier would receive Breton powder.

=== Angers ===
In Angers, Montpensier oversaw brutalities against Protestants. At his instruction the Protestants were variously hanged, beheaded and beaten.

The city was conquered for the rebel Protestant cause by an alliance of the urban and rural nobility. La Rochefoucauld was operating around Angers in May, keen for revenge himself for Montpensier's cruelties.

== Touraine ==
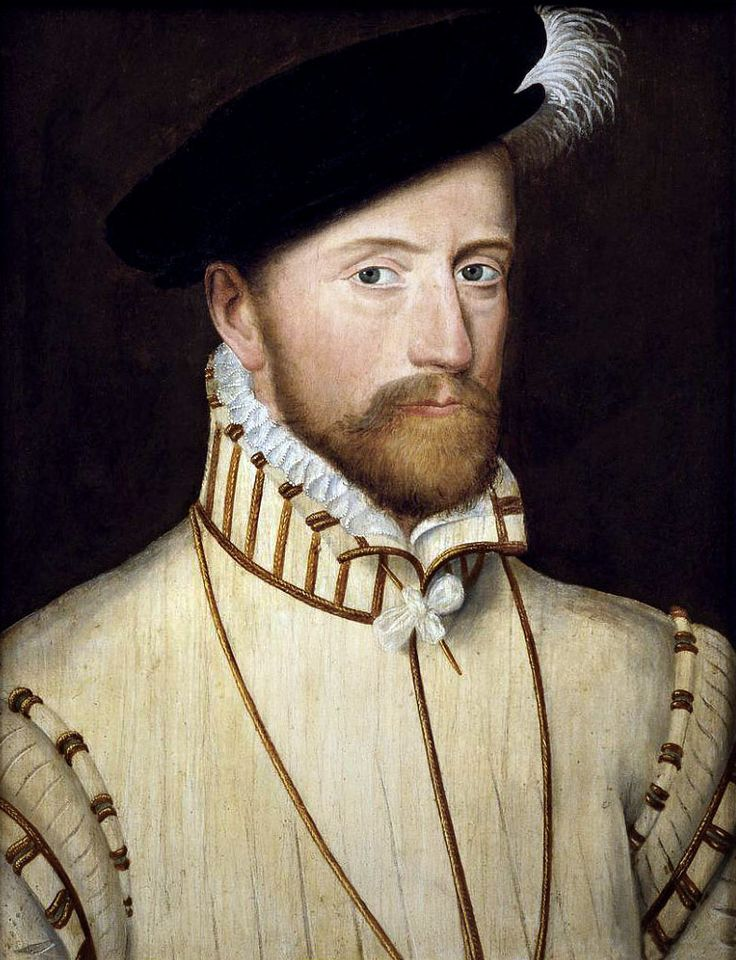
Marshal de Saint-André who recaptured Tours for the crown

=== Tours ===
Montpensier, governor of Touraine, oversaw the execution of a butcher of Tours who was found to be selling meat during Lent. Following this some Protestants were imprisoned in the residence of the archbishop. Montpensier then retired to his estates at Champigny, leaving the field open to the Protestants.

On 30 March, prior even to Condé's capture of Orléans, a group of several hundred Protestants captured the château de Tours with little resistance. A few days later the rest of the city fell to them. Representatives from Condé in Orléans soon arrived. With the city in their hands the cathedral of Tours was subject to iconoclastic violence alongside the abbey of Saint-Martin where the shrine was broken on 5 April. Precious metals were melted down and sent off to pay Condé's emerging army in Orléans. Saints remains were also burned, as was the fate of saint François de Paule who was kept in Plessis-lès-Tours.

In July Saint-André put Tours to siege. The Protestants negotiated their safe withdrawal and surrendered the city. Saint-André proved either unable or unwilling to honour this agreement. Hundreds were massacred and thrown into the river Loire. The Protestant mayor was dismissed and all Protestants still alive in the city were to swear a confession of faith to Catholic judges or depart the city. When Montpensier arrived in the city he ordered a list of all the Protestants in the administration be drawn up so that they might be purged.

Montpensier did not find governing easy in this period. In December 1562, he wrote to the court protesting that all his requests for royal favours for his clients went unanswered, leaving him unable to command respect or maintain his fidelity network properly. It was only through his personal funds that Montpensier was able to reward those who served him, he protested.

=== Chinon and Loudon ===
Guise oversaw the recapture of Chinon and Loudon for the royalist cause.

== Burgundy ==
After the departure of the governor Aumale to Normandy, the duc de Guise was established as governor in his absence.

=== Dijon ===
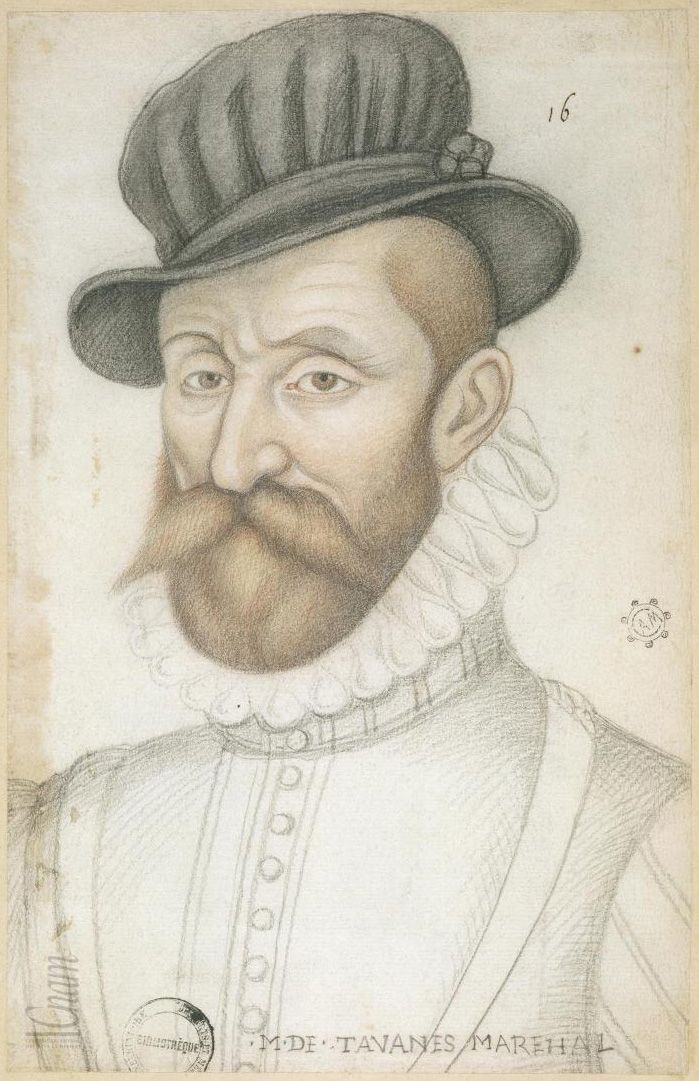
Lieutenant-general of Burgundy, the seigneur de Tavannes who led the royalist resistance in Burgundy

A Protestant plan to seize Dijon by internal coup was foiled. The mayor and city council of Dijon wrote to Aumale, pleading with him to greenlight the arrest of all Protestants who violated the Edict of Saint-Germain. This was despite the fact the council had little intention to register the edict or enforce its terms of toleration. Among many grievances voiced by the council to their governor the centrepiece was the Protestant attacks on the Eucharist. In total they made twelve complaints to Aumale which covered the range of social life from the election of the previous year to observance of feast days. Tavannes, the lieutenant-general of the province, began acting without waiting for word from Aumale. On 8 May he ordered all Protestant preachers in Dijon present themselves before the hôtel de ville the next morning, so that they could receive safe conduct out of Dijon. Any who did not leave would be liable to be hanged without judicial process. Tavannes was encouraged in his efforts by Catherine, who wrote to him in June that he should continue his efforts to cleanse Burgundy from the 'plague of heresy' introduced by preachers into the region. The lieutenant-general ordered the council to undertake a survey of Dijon in which all heads of households would be asked to swear that they would live and die as Catholics. They also supplied him with a force of 500 men to expel from Dijon those who refused. Tavannes would later boast in his memoirs that he had expelled around 1,500 valets huguenots from Dijon, largely Swiss and German immigrants.

Of the cities roughly 500-600 Protestants, many fled the city before the government of Dijon could begin to suppress them.

=== Mâcon ===
After the Protestant seizure of Mâcon in Burgundy, the lieutenant-general of Burgundy Tavannes prepared to counter-attack. He requested 200 militiamen from Dijon to support him in the attack against Mâcon, the Dijon council despatched 500 to him instead. Mâcon fell to the royalists sometime before 2 September. This proved disheartening to Protestant refugees from Toulouse who fled to Geneva.

=== Auxerre ===
Upon the Catholic recapture of Auxerre a large scale massacre followed at the impetus of the troops. According to Protestant accounts around 100 people were killed.

=== Tavannes campaign ===
Tavannes succeeded in gaining mastery over the Saône valley during June. He captured Châlon from the Protestant seigneur de Montbrun (who had taken the city on 31 May) then succeeded in capturing Mâcon by a surprise assault. He further repulsed an attempted move of 6,000 Swiss soldiers out from Lyon, forcing them to retreat to the city. He was assisted in these campaigns, by 4,000 Swiss of his own, which had arrived in June.

== Three Bishoprics ==
In the Three-Bishoprics the rebel Protestants attempted to undertake an attack on Verdun during 1562. The attack stalled before one of the city gates over which there was a niche featuring Mary. According to the defenders Mary turned to face them to indicate her support for their cause, and this began a tradition in the city.

== Poitou ==
In Poitou, the Protestants seized Fontenay, Luçon, La Châtaigneraie, Chantonnay, Le Puybelliard, Foussais, Monsireigne, Thiré and Pouillé. The Cathedral of Luçon was subject to a thorough sack of what could be found inside on 30 April. In the surrounding areas of pillaged churches only Protestant worship existed. Catholic counter-attacks resulted in reprisals and revenge killings. Fontenay was recaptured by Catholic forces in July 1562, the Protestants of the town either leaving or being arrested.

=== Poitiers ===
Condé's manifesto reached Poitiers on 13 April. Initially the Catholics and Protestants of the city decided to collaborate in control of the gates. After the Catholics at the gates denied entry to a Protestant noble to the city, the Protestants took over the Tranchée gate and let in the troops of their co-religionists. This was not however the end of attempts to compromise in Poitiers, and while there were incidents of iconoclastic violence, others swore to maintain the peace.

Both sides manoeuvred to assure themselves of control of the château, and by May the receveur général François Pineau was in firm control of the château, while all the gates were in the hands of the Protestants. Condé dispatched the sieur de Sainte-Gemme as his governor of the city. After his arrival he confiscated all the gate keys, the valuables of the churches and insisted the Catholics disarm. He allowed troops under the seigneur de Grammont to pass through the city, and during their stay they sacked many of the churches. Despite Sainte-Gemme's overarching control of Poitiers, he lacked control of the château. Pineau resisted all attempts towards his removal.

The sieur de Sainte-Gemme served as the rebel replacement to the royal lieutenant-general of Poitou, the comte de Lude, who responded by retreating to Niort.

When forces under Saint-André and Villars arrived outside the city and began an attack, Pineau allied himself with the cities attackers, turning the guns of the château on the defenders of the city, aiding their victory. The siege of Poitiers lasted ten days. The victorious royal army subjected Poitiers to a thorough sack on 31 May. Saint-André had the Protestant mayor Herbert hanged alongside many other Protestants of the city.

Condé had entrusted a force under the command of La Rochefoucauld with frustrating Saint-André's campaign, however he was driven into Saintonge by Saint-André.

=== Saint-Maixent ===
In Saint-Maixent the Protestants engaged in iconoclasm and then seized the church of the Cordeliers. After some Protestants passed by on their way to Poitiers, the Protestants claimed that the Catholic prior of the town had committed an offence against their pastor during his prayers. He was arrested but this was not sufficient for the Protestants. They approached the mayor and échevins under arms, asking that the prior be handed over to them so they could kill him. Facing refusal they marched on the château but were dispersed by forces of the lieutenant Cherray.

== Angoumois ==
The Protestants seized Angoulême, Cognac and Aubeterre in the Angoumois. After the capture of the former, the tomb of the French king Jean II was subject to abuses. The other cities were subject to looting also.

After the royal recapture of Poitiers, the Protestant held cities of Angoulême and Cognac were recaptured, each one witnessed reprisals and violence with its recapture.

== Saintonge ==
The Protestant nobility of Saintonge came together in April and chose Saint-Martin de La Coudre as their leader. In combination with forces from neighbouring Poitou and the Angoumois this force marched north to rendezvous with Condé at Orléans. The nobility had taken the lead over the clerical elements of Protestantism, which in Saintonge had met in Saint-Jean-d'Angély to issue the call to arms.

=== Saint-Jean-d'Angély ===
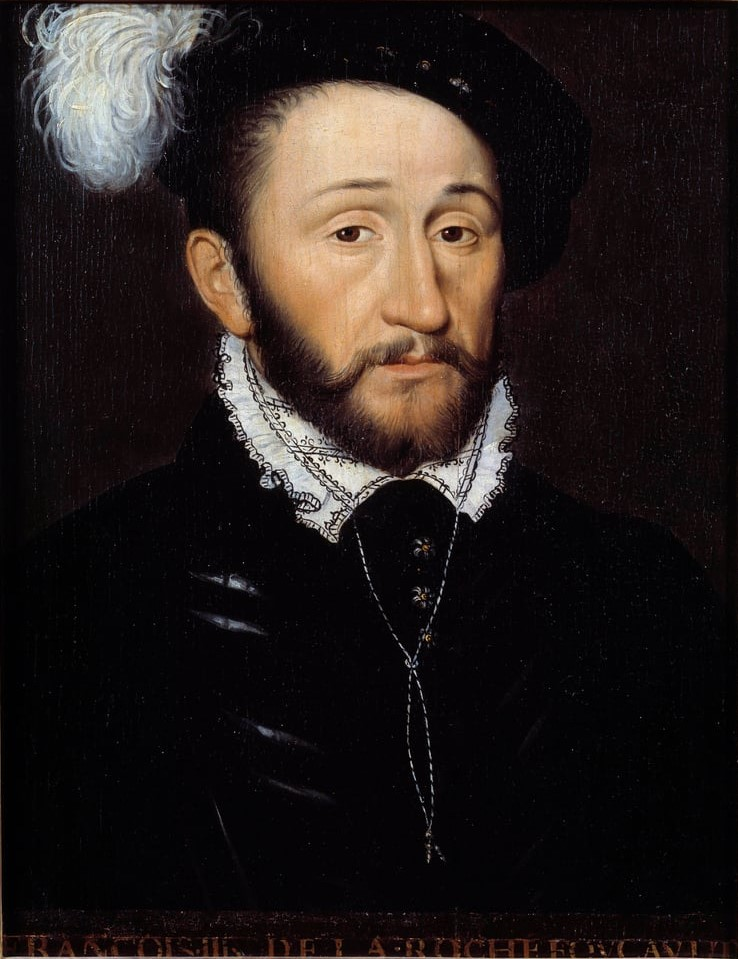
Comte de La Rochefoucauld, Protestant rebel commander during the First French War of Religion responsible for the siege of Saint-Jean-d'Angély

A Protestant synod of some description was held in Saint-Jean-d'Angély on 25 March. Noblemen and ministers were present for a discussion as to whether armed resistance was justified in response to the 'captivity' of the royal family and to defend liberty of conscience (Kingdon notes that at this time Guise and Navarre had yet to assume control of Catherine and Charles). The assembly concluded that they did possess the right in that circumstance to assume arms. The call to arms also pre-dated the seizure of Orléans.

During October, the comte de La Rochefoucauld was in the process of besieging Saint-Jean-d'Angély until word arrived of the defeat of the seigneur de Duras by Monluc, and he hurried to put himself at the head of the remaining Protestant forces from the battle so they could still make it north to Orléans.

== Aunis ==
=== La Rochelle ===
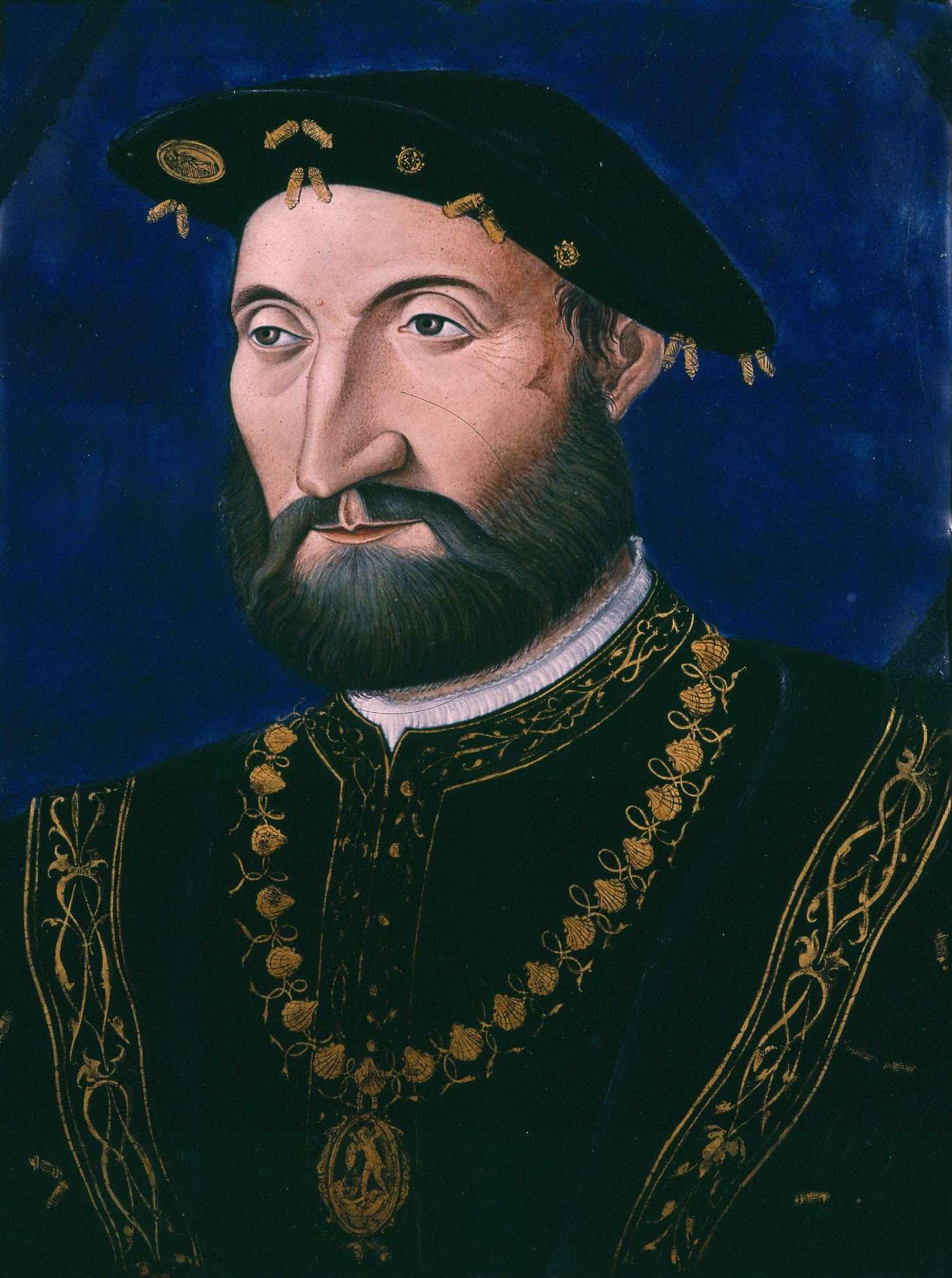
Baron de Jarnac, governor of La Rochelle and the pays d'Aunis

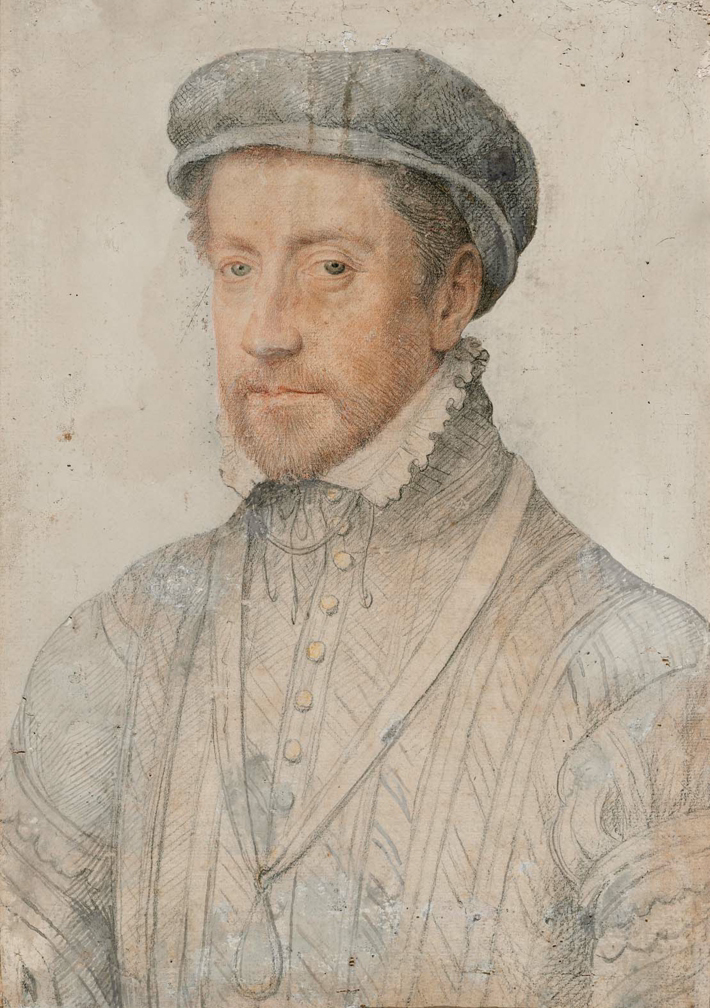
Duc de Montpensier, who engineered a Catholic coup to assume control over La Rochelle

In La Rochelle, a degree of order was maintained at first. Though the city elected a Protestant mayor in response to the massacre of Wassy, the governor assured Catherine the city was largely composed of good men. He urged Catherine to further expand religious liberties, and reinforce his gendarmerie to keep the peace in the city. Neither request was responded to. Condé's appeal for financial aid was answered by a Rochelais pastor, but Jarnac and the council were able to counter this by having him expelled. On 31 May a wave of iconoclastic violence swept La Rochelle with many churches being sacked. The Protestant mayor and Jarnac condemned the acts. La Rochefoucauld entreated La Rochelle and Jarnac to declare for Condé over the course of several embassies however Jarnac refused and the council sent deputies to the king professing their loyalty to the crown. La Rochefoucauld decided to organise a coup in La Rochelle, however it was discovered shortly before it was due to go off on 26 September. Jarnac confronted the rebel Protestants firing on them with cannons from the arsenal, driving them from the city.

After the failure of this conspiracy, the duc de Montpensier, who was commanding royal forces in Guyenne, made known his desire to visit La Rochelle. To assuage urban concern he promised it would only be with a personal retinue of 40 men. This was a lie, and along with Jarnac, who was aggrieved by La Rochefoucauld's attempted coup, he introduced several hundred of his soldiers into La Rochelle disguised as common people. On 27 October they assumed control of the city and allowed a regiment of Montpensier's troops into La Rochelle. In the wake of the coup, Jarnac became loathed by many in La Rochelle, and he left on 3 November, threatened with assassination. Montpensier banned Protestantism in La Rochelle and expelled Protestant pastors. He further deposed the Protestant mayor. The moderate Protestants of La Rochelle were driven into the arms of the more radical. The residents of the city unable to militarily oppose Montpensier's force raised an indemnity of 10,000 livres which persuaded him to leave on 15 November, leaving behind a garrison of 1,200 men. On 27 December citizens of La Rochelle attacked the garrison, seizing gates and towers in such a way as to divide the force in the city. The captains fled La Rochelle, and the remains of the garrison negotiated their withdrawal.

Emboldened, an agent of La Rochefoucauld's attempted another coup in favour of Condé. On 8 February a small force of outsiders were introduced to La Rochelle and linked up with militant parts of the population. La Rochefoucauld's captain would however become bogged down besieging a gate, allowing the former Protestant mayor to regroup the moderates and scatter the coup plotters. The captain and some of his subordinates were tried and executed for treason on the advice of the lieutenant-general Burie.

=== Atlantic islands ===
On the Île d'Oléron the citadel of Saint-Pierre was attacked. On the nearby Île de Ré, the Protestants adopted an attitude of neutrality in the conflict. This did not save them from being subjected to pillage and depredations by the Catholic commander Monluc and a monk named Richelieu.

== Berry ==
=== Bourges ===
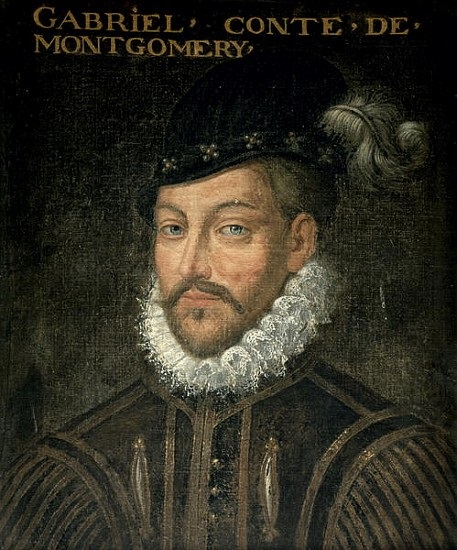
Comte de Montgommery, accidental killer of Henri II and Protestant commander responsible for the capture of Bourges, defence of Rouen and other campaigns

Bourges was brought into the civil war in May, with its church being destroyed in the violence. The city was captured by the Protestants on 27 May. The destruction was led by the troops under the command of the comte de Montgommery. The grave of Louis XII's wife was violated. As Montgommery's troops entered the city they had taken shots at the scene of the last judgement which was part of the city gates.

== Orléanais ==
=== Orléans ===
In Orléans, radical Protestants burned the preserved heart of the recently deceased king François II. His entrails were thrown to the dogs. Busts of Louis XI and Louis XII that adorned the cities hôtel de ville were destroyed. On 7 August a munitions depot in Orléans exploded, and Montmorency wrote that the situation was becoming dim for the rebel Protestants who were beginning to 'lose hope.’

One of the most senior Protestant captains, the seigneur de Piennes earned himself a poor reputation among his co-religionists by his conduct in Orléans.

During 1563, after the conduct of morning prayers, the Protestant priests of Orléans would oversee the reinforcing of the city’s fortifications.

=== Cléry ===
In Cléry similar actions against the royal body were undertaken, with the tomb of Louis XI being violated. A copper statue of the king was also decapitated. For some Protestants, Louis XI was a particularly objectionable king.

=== Beaugency ===
Condé decided to strike at Beaugency in July and subjected the city to bombardment. A hole was made in the wall through which the soldiery was able to enter on 3 July. The capture of Beaugency by Protestant forces was accompanied by a bloody sack of the city. Rapes, murders, and pillage followed. Neither Protestant nor Catholic households were safe from the rampage of the troops. The Protestant captain La Noue commented that the soldiers had more fury for the civilian population than they did for the garrison of Beaugency.

== Brittany ==
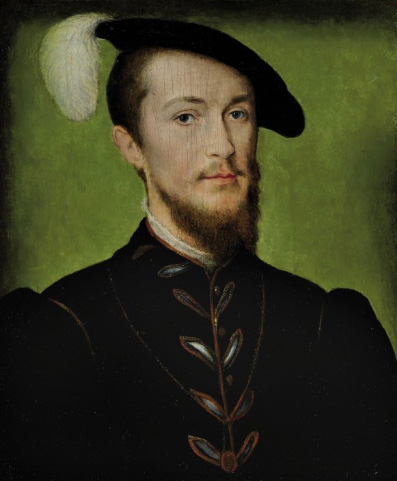
Duc d'Étampes, governor of Brittany

While Protestant captains, such as Louis d'Acingé the captain of Tréguier or Christophe du Matz, the captain of the diocese of Nantes, had been begrudgingly tolerated by Étampes in the years before the war, by 1562 the governor of Brittany felt it necessary to purge them from the ranks. Instead of using the arrière ban to bring to bear a quantity of nobles, he would look instead for more carefully chosen companies to conduct his military efforts. Indeed, during June he expressed to the crown that rather than feudal service he would rather have a paid army at his disposal. During April the baron de Vassé took charge of Laval so that it could not be betrayed to the Protestant rebels. Étampes was aware of disorders in neighbouring Anjou, but wished to ensure that he would not be seen as overstepping his authority by launching campaigns across the provincial borders, and therefore wrote to the king to ask permission to campaign outside his governate. Well aware of the apprehensions of the governor to work across provincial borders, rebel Protestants tried to exploit the border area to avoid suppression, as with a band from Montaigu who crossed the border to sack a Breton church near Clisson. In May Étampes announced that unless there was aggression against Brittany from a neighbouring province, he would not strike out of the border, by this means he in part sought to appease the Protestants of Brittany. In June Montpensier directly appealed for his support, but Étampes would not leave without royal instruction (he was also aware the terms of the arrière ban did not apply to service outside the home province of the noble). Though on a pacific footing, Étampes had assembled a sizable force by this time, boasting around 7,000 men for the repelling of any thrusts by the English.

With the successes of the royal army in July the pressure for Étampes to campaign into the interior lessened and indeed he received explicit royal orders in August that his priorities should be to fend off any potential English attacks from the north and maintain the peace in Brittany. This policy was interrupted by the intrusion of the Protestant army of Montgommery into several parishes of the province around Pontorson. Étampes returned to requesting of the court that he be granted permission to clear the effected border area of Protestants, and was supported in this by the Catholics of Pontorson who requested of him on 12 August that he provide support to ensure the town remained in royal hands. They highlighted if Montgommery captured Pontorson it would both allow for English landings on the mainland, but also enable him to menace Saint-Lô, Caen, Rennes, Dinan, Fougères, Le Mans and Angers.

=== Étampes' Normandy campaign ===
In August Étampes wrote to the crown to protest that no further taxes be raised. He argued that those already imposed had caused Protestants to begin a new spree of iconoclasm. As a result of the situation in Normandy, Catherine resolved that while the royal army would capture Protestant held Rouen, Étampes would be used for the purpose of restoring order in lower Normandy and rescuing the lieutenant-general Matignon. Before departing on his campaign into Normandy, Étampes needed to be assured of the security of several châteaux and settlements where the Protestant Laval family had influence. He therefore imposed lieutenants with authority over the town and château de Vitre and those of Montfort. Nobles who joined him on the campaign across the border into Normandy would be paid volunteers. Even with pay many nobles remained uninterested and Étampes looked to other men to form his army. As he moved into Normandy he found himself at the head of around 3,500 men. Weak in artillery, he took two pieces on loan from Rennes alongside the arsenal of Lamballe. Aware of his plans the Protestants attempted to seize the arsenal, but without success. On 16 August his force arrived in Fougères, from there he made to Pontorson, securing the town on 26 August to the delight of the Catholics. In front of Ducey, a stronghold of Montgommery on 30 August he put it to siege. A few days later on 2 September he secured Avranches before capturing Vire from Montgommery on 6 September. As he got deeper into Normandy he found himself increasingly facing Protestant skirmishing parties, but he was able to brush them aside with ease. His force was augmented by troops under the command of two of the Lorraine brothers, the duc d'Aumale and the grand prieur. Matignon also offered a small force to his army. The joint presence of the lieutenant-generals of Normandy eased any concerns Étampes might have had about overstepping his prerogatives, he made a great show of deferring to Matignon and involving him in his processes. Over the coming month he moved back and forth over the conquered territories increasingly concerned with his supply situation. Étampes' force arrived in Bayeux around October. Étampes resolved to watch over four strongholds, Bayeux, Saint-Lô, Avranches, and Granville. Greatly concerned by his successes, Condé and Coligny urge Elizabeth to organise an invasion of Brittany though this would not come to pass. By October's end Étampes resolves to join with the main royal army, and makes his way to join the besieging army in front of Rouen. He ensures that he avoids the governor of Normandy who was held up in Caen on his journey to the siege lines. He would stay with the royal army until the end of the year, his troops distinguishing themselves in front of Paris, his nephew Martigues and the troops fighting at Dreux while Étampes remains with the royal family.

=== Nantes ===
In April various measures were undertaken to reinforce the city of Nantes. The watch was increased, provisions audited and the cities water gate sealed. The Protestants would at first be allowed to maintain themselves in Nantes in line with the Edict of Saint-Germain. The Cathedral chapter was even unable to prevent the continued sale of Protestant literature.

In Nantes, Étampes protested the diverse commands that were being sent out by the royal authorities. He complained that Navarre ordered him to seize the arms of the local Protestants while Montmorency urged him to drive Protestants from the territory. Similar complaints about contradictory orders from the royal centre would be levied by the comte de Lude, the lieutenant-general of Poitou. He further protested the royal suggestions that he fund himself by seizing the treasuries of Catholic held towns, which was argued to him on the grounds that it would prevent neutral Protestants from becoming rebels. He protested that this would be a cause for tumult. Étampes warned that if he was forced to dismiss his men for lack of pay, they would join the rebels as they would 'follow the money'.

In July, Étampes held a disputation between several Protestant and Catholic notables at the château de Nantes. As with Poissy this failed to find any unity, however his aim was to show that coexistence was possible, clients of Rohan and Andelot were invited, who may have been tempted to join with their patrons in rebellion. In August Étampes and Martigues had to depart from Nantes to fight rebels in southern Normandy. Recognising things might descend into violence without his presence, Étampes ordered a prohibition of Protestant worship before he left. That month royal orders arrived in Brittany ordering the removal of all Protestant ministers from the province, these orders were received by the governor of Nantes, Sanzay. The bourgeois of Nantes attempted a purge of suspected Protestants from the présidial court. While many Protestants of Nantes fled to Protestant strongholds such as Blain, some remained and continued to practice in Nantes. Protestantism continued to be tolerated as long as it was in the privacy of ones home and did not involve public non-conformity. With the threat of an English presence on the Loire a captain de La Tour was despatched by the crown to protect Nantes with a request that 300 soldiers be raised for him. Sanzay however preferred to rely on a local militia, and expanded this body to 400 men. He complained to Étampes that La Tour's force was an unnecessary burden on the city. By December he protested that he lacked funds to pay the garrison, the château was devoid of provisions and his orders were increasingly disregarded.

=== Guérande, Blain and La Roche-Bernard ===
In these towns where Protestant lords held sway, the massacre of Wassy was responded to with the assumption of arms and the strengthening of defences. However this did not precipitate fighting. Blain in particular, a fief of the Rohan family was fortified.

=== Dinan ===
Étampes was suspicious that the captain of Dinan, Jacques de Forsans was a Protestant, there was therefore a risk that he could betray the town to the Protestants. He could not however dismiss the captain, who enjoyed close relations to the Albret and Navarre families. Therefore, Étampes installed a lieutenant for the town named Jean de Rieux, sieur de Châteauneuf whose authority would supersede the captains. The captain was greatly aggrieved by this usurpation but resigned himself to his situation submitting to Rieux's command of the town.

Though he had protested his loyalty to Étampes after the appointment of Rieux, a month later when Rieux began to impose himself more fully on Dinan with a review of the nobility he had mobilised, Forsans defected to the Protestant rebels.

=== Belle Île ===
During the war, the governor of the island of Belle Île was offered command of the town of Vire by one of the lieutenant-generals of Normandy the seigneur de Matignon, but declined. He justified his refusal by his fear that if something were to happen in his governate in his absence he would find himself in trouble.

=== Brest ===
A captain of 100 soldiers in the city of Brest was found to be absent from his charge, Étampes therefore had them replaced by the captain of the city, Jérôme de Carné.

== Île de France ==
=== Paris ===
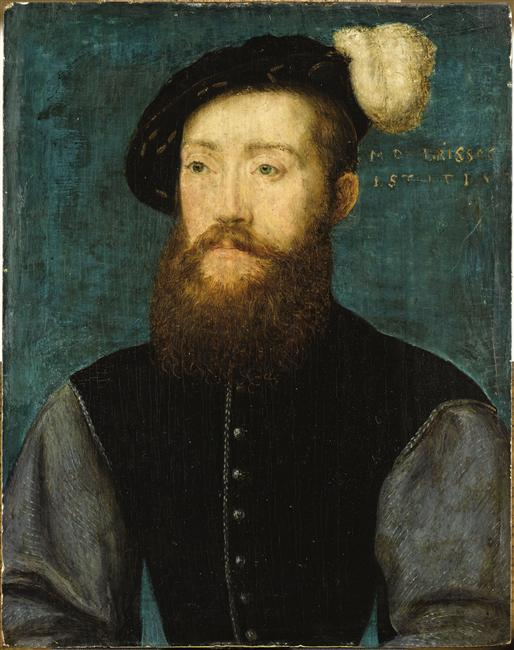
Marshal de Brissac, first lieutenant-general of Paris during the civil war

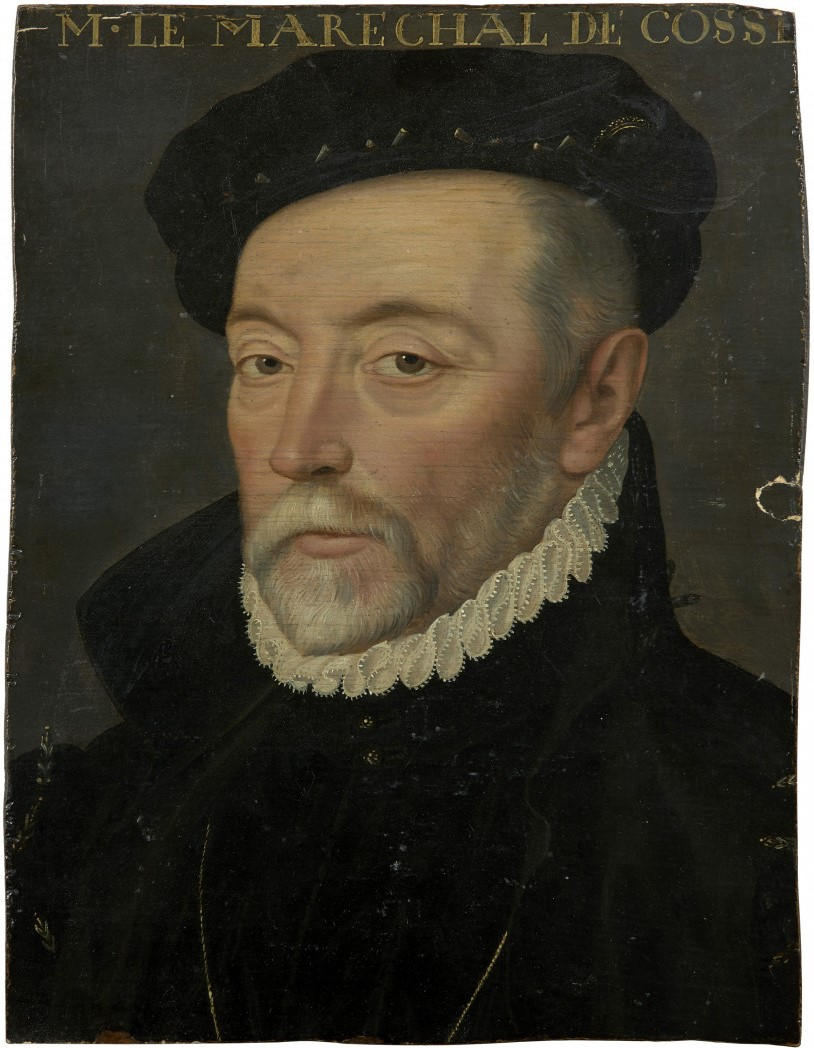
Seigneur de Gonnor, future marshal of France and second lieutenant-general of Paris during the civil war

During the war Paris would be entrusted first to the lieutenant-generalcy of the comte de Brissac in May, before being transferred to his brother, the seigneur de Gonnor a few months later. Both men worked to protect the capital against threats, and acted as intermediaries between the royal family and the administration of the city.

In May there was a scare that the Protestants were about to stage an attack on the capital, however it turned out to be a simple quarrel between some boatmen. Nevertheless, the Parisians had already chained the street in preparation for the attacks. On 28 May the cardinals de Guise and de Lorraine carried the Ciborium aloft in a procession through the city, every corner crowded with soldiers from Metz and Calais. Due to the fact the king had departed Paris, the remaining Protestants in the city were ordered to depart by Navarre within 48 hours on 26 May. He declared that their property was forfeit, which was met with delight in the capital. Those who chose to stay to protect their property or because they couldn't leave were ordered to convert or leave immediately. The rebaptism of a Protestant girl into the Catholic faith was attended by 10,000 Parisians. Book burnings were undertaken at the place Maubert, and the Catholic population enjoyed firebrand preaching from the cardinal de Lorraine. Lorraine chose a sermon which affirmed the real presence while the Papal nuncio stood by. Processions against heresy were undertaken. In June, the Paris parlement undertook to receive confessions of Catholic faith from all its judges. 31 of the courts 143 members chose to absent themselves on the day that the public declaration of their Catholicism was to be made. While this doesn’t mean all 31 were necessarily Protestant, it was a not insignificant minority of the courts membership. Even among those who did not absent themselves, there were those who were suspected of Protestant sympathies, such as Christophe de Harlay. The université de Paris followed on from the example of the parlement in requiring oaths of Catholicism. After an incautiously worded declaration from the Paris parlement, vigilante killings began in July. Suspected Protestants were given mock trials and killed, or struck down in the street. For example, during the procession on the feast of the holy-innocents, an observer who made an incautious comment was murdered by those around them. The parlement revoked its edict and insisted on the following of regular legal channels. Houses that were not draped in tapestries were subject to looting.

The violence was in part motivated by developments around Paris. When nearby Meaux was seized by the Protestants, it fueled paranoia that the city’s food supply would be cut off. Measures were taken to ease potential food shortages. It was now ordered that even Protestants who had converted to Catholicism were to leave the city, searches were undertaken for arms. The prisons of Paris filled with religious prisoners, so much so that they could not be fed and began to starve in the petit châtelet. Some arrests were undertaken solely to protect individuals from the wrath of crowds.

On 28 January a gunpowder store detonated in the arsenal. It caused significant damage to the surrounding houses, and as a crowd gathered to look at the damage word spread that the explosion had been set off by the Protestants. Before the arrival of Marshal Montmorency the crowd had killed at least one. Another several would be killed the following day.

== Provence ==
Civil War in Provence and the Comtat Venaissin: Red markers indicate those settlements that were occupied by Protestant rebels at some point during the War. Blue markers indicate control either by the comte de Tende or Sommerive. An orange highlight indicates town was owned by the Principality of Orange. A yellow highlight indicates town was owned by the Papal States

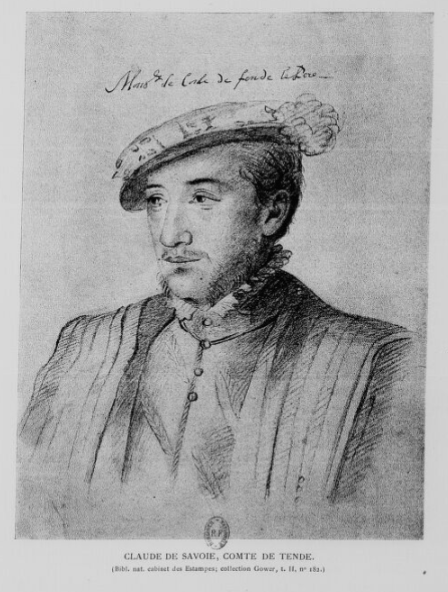
Comte de Tende, governor of Provence

In Provence, the governor the comte de Tende was not openly Protestant, but was at least sympathetic to Protestantism. His second son the comte de Cipierre and second wife Françoise de Foix-Candalle were both openly Protestant. In opposition to the governor and the comte de Crussol, the seigneur de Flassans who had been pushed out of Aix destroyed a royal company and pillaged the countryside around the city. In early March Tende was able to defeat Flassans' forces, that had terrorised the Protestants of Provence during 1561. Flassans was driven out of Provence by a combined army of Tende and Mauvans. Flassans’ defeat came despite the 500 reinforcements he had received. Tende, Mauvans and Crussol sacked the Flassans stronghold of Barjols on 6 March. Tende did not approve of the massacre that followed, and entrusted his son in law Jacques de Cardé with stopping the violence. Flassans himself was able to escape the slaughter of his men. He fled to the Île de Porquerolles. In the wake of the massacre of Barjols, Crussol's commission was challenged at the court on the grounds of his Protestant sympathies.

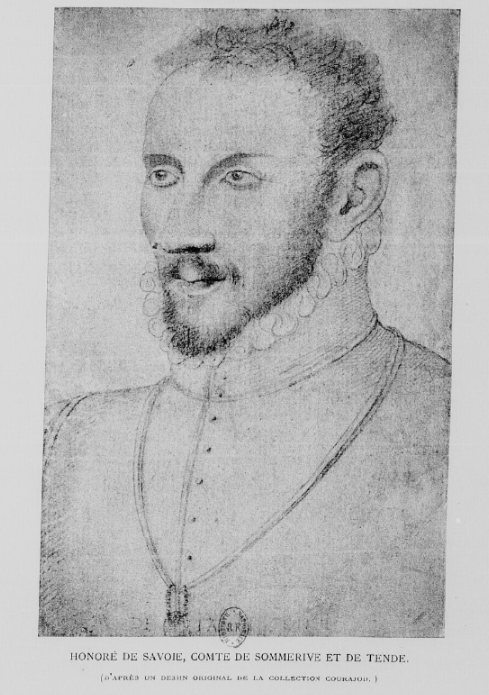
Seigneur de Sommerive, son of the comte de Tende who led a Catholic third party in Provence as a counter-governor

After the defeat of Flassans, Flassans' brother, the comte de Carcès recruited Tende's eldest son who had remained Catholic to the radical cause. Therefore, in May his eldest son, the lieutenant-general of Provence, the seigneur de Sommerive declared himself in rebellion against his father. He wrote a letter to his father announcing this decision as his 'very humble, very obedient, and very sorry son and servant'. Sommerive secured the rallying of the majority of the important city governors of Provence in opposition to the comte de Tende. Tende had raised levies, but was soon forced to disband them due to his inability to pay them. The disbanded troops spread out as gangs attacking Protestants across Provence. Tende wrote mournfully to Catherine bemoaning how divided the province was. In Aix, the Protestant members of the garrison disrupted a Catholic procession by throwing grains into the path it was to take, causing injury to the bare footed pilgrims. Tende was unable to prevent the Catholic counterstroke, which was to massacre the Protestants of the city, even when he appealed to the parlement in the city. Six of those parlementaires who had supported the registration of the edict of Saint-Germain fled the city, while the seventh was murdered. The parlement chose to recognise Sommerive as the governor of the province. Sommerive declared the arrière ban, raised taxes and announced that his father was a captive of the Protestants, making his orders null. Both Aix and Marseille fell under his control, and he received troops from the Papal States. Catholic successes began in Provence earlier than they did in the rest of the south. Thus it was on 6 June that Orange was recaptured from the Protestants by a combined force of Carcès in alliance with the Papal commander Fabrizzio Serbelloni. The capture was accompanied by a bloody series of reprisals. Naked corpses of raped women were hanged from trees, and pages of the gospel were stuffed into the mouths of the dead. The violence was largely undertaken irrespective of religion, the Papal army butchering both Catholics and Protestants. In response to this coup, having been informed by Provençal Protestants of the Papal brutality, the baron des Adrets invaded the Papal States in July. Alongside Carcės, Sommerive then proceeded to drive Tende from the province, forcing him into exile in Savoy. The Protestants would take refuge in Sisteron during September. When put to siege by the Catholic forces, the comte de Cipierre would face off against his elder brother Sommerive. Sisteron fell to the Catholic forces that same month. Its fall would see brutal reprisals carried out against those inside the town including further instances of sexual violence.

=== Aix ===
By July some of the consuls that had been purged by the commissioners were reinstated to their charges. This process was completed in September, with Flassans returning to his office.

=== Mornas ===
After the Protestant capture of Mornas by a force under the command of Montbrun on 8 July, the defenders of the city would be massacred, their corpses put into the river with a sign which urged the people of Avignon to let the corpses pass as they had 'paid the toll' of Mornas.

=== Noves and Saint-Rémy ===
Crussol's troops in Provence which were stationed at Noves and Saint-Rémy were accused of mistreating the towns priests and elements of the population. Crussol responded to reports of this behaviour by ordering his captain at Saint-Rémy to respect the people of the town.

== Guyenne ==
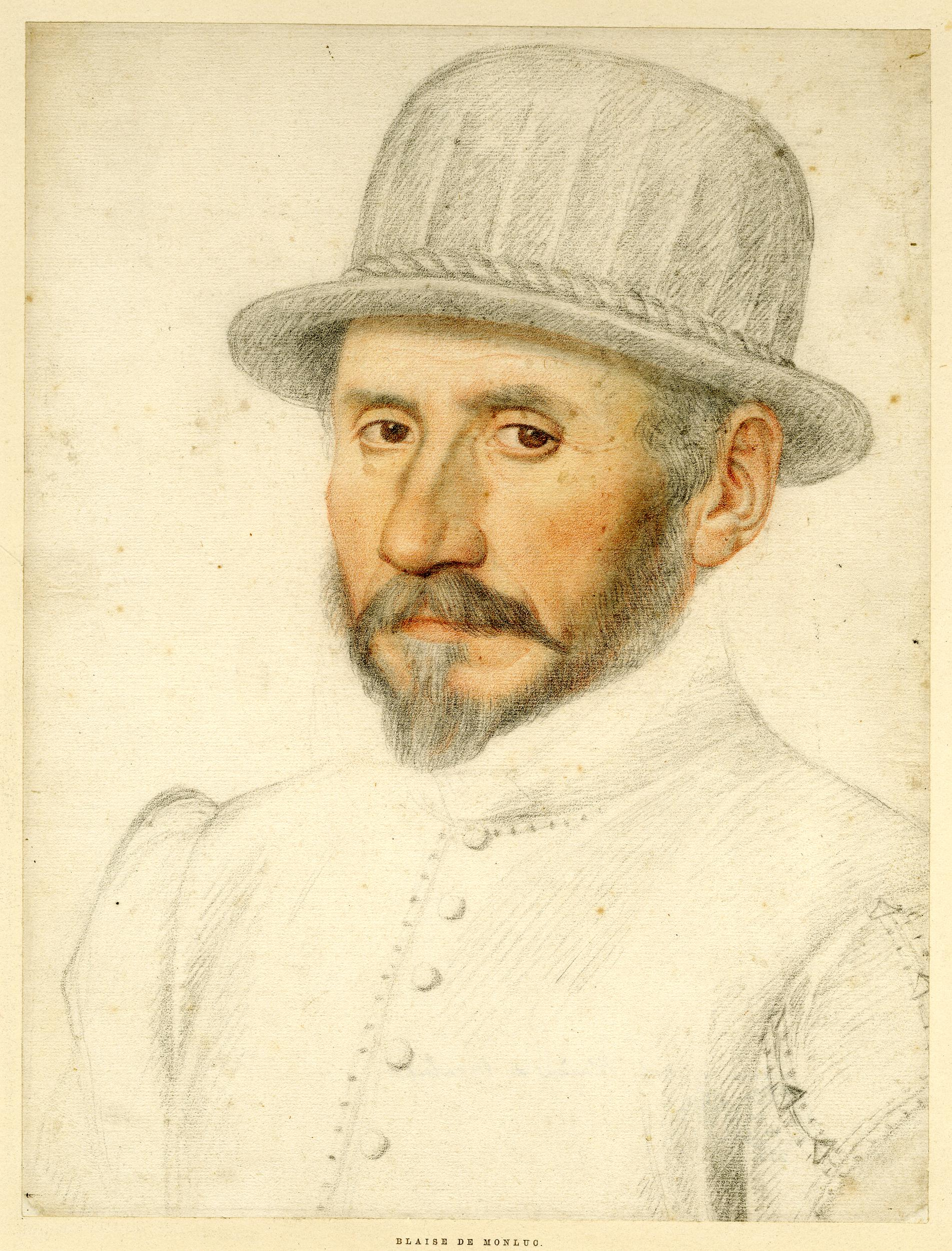
Seigneur de Monluc, future marshal and lieutenant-general of Guyenne, leader of the resistance to the Protestants in Guyenne

Civil War in Guyenne and Poitou: Red markers denote settlements that were occupied for some period of the war by rebel Protestants. Blue markers denote settlements that were royalist throughout the war. Green markers denotes the neutral Protestant party that didn't affiliate with Condé's rebellion. Orange highlight denotes failed rebel Protestant coup attempt.

In Guyenne, Condé entrusted the seigneur de Duras as his deputy. Initially the wave of Protestant urban seizures completely overwhelmed the Catholic commander Monluc. He marched towards Montauban only for it to defect to the Protestants, he then heard that Agen was also with the rebels. He moved then towards Villeneuve d'Agen and Port-Sainte-Marie, finding similar situations in both. Monluc, a man of pitched battles, had to adapt to the new style of warfare by urban coup. Only Bordeaux stood for the king in Guyenne.

=== Monluc's campaigns ===
In April 1562, the Catholic commander and future Marshal of France Blaise de Monluc took Villefranche at the request of Cardinal d'Armagnac, by this means Catholic worship was re-established in the city’s churches. Viewing the local authorities as insufficiently harsh he intervened to have several hanged from the town hall windows. In the summer of 1562, Monluc began a campaign against the queen of Navarre in southern France. Unlike the royal court, he recognised the danger of the Albret dynasty with their deep ties and connections in the south.

Navarre had learned of the iconoclasm that had transpired during his wife's stay in Vendôme on 21 May and was furious. His immediate plan was for Charles to have her lands handed over to him and for her to be sentenced to life imprisonment. Having established herself in Pau a secretary was despatched south to her by Navarre. Navarre was aware Philip would want the annexation of Navarre to be accomplished legally. This secretary brought with him a procuration allowing Navarre to trade her rights to the kingdom of Navarre for a new kingdom Navarre was to gain from the Spanish in Sardinia. Navarre was informed of the great wealth of Sardinia, abundant in pasture and cities. With royalist troops in Guyenne, and the Spanish to her back, the queen of Navarre signed, though included a secret disclaimer allowing her to re-open the discussion at a later date. The declaration would never be delivered to the king of Navarre prior to his death regardless. The king of Navarre meanwhile instructed Monluc to see to his wife's capture, but Monluc was unable to intercept her before she reached her seigneurial lands in Béarn.

Monluc developed a reputation for brutality. Protestant pastors and laymen were summarily executed under his orders either by being hanged or thrown into wells. The commander bemoaned that the poor state of his soldiers pay forced him to ransom prisoners as opposed to executing them all. For Monluc the brutality was a necessary part of warfare given the risks that faced royal authority in times of rebellion.

Monluc aided in the preservation of Toulouse and Bordeaux for the royalist cause. As concerned Toulouse he had been able to prevent Protestant reinforcements under the seigneur de Lanta and Arpajon from making it to the city. He had hurried to Bordeaux in early June to provide support for the seigneur de Burie who was having difficulty holding the city. On route to Bordeaux he was told by a representative of the queen of Navarre that the situation in the city was fine, and that she had left France to her sovereign lands to cool tensions. This left Monluc in a difficult position, unsure whether the court would approve of an aggressive attitude towards the queen's territories. On 3 July he captured Castelvieux with the support of Spanish forces who would be a continual asset to him during his campaign. In August he took Monségur and had the garrison executed, including a captain he had served with in the Italian Wars. He also captured Penne during this month. This was followed with the capture of Terraube in September during which a general slaughter of the population was undertaken, the bodies thrown into the well. On 9 September, Réalville fell to him. Monluc then recaptured Bergerac, Sainte-Foy and Lectoure (2 October), which had been taken by the Protestants. His conquests were accompanied by hundreds of deaths. In Bordeaux, he installed his protégé Tilladet who took charge of the town's Catholic league (which dated back to 1560) and allied with a league under the comte de Candalle later during the war.

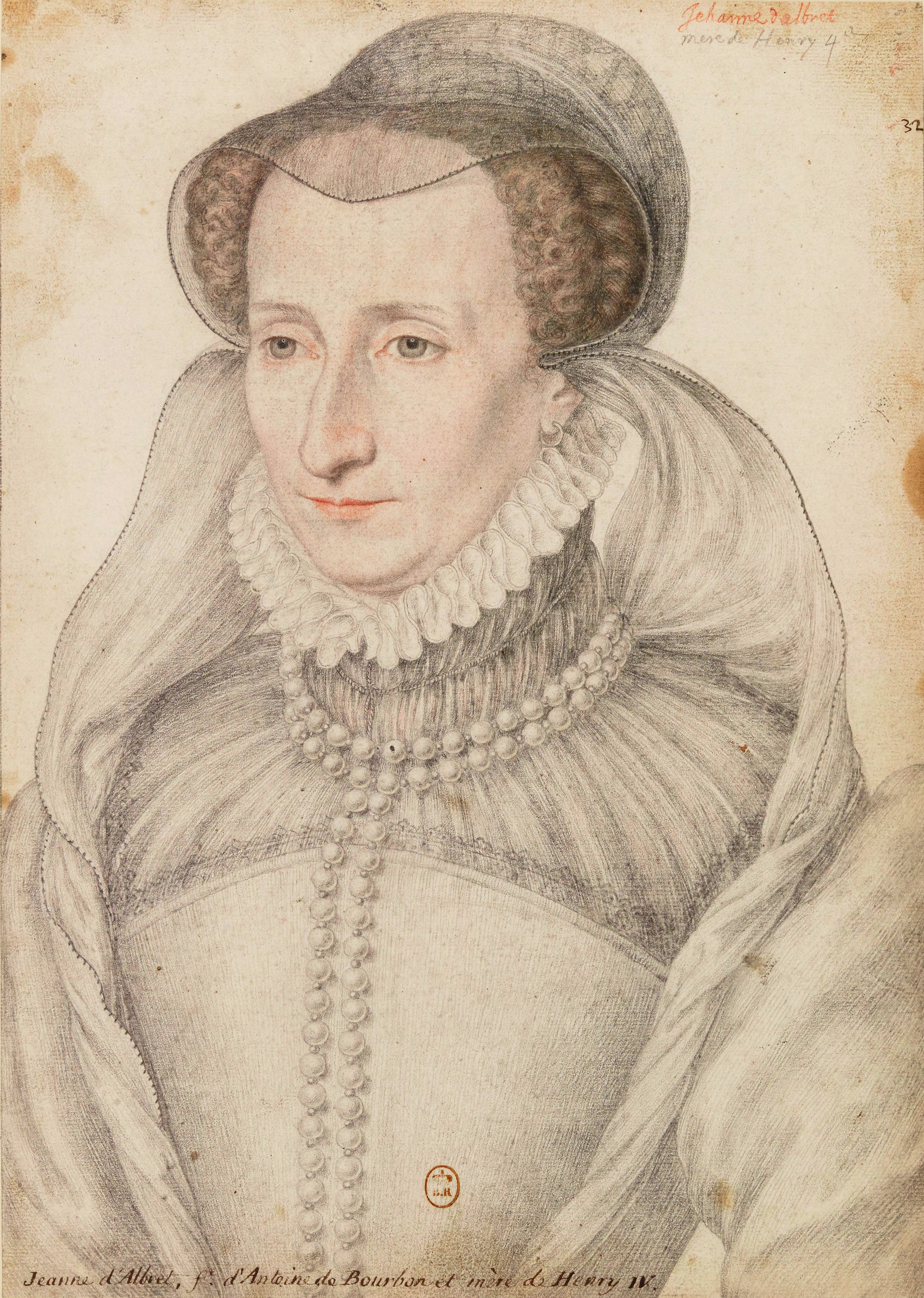
Queen of Navarre and fervent Protestant who maintained a technical neutrality during the first French War of Religion

Monluc was kept from invading Navarre's sovereign lands by Catherine, on the understanding that the queen of Navarre would maintain a technical neutrality in the conflict. From his base at Agen, Monluc therefore focused his attentions in the south against local Protestant forces. The local Protestant commander Duras who commanded around 4,000 soldiers was advised by the queen of Navarre to retire to Orléans. Though she framed this in correspondence with Catherine as evidence of her desire for peace, it conformed with the rebel strategy for forces to be concentrated at Orléans. Duras ignored the advise to proceed to Orléans and instead made an assault on Bordeaux which failed. After this he decided to hunker down at Montauban, the final major city held by the Protestants in Guyenne with his consolidated force of around 8,000 men. Catherine was not idle however, and re-installed Monluc and the local sénéchaux with military authority over the Albret lands of Armagnac and Foix. The queen of Navarre's bishops were warned they would forfeit their office if they did not return to Catholicism.

The presence of Spanish forces in Pamplona and Fuenterrabia served to dissuade another Protestant commander, the seigneur de Grammont, who headed Gascon infantry from proceeding north to join with Condé.

With orders to rendezvous with Condé, Duras began to make the way north. Monluc first fought the Protestants in a battle from 5–8 October on the Dordogne with the support of a Spanish contingent under don Carbajal. On 9 October Monluc intercepted the Protestant army of Duras at the Battle of Vergt in the Périgord and came out the victor. Duras lost about 1,400 men in the battle and his army was prevented from unifying with the main Protestant force. Thompson attributes the Protestant defeat at the battle of Dreux to the battle of Vergt. La Rochefoucauld took the battered remnants of Duras' force north to Orléans. After his departure from towns in the Périgord Monluc endeavoured to leave in his wake leagues of gentleman to assume military control and protect against any counter-attack.

Though the defeat of Duras left him uncontested in Guyenne, Monluc recognised that there was the potential for the conflict to be rekindled through outside encouragement, which he primarily saw as emanating from the queen of Navarre. He was keen to invade her sovereign lands to assure himself of victory but her technical neutrality prevented this, therefore he re-established himself at Agen where he could maintain a watch over the south. Monluc was established as the lieutenant-general of Guyenne in December for his victory at Vergt, dividing the great province with the seigneur de Burie. Monluc was given authority over Bordeaux and Agen, while Burie maintained authority over the territories to the east of the river Lot.

All was not militarily settled in Guyenne however. His appointment was a temporary one until such time as the young prince de Béarn should reach adulthood. Monluc's hegemony over Guyenne was then challenged militarily. The Protestant captain Armand de Clermont seized first Mussidan in January 1563 and then reconquered Bergerac for the Protestant cause in March of that year. The queen of Navarre meanwhile looked to the seigneur d'Audaux to lead her military efforts.

=== Bordeaux ===
The Protestants failed to bring Bordeaux into their fold. In Bordeaux, it was the seigneur de Burie who was tasked by the secrétaire d'État de Fresne to rally the local nobility, protect Bordeaux and prevent local Protestants from reinforcing Condé.

In May the parlementaires undertook an investigation of the premier présidents residence on suspicion there were arms stored there, however none were found.

On 26 June a Protestant force attempted to conquer the château de Trompette on the north east of the curtain wall system of Bordeaux. The château-Trompette was one of the two major fortifications that protected Bordeaux, the other being the château du Hâ which faced westwards. The seigneurs de Duras, Pardaillan and Langoiran led the effort. They enjoyed the support of several of Burie's men who assured them the gates would be opened for them. As the captain of the château had recently married into the Pardaillan family, the attackers felt assured in his neutrality to their efforts, if not support. However the captain remained firm and the gates remained locked to the attackers, foiling their scheme.

There was a further disturbance in the parish of Saint-Rémy which Burie was forced to send his personal military force to suppress.

In the wake of these episodes, the Catholics on the parlement urged all officials to take an oath of their Catholicism. The parlements Catholic syndicate patrolled the streets at night. The Catholic governor of Bordeaux ordered a tax be imposed on the Protestants of the city to support three hundred Catholic soldiers. Burie objected arguing that all should contribute, and while this was conceded to, the Catholics would pay a lower sum and not be subject to the troops lodging in their houses.

By late July Burie had conceded to the existence of a syndicate, though he informed Monluc its only responsibility would be guarding the walls. Lagebâton, the premier président did not concede so easily and succeeded in bringing a majority of the parlement in opposing its formation a week later. Though the Catholic hardliners threatened to appeal to the crown, this threat was defused, and Burie brought on board for the abolition of the syndicate.

In December, the comte de Candalle came before the parlement of Bordeaux, and made an appeal for the Catholics of the region to arm themselves and dispel the Protestants who would otherwise bring about the ruin of Catholicism.

Probably at the encouragement of Monluc, the seigneur de Merville, governor of Bordeaux, established a league for the sénéchausée of Guyenne. It was modelled on similar organisations established by the Protestants, with a multi-layered structure.

=== Conserans ===
The bishop of Conserans Hector d'Aussan raised a company of arquebusiers to defend his city from Protestant attacks. He led 4,000 men out of his city to confront a Protestant force during 1562. Protestants were unable to establish themselves in his diocese.

=== Agenais ===
Across the rest of the Agenais, Lectoure, Tonneins, Villeneuve and Nérac were conquered variously by the seigneur de Duras or the vicomte de Caumont. Condom resisted this Protestant tide, its lieutenant-sénéchal having armed the Catholic elite.

Monluc and Burie were both ordered to move their forces quickly to Bordeaux, however Monluc was petitioned by the nobility of the Agenais in May to not abandon them and he agreed to take them up on their request. Monluc informed the king of his intentions and then formed a military council and established six new commissions for military command beneath his authority. His forces assembled at Faudoas on 22 May.

=== Agen ===
On 17 April a Protestant force surprised Agen, with the gate being opened to them during the night. The leading militant Catholics of the city were all arrested, though one managed to escape to a nearby château. Seventeen churches and the cathedral were sacked and then usurped. Catholic worship was prohibited.

The recapture of Agen was accomplished by Monluc with little resistance in August, freeing the city’s radical Catholics. Monluc established Lalande as commander of the city and ordered the arrest of 1,000 Protestants over the coming months. Roughly 500 of the arrested would be hanged between the recapture of the city and the end of the war. By January 1563 the jurade of Agen had declared that all Protestant goods might be sold for the fortification of the city. The crown declared that all religious prisoners were to be freed if the Protestant military commanders put down their arms and came to negotiate with the royalists. This aroused the fury of the Catholic establishment in Agen through its failure to differentiate Catholics from Protestants. The jurade voted to bypass the crown and allow the confiscation of Protestant property.

== Auvergne ==
=== Le Puy ===
The Protestants of the Velay launched an attack on Le Puy. This was combined with an uprising inside the city, comprising around a 1/3 of the population of the city. The bishop of Le Puy, Antoine de Sennetaire was forced to flee from his diocese.

== Languedoc ==
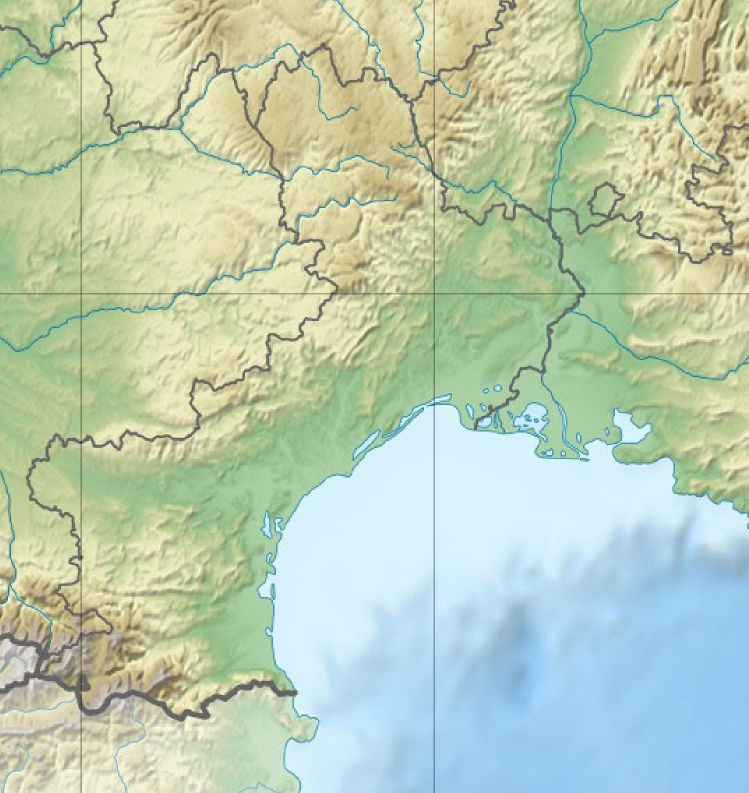
Civil War in Languedoc, locations with red markers were under rebel Protestant control at some point during the war, those with blue markers remained under royalist control. Orange highlight indicates failed Protestant coup

In Languedoc, Condé entrusted the sieur de Beaudiné as his lieutenant in the province. De Bèze had written to the province asking them to send men and arms to protect the King, his brothers, Catherine, and the princes on 16 March. In Bas-Languedoc Nîmes, Saint-Gilles, Montpellier, Orange, Beaucaire, Béziers and Agde all expelled the Catholic religion from their confines and embraced the Protestant rebellion. Meanwhile, in Haut-Languedoc, Montauban, Castres, Caussade, Réalville, Millau, Puylaurens, Saint-Antonin, Rabastens and Gaillac all defected. In the Cévannes and Vivarais, Aubenas, Privas, Annonay, Largentière, Tournon and Bourg-Saint-Andéol allied themselves with Condé's cause.

=== Crussol, Protestant governor of Languedoc ===
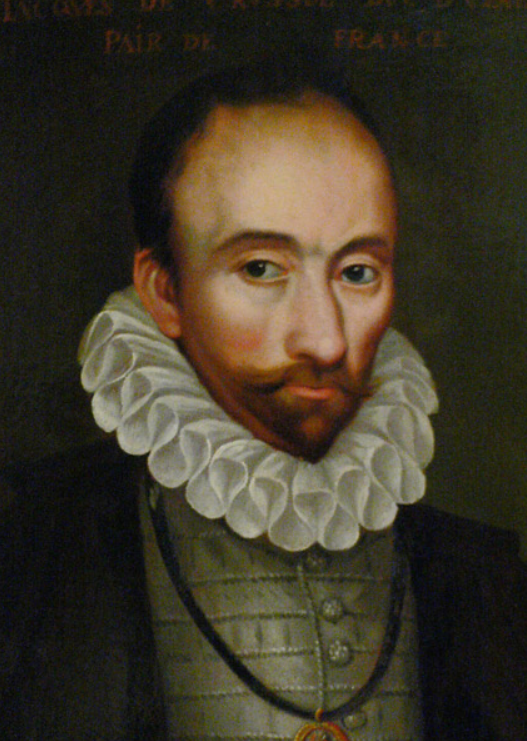
Sieur de Beaudiné (later known as the baron d'Acier and then duc d'Uzès) entrusted by Condé with leading the fight in Languedoc

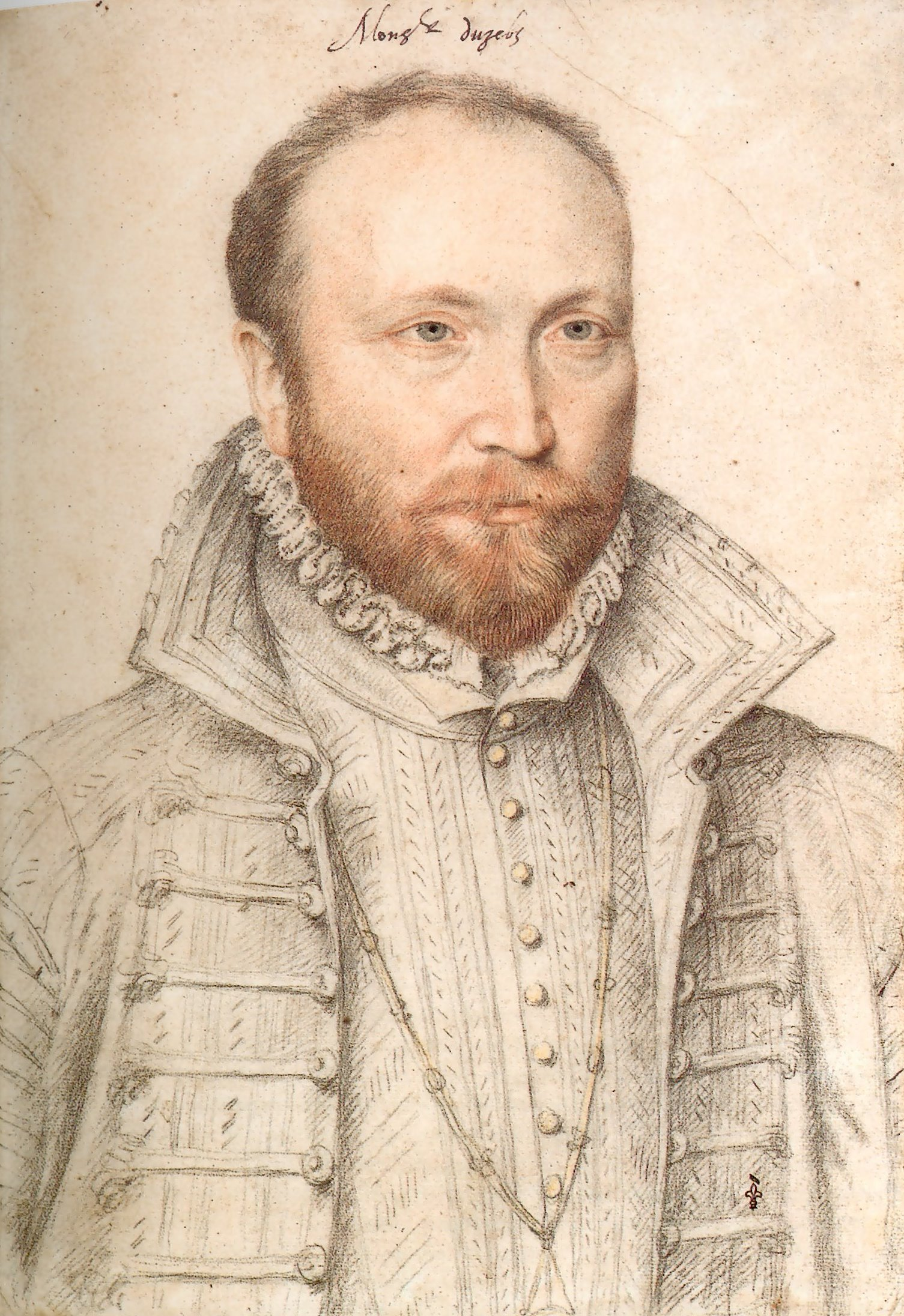
Comte de Crussol, elder brother of the sieur de Beaudiné who took up leadership of the Protestant rebellion in Languedoc in November

Crussol headed to Languedoc after defeating Flassans in Provence in early March arriving in the province in April. His efforts in the province were inhibited by the beginning of the civil war. He would soon be recalled to court by Catherine, the situation collapsing in his absence.

Having visited Orléans, Crussol retired to neutrality from the conflict on his estates. This was despite several appeals he received urging him to take the lead of the Languedoc Protestant cause. A number of consistories dispatched delegations to him through August to October urging him to follow this course of action without effect. Finally an appeal in November by the Estates assembled in Nîmes succeeded in rousing him to action. It chastised Crussol in intense language for allowing Protestant blood to be spilled, and urged him to show his loyalty to the king by championing the 'oppressed Protestants' of Languedoc and protecting them from 'foreign invasion'. Crussol responded that he would take up the cause due to his aspirations to see the king's subjects maintained in love for him, ensuring they were protected from foreigners. Crussol wrote to Catherine justifying his decision, highlighting the abuses of royal power that were being suffered. He did not frame himself as a defender of Protestantism, but rather royal authority. Nicoll highlights several further reasons for his decision to join the Protestant cause: a desire to protect his lands from attacks by Catholic nobles such as Saint-Vidal and prevent the damage to his honour by the assaults on his subjects.

The provincial Protestant estates assembled at the Crussol estates of Uzès on 11 November and declared that the comte de Crussol would be their governor of Languedoc. The nobility of the Vivarais and urban delegates from Uzès, Montpellier, Nîmes, Alès, Viviers, Beaucaire, Florac, Pont-Saint-Esprit, Bagnols, Béziers, Les Vans, Mende, Castres and Agde were party to the agreement. Beneath him would be a council of ten elected members, chosen by the Estates. Crussol would have the right to name subordinate governors, but only after they had been subject to the scrutiny of the Estates. He selected his brother Galiot de Crussol as his lieutenant-general and chose subordinate governors who were subsequently sent out to receive entries to their various charges. He selected his other brother the sieur de Beaudiné as the governor of Nîmes. The seigneur de Cournonterral was made lieutenant-general of the Vivarais while the baron de Peyre was made governor of the Gévaudan. Béziers and Bagnols also received new governors. Those he appointed needed approval of their Christian values from the Protestant church. The estates swore they would serve him with every drop of their blood. They offered him a subsidy of 400,000 livres to raise an army. Crussol for his part promised to protect Protestantism, and not tolerate Catholicism among his followers.

Crussol and the council beneath him engaged with the more local Protestant estates to ensure soldiers were paid and fed. For example, Cournonterral who he had established over the Vivarais participated in the local estates at Rochemaure. The body was requested to provide pay and munitions, and acceded to both requests. Money was raised through the seizure of Catholic assets, confiscation of Catholic and royal revenues, fundraising from the Protestant churches (over 300,000 livres was requested) and loans.

Crussol often served as the middleman between his military commanders across the province and the council. In more international plans the estates at Nîmes declared that they would establish a navy for the security of the province and work on improvements to the fortifications on the frontier specified by Crussol.

Crussol gained the right of authority over the Protestant church akin to that granted to the crown by the edict of Saint-Germain, with no synods to occur without either one of his officers or himself present. For the Catholics, it was felt preferable that they be exiled from the province rather than made to 'hypocritically convert'. The assembly of Rochemaure established a confession of faith all inhabitants were to uphold in November.

The assembly also took up the matter of those who affiliated with Protestantism out of a belief that they would no longer have to pay seigneurial dues and taxes. The assembly declared such people were 'libertines' who needed to be combatted with 'good justice' so that such seditions did not continue to spread. This did not mean the assembly was opposed to the people engaging in resistance however, and it was recognised that Protestantism was under attack and that all Protestants were therefore compelled to take up arms for their defence.

In December, Catherine wrote to Crussol, chastising him for taking up arms against the crown. She urged him to not forget the good favour she had shown him and capitulate for the Languedoc Protestants in a negotiated peace to the lieutenant-general of Languedoc Joyeuse. By this means she stated the Protestants could enjoy liberty of conscience.

Through January and February Crussol undertook the establishing of commissions in the hope of raising a new military force. It was alleged that this new force numbered around 6,000 men. Coligny boasted to Elizabeth that Crussol had almost succeeded in saving the entirety of Languedoc from tyranny.

A further meeting was undertaken at Bagnols from 31 March to 5 April 1563 with 25 nobles and 31 members of the Third Estate. The assembly had been planned for Montpellier but Crussol was on campaign in the Comtat Venaissin and therefore it had to be moved. While Crussol had received an unsigned version of the edict of Amboise that established peace, confirmation that peace had been established was not confirmed until after the assembly. Crussol himself was kept appraised of the assemblies progress. Therefore, this shadow administration was provisional in nature, predicated on the king being a minor. It was established by the assembly that no peace could be established until such time Languedoc was granted a Protestant governor and judicial system. The king was viewed as still potentially being in captivity. Several nobles were dispatched to court to remonstrate with the king on the matter of the peace. The alliance of the Protestant assemblies of Dauphiné, Languedoc and the Lyonnais under the 'protection of Crussol' was re-confirmed. The assembly bemoaned the paucity of funds for troops as many had been sent to Dauphiné, Nicoll hypothesises these were devoted to relief of the siege of Grenoble. Collected revenues were lower than had been projected, due to royalist control of some of the areas that were to be raised from, or alternatively protests that the country was now at peace. Money was advanced by the council to pay for German mercenaries from Lyon at considerable expense. Therefore, warnings were sent out urging towns and villages send money to the council or face Crussol's wrath. It was agreed there would be no further monetary impositions on Languedoc due to the poverty of the province, focusing on continued liquidation of Catholic church land and export duties. Crussol was urged by the assembly to see to the punishment of delinquent soldiers, through the publishing of military ordonnances. Attendance of mass was also felt to be a crime that needed a firmer hand.

=== Nîmes ===
The first exposure of Nîmes to the civil war that was to engulf France was when in late February a small Protestant force passed through the city and engaged in iconoclasm as they passed. On 18 March the judge Robert LeBlanc of the présidial court brought a message from Condé, Coligny and the comte de Crussol. He urged the Protestant consistory to remain peaceable, but to arm themselves if the Catholics armed themselves. By April the Catholic canons again departed Nîmes and Protestants began celebrating services inside the city again in defiance of the edict of Saint-Germain. The church bells were ordered melted down on 19 May and the Catholic silverware was sold off. The money was used to support Protestant troops.

In December, the new governor the Protestant sieur de Beaudiné staged his triumphant entry into Nîmes, the consuls lodged him in the abandoned bishop’s palace.

=== Carcassonne ===
In March, the Catholics of Carcassonne waited for the Protestants of their city to depart from the walls for their service, before locking the gates, and refusing them re-entry. This was despite the pleading of the Catholic relatives of the exiled Protestants inside the walls.

The estates of Languedoc met in December in Carcassonne. There was great fear among the royalist Catholic leadership that Duras and Crussol would hijack the estates. It was agreed among the radical Catholic grandees that Monluc would guard Toulouse in case the Protestants tried to use the estates as a distraction to attack the city. The estates proved firmly Catholic, demanding 300,000 livres towards the reclaiming of lost Catholic territories which would be raised through the seizure of Protestant property, a tax on Protestants in Toulouse and fines on those who failed to attend mass. The Carcassonne estates highlighted that they had met at royal instruction, and denounced the illegitimate assembly that had gathered at Nîmes under the guise of a meeting of the estates. All its rulings were declared to be void by the Carcassonne estates.

=== Montauban ===
The vicomte d'Arpajon was dispatched by Condé to raise troops in Montauban for the Protestant rebels, and he arrived during April. Monluc, alerted to what was going on, made towards Montauban to prevent his arrival. Alarmed, Protestant delegates of Montauban attempted to secure the support of their Toulousian co-religionists in their defence. Companies belonging to Monluc, the comte de Nègrepelisse, and the comte de Terride, alongside local gentleman from Toulouse and urban citizens of the surrounding area came to aid in Monluc's siege. Though there had been around 2,000 armed men when Monluc departed from Toulouse, by the time he arrived in front of Montauban on 20 May desertions had reduced his force to about 900, many of his men having been only interested in the 'defence of Toulouse' with little desire to be involved in a broader campaign. The consuls of Montauban had not however been idle, and their work on the defences of the city had left it one of the strongest defended places in France. Thus Montauban resisted Monluc's siege in May, Monluc struggling to keep his force in the field for more than a few weeks.

In September, the comte de Terride attempted his own siege of Montauban, but with a similar lack of success due to much the same issues as had plagued the first siege. He made another attempt from October to April to reduce the city, this time under the leadership of the lieutenant-general the cardinal d'Armagnac. Monluc was invited to participate, but only briefly visited the siege lines, before returning to Guyenne. Armagnac brought with him a new method of financing the siege so that it might last longer, a treasury supported from Toulouse. Toulousian parlementaires visited the siege lines so they could gauge the progress of the reduction efforts in December and Toulousian captains dominated the undertaking of the siege from November onwards, where prior it had been led by Gascon captains. The bourgeois of the city involved themselves in the provision of powder and carts of ammunition. Inside Montauban was a garrison of 2,000 soldiers under the command of the governor of Montauban, Nicolas Rapin. The Protestant minister of Montauban was also heavily involved in the defence of the city. He was experienced in fighting, having involved himself in the Savoyard Waldensian War of 1561 fighting against the duke of Savoy. Initially this garrison outnumbered the besiegers heavily, however the besiegers eventually brought to bear 1,500 infantrymen with support from mounted arquebusiers and ten pieces of artillery. Forts were occupied and constructed in the surrounding area in the hope of controlling access to Montauban, though they lacked control of the west of the city. On 17 October, the besieging force attempted to enter negotiations with the defenders, hoping to convince them to cease their resistance. For the besieged, the captain Laboria and the Protestant ministers participated, the latter strongly urging Laboria against any compromise or negotiation. Laboria presented a firm position to the besiegers that they were loyally defending the king's edicts. As October dragged on Laboria began to believe a negotiated peace was in the city’s best interest, but he was rebuked in this course by 7 of the 8 ministers of the city. A further parlay on 28 October saw a similarly resolute determination from the minister who accompanied Laboria. The ministers were alarmed at Laboria's attitude in this period and urged the council of Montauban to move against him. A reconciliation was brokered between Laboria and the ministers in which the governor agreed to continue to resist, however shortly thereafter he slipped out of the city. The baron d'Ambres successfully resupplied Montauban for the Protestants in late 1562. Armagnac was still besieging the city when word of the general peace arrived, and he informed the leaders of Montauban that he would withdraw his forces if the city submitted to the crown. As such, ultimately the siege, like the previous efforts would prove a failure.

=== Toulouse ===
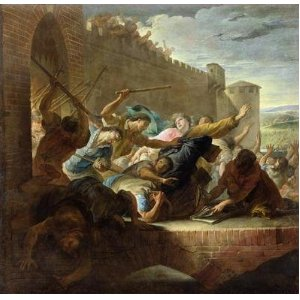
Expulsion of the Protestants of Toulouse

Toulouse was the seat of a parlement, and the local administration was strongly divided between the parlement which favoured persecution, and the urban government of the capitouls which had favoured the tolerant policy of the crown. The Toulousian parlement would later gain the reputation of being the "bloodiest tribunal in France" for its militant opposition to Protestantism. The capitouls were elected yearly from each of the eight capitoulates of Toulouse and were in Greengrass' estimation the most important office in Languedoc. The local Protestants saw optimistic prospects for a coup, as they had a strong minority population in the city, and in 1561 had enjoyed the fact that at least three of the four capitouls were Protestants while a fourth was sympathetic to the faith. The 1562 capitouls were less Protestant, with only two in the faith, while Greengrass argues another two may have begun to sympathise with the Protestants.

On 3 February the two sides met to resolve their differences. The capitouls protested the usurpation of their prerogatives over policing and security in the city by the judicial body. The parlementaires countered by highlighting the growing number of armed Protestant services required a greater policing presence. When the capitouls attempted to rebut this, several militant Catholic departed from the meeting, presenting the chair with an already signed remonstrance against the capitouls they had prepared days earlier. Soon thereafter a report was presented to the parlement illustrating how several capitouls had been attending an illegal Protestant service.

During Lent one of the guards assigned to protect the Protestants as they went to their worship outside Toulouse accidentally shot a Protestant in the head. On 2 April Catholics attempted to seize a body that was to be buried according to Protestant rites. The confrontation became violent, and required the intervention of the city guard. Several Protestants were killed in the riot. In the evening frustrated Protestants attempted to take the hôtel de ville but the crisis was defused with concessions to both sides. The Protestants would be allowed to maintain a guard of 200 (unarmed) men, and the Catholics a similar number led by four captains. The Catholic captains refused to allow themselves to be subordinated to the capitouls or to participate in house searches of Catholics. By the terms of the agreement all armed forces not above mentioned were to depart from the city, and the Catholics were further prohibited from ringing the tocsin. On 11 April the parlement had the condemned Catholics pardoned for their roles in the violence.

During April a colloquy was held by the Protestants, at which it was agreed not to join Condé's association. This greatly disheartened the delegates from Montauban, who were only reassured that if Montauban was attacked they would come to the city’s aid. Nevertheless, money would be sent to Condé in response to the appeal to the city from de Bèze. Covertly Protestant troops were also secreted into the city. In May the parlement declared the ban-et-arrière ban (noble military service) much to the indignation of the capitouls who objected to the assembling of soldiers in the city without their consent. On 10 May 200 Catholic nobles entered Toulouse under arms. These soldiers were not subject to the city’s municipal authority. A Protestant noble and capitoul of Toulouse, Pierre Hunault, the seigneur de Lanta, met with Condé in Orléans and promised him that Toulouse would be delivered to the Protestant rebels. The plan was to make copies of the keys and then seize the city with a combination of troops raised in the city and external forces from Lanta's estates in the Lauragais. However the plot was revealed to the parlement of Toulouse by Guise and Monluc and the city was thus put on alert. At a secret meeting it was agreed to advance the timetable of the coup as they already had troops in the city.

The Protestant rebels succeeded in seizing the hôtel de ville (in which three of the capitouls were present) and the colleges of Saint-Martial, Saint-Catherine and Périgord on the night of 11 May. Before dawn they assembled barricades of earth filled barrels in the quarters they had been able to secure. They were confronted by the parlementaires and Catholic citizens of Toulouse. The militant parlementaires were fairly easily able to convince their colleagues of the wisdom of their policy, and turned their chamber into a barracks and established an operations room led by several parlementaires. The parlementaires summoned Monluc, the baron de Terride, the comte de Nègrepelisse and the sénéchal of Toulouse Bellegarde to their aid. Monluc and Bellegarde made to attack a relief army while Nègrepelisse and Terride hurried to Toulouse, deploying their troops in the city. Four days of savage street fighting followed. The Catholics enjoyed the weight of numbers, with around 3–5,000 active fighters in comparison with 2,000 Protestant. The Protestants were however better armed due to the weapons they had smuggled in and the military supplies in the hôtel de ville. The Protestants attempted to employ cannons at several locations, however it was to limited effect. The fighting not only occurred above ground but also below, with Protestants in the sewers being flushed out into the Garonne. Both sides employed innovative guerrilla tactics for their advantage. On 15 May the Catholic forces in the city set an entire district of 200 houses ablaze. Four defensive wheeled wooden vehicles were deployed on this day to shield them from Protestant firepower. The Catholic preachers urged their flock to kill, promising them that they did it under the authority of their fathers. On the morning of the Saturday a truce was negotiated by which the remaining Protestants would be allowed to depart the city before the end of Sunday, no guarantee was given to their property or worship. It was an alliance of the common people and conseillers that maintained Toulouse for the royalist cause. The victorious Catholics quickly set about purging the administration of Toulouse of all Protestants. The majority of the surviving Protestants were allowed to depart Toulouse, however as they did they were harried by bands of peasants, and in the end more were killed beyond Toulouse's walls than inside. In total around 3,000-4,000 citizens of Toulouse were killed in the fight for the city. Breaking this down, a contemporary estimated around 200 Protestants died in the street fighting, in comparison with around 100 Catholics. Greengrass considers these figures too low. Around 200 or more Protestants would be hanged in effigy after the defeat. After the successful preservation of the city at minimum 120 were subject to execution, including one of the capitouls Adhémar Mandinelli who had his severed head nailed to the entrance to the hôtel de ville. His property was also forfeit. Those capitouls who had fled were subject to a 100,000 livres fine, eternal banishment from Toulouse and being hanged in effigy.

A Protestant company had been making its way from Montauban to support their co-religionists in the acquisition of Toulouse, however when it became apparent Terride and Charry's company were in the area, they retreated back to Montauban. In the wake of the attempted coup in Toulouse and its bloody suppression, hostilities erupted between royalists and Protestant rebels in Castres, Gaillac, Albi and the Comminges.

During the summer, the cardinal d'Armagnac arrived in Toulouse, where he had recently been made archbishop, and assumed the military powers of the lieutenant-generalcy of the sénéchaussée of Toulouse. In October, Armagnac wrote to the crown requesting the dispatch of reinforcements, highlighting that Toulouse might soon be attacked. The crown responded by asking Armagnac to enforce its recent truce proposal to de-escalate confessional tensions, with all the Protestants jailed in Toulouse to be freed. The Catholic leaders of Toulouse reacted with horror to this proposal, seeing it as 'madness' to allow 'defeated Protestant soldiers to be reunited with their compatriots in the field'. A request for exemption from the amnesty was refused.

Monluc arrived in Toulouse in December and worked towards the furtherance of Catholic military ascendency in the city, meanwhile elections were held for a new premier président of the parlement and the office of sénéchal. Bellegarde was re-elected over the sieur de Merville as sénéchal due to his role in aiding the crushing of the May uprising and his greater experience. In February 1563 Monluc and Armagnac oversaw the induction of Nègrepelisse and the baron de Fourquevaux into the Ordre de Saint-Michel (Order of Saint-Michel) at the Cathedral of Toulouse. That same month the parlement successfully gained permission to seize property from the Protestants who had 'caused unrest'. By this time, several of the capitouls who had fled after the May uprising had been reinstated by the crown. One of the restored capitouls attempted to filibuster Armagnac's new plan for the guard, but the parlement ordered Catholic troops to seize the keys to the gates from the hôtel de ville in March.

=== Puylaurens ===
After Crussol assumed military leadership of the rebel Protestant cause in Languedoc he ordered an attack on Puylaurens which was in royalist hands. The town was thus captured. Bourg-Saint-Andéol, Aramon and Bédarieux were also captured towards the end of 1562.

=== Lavaur ===
Lavaur was attacked by a Protestant force that had sortied from Montauban. According to Monluc, the Protestants pillaged Lavaur and established themselves in the city, receiving those who had fled from Toulouse.

=== Castres ===
A Protestant conspiracy was devised in Castres to secure the city. Secret discussions were undertaken for the capture with gentleman both within and without Castres walls to seize the city when word came from Crussol. Crussol gave his approval for the seizure of Castres and imprisonment of Catholic hostages. The coup caught the Catholics entirely off guard and the cathedral was burned.

The Protestant commander in Castres, the sieur de Ferrières oversaw the capture of Roquecourbe and settlements in the Montagne Noire.

As late as 2 April, Protestant soldiers from Castres undertook a sortie alongside troops from Puylaurens that saw the capture of Buzet which afforded access to the capital of Quercy.

=== Annonay ===
The Protestants seized control of Annonay during the summer. In October the royalist commander Saint-Chamond recaptured the town, putting it to a sack during the recapture. A Protestant assembly at Baix that same month resolved on the importance of recapturing Annonay and to this end Crussol's lieutenant-general for the Vivarais, Saint-Martin was given a commission in December. Saint-Martin brought Annonay back into the rebel Protestant fold and oversaw the repairing of the walls and fortification of the gate. Nemours ordered Saint-Chamond to capture the town again, and he returned with a sizable force during Saint-Martin's absence towards the start of January, completely destroying the walls and gate. The town would remain in royalist hands going forward.

=== Montpellier ===
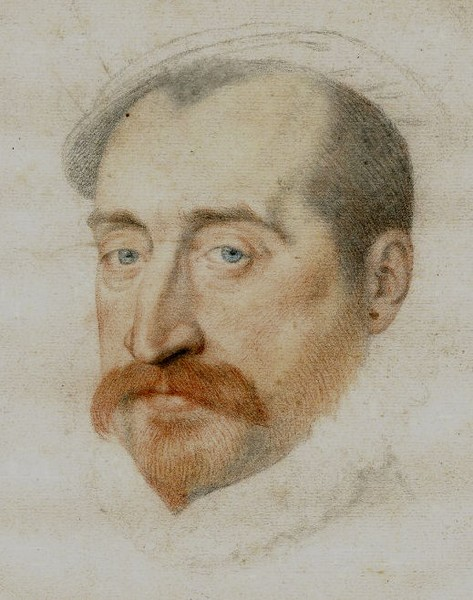
Vicomte de Joyeuse, lieutenant-general in Languedoc who fought for the royalists

In Montpellier the cathedral and bishops palaces were burned. Further, the bishops lands were sacked. A Protestant receveur was established to undertake leases of the ecclesiastical land for the diocese of Montpellier, and they issued 78 leases. However many of them would fall into arrears. Antoine de Rapin was established as the governor of Montpellier.

Montmorency tasked Joyeuse with recapturing Montpellier for the royalist cause with an army of Provençal and Italian soldiers. However, the campaign would be a failure and Joyeuse retired to Pézenas. Joyeuse would find success in an assault on Limoux which succeeded in recapturing the town sometime before August. A second siege of Montpellier would be combatted by Crussol, who dispatched the baron d'Ambres to relieve the city, a task which he successfully accomplished. Montpellier complained to Crussol in December that nearby towns were not paying for military companies, forcing Montpellier to shoulder the burden. It was requested that the benefitting towns reimburse the city. They further asked that payment be given for their ministers and a college. Crussol and the conseil denied the request and requested Montpellier fund such things from its own citizenry. Having heard reports of sedition in Montpellier, Crussol dispatched a member of the Languedoc council to the city to solve matters. That same month, Crussol relieved Rapin from his command of the city. The consuls of Montpellier protested that they now had neither captain nor troops to defend them. A delegation was sent to Crussol praising Rapin, and asking that if he not be reassigned that a similarly god-fearing replacement must be found. They similarly requested that 500-600 troops be provided for the town at the province’s expense. Therefore, the sieur de Péyrault was chosen for Montpellier, with Crussol informing Montpellier on 30 January 1563. No extra troops were provided as the consuls had requested. In March the failure of Montpellier to provide the financial support to German mercenaries in Lyon that was requested led to the arrest of the city’s consuls for 1562. After this stern measure, the administration attempted again to raise the funds for Crussol.

=== Béziers ===
In November, garrisons were established by Crussol around Béziers for the purpose of frustrating the royalist lieutenant-general Joyeuse. In early 1563 settlements continued to be captured around Béziers by the Protestants.

The former governor of Montpellier, Rapin was moved with his troops to Béziers by Crussol. In January Crussol received a plea for aid from Béziers as unpaid soldiers were getting rowdy. Governor Rapin was absent on campaign. Thus Crussol sent a captain 'La Grille' in February to re-establish order. Further men would be sent to resolve tensions in the city during February. Lack of pay continued to endanger the town’s security into March and according to the Histoire Ecclésiastique were it not for the captains closing the gates, soldiers may have abandoned Béziers. Rapin would again be reassigned to a new charge, becoming governor of Castres.

=== Saint-Gilles ===
On 25 September Catholic forces from Arles captured Saint-Gilles. This was unacceptable to the Protestant leadership of Nîmes, who could not tolerate a Catholic outpost so near to their city, as such they dispatched a force to retake Saint-Gilles. Two days later on 27 September a Protestant force seized Saint-Gilles and massacred the Catholics of the town, including women and children. The force from Arles was caught on the banks of Rhône as it tried to withdraw, and was cut down.

=== Lauzerte ===
When Lauzerte was stormed by the forces of the Protestant seigneur de Duras the town was subject to a massacre. According to the Protestant Histoire Ecclésiastique 567 people of the town were killed, among them 194 priests.

=== Albi ===
Headquartering his operations at Albi, the archbishop of Albi coordinated royalist military efforts as lieutenant-general of the Albigeois. Striking out from Albi, the archbishop oversaw the capture of Gaillac and châteaux in the Tarn valley. His troops collaborated with a local labourer to undertake a massacre in the town.

=== Rabastens ===
In response to the royalist Catholic massacre at Gaillac the rebel Protestants undertook a massacre of Catholics at Rabastens.

=== Gévaudan ===
In November, the comte de Crussol established garrisons across the Gévaudan in the hopes of frustrating the Catholic commander Jacques d'Apchier who operated in the region.

=== Mende ===
It would be a Protestant minister from the Gévaudan who acted as the Protestant captain that oversaw the capture of Mende in July. Once the town was conquered, he set to work administering the town with the support of several others.

== Foix ==
The royalist governor of Foix, the seigneur de Pailhès made efforts to reconquer the capital of the province from the Protestants, it having only recently been seized. Failing in this he was equally unsuccessful in his various efforts to subdue the Protestant held city of Pamiers.

In March 1563, Protestants orchestrated a massacre of Catholics in Pamiers.

== Dauphiné ==
Civil War in Dauphiné: All marked towns were held by the rebel Protestants during the war. Those with blue marks were sovereign territories. Orange highlight indicates town belonged to the Principality of Orange. Yellow highlight indicates town belonged to the Papal States

The lieutenant-general of Dauphiné, La Motte-Gondrin, earned the antipathy of the provinces Protestant population when he oversaw the execution of a pastor and Protestant seigneur of Romans. He had, with a band of gentleman, also slaughtered a rural Protestant congregation of around 60 persons.

=== Adrets' campaigns ===
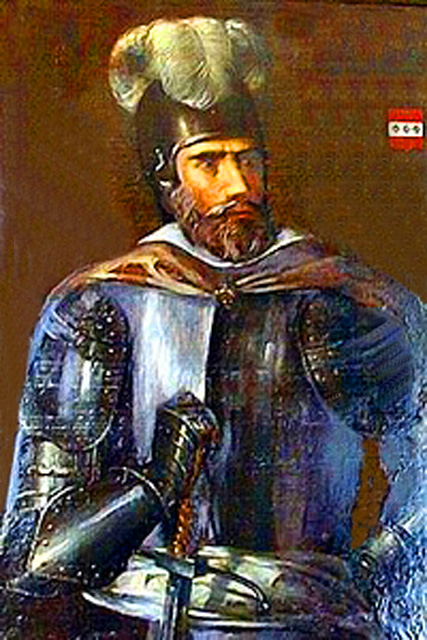
Baron des Adrets, Protestant commander in the Dauphiné until his defection in January 1563

Valence (27 April), Romans, Gap, Die and Vienne all fell to the Protestant cause of Condé between the months of March and May 1562. After the assassination of La Motte-Gondrin, the new lieutenant-general Maugiron found himself at a loss as to where in his province to even base his command. Leadership of the rebel cause was taken up by the baron des Adrets. Adrets came to affiliate with the opposition to the Guise in part due to a feud he had with the vidame d'Amiens for his actions during the Italian Wars that resulted in Adrets' capture. Amiens was a client of Guise's. The rebel Protestant baron des Adrets, who was renowned for his brutality, had great skill in the manoeuvre of his forces rapidly during the campaign. He wrote to Catherine assuring her of his loyalty to the crown, and promising to come to the capital to free her and her son. In every town that fell to Adrets, Catholicism was outlawed. He forced the garrisons of Pierrelatte, Saint-Marcellin and Montbrison to jump from the walls of the town or cliffs after their capture, as part of efforts to instill terror in his opponents. In one town of Forez eighteen prisoners were thrown from the tower in July. On 13 May Calvin wrote to Adrets urging him to exercise greater control over the crimes of his soldiers, so that they might pillage less. When Adrets captured Montélimar, the murder of the garrison was accompanied by cries expressing that it was revenge for the Papal brutalities in Orange. During his campaign in Provence, he captured Valréas (where he bested in battle the comte de Suze on 25 July), Sorgues and Cavaillon and then prepared to march on Avignon.

Among the Protestant leadership of Condé and Coligny Adrets was not a popular commander. Condé replaced him as governor of Lyon with the sieur de Soubise, meanwhile Coligny criticised Adrets in letters to Soubise. Coligny's letters to Soubise were intercepted and published by the Catholics. Feeling betrayed by his superiors Adrets increasingly moved towards dealings with the Catholic army of the duc de Nemours that he was in theory opposing. In December he drew up a truce plan for Dauphiné by which the province would recognise the authority of Nemours under whom Adrets would serve as lieutenant with powers in his absence. All Dauphinois Protestants would enjoy freedom of conscience in their homes, but ministers would be expelled from the province. The Protestant provincial estates, assembled at Montélimar met to consider these terms, with the Protestant ministers present strongly opposed them. Ultimately Adrets' peace plan was defeated.

The assembly at Montélimar further made attendance of Protestant services mandatory and subjected the entire population to ecclesiastical discipline. Political authority was reserved for those who had been Protestant for at least six months. Unrepentant Catholics were to be banished. Games of chance, 'profane songs' and blasphemy were all prohibited, with the latter subject to corporal punishment. There were to be two councils, the conseil de guerre (war council) and conseil politique (political affairs council). The latter would decide the wage of Adrets and other military leaders. Adrets was not to enter into any accord with the royalists without approval from the conseil de guerre. Military ordonnances issued by Adrets and Coligny were to be followed. A levy of 60,000 livres was made with a further 30,000 livres to be loaned. Catholic revenues would be seized, with the benefices rented out.

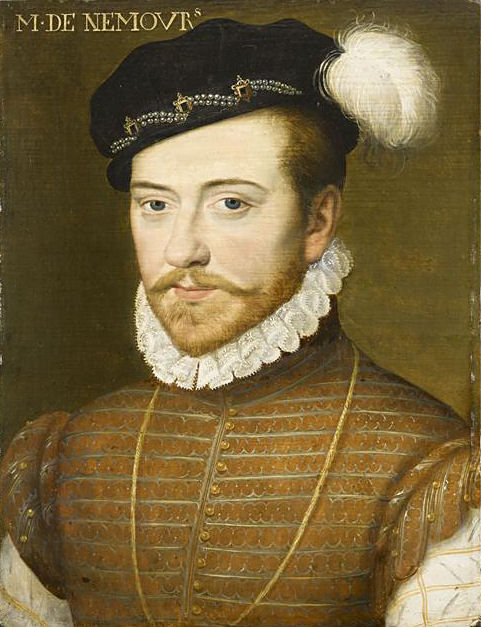
Duc de Nemours, governor of the Lyonnais upon Saint-André's death, who attempted to bring about Adrets' defection

In January 1563, Adrets' dealings with Nemours became too much and he was arrested by his subordinates Montbrun and Mauvans. He was alleged to have planned to betray Lyon to the royalists. He was held in captivity in Nîmes. Adrets would be replaced by the sieur de Soubise as the leader of the Protestant war efforts in the Lyonnais. In the later civil wars, Adrets would fight for the crown and Catholic cause.

=== Crussol's charge ===
In a further development in January, Crussol was made leader of Protestant Dauphiné in Adrets' stead, being elected commander during an assembly at Valence in January. The conseil de guerre was to advise him in all matters of war and follow his commands faithfully. Crussol was to inform the conseil politique of any appointments he made (for governors or captains of towns), and was granted a salary of 6,000 livres a year. All able bodied men were to be involved in the war effort, with nobles leviable at Crussol's discretion, requiring permission to rest neutrally on their estates. Crussol convoked an assembly in February to decide Adrets' fate.

Meanwhile, Crussol appointed Montbrun with authority over the Valentinois and Diois while the seigneur de Saint-Auban was elevated over the territory from Montélimar to the Comtat Venaissin. The maintenance and expansion of fortifications and troop payments were the responsibility of the overall administration. A further loan of 20,000 livres was to be made. Those who pillaged churches or took clerical revenues illegally would be subject to punishment from the Protestant apparatus. Such actions denied funds to the administration and would be difficult to explain to the king. Anabaptists and those who called for the abolition of feudalism were to be subject to punishment. Council meetings were not to take place during Protestant services and all days except Sunday were to be devoted to work.

=== Valence ===
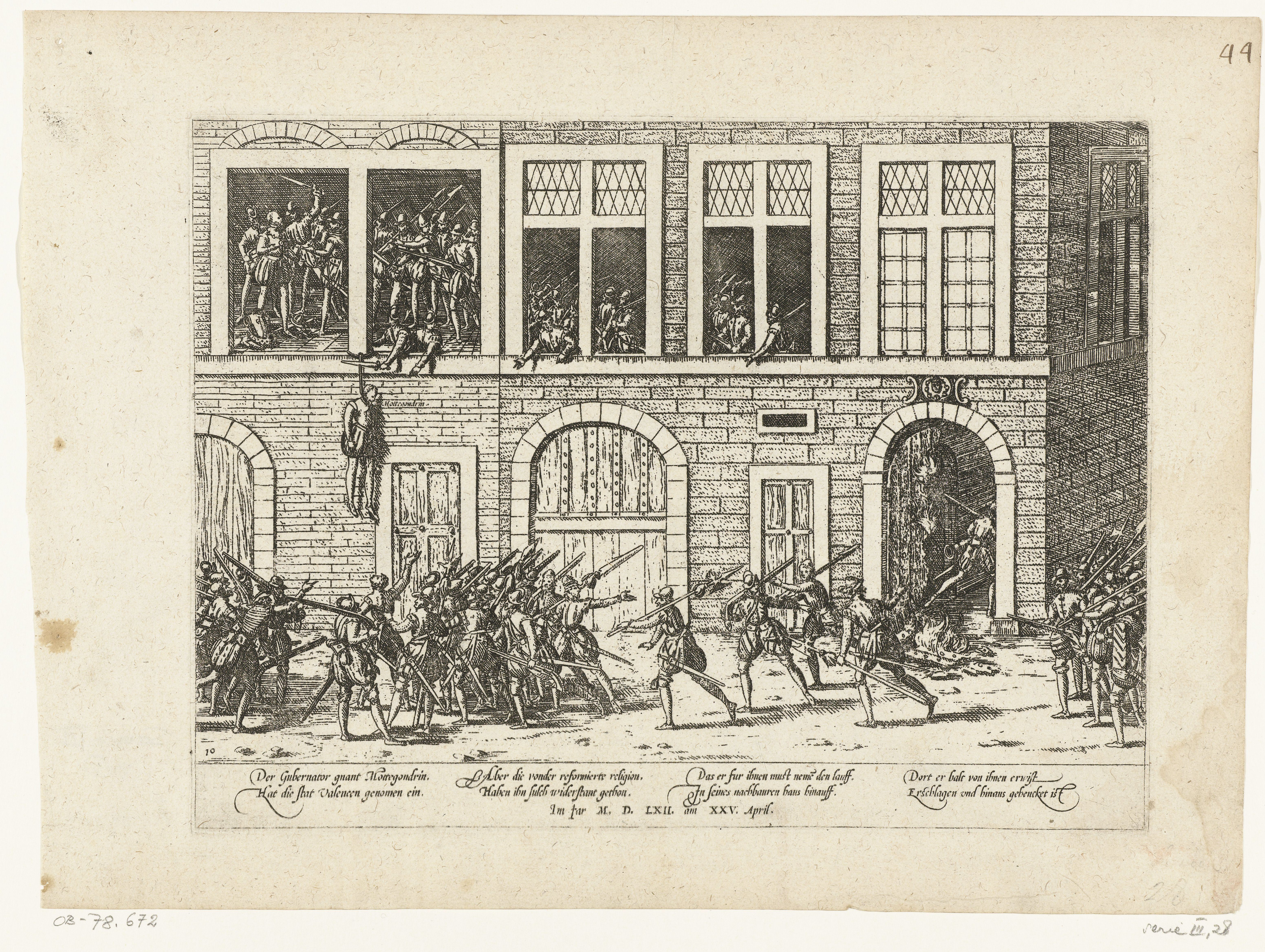
Hanging of the lieutenant-general of Dauphiné La Motte-Gondrin in Valence by the forces of Adrets

The baron des Adrets stormed Valence on 27 April. Shortly after its capture, the lieutenant-general of Dauphiné, La Motte-Gondrin who was present in the city was hanged.

The ordonnance of Valence, which were issued by the Protestant rebels in January/February 1563 admitted that some of their previous financial demands on the city had been excessive. Crussol permitted Valence to provide a sum of their choosing as opposed to the one that had been set for them after protest from their consuls.

That April the Valence consistory wrote to Crussol deploring the possibility that Maugiron and the parlement of Grenoble might return to the province with the peace. He was urged to make this opinion known at the court. Valence asked Romans for support in this, however the Romans consuls advised they were happy to trust in Crussol's judgement.

=== Romans ===
In May 1563 dispute arose in Protestant controlled Romans between the consuls of the town and the military administration over control of the gates. The consuls were hesitant to hand over control of the gates to the governor and suggested they would only do so if Crussol ordered them to. Crussol ordered the military formation that was in the city to leave Romans. Romans attempted to avoid the imposition of a garrison by the Protestant conseil politique based in Valence on grounds of poverty and a desire to defend the town with their own citizens. Eventually a garrison would be consented to, with Crussol informing the consuls that they must defer to the conseil politique.

=== Vienne ===
In Vienne the Protestants forced the bishop Jean de La Brosse to flee. By the end of the year, when there was dispute over the renewal of the cities consulate, a man named des Granges proposed the exclusion of Protestants from the office as 'people must be united in religion to exist in harmony and friendship'.

=== Die ===
Protestants, largely led by the artisans and merchants seized the town of Die. The community became notable for the large proportion of its population that volunteered itself for participation in the Protestant army of Guyenne. Of a total population of around 4,000, roughly 700 men left to join the Protestant army.

=== Montélimar ===
Montbrun fought in Dauphiné, as he had in 1560. On 28 June he issued a command to 26 of the churches of the province, urging them to bring to him the soldiers they had raised in the month prior to Montélimar by 1 July, in addition to any other men capable of bearing arms. Any who failed to heed the summons would be hanged.

=== Grenoble ===
Grenoble was captured for the rebel Protestant cause on 25 June by a force under the command of the baron des Adrets. One of the commissioners (André de Ponnat) who had served to peace keep in Provence in early 1562 was established as the rebel Protestant governor of the city.

Maugiron menaced the region around Grenoble in early 1563, pillaging the region of Trièves. The Protestants meanwhile consolidated their hold on Grenoble with continued conquests of communities around the city.

Grenoble was put under siege by a royalist force on 1 March. The comte de Crussol therefore made plans to relieve the city, assembling a force at Romans including an amount of artillery. To this end the Protestant minister of Valence wrote to the Protestant communities of Valence and Montélimar urging them to send troops in support of Crussol. Grenoble itself was subject to a barrage of artillery from Maugiron and the comte de Suze for several days before Crussol's approach caused them to retreat to Vienne. Crussol was able to successfully relieve the siege of Grenoble on 4 March. After making orders related to Grenoble's fortifications on 5 March, Crussol moved off to the Comtat Venaissin.

== Comtat Venaissin ==
Crussol launched a punitive expedition into the Papal territories in March 1563. He justified his campaign on the grounds that the Papal commander Fabrizzio di Serbollini had acted aggressively against French territories, subjecting French towns to "infinite cruelties". It has also been argued Crussol was responding to an appeal from the Protestants of Orange. Serbollini had indeed seized Camaret and Sérignan-du-Comtat towards the start of March, taking advantage of French attention being diverted. As such, for Crussol the campaign was a royal one to defend the kingdom of France against an external aggressor.

Crussol arrived with 2,000 infantry, 600 cavalry and several cannons. These had been levied from both Dauphiné and Languedoc. Towards the middle of March he invested Sérignan. Serbollini was elsewhere (Orange) and only some of his troops were available for the defence of the town. Crussol established himself at Pont-Saint-Esprit and undertook the preparations for a proper siege, including ensuring the supply of all the components of artillery, as well as pioneers. Serbollini despatched troops to frustrate the siege and while Crussol was able to drive them off it came at a heavy price. During the siege his brother Charles de Crussol, abbot of Feuillans was killed. Soldiers continued to arrive to reinforce Crussol, as well as new cannons. The town eventually fell to him and both the garrison and population were massacred. The bloody nature of fighting in the Venaissin allowed his reputation to be relatively unaffected by the brutality of the campaign. The surrounding region quickly fell to him.

After the massacre of Sérignan, Orange opened its gates to Crussol. A garrison was installed in the city under the command of the seigneur de Saint-Auban who was also given charge of the Comtat Venaissin by Crussol as he departed back to Languedoc. Under Saint-Auban's leadership, many more towns in the Papal territory fell to the Protestants.

== French Piemont ==
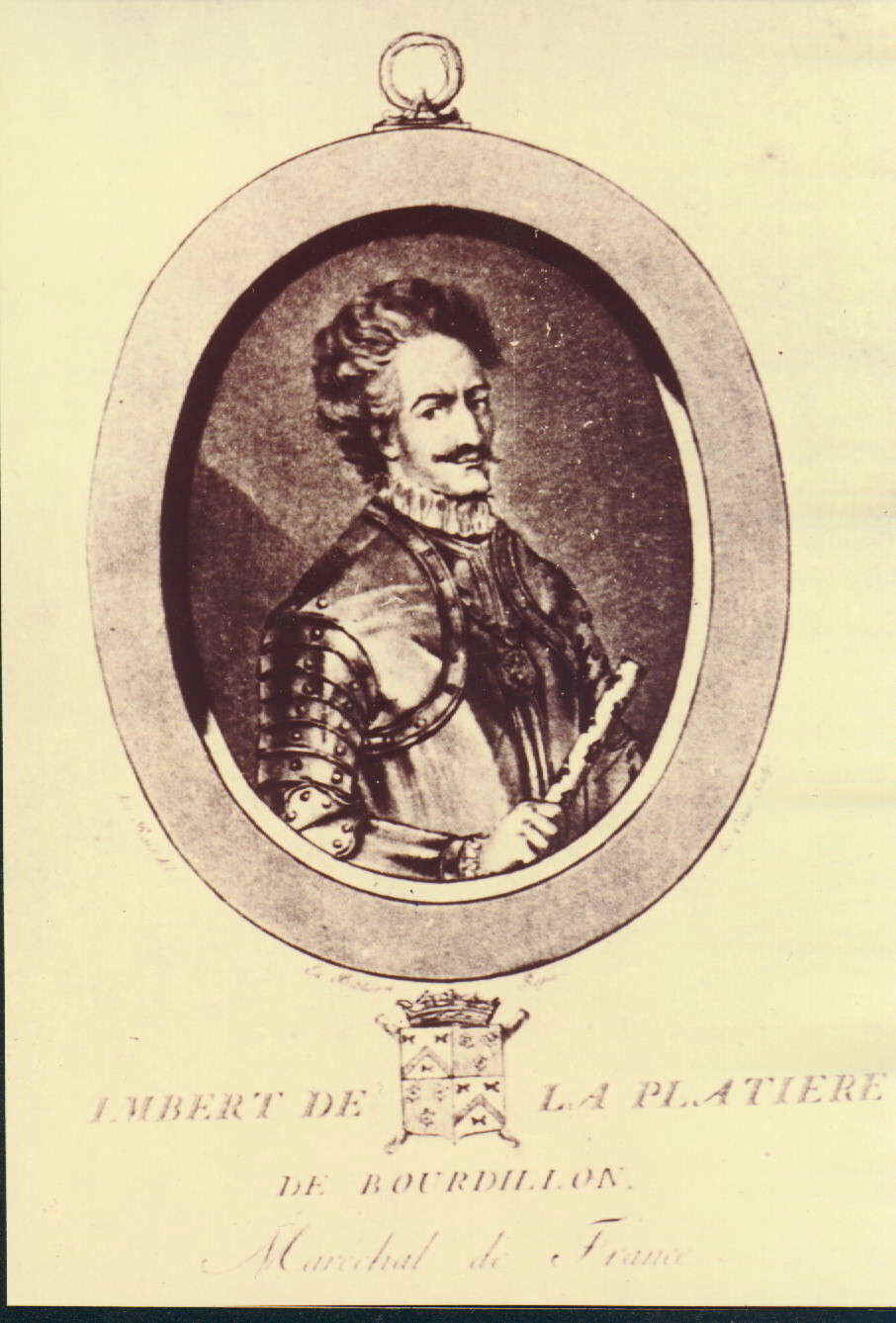
Seigneur de Bourdillon, lieutenant-general of French Piemont who was compensated for the loss of his territories with an elevation to the Marshalate

During August it was decided in council at Blois that it would be necessary to return the four French towns that France had maintained in Piemonte as a term of the peace of Cateau-Cambrésis to the duke of Savoy. The towns in question were Turin, Chieri, Villanova d'Asti and Chivasso. Savoy's support was seen as increasingly important for the crown as the war grew bloodier. Moreover, by ceding the towns the soldiers who garrisoned the places for France would be freed up for the royalist cause. To this end the lieutenant-general of French Piemont the seigneur de Bourdillon, the bishop of Orléans, René de Birague and Alluye were established as a commission to see to the restoration of the towns.

Bourdillon refused to hand the towns over to Savoy, arguing that the king was only a minor and could not rule on such matters. By October Bourdillon had been convinced to accede to the surrender of his towns. Catherine wrote desperately for Alluye to hurry in his efforts, as d'Andelot had recently entered the kingdom at the head of a German mercenary force. Passing through Savoy on his way to the Council of Trent in November, the cardinal de Lorraine signed the Treaty of Fossano with the duke of Savoy. To compensate Bourdillon for surrendering his governate to Savoy, Alluye promised the lieutenant-general that he would receive the first vacant office of Marshal that arose. Fortunately for Alluye and Bourdillon it came to pass that in December marshal Thermes died and therefore Bourdillon received his baton. Savoy granted to France in return for the surrender of these towns the small settlements of Pinerolo, Savigliano and Perosa.

== Catholic leagues ==
=== Agen ===
On 4 February 1563 Monluc established a Catholic league at Agen by which its members swore to protect the Catholic church and oppose the Protestant faith. Historians of the Agenais have seen it as an attempt to build a counter-infrastructure to that established by the Protestants at the synods of Clairac and Sainte-Foy. Monluc distributed the ordinance to neighbouring territories and Condom, Casteljaloux, Périgueux and the Quercy assured that they would work together.

The Catholic league of the Agenais was dismantled by Monluc in April in accordance with the edict of Amboise. Its legacy would however remain among the Catholic population of the region.

=== Toulouse ===
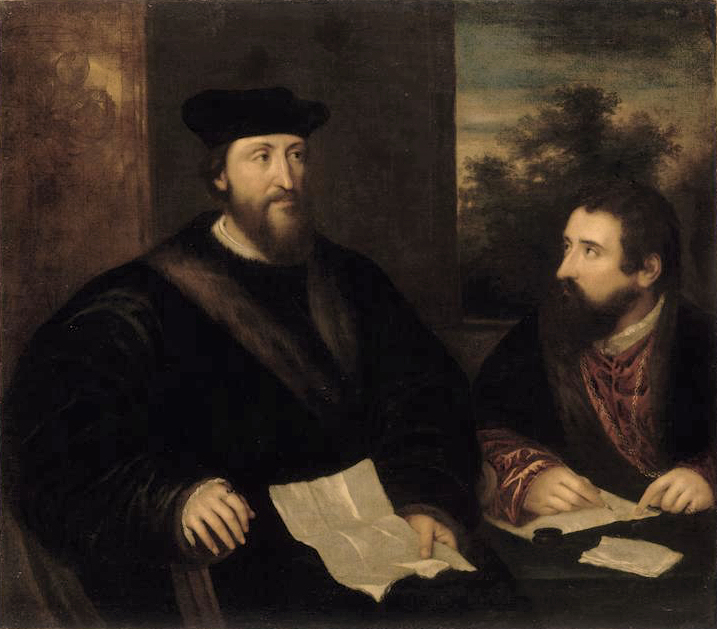
Cardinal d'Armagnac one of the leaders of the militant Catholics in Languedoc who founded a 'Catholic League'

In February 1563, the parlement of Toulouse brought together Monluc, Joyeuse, and other Catholic leaders of the south together for the formation of a more ambitious and far reaching league. This was on the pretext that another uprising by Toulouse's Protestants was possible. Cardinal d'Armagnac, and the archbishop of Albi spent March organising a meeting of Catholic officials at which they formed an anti-Protestant league. Also present among its members were the comte de Nègrepelisse, Baron de Fourquevaux (governor of Narbonne) and the comte de Terride (governor of Toulouse). The league was made public on 2 March in a ceremony at the Cathedral of Toulouse. All Catholics were to become members of the league and to this effect the ordonnance was distributed, to be read in all towns by the crier and displayed. The Catholic hardliners asked Monluc to put himself at the head of their league and to lead a Catholic army. This league began to assemble arms and men. Towns would be required to swear oaths in the league's favour before Joyeuse, on pain of being declared rebels if they did not. The goal of the league was to purge 'sedition and rebels' from the kingdom.

When word arrived of the edict of Amboise, which prohibited all such leagues the organisation was dissolved even before the edict had been registered by the parlement of Toulouse. Monluc withdrew from Toulouse to his estates at Estillac stating that 'war would not be started under my government'.

=== Bordeaux ===
The lieutenant-general of Dax, the comte de Candalle put himself at the head of a southern league in Bordeaux during March 1563, and many murders of Protestants were attributed to his organisation. On 10 March, Monluc had made a triumphant entry into Bordeaux with the comte de Candalle serving in his guard of honour. On 17 March, Candalle presented a denunciation of the premier président of the Bordeaux parlement Lagebâton before the assembled body, while his armed supporters waited outside the chamber. Lagebâton attacked Candalle's request to his colleagues, highlighting it contained only two signatures, and if it truly did represent a gathering of Catholic nobility then it was illegal. Lagebâton argued further that on 15 March Candalle and his various allies had schemed this attack on his presidency, after this the assembly broke down into angry recriminations. The exact timing of Candalle's league's formation is a matter of dispute, some suggesting Candalle formed it as a response to his failures in front of Lagebâton while others that he formed it on 13 March.

The Catholic league headed by the comte de Candalle refused to disband after the registration of the edict of Amboise by the Bordeaux parlement on 10 April. A few days later, the Protestant noble the sieur de Pardaillan, and premier président of the Bordeaux parlement complained to Catherine that an association had formed for the carrying out of 'evil deeds'. The latter urged Catherine to entrust suppression of the league to Monluc. Monluc reported he was not aware of any illegal associations. Lagebâton brought Candalle before the chamber on 4 May to answer for his league, and the comte again denounced Lagebâton in the name of the nobility. The conflict would continue to gestate over the following months bringing into it the commissioners sent out by the crown who ultimately failed to conclude whether Candalle's league existed or not.

== Sources ==
- Babelon, Jean-Pierre (2009). Henri IV. Fayard.
- Baumgartner, Frederic (1986). Change and Continuity in the French Episcopate: The Bishops and the Wars of Religion 1547-1610.
- Benedict, Philip (1999). "The Dynamics of Protestant Militancy: France 1555-1563". In Benedict, Philip; Marnef, Guido; Nierop, Henk van; Venard, Marc (eds.). Reformation, Revolt and Civil War in France and the Netherlands 1555-1585. Royal Netherlands Academy of Arts and Sciences.
- Benedict, Philip (2003). Rouen during the Wars of Religion. Cambridge University Press.
- Benedict, Philip (2012). "Prophets in Arms? Ministers in War, Minsters on War: France 1562-1574". In Murdock, Graeme; Roberts, Penny; Spicer, Andrew (eds.). Ritual and Violence: Natalie Zemon Davis and Early Modern France. Oxford University Press.
- Benedict, Philip (2020). Season of Conspiracy: Calvin, the French Reformed Churches, and Protestant Plotting in the Reign of Francis II (1559-1560). American Philosophical Society Press.
- Bernstein, Hilary (2004). Between Crown and Community: Politics and Civic Culture in Sixteenth-Century Poitiers. Cornell University Press.
- Bourquin, Laurent (1994). Noblesse Seconde et Pouvoir en Champagne aux XVIe et XVIIe Siècles. Éditions de la Sorbonne.
- Carroll, Stuart (2003). "The Compromise of Charles, Cardinal de Lorraine: New Evidence". Journal of Ecclesiastical History. 54 3.
- Carroll, Stuart (2005). Noble Power during the French Wars of Religion: The Guise Affinity and Catholic Cause in Normandy. Cambridge University Press.
- Carroll, Stuart (2006). Blood and Violence in Early Modern France. Oxford University Press.
- Carroll, Stuart (2011). Martyrs and Murderers: The Guise Family and the Making of Europe. Oxford University Press.
- Carroll, Stuart (2012). "The Rights of Violence". In Murdock, Graeme; Roberts, Penny; Spicer, Andrew (eds.). Ritual and Violence: Natalie Zemon Davis and Early Modern France. Oxford University Press.
- Carroll, Stuart (2013). "'Nager entre deux eaux': The Princes and the Ambiguities of French Protestantism". Sixteenth Century Journal. 44 4.
- Carpi, Olivia (2012). Les Guerres de Religion (1559-1598): Un Conflit Franco-Français. Ellipses.
- Carpi, Olivia (2005). Une République Imaginaire: Amiens pendant les Troubles de Religion (1559-1597). Belin.
- Chevallier, Pierre (1985). Henri III: Roi Shakespearien. Fayard.
- Christin, Olivier (1997). La Paix de Religion: L'Autonomisation de la Raison Poliitique au XVIe Siècle. Seuil.
- Christin, Olivier (1999). "From Repression to Pacification: French Royal Policy in the Face of Protestantism". In Benedict, Philip; Marnef, Guido; Nierop, Henk van; Venard, Marc (eds.). Reformation, Revolt and Civil War in France and the Netherlands 1555-1585. Royal Netherlands Academy of Arts and Sciences.
- Cloulas, Ivan (1979). Catherine de Médicis. Fayard.
- Constant, Jean-Marie (1984). Les Guise. Hachette.
- Constant, Jean-Marie (1996). La Ligue. Fayard.
- Constant, Jean-Marie (1999). "The Protestant Nobility in France during the Wars of Religion: A Leaven of Innovation in a Traditional World". In Benedict, Philip; Marnef, Guido; Nierop, Henk van; Venard, Marc (eds.). Reformation, Revolt and Civil War in France and the Netherlands 1555-1585. Royal Netherlands Academy of Arts and Sciences.
- Crété, Liliane (1985). Coligny. Fayard.
- Crouzet, Denis (1998). La Sagesse et le Malheur: Michel de L'Hospital, Chancelier de France. Champ Vallon.
- Crouzet, Denis (1999). "Calvinism and the Users of the Political and the Religious (France, ca. 1560-ca. 1572)". In Benedict, Philip; Marnef, Guido; Nierop, Henk van; Venard, Marc (eds.). Reformation, Revolt and Civil War in France and the Netherlands 1555-1585. Royal Netherlands Academy of Arts and Sciences.
- Dauvin, Antoine (2021). Un Mythe de Concorde Urbaine?: le Corps de Ville de Caen, le Gouverneur et le Roi durant les Guerres de Religion (1557-1594). Normandie Université.
- Davies, Joan (1979). "Persecution and Protestantism: Toulouse 1562-1575". The Historical Journal. 22 1.
- Diefendorf, Barbara (1991). Beneath the Cross: Catholics and Huguenots in Sixteenth Century Paris. Oxford University Press.
- Durot, Éric (2012). François de Lorraine, Duc de Guise entre Dieu et le Roi. Classiques Garnier.
- Foa, Jérémie (2004). "Making Peace: The Commissioners for Enforcing the Pacification Edicts in the Reign of Charles IX (1560-1574)". French History. 18 3.
- Garrisson-Estèbe, Janine (1980). Protestants du Midi 1559-1598. Privat.
- Garrisson, Janine (1991). Guerre Civile et Compromis 1559-1598. Éditions du Seuil.
- Gould, Kevin (2016). Catholic Activism in South-West France 1540-1570. Routledge.
- Greengrass, Mark (1983). "The Anatomy of a Religious Riot in Toulouse in May 1562". Journal of Ecclesiastical History. 34 3.
- Greengrass, Mark (1999). "Financing the Cause: Protestant Mobilization and Accountability in France (1562-1598)". In Benedict, Philip; Marnef, Guido; Nierop, Henk van; Venard, Marc (eds.). Reformation, Revolt and Civil War in France and the Netherlands 1555-1585. Royal Netherlands Academy of Arts and Sciences.
- Harding, Robert (1978). Anatomy of a Power Elite: the Provincial Governors in Early Modern France. Yale University Press.
- Heller, Henry (1991). Iron and Blood: Civil War in Sixteenth-Century France. McGill-Queen's University Press.
- Holt, Mack P. (2005). The French Wars of Religion, 1562-1629. Cambridge University Press.
- Holt, Mack (2012). "Religious Violence in Sixteenth-Century France: Moving Beyond Pollution and Purifucation". In Murdock, Graeme; Roberts, Penny; Spicer, Andrew (eds.). Ritual and Violence: Natalie Zemon Davis and Early Modern France. Oxford University Press.
- Holt, Mack (2020). The Politics of Wine in Early Modern France: Religion and Popular Culture in Burgundy 1477-1630. Cambridge University Press.
- Jouanna, Arlette (1989). Le Devoir de révolte: La noblesse française et la gestation de l'Etat moderne 1559-1661. Fayard.
- Jouanna, Arlette (1998). "Le Temps des Guerres de Religion en France (1559-1598)". In Jouanna, Arlette; Boucher, Jacqueline; Biloghi, Dominique; Le Thiec, Guy (eds.). Histoire et Dictionnaire des Guerres de Religion.
- Jouanna, Arlette (2021). La France du XVIe Siècle 1483-1598. Presses Universitaires de France.
- Kingdon, Robert M. (2007). Geneva and the Coming of the Wars of Religion In France 1555-1563. Librairie Droz.
- Knecht, Robert (1996). The Rise and Fall of Renaissance France. Fontana Press.
- Knecht, Robert (2008). The French Renaissance Court. Yale University Press.
- Knecht, Robert (2010). The French Wars of Religion, 1559-1598. Routledge.
- Knecht, Robert (2014). Catherine de' Medici. Routledge.
- Knecht, Robert (2016). Hero or Tyrant? Henry III, King of France, 1574-1589. Routledge.
- Konnert, Mark (1997). Civic Agendas & Religious Passion: Châlon-sur-Marne during the French Wars of Religion 1560-1594. Sixteenth Century Journal Publishers Inc.
- Konnert, Mark (2006). Local Politics in the French Wars of Religion: The Towns of Champagne, the Duc de Guise and the Catholic League 1560-1595. Ashgate.
- Mariéjol, Jean H. (1983). La Réforme, la Ligue, l'Édit de Nantes. Tallandier.
- Miquel, Pierre (1980). Les Guerres de Religion. Fayard.
- Nicoll, David (2020). Noble Identity during the French Wars of Religion: Antoine de Crussol, the duc d'Uzès. University of Warwick.
- Nicholls, David (1994). "Protestants Catholics and Magistrates in Tours 1562-1572: The Making of a Catholic City during the Religious Wars". French History. 8 1.
- Pernot, Michel (1987). Les Guerres de Religion en France 1559-1598. Sedes.
- Pitts, Vincent (2012). Henri IV of France: His Reign and Age. Johns Hopkins University Press.
- Potter, David (1993). War and Government in the French Provinces: Picardy 1470-1560. Cambridge University Press.
- Potter, David (1997). The French Wars of Religion: Selected Documents. Palgrave Macmillan.
- Potter, David (2001). "The French Protestant Nobility in 1562: The 'Associacion de Monseigneur le Prince de Condé'". French History. 15 3.
- Rivault, Antoine (2023). Le Duc d'Étampes et la Bretagne: Le Métier de gouverneur de Province à la Renaissance (1543-1565). Presses Universitaires de Rennes.
- Robbins, Kevin (1997). City on the Ocean Sea: La Rochelle, 1530-1650 Urban Society, Religion and Politics on the French Atlantic Frontier. Brill.
- Roberts, Penny (1996). A City in Conflict: Troyes during the French Wars of Religion. Manchester University Press.
- Roberts, Penny (2012). "Peace, Ritual and Sexual Violence during the Religious Wars". In Murdock, Graeme; Roberts, Penny; Spicer, Andrew (eds.). Ritual and Violence: Natalie Zemon Davis and Early Modern France. Oxford University Press.
- Roberts, Penny (2013). Peace and Authority during the French Religious Wars c.1560-1600. Palgrave Macmillan.
- Roelker, Nancy (1968). Queen of Navarre: Jeanne d'Albret 1528-1572. Harvard University Press.
- Roelker, Nancy (1996). One King, One Faith: The Parlement of Paris and the Religious Reformation of the Sixteenth Century. University of California Press.
- Romier, Lucien (1923). La Conjuration d'Amboise: L'Aurore Sanglante de la Liberté de Conscience, Le Règne et la mort de François II. Perrin et Cie.
- Romier, Lucien (1924). Catholiques et Huguenots à la cour de Charles IX. Perrin et Cie.
- Le Roux, Nicolas (2022). 1559-1629 Les Guerres de Religion. Gallimard.
- Salmon, J.H.M. (1979). Society in Crisis: France in the Sixteenth Century. Metheun & Co.
- Solnon, Jean-François (2001). Henri III: un désir de majesté. Librarie Académique Perrin.
- Souriac, Pierre-Jean (2008). Une Guerre Civile: Affrontements Religieux et Militaires dans Le Midi Toulousain (1562-1596). Champ Vallon.
- Sutherland, Nicola (1962). The French Secretaries of State in the Age of Catherine de Medici. The Athlone Press.
- Sutherland, Nicola (1980). The Huguenot Struggle for Recognition. Yale University Press.
- Sutherland, Nicola (1981). "The Assassination of François Duc de Guise, February 1563". The Historical Journal. 24 2.
- Tingle, Elizabeth C. (2006). Authority and Society in Nantes during the French Wars of Religion, 1559-1598. Manchester University Press.
- Thompson, James (1909). The Wars of Religion in France 1559-1576: The Huguenots, Catherine de Medici and Philip II. Chicago University Press.
- Tulchin, Allan (2010). That Men Would Praise the Lord: The Triumph of Protestantism in Nîmes 1530-1570. Oxford University Press.
- Turchetti, Mario (1999). "Middle Partis in France during the Wars of Religion". In Benedict, Philip; Marnef, Guido; Nierop, Henk van; Venard, Marc (eds.). Reformation, Revolt and Civil War in France and the Netherlands 1555-1585. Royal Netherlands Academy of Arts and Sciences.
- Tulchin, Allan (2012). "Massacres during the French Wars of Religion". In Murdock, Graeme; Roberts, Penny; Spicer, Andrew (eds.). Ritual and Violence: Natalie Zemon Davis and Early Modern France. Oxford University Press.
- Venard, Marc (1999). "Catholicism and Resistance to the Reformation in France, 1555-1585". In Benedict, Philip; Marnef, Guido; Nierop, Henk van; Venard, Marc (eds.). Reformation, Revolt and Civil War in France and the Netherlands 1555-1585. Royal Netherlands Academy of Arts and Sciences.
- Vray, Nicole (1997). La Guerre des Religions dans la France de l'Ouest: Poitou-Aunis-Saintonge 1534-1610. Geste Éditions.
- Wood, James (2002). The Kings Army: Warfare, Soldiers and Society during the Wars of Religion in France, 1562-1576. Cambridge University Press.
