= Raymond de Rouer de Pavie de Beccarie, Baron de Fourquevaux =

French soldier, governor and diplomat (1505/8-1574)

Raymond de Rouer de Pavie de Beccarie baron de Fourquevaux governor of Narbonne
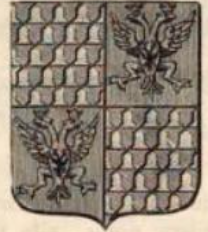
- The coat of arms of the marquis de Fourquevaux

10th French Ambassador to Spain
- In office 4 October 1565 – 23 February 1572
- Preceded by: Baron de Saint-Sulpice
- Succeeded by: Baron de Saint-Gouard

Personal details
- Born: 29 September 1505/1508 Toulouse, Kingdom of France
- Died: July 1574 Narbonne, Kingdom of France
- Spouse(s): Anne d'Anticamareta; Marguerite de La Jugie du Puy-Duval
- Children: Imberte; Esperance; Claude; François II
- Parents: François de Rouer de Pavie de Beccarie (father); Rose de Magnan (mother)

Raymond de Rouer de Pavie de Beccarie, baron de Fourquevaux, (29 September 1505/1508– July 1574) was a French noble, governor, military commander and diplomat during the latter Italian Wars and first French Wars of Religion. Born in either 1505 or 1508, Fourquevaux served in Italy under the command of the vicomte de Lautrec (viscount of Lautrec) in 1527, seeing service at the siege of Pavia at which he was wounded. In the French retreat out of the peninsula a little while later he was captured and spent a while in Spanish captivity. He was again in Italia during the campaigns of 1535 to 1537 and participated in the French conquest of Piemonte alongside the dauphin (heir to the French throne) the duc d'Orléans (duke of Orléans). In 1538 he was entrusted with his first diplomatic task, and succeeded in convincing the duke of Parma to defect from the Imperial camp. He fought alongside the dauphin again in 1542 at the unsuccessful siege of Perpignan In 1543 he served as one of the capitoul (civic magistrates) of Toulouse. That year, having repulsed an incursion into Roussillon by the Spanish he raided into Catalonia.

With the ascent of the dauphin as Henri II in 1547, Fourquevaux was made a captain in the Guyenne 'legion'. He wrote his most famous treatise on war in the following year: Instructions sur le faict de Guerre. In 1549 he was sent into Scotland to aid the regent Marie de Lorraine during the war with England known as the Rough Wooing. He was then tasked with answering the call of several great Irish magnates who wished to ally themselves with the French, and may have overseen their submission to the French crown shortly before peace was made with the English. In 1550 he was established as governor of Narbonne for the first time. In November 1550 he was entrusted with head to Bohemia to ensure that the Holy Roman Emperor did not pass the title of 'King of the Romans' to Philip, the future king of Spain, this mission was a success. With the resumption of the Italian Wars in 1551, Fourquevaux participated in the defence of Mirandola against Papal forces, and was made surintendant des finances (superintendent of the finances) for the king in Italia. Fourquevaux raised a relief army to come to the support of the comte de Brissac (count of Brissac) in 1554, and succeeded in besting Imperial forces to join with Brissac. Having done so he was present at the French defeat of Marciano and was again made an Imperial prisoner. After his release, Henri held concern as to Parma's loyalty to the French cause, and Fourquevaux was entrusted with ensuring he remained in the party. After this he was sent to the duke of Ferrara who expressed financial demands on the French crown to remain allied to Henri. The duc de Guise arrived in the Italian peninsula for a new campaign in 1557 and Fourquevaux facilitated a meeting between him and Ferrara. Fourquevaux was then sent again to Parma to stop him from coming to terms with Philip. Upon his return to France Fourquevaux was again established as the governor of Narbonne in July 1557.

With the advent of François II's reign in 1559, Fourquevaux ceased to be a client of the constable Montmorency and affiliated himself with the king's mother Catherine. After the outbreak of the first French War of Religion in 1562, Fourquevaux aided in the preservation of Narbonne for the royalist cause. He then travelled to Toulouse to aid in the fight after a Protestant coup attempted to seize the city. He fought alongside the lieutenant-general of Languedoc Joyeuse at the royalist victories of Saint-Gilles and Pézenas. Towards the end of the war he affiliated with the Toulousian Catholic League of the cardinal d'Armagnac and cardinal de Strozzi alongside the other chief Catholic captains of the Midi. However, before the league could accomplish much it was dissolved as a term of the peace edict of Amboise which brought the war to a close. In 1565 he received the nod from Catherine to become the new ordinary ambassador to Spain. In this role he allied himself with the queen of Spain (Catherine's daughter). During the controversy of the destruction of the French colony of Floride in 1566 by the Spanish he protested to Philip without success. In his capacity as ambassador he worked to see the fruition of Catherine's marital projects, chief among them that of the king Charles to the daughter of the Emperor Anna von Österreich. He succeeded in securing Charles' marriage to her younger sister Elisabeth in 1570. The negotiations for the marriage of Charles' sister Marguerite to the Portuguese king Sebastian would be a failure however. During the second and third French wars of religion, Fourquevaux worked to assure the Spanish king of the French determination to best the Protestants, and largely unsuccessfully appealed for Spanish support in crushing the rebels. After long campaigning for his relief, he was replaced as ambassador to Spain in 1572. That same year he resigned his governorship of Narbonne in favour of his brother-in-law the baron de Rieux. During the fourth war of religion in 1573, Fourquevaux was made the governor of Toulouse and wrestled with the civic authorities for support. He campaigned in the Lauragais. In May 1574 he and Joyeuse were entrusted with the arrest of the governor of Languedoc the baron de Damville. Damville went into rebellion and Fourquevaux ensured the preservation of Narbonne before going on the offensive against him. He died in July of that year.

== Early life and family ==
Raymond de Rouer de Pavie de Beccarie was born in Toulouse on 28 September either in 1505 (Souriac) or 1508 (Jouanna, Gellard). He was the son of François I de Rouer de Pavie de Beccarie and Rose de Magnan.

In addition to his baronie de Fourquevaux near Toulouse, Fourquevaux was the seigneur de Damiatte, Villeneuvette and Laguian-Mazous.

=== Marriage and children ===
Fourquevaux married twice. His first marriage was contracted in 1534 to Anne d'Anticamareta, the daughter of Antoine d'Anticamareta and Imberte de Lautrec. After her death he married again to Marguerite de La Jugie du Puy-Duval in 1558. Marguerite's brother the baron de Rieux would succeed him as governor of Narbonne.

With Anne he had the following children:

- Imberte de Rouer de Pavie de Beccarie. Abbess of the Order of Saint Clare.
- Esperance de Rouer de Pavie de Beccarie. Married Clément de La Roque the seigneur de Marignac.

With Marguerite he had the following children:

- Claude de Rouer de Pavie de Beccarie, baron de Fourquevaux (–February 1582). Died without issue.
- François II de Rouer de Pavie de Beccarie, baron de Fourquevaux (–March 1611). Married Marguerite de Chaumeuil with issue.

In his youth, Fourquevaux undertook studies in Toulouse.

Fourquevaux was proficient in both Castilian and Italian.

=== Opinions ===
Fourquevaux rejected the notion that duelling needed to be legalised among the nobility so they had an alternate channel for their violent urges as opposed to civil war. In Fourquevaux's estimation both noble feuds and civil wars generated one another. Fourquevaux believed that some Protestant aristocrats of Languedoc were in fact those who felt their careers had been stymied by Catholic rivals.

== Reign of François I ==
=== Italian campaigns ===
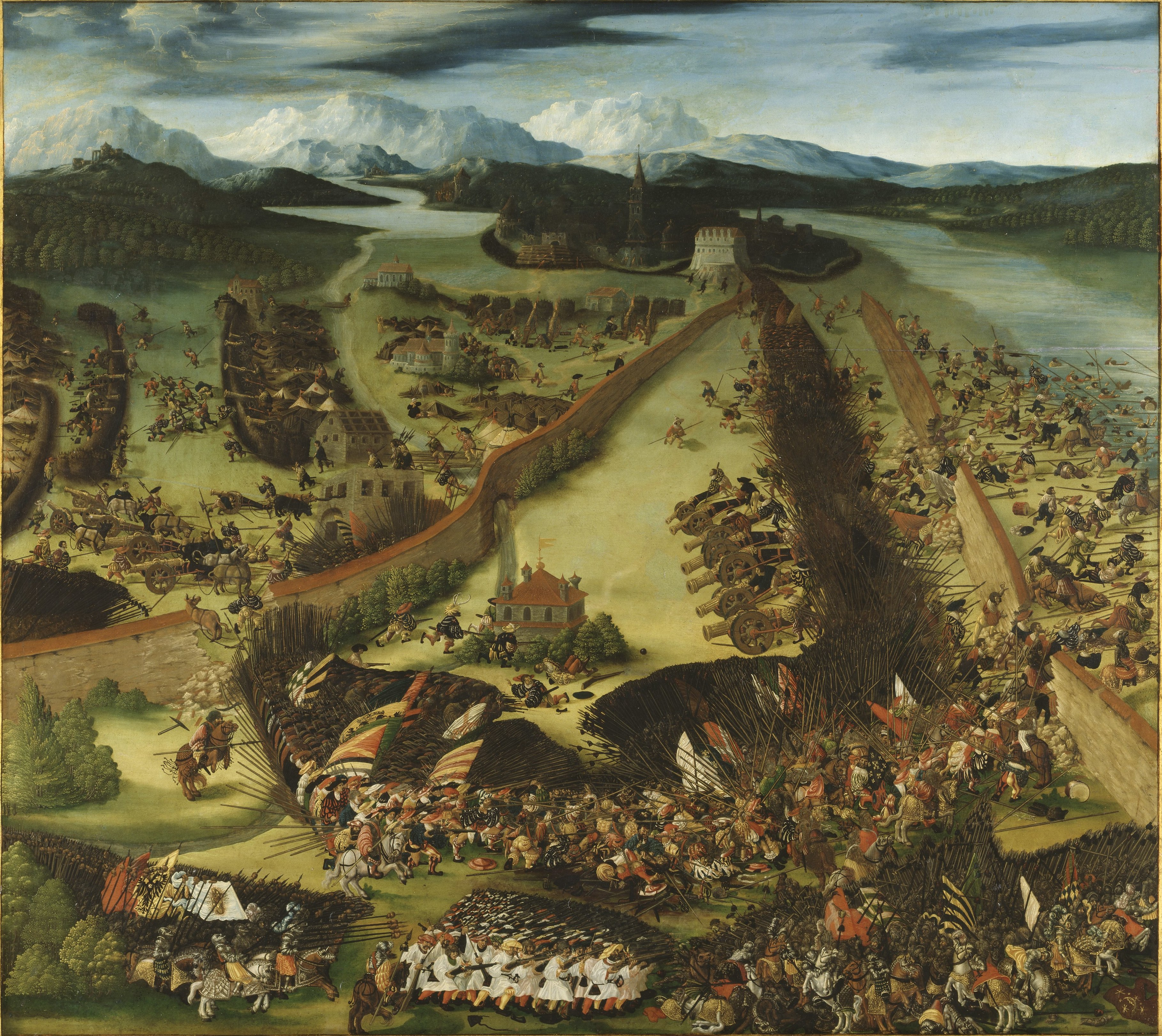
Battle of Pavia at which Fourquevaux may have fought

The Toulousian noble began his military career during the reign of François I. Fourquevaux fought in Italia in 1525, according to Souriac, and was one of the nobles made captive after the battle of Pavia.

At the age of 19, Fourquevaux went into Italia to fight under the overall command of the vicomte de Lautrec (viscount of Lautrec). He fought in the company of the comte de Nègrepelisse (count of Nègrepelisse). In 1527 he saw his first combat, according to Gellard, at the siege of Pavia, where he was wounded. He then went south to the French base in Naples where he stayed until the French retreat from the peninsula during which he was captured and held in Spanish captivity for eleven months before effecting his escape.

In 1530 after the establishment of the peace of Cambrai he returned to undertake further studies in Toulouse. Some sources claim that he received a doctorate in law during his second period of study in the city.

From 1535 to 1537 he was under arms again in Italia. This time he held the position of captain of a thousand men. In this capacity he participated in the French conquest of Piemonte alongside the dauphin the duc d'Orléans.

=== First diplomatic mission ===
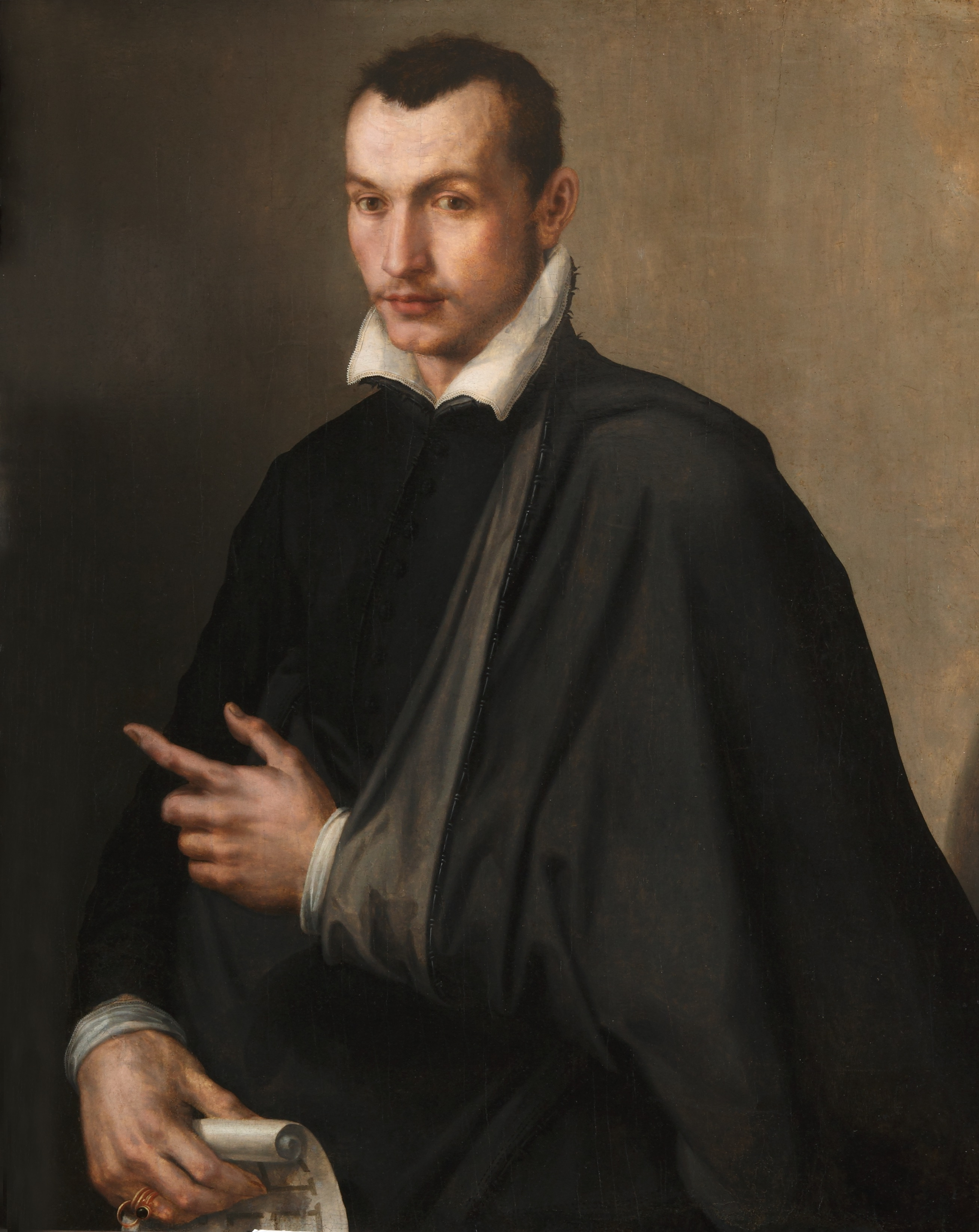
Duke of Parma to whom Fourquevaux would undertake three diplomatic missions in his career

Shortly after the marriage of the duke of Parma in 1538, Fourquevaux successfully convinced the duke to renounce his allegiance to the Imperial party and join with the French cause.

=== Spanish frontier ===
He was alongside the dauphin once more in 1542 when he participated in the siege of Perpignan. He took the opportunity to campaign into Catalonia as deep as Puigcerdà.

Back in Toulouse he was elected to the office of capitoul (senior civic magistrates of Toulouse) in 1543.

In 1543 he raised forces in Toulouse for the preservation of Carcassonne. He was then responsible for repulsing a Spanish invasion from Roussillon. Again he raided the Empordà in Catalonia.

== Reign of Henri II ==
In 1547 Fourquevaux assumed the position of captain in a company of the Guyenne 'legion'.

=== Scholar of war ===
Fourquevaux published a treatise on war in 1548 titled Instructions sur le faict de Guerre. According to Dickinson this text constituted one of the seminal texts on the art of war written during the sixteenth-century and received numerous translations and editions. He commentated on the army of François and deplored various military practices, proposing potential reforms to armies. Examples were mainly employed from Machiavelli's Art of War, but also Suetonius' The Twelve Caesars, Polybius' Histories and Caesar's Commentarii de Bello Gallico (Commentary on the Gallic War). He drove home the importance of maintaining discipline among the soldiery. To achieve this, strict measures were required. Fourquevaux bemoaned how war had become a standard mode of being, such that the soldiery practiced their career not out of devotion for a monarch but rather as a practice in itself. According to the baron this resulted in an inability of soldiers to make the adjustments required to return to a civilian existence.

=== Rough Wooing ===
In April 1549 Fourquevaux was dispatched to Scotland alongside the French reinforcements to be with the regent of Scotland Marie de Lorraine during the Siege of Haddington. While there he was appointed Governor of Hume Castle and participated in defending the castle from English attack. When, that same year, Irish magnates appealed to the French king Henri II for support against the government in England, Fourquevaux and Monluc were dispatched to the island see if an agreement with them could be arrived at. In the subsequent February, the diplomatic mission received an oath of loyalty from the king of Tyrconnell and the earl of Tyrone. It was alleged that the nobles agreed to devote their life and property to the protection of the French king. The coming of peace in 1550 terminated these discussions, and attempts at continued contact bore little fruit.

Henri made Fourquevaux governor of Narbonne for the first time in 1550.

=== Diplomat in the Empire ===
During 1550 Fourquevaux was tasked with further diplomatic missions, first to Italia and then to Bohemia. He headed into Italian peninsula alongside the French lieutenant-general of northern Italia, the comte de Brissac.

In November he was in Bohemia where he was tasked by the French king with ensuring that the office of 'king of the Romans' did not pass to Philip, former regent for the Holy Roman Emperor in Spain (and future king of Spain himself). His mission a success, Montmorency reported to Fourquevaux the king's satisfaction at his conduct.

=== Resumption of the Italian Wars ===
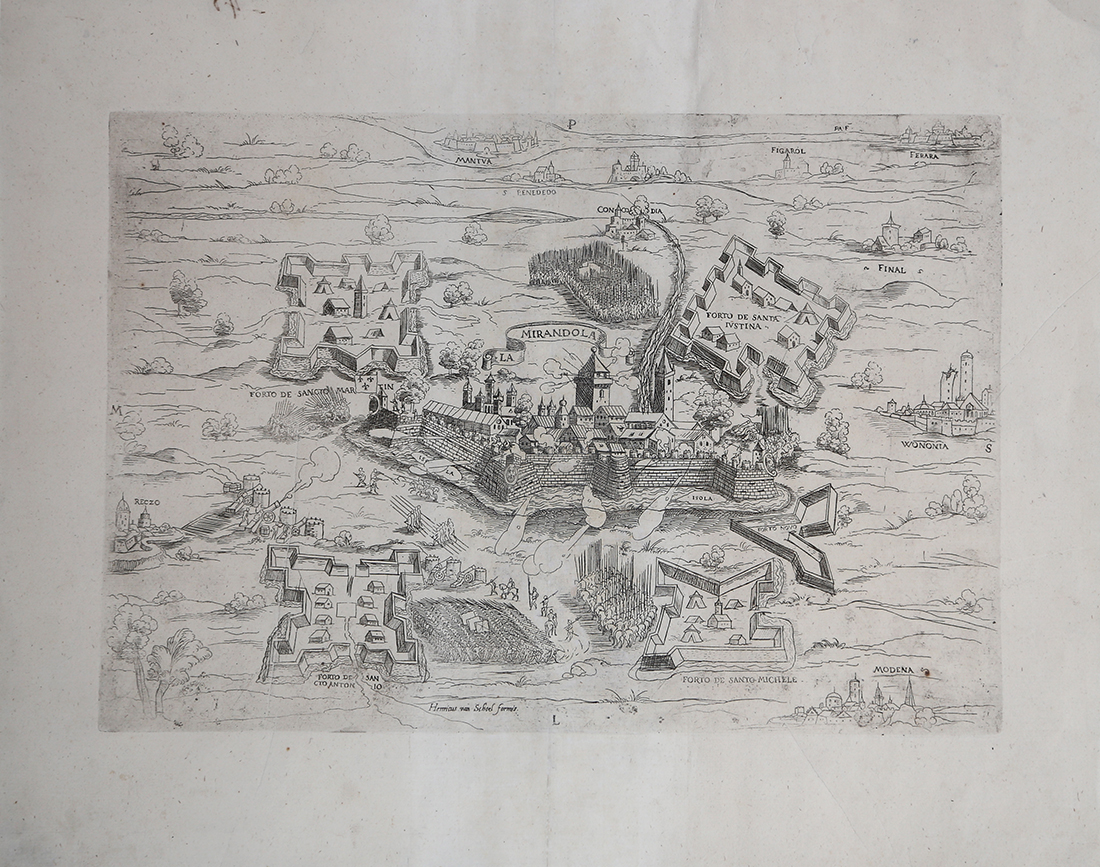
Papal siege of Mirandola in 1551 in which Fourquevaux aided in the defence

During the Parma war in 1551 Fourquevaux participated in the triumphant eleven month defence of Mirandola alongside the future Marshal de Sansac. During the siege, where Fourquevaux faced off against the Papal army, the baron proposed that the annexation of the Papal States be undertaken. Just as Pepin had donated the territory to the bishop of Rome, so too could France revoke this grant in light of the Pope's 'ingratitude' in Fourquevaux's estimation. After the successful defence of the city Fourquevaux was established there with responsibility for the administration of finance under the authority of the constable of France, Montmorency. Fourquevaux was a client of Montmorency. As surintendant des finances he had overall financial authority in the Italian peninsula alongside the bishop of Lodève.

Alongside this administrative role he was elevated to the position of panetier ordinaire du roi (ordinary baker of the king), before later in the year being established as gentilhomme ordinaire de la chambre du roi (ordinary gentleman of the king's chamber).

During the dispute between Henri II and the Papacy in 1551, Fourquevaux counselled the French crown through a letter to the sécretaire Beauregard to oversee the revocation of the donations of Pepin and Charlemagne which had created the territorial realm of the Papal States in Italia. During October, Fourquevaux alongside Boucher sécretaire to the French ambassador to Rome would lead the Gallican party in Italia in the conflict with the Papacy from his position as treasurer in Mirandola. They gleefully reported on the financial distress of the Papacy and urged him to continue to hold the line for a few more months. They were quick also to note that while the Pope protested his peaceful intentions, he was associating himself to a great extent with the Holy Roman Emperor. This Gallican party was opposed by an Ultramontane party, represented by the Lorraine-Guise family, the Este family and the cardinal de Tournon. They implored Henri to re-establish diplomatic relations with the Pope. The Ultramontane party went as far as to propose abandoning the Farnese and yielding Parma to the Pope. On 10 December Henri instructed Tournon to make for Rome, with diplomatic instructions drawn up by the Ultramontane bishop of Mirepoix. Tournon and the Pope would sign a peace agreement in April 1552.

=== Siena ===
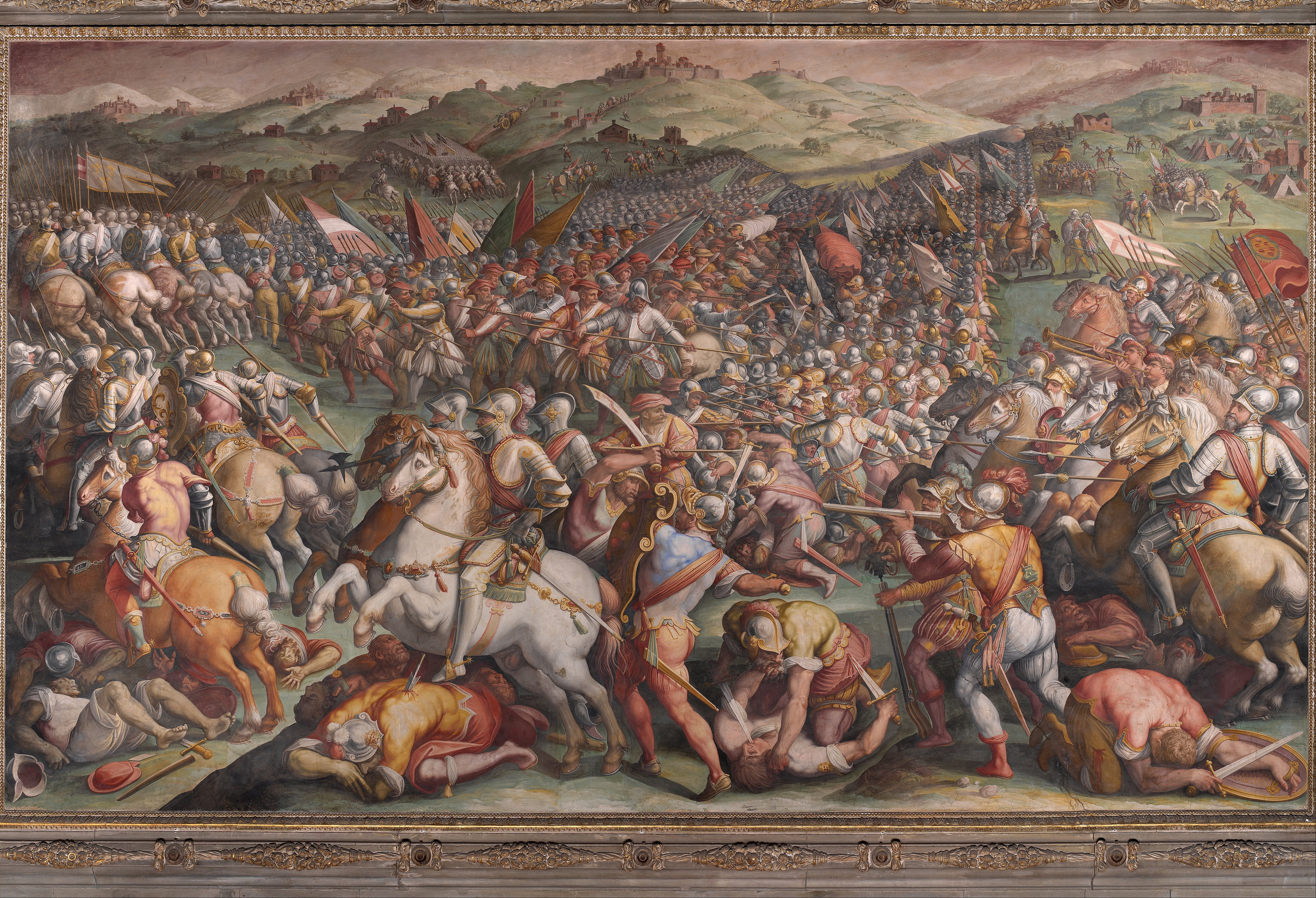
Battle of Marciano at which Fourquevaux was made captive for the second time in his career

Threatened with attack from both the Florentines and the Spanish, Siena fell to military government. Fourquevaux was entrusted with assisting in the raising an army to come to Siena's aid, and to this end helped build the army of around 12,000 that was to come to the city. Fourquevaux led the relief army in a forced march and several times bested Imperial troops on route to the city, capturing several Tuscan settlements.

In July 1554 Fourquevaux was with Strozzi in Siena for a council of war. Alongside Strozzi and Fourquevaux were the captains Monluc and the conte di Mirandola (count of Mirandola). Shortly thereafter Fourquevaux was part of Strozzi's army at the disastrous defeat of Marciano at which the French suffered 4,000 dead and a further 2,000 prisoners. Among the captured was Fourquevaux.

Fourquevaux would be in Imperial captivity for 13 months in Florence prior to his release. Monluc wrote that the capture of Fourquevaux and the seigneur de Lanssac was seen as a great boon by the Spanish who foresaw in their absence the collapse of the French position. While in captivity Fourquevaux wrote a memoir.

On his release from captivity he was showered with 'marks of esteem' by Henri.

By 1556 Henri was greatly fearful that he might lose the allegiance of the Farnese duchi di Parma (dukes of Parma). The duke of Parma wrote to Henri complaining that the French had failed to provide the subsidies promised in 1551, and that the French king was planning to deprive him of his lordship in favour of the Este family. This letter came as a great blow, and Henri wrote to the duke of Ferrara, cardinal de Tournon and the Pope to do what they could to stop Parma defecting to the Imperial cause. In a further effort Fourquevaux was dispatched with the mission of re-vitalising Parma's loyalty to the French cause.

The Truce of Vaucelles in February 1556 led to a pause in the Italian Wars, with its terms specifying conflict would be a truce for five years. However, by October that same year France was quickly moving back towards war at the behest of a party comprising the duc de Guise, cardinal de Lorraine, queen Catherine and Strozzi. In this month, Henri committed towards the war party at court and assured the Pope that he would soon be dispatching an army to support him into Italia. Fourquevaux was sent to the duke of Ferrara with conditions for a league. Not all at court were on board for this return to war, among the opponents was the constable de Montmorency. Fourquevaux wrote to him with information that the duke of Ferrara was demanding new financial concessions in return for his remaining in the French league. Montmorency was delighted at this news, and took it to the king exclaiming that the conditions Henri had given Fourquevaux to provide to Ferrara were unacceptable to the Italian prince, and they were thus released from their obligations. While Henri was surprised at this turn of events, he did not let it dissuade him from his decision to return to war.

=== Return to war ===
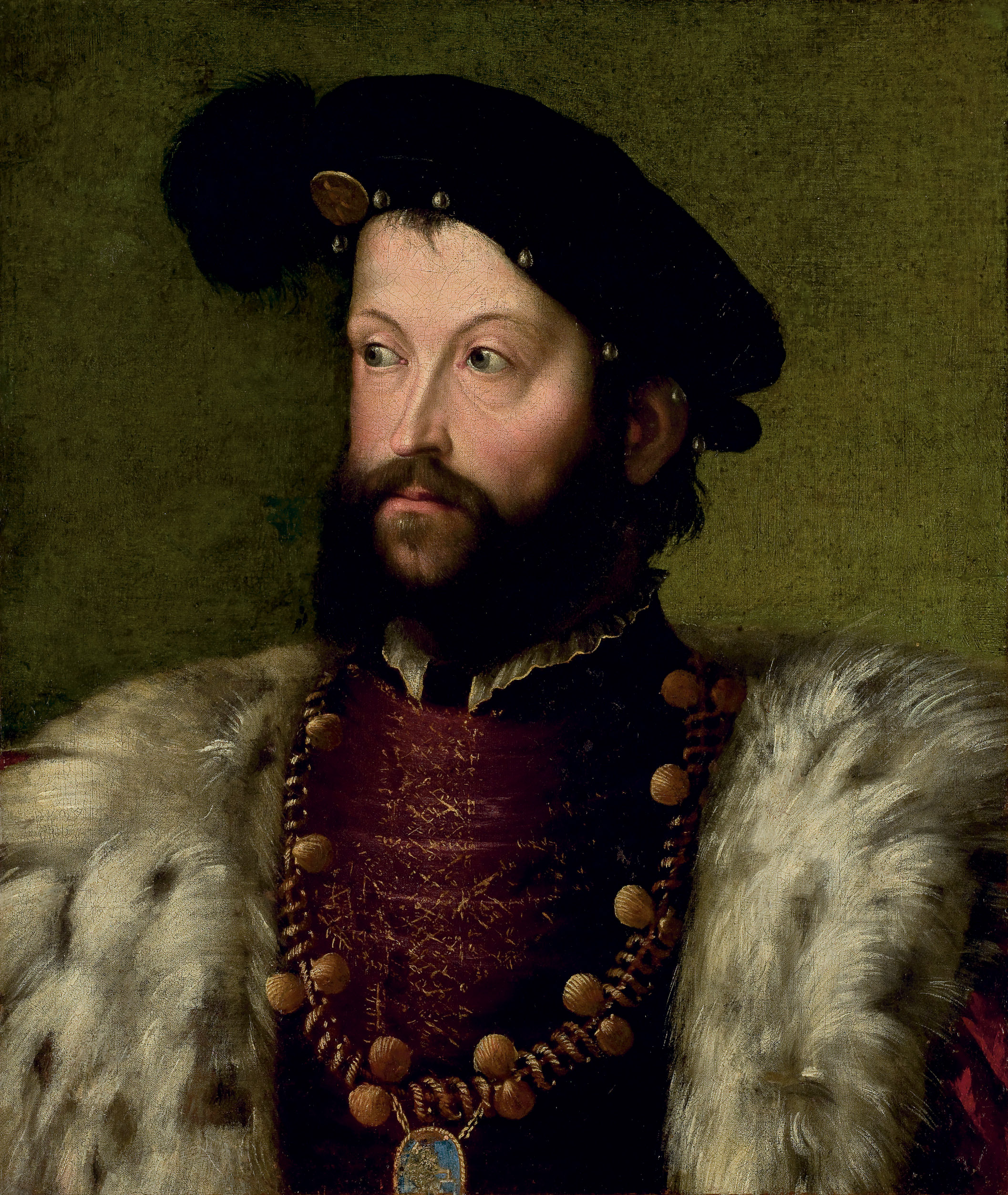
Duke of Ferrara, key French ally for the campaign of 1557

Henri therefore conceded to all Ferrara's financial demands shortly after the departure of Guise from the French court. Guise for his part wrote to Ferrara urging him to be ready to assist him in the occupation of Parma with both soldiers and ammunition. Fourquevaux was sent out from Turin to this end with precise instructions to the Italian prince on how he was to proceed. On 18 December he reported to Guise that the duke of Alba had retired to Naples 'with his barons', the enemy fleet had retired to Genoa and the grand duke of Tuscany had destroyed 1,500 men in Piombino. Guise arrived in Turin on 29 December and tarried for a while with the marshal de Brissac in the city until 9 January. While staying in Turin, Guise pondered at the end of December whether he should despatch Fourquevaux to the cardinale di Carafa to arrange a meeting between Carafa, Ferrara and Guise. For his part Ferrara little desired to use the French funds he had received for the prosecution of war, and thus when Guise arrived in Ferrara he found everything in a state of neglect. Fourquevaux reported on the state of affairs at Ferrara back to the court of France. When word arrived the court erupted in fury, with the cardinal de Lorraine raging at the representative of Ferrara at the French court.

The meeting Guise had proposed Fourquevaux arrange between himself, Carafa and Ferrara was arranged for Reggio Emilia and would transpire from 13 to 16 February. Guise was assisted at the meeting by the archbishop of Vienne and the seigneur de Lanssac. Ferrara requested that Guise see to the conquest of Cremona, which would supplement his territory, however both Guise and Carafa were hostile to this proposal that would see war with Milan. Therefore, it was agreed to attack Parma. Ferrara protested that he was too poor to support Guise's army, and therefore urged it quickly pass from his territories. Guise therefore advanced to Modena on 16 February before entering Papal territory where supplies were provided. By March Fourquevaux was among those who bemoaned that Ferrara's avarice had cost the French the opportunity to seize Parma. Fourquevaux made Guise aware of his opinion that Tuscany was vulnerable to attack. Such a project would not come to pass as the grandduke of Tuscany was in the process of negotiating a marriage between Henri's daughter Élisabeth and a Medici. The archbishop of Vienne further reminded Guise that the king's greatest desire was to see the conquest of Naples.

Soon after this word spread that an accord had been reached between Parma and Spain. Parma would receive Piacenza, Novara and the return of all family property seized in Naples. In further boon to Parma, he would be made the governor of Milan. This rumour was premature, negotiations had not yet been finalised. Fourquevaux arrived to meet Parma and reproached him in Henri's name. Parma responded that Fourquevaux was mistaken, and that he had undertaken no dealings with Philip II. Contrary to his a this time his negotiators were working out the terms of their deal in Bruxelles. Henri was unable to strike at Parma in retaliation, and therefore decided to withdraw the French provisions and other military supplies from Parma's territory. He still held out hope though that the situation could be reversed, and sent out Fourquevaux, who had returned to the French court to again go and treat with Parma. By this point it was far too late however, and the deal with Philip II was published in the city of Parma on 15 August.

=== Narbonne ===
Back in France Fourquevaux was established as governor of Narbonne for a second time on 11 June 1557. Narbonne occupied a key position on the frontier with Spain and he would aid in ensuring Narbonne remained in royalist Catholic hands until his death in 1574.

== Reign of François II ==
Montmorency urged Fourquevaux to take leave of his Narbonne charge in October 1559 so that he might go to the court and secure payment of unpaid wages that were owed to Languedoc. Nevertheless, the payments would remain unpaid in March of the following year.

With the advent of the reign of François II and the assumption of the government by Guise and Lorraine, Fourquevaux wrote to Guise in January 1560, appraising him of troop movements that he was aware of over the border in Spain. He wrote further to Lorraine about the sale of wood from the forests of Languedoc that he had been commissioned to undertake by the king.

Fourquevaux shared the rigid Catholic orthodoxy of the governor of Languedoc Montmorency and the lieutenant-general of the province, Joyeuse. Fourquevaux was however of Gallican disposition, for him the Pope as a prince could be both enemy and ally. His greatest opponents were any who challenged royal authority, be they Protestants or Catholics. Those Protestants who would defy the king were rebels and not Christians of the gospel, who would never attack their sovereign over matters of religion.

=== Catherine's party ===
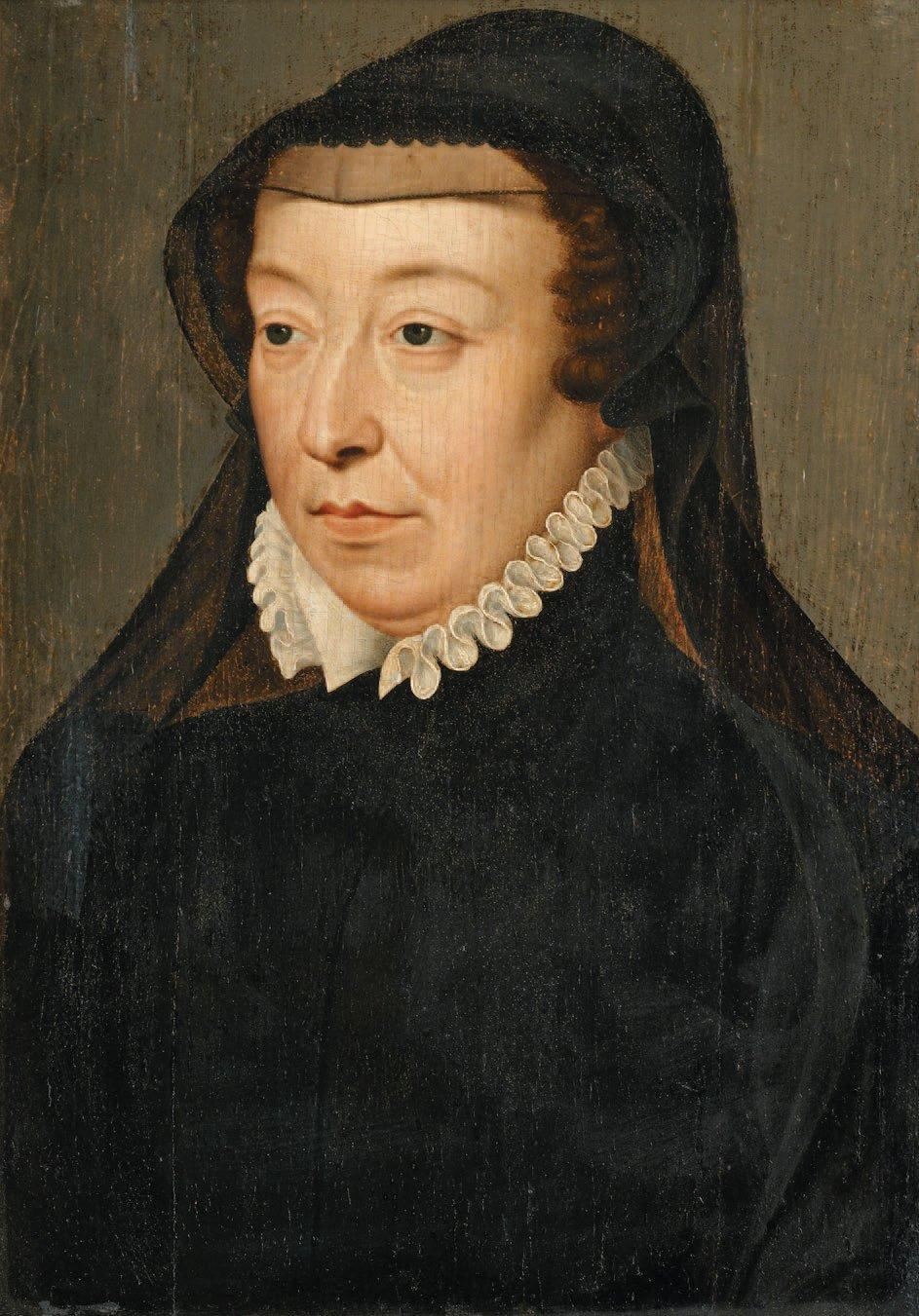
Fourquevaux's patron Catherine, wife of Henri II, mother of François II and Charles IX, regent of France 1560-1563

From 1559 until his death in 1574, Fourquevaux would be third most frequent subject of correspondence from the queen mother Catherine. He received 173 letters from Catherine, constituting almost 3% of her entire correspondence. Of those, all but four would be sent to him in his capacity as ambassador to Spain, a charge he occupied from 1565 to 1572. The remaining four were sent to him as the governor of Narbonne.

Around this time he moved from being a client of Montmorency's to a client of Catherine's.

== Reign of Charles IX ==
=== First French War of Religion ===
In April 1562 France was thrown into the civil war after the Protestant prince de Condé seized Orléans and issued a manifesto of rebellion. Many cities in France joined with him over the coming months.

During May Fourquevaux was entrusted by the lieutenant-general of Languedoc, Joyeuse, with overseeing the suppression of a Protestant sedition in Narbonne.

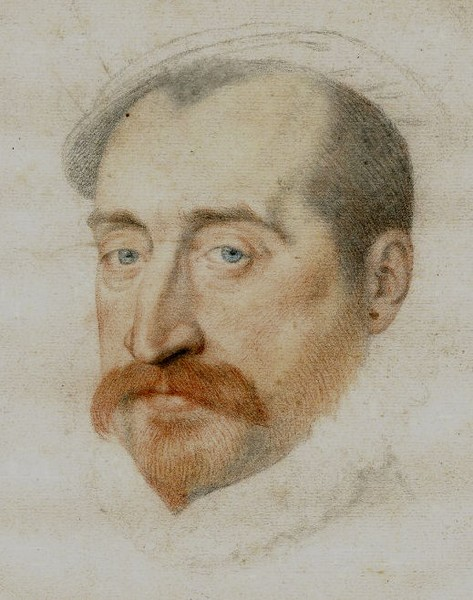
Lieutenant-general of Languedoc the vicomte de Joyeuse

On 11 May 1562 a faction of Protestants in Toulouse attempted to seize the city. The Catholics of Toulouse appealed for support from nearby military commanders. Three days after the start of the uprising, Fourquevaux arrived in the city with his soldiers, alongside other commanders including the baron de Terride and Marshal de Thermes. Their forces inhibited the provision of support to the cities Protestants by their coreligionists in Castres and Montauban. In the brutal fighting for the city, over 3,000 would be killed, with the royalist Catholics emerging victorious. Fourquevaux played a key role in the negotiation of the truce on 17 May with the remaining rebel Protestants in the city. Soon thereafter Monluc arrived and began overseeing repression in Toulouse. Fourquevaux lauded the role of Monluc in the preservation of the city, writing to the baron de Saint-Sulpice that without Monluc's intervention the city would have fallen.

In June Fourquevaux bemoaned to Saint-Sulpice that the Protestants had established themselves in Languedoc under the sieur de Beaudiné and were acting like they enjoyed the authority of the king's deputies in the province through the establishment of 'commands and commissions'. He mournfully noted that the lieutenant-general of Languedoc, Joyeuse needed to be provided more troops by the king, as the alternative was relying on local soldiers for the reconquest of the province, and these troops were prone to 'wicked deeds'.

In the southern campaign of the war Fourquevaux, in his capacity as a captain of a compagnie d'ordonnance took a leading role in the local royalist Catholic war effort alongside other similar captains such as baron de Terride and the baron de Nėgrepelisse. He fought alongside the vicomte de Joyeuse at the royalist victories of Saint-Gilles and Pézenas. He was further able to block the baron des Adrets at Lattes near Montpellier. According to Souriac, the military experience of captains such as Fourquevaux and Terride allowed them to enjoy an equivalent prestige to that of the provincial governor or lieutenant-general.

With word reaching the Catholic commanders of Languedoc that the rebel Protestants under the command of the seigneur de Duras and the comte de Crussol might seek to hijack the estates of Languedoc when they met at Carcassonne in December they undertook a secret meeting to plan a response. Present were Monluc, Terride, Nègrepelisse, Joyeuse, Fourquevaux, leading militant Catholics of the parlement and the cardinals de Strozzi and d'Armagnac. At the meeting it was agreed that Monluc would guard Toulouse during the period at which the Estates were gathered (lest Carcassonne be used as a distraction by the Protestants). There would be no assault on Carcassonne by the Protestants, and the Estates were freed to promulgate a strongly anti-Protestant agenda.

On 12 January 1563 Fourquevaux was elevated to the most senior order of French chivalry, receiving the collier (collar) of the Ordre de Saint Michel (Order of Saint-Michel). He received the honour alongside Nègrepelisse in an elaborate ceremony at the cathedral of Saint-Étienne in Toulouse from Armagnac and Monluc. Many Catholic grandees from across the province attended the occasion.

In the final days of the first civil war, Fourquevaux affiliated himself with a Catholic League that had been established by the cardinal d'Armagnac and cardinal de Strozzi on 2 March 1563. The purpose of the association was to combat Protestantism in France. The league was endorsed by the parlement of Toulouse on 20 March. Alongside Fourquevaux in the league were the seigneur de Monluc, lieutenant-general of Guyenne; the lieutenant-general of Languedoc Joyeuse; the baron de Terride and the baron de Nègrepelisse. The league was modelled on those established by the rebel Protestants, with four layers of authority from the province down to the parish level, overseen by councils of members of the three estates and captains responsible for the raising of soldiers. A system for the raising of an army was established to be funded by league levied taxes. A mandatory oath before Joyeuse would be required on pain of being considered a rebel. According to Carpi the coming of the end of the civil war during March did not bring about the end of the recently formed league. According to Gould the league would be dissolved even before the edict of Amboise, which mandated the abolition of such leagues was registered by the parlement of Toulouse. Monluc for his part withdrew from Toulouse with the word of peace. For Gellard, Fourquevaux's affiliation with the Catholic league of Toulouse did not represent his ambitions to be a man of faction, but rather his desire to see the province maintained for the king.

Fourquevaux did not agree with the application of the various pacification edicts that brought the first three civil wars to a close. Nevertheless, he was committed to the crown and therefore supported them.

=== Appointment to Spain ===
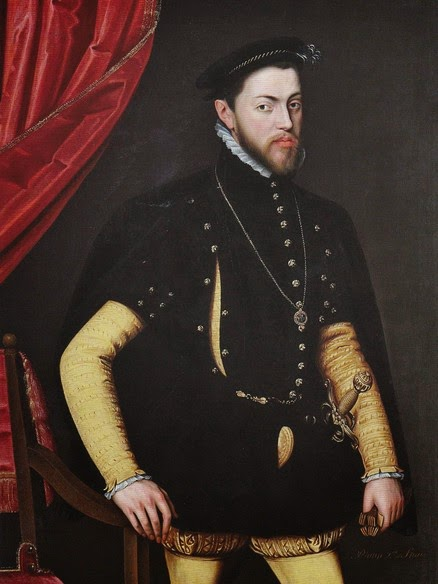
King of Spain Philip II

On 7 July 1565, Catherine wrote to Fourquevaux informing him that he was to be established as the new French ambassador to Spain. Fourquevaux travelled from Narbonne to have an audience with the king and his mother at La Rochelle at which he was given his instructions as ambassador. On 14 September he set out to Spain. By this time he had already served as extraordinary ambassador in six extraordinary missions, but never as a resident ambassador.

Fourquevaux was therefore established as the French ambassador to Spain, arriving in Segovia on 4 October. In the estimation of Cloulas, Fourquevaux, and the ambassadors that proceeded him (the baron de Saint-Sulpice and bishop of Limoges) conducted themselves in Spain with timidity. In this role he would receive correspondence from both the king and Catherine, though as Gellard highlights, it is clear Catherine was involved in that sent by the king also, at minimum aware of it if not actively shaping what is written in his dispatches. On occasion other documents would also be provided such as articles related to peace negotiations, and letters for him to give to the Spanish king Philip and his wife Élisabeth. Catherine would appraise Élisabeth of French policy and on occasion write to her as if she was also a French diplomatic agent. Fourquevaux would sometimes give the letters to Philip to Élisabeth who would then pass them on to her husband. The king's despatches would outline the political strokes and military affairs in the kingdom, instructions for Fourquevaux. Catherine's despatches would elaborate and explain what was stated in the king's correspondence, and placed a greater emphasis on discussion of matrimonial negotiations. The two correspondences never contradicted one another. Only rarely would Fourquevaux correspond with the sécretaires d'État (secretaries of state) directly in his writings back to the French court.

Fourquevaux for his part far more frequently wrote to Catherine than the king, and Gellard sees this as evidence of his role as a client of hers. For the post of ambassador Fourquevaux enjoyed an annual income of 7,200 livres (pounds). Nevertheless, this income often went unpaid, and desperate requests for money were thus sent by Fourquevaux to the French court. Notably in 1570 Fourquevaux protested that his 'lamp was without oil'. Being ambassador to the Spanish court would be an expensive position for Fourquevaux, and he incurred extraordinary expenses of 3,683 livres a year during his residency. Gellard contrasts the opinionated and personal nature of the dispatches Fourquevaux provided the court with the neutral and impersonal dispatches of his contemporary French ambassador in England, La Mothe-Fénelon. For Fourquevaux, he could fulfil his noble obligation to advise the king in this way. The English ambassador's correspondence with the crown would be far more frequent. Meanwhile, Fourquevaux's distance from the crown afforded him greater latitude of action. Just as the royal despatches to him contained correspondence intended for the attention of Catherine's daughter, Élisabeth's desire (and occasionally Philip's) to send letters back to her family in France would according to Fourquevaux often delay the sending of his diplomatic packet to the French court.

=== Opinions on mission ===
For Fourquevaux this assignment put him in an unusual position, to defend Catherine's policy of religious concord that he despised and deal with the Spanish attacks against the French crown to which he was attached. He therefore described the posting as a "long chore". Over the course of his ambassadorship he would request recall forty times. His protests to be relieved accelerated after 1568, appearing in almost 20% of his letters. He made the appeals on the grounds of his ill health, his age, and his poverty without success. Such appeals were common from ambassadors. As to his religious disposition there was utility to the crown in having a zealous Catholic in this post close to Philip.

Unlike many Catholics with Philip or Protestants with the English queen Elizabeth, Fourquevaux would never see in Philip the solution to domestic French affairs. Through his life he would remain hostile to Spain, and these feelings would only grow during his ambassadorial residency. He derided two thirds of the Spanish population as being Morisco (former Muslims or their descendants), or Converso (former Jews or their descendants). As a result of this heritage he found the kingdoms claims to pre-eminent Catholicism laughable. Alongside his religious bigotry towards Spain he held further distaste for the Spaniards 'haughty demeanour' which in his estimation was entirely unearned. He contrasted the Spanish military pride with the difficulty Philip had putting down the Morisco revolt. Gellard highlights that his virulently anti-Spanish disposition may not be entirely organic, but also partly provided to the French crown as an assurance of his loyalty in the face of doubts about him.

As concerns France, Fourquevaux was of the opinion that the kingdom had lost none of its strength despite the civil war.

In his absence from France, control of the governorship of Narbonne fell to his brother-in-law the baron de Rieux.

=== Early marriage negotiations ===
The court was at this time partaking in a ground tour of the country and Catherine ensured that while the court was passing through the south-west of the country it took its time, so as to afford Fourquevaux the maximum possible opportunity to clinch a proposal of marriage between the French royal family and the Spanish. Catherine envisioned three marriages which Fourquevaux worked to impress upon the Spanish king: that of her son the king to the daughter of emperor Maximilian Anna; that of her daughter Marguerite to Philip's son Don Carlos; and that of her son the duc d'Orléans to Philip's sister Juana. A marriage between Charles and one of the Emperors' daughters had first been floated in early 1561.

In May 1566 Catherine ordered Fourquevaux to ensure that when he provided diplomatic dispatches back to France, that he put any discussions related to Charles or Marguerite's marriages in a separate secret packet that was to be delivered directly to the sécretaire L'Aubespine. Meanwhile, regular dispatches would be opened by the sécretaire responsible for that geographic department, the seigneur de Fresne. L'Aubespine's sector did not include Spain but rather Savoy, the Empire, and the Swiss Confederation.

According to Chevallier, there was 'no doubt' that Fourquevaux informed Catherine that there could be no prospect of marriage between her son the duc d'Anjou and the king of Spain's sister Juana. Fourquevaux would have advised some time during the royal tour of the kingdom that Philip could not countenance the age gap between the two.

=== Relationship with Élisabeth ===
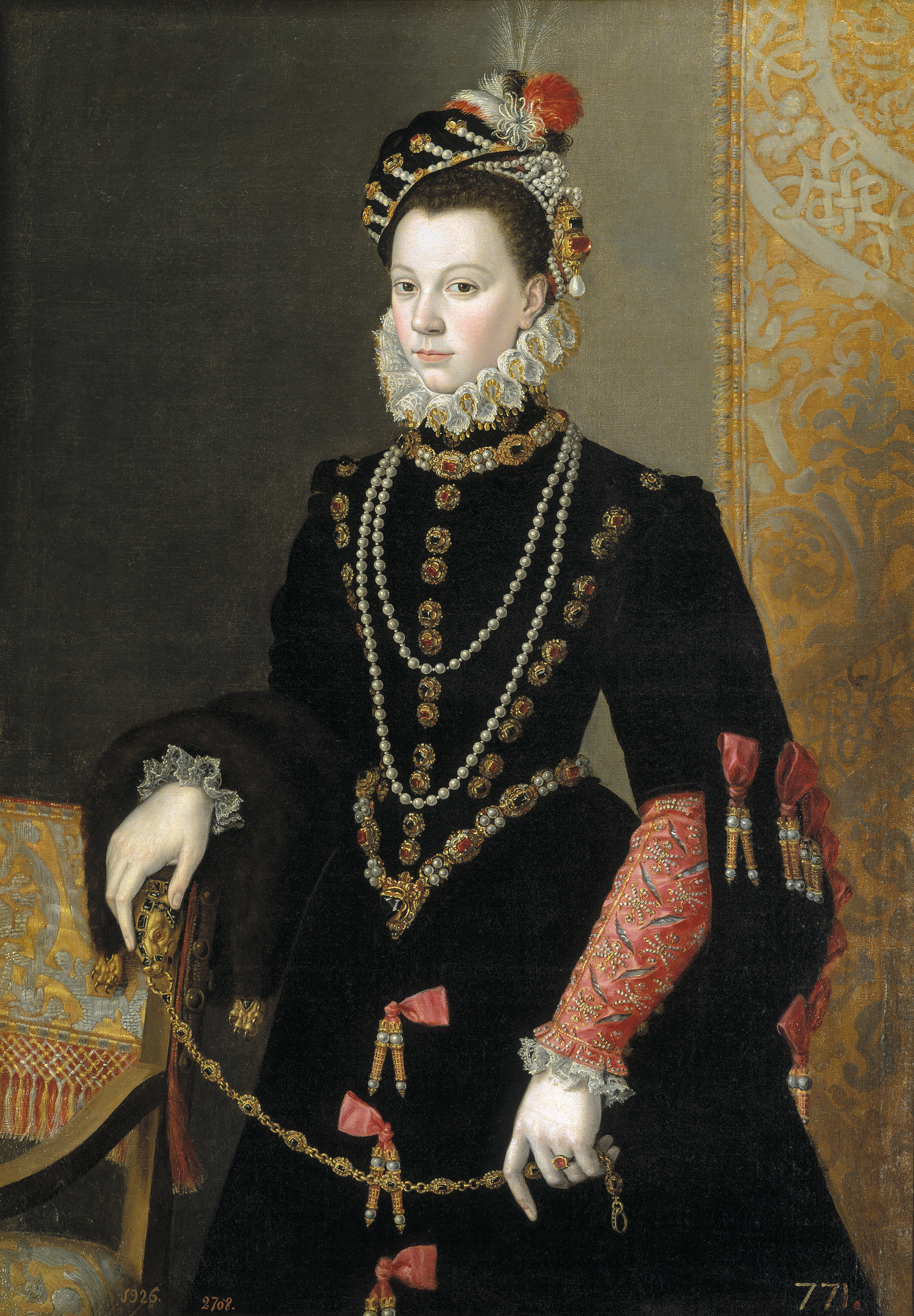
Queen of Spain and ally of Fourquevaux Élisabeth

Established in Spain, Fourquevaux quickly established a rapport with Catherine's daughter Élisabeth, the queen of Spain. In part this was an element of his mission in Spain, with regular reports on her health (which was often fragile) provided back to the French court. It was also hoped that her love of France would aid Fourquevaux by providing him a clearer picture of Philip's policy. Fourquevaux wrote back to the French court with pride that Élisabeth chose to hold a child of his during their baptism. When a couple of years later he had a daughter, Élisabeth enjoined him expressing her pleasure at the good health of Fourquevaux's wife and asked whether Fourquevaux might name his new daughter Élisabeth as she considered the child as she would her own. Élisabeth also worked to ensure that Fourquevaux was not recalled in favour of another ambassador, and let it be known that she and Philip would reject such a recall if it was issued.

The bond between Fourquevaux and Élisabeth would be invaluable to Fourquevaux due to the fact Philip was often absent from Madrid. Therefore, Élisabeth served as a key conduit of his communications with the king. By this means Fourquevaux enjoyed a privileged access to the Spanish king. Philip for his part was aware of the rapport and used it in turn for his own ends.

=== Audiences ===
During his ambassadorship Fourquevaux would enjoy roughly 69 audiences with the Spanish king. The distribution of the audiences was made erratic by Philip's frequent absences from Madrid. The audience functioned as a replacement for direct dialogue between two princes, with Fourquevaux the mouth piece for the words of the French king. With the exception of events at the court such as the death of Élisabeth, Fourquevaux needed a reason to request an audience with Philip, i.e. the arrival of a new despatch from the French court. Thus negotiations with the Spanish crown were frozen in periods where the French court did not write to him, as in the spring of 1570. Philip spoke highly of Fourquevaux and enjoyed warm relations with the French ambassador.

In the despatches Fourquevaux prepared to send back to France, the contents of what was said by the Spanish king during the audience would often constitute the first element of what he wrote. Fourquevaux aimed to be sensitive to the emotions of the Spanish king, and included reports of his perception of Philip's emotional state in his letters. This was made more challenging by the highly protocolised nature of Philip's behaviour during the meetings he had with Fourquevaux. Fourquevaux too would have been expected to frame what he said around the despatch he was imparting to the Spanish king. As such there was very little room for manoeuvre. When Fourquevaux spoke on his own initiative during an audience he would need to receive the approval of the king or Catherine retroactively. It was necessary for this to be a possibility due to the flexibility required in diplomacy. For example, Fourquevaux reported to Charles in September 1570 that in his most recent audience with Philip in August he had first delivered the words of the king and then some of his own.

To Fourquevaux's dismay, despite the various rebellions that would face Philip in the coming years during his ambassadorship, the Spanish government was stable and fairly unquestioned. On the royal councils therefore he lacked much in the way of support.

=== Colonial disputes ===
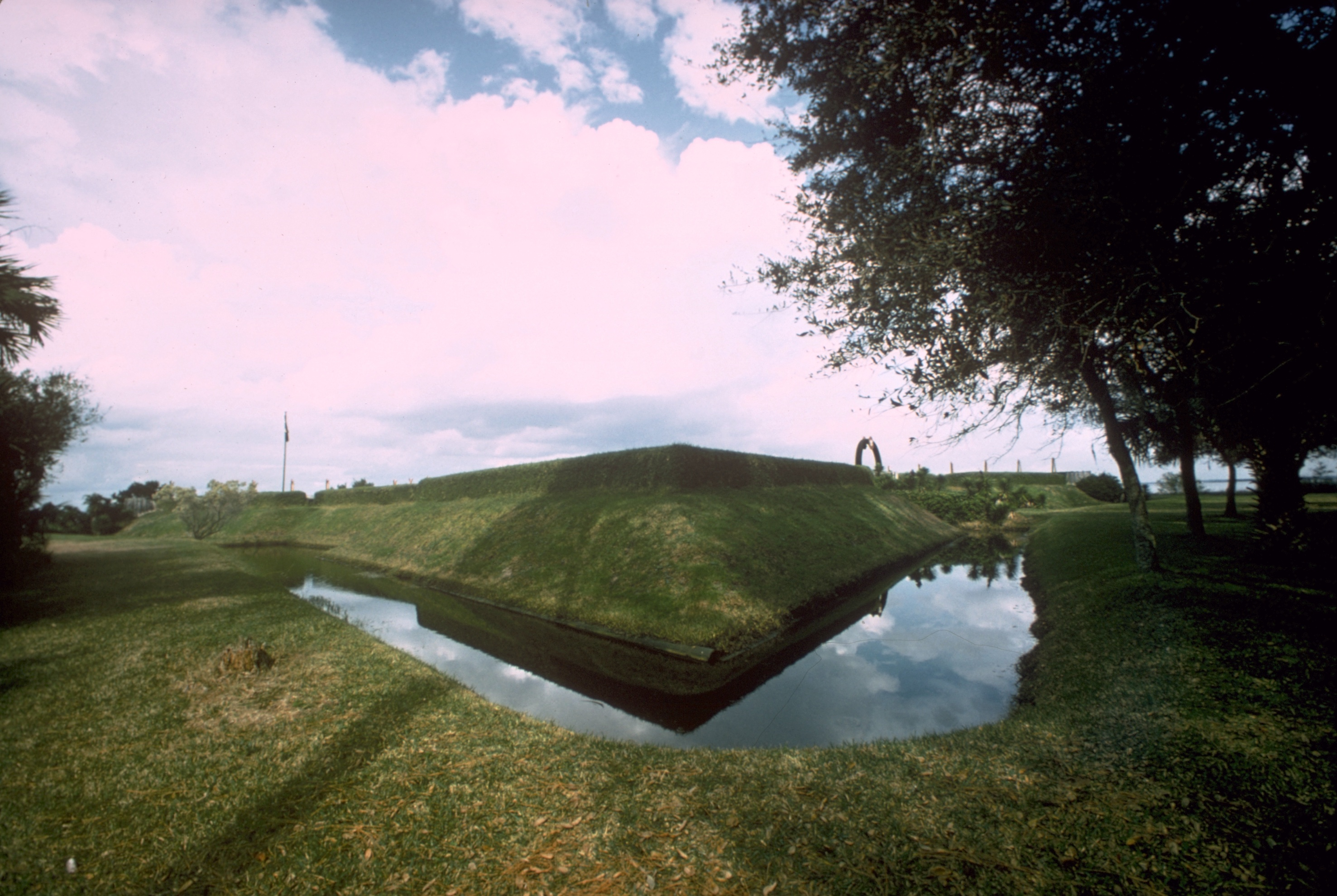
Remnants of Fort Caroline

There were tensions at this time between France and Spain over the French colony of Floride. By the terms of the Papal Bull Inter caetera all of Floride was Spanish territory, and Spain noted that there had been no treaty providing the territory to France. Philip therefore complained of the French presence in the territory, to which the French king replied that he deplored the possibility of his subjects establishing themselves in Spanish territory, but that he would defend their right to free navigation especially in an area 'discovered by the French'. Catherine took this line in her correspondence with the new ambassador to Spain.

In his capacity as ambassador to Spain, Fourquevaux provided information to the French court on the disposition of Spanish galleys in both the Mediterranean and Atlantic. While doing this he also proposed the establishment of a French galley fleet to defend Languedoc and Provence. In Fourquevaux's opinion his governate of Narbonne would be an ideal location for an arsenal. This was in response to a request from the king in December 1565. Charles was concerned that while nominally the Spanish naval force might be intended to go out against the Ottoman Empire it could instead be used to attack the French colony of fort Caroline in Floride. However this fear was misguided, as the Spanish had already destroyed fort Caroline in September of that year, with the survivors of the massacre surrendering in November to the Spanish. Word would not reach France of this until January 1566 while the court was staying in Moulins. Despite the incensed protestations of the French court concerning the Spanish conduct, the kingdom was too weak to ask for reparations from the Spanish. Nevertheless, in March the Spanish king's rationale for undertaking the destruction of Floride française was explained to Fourquevaux by the duke of Alba. Fourquevaux was informed that Spanish ships were continually assaulted by French corsairs which had to be punished. It was not possible to take prisoners due to how few Spanish soldiers were present. Philip wished to preserve the good relations between France and Spain and considered these corsairs not to be the work of the French crown but rather Admiral Coligny. Alba advised Fourquevaux of the necessity of punishing Coligny for his attempts to instil Protestantism among the "simple" indigenous Americans. Fourquevaux was horrified by the 'cruel massacre' that was 'inhuman beyond the behaviour exhibited by barbarians or Turks'. The 'gentle' French behaviour towards the indigenous peoples of America was contrasted with that employed by Spain.

Charles provided a 'firm' memorandum to Forquevaux, which he was to present Philip in which the king took credit for the expedition to Floride and demanded that the Spanish king provide justice to the aggrieved French. Fourquevaux was to be unbending in his presentation of the memorandum to the Spanish king, to prove that Charles was as unyielding as those kings that had come before him. This diplomatic protest did not cause Philip to adapt his policy and Catherine and Charles chose not to continue to push the matter.

A new French expedition in August 1566 intended for Brasil stopped at Madeira for supplies and was fired on by cannons. The enraged French soldiers launched an attack on the capital of Funchal and sacked and pillaged the town. The troops then returned to France, shortly followed by a complaint from Portugal. Charles ordered those who had participated in the outrage to be arrested, but when Coligny defended the conduct of the troops in council, arguing that they had avenged the dishonours being done to France in Brasil, and moreover that they had been attacked first. The royal council therefore changed its opinion, seeing the act as France's avengement. Fourquevaux reported from Spain that it was recognised among the less passionate that the people of Funchal had brought their destruction upon themselves.

Fourquevaux expressed his admiration for the behaviour of Coligny in the Floride episode to the queen of Spain, saying that even if he had been "a Jew or Turk" he would still be worthy of royal favour.

Fourquevaux further advised the crown of a warning from Alba that the kingdom of France would be brought into ruin by its policy of ruin. This inspired the amusement of Catherine who mocked Alba's warning, highlighting how France's troubles were now over and the kingdom existed in peace. Catherine added that this must have come as a frustration to those who hoped for a new conflagration in France to damage the monarchy. For Fourquevaux the 'hope of the Spanish' to see new disorders in France furthered his opinion that their claims to being good Catholics were entirely hypocritical.

The ambassador fumed at the 'duplicitous schemes' of the Spanish secretariat, with whom he had entered mutual agreement as to himself, and the Spanish ambassador in France being able to insert letters they planned to send into dispatches by the opposite parties secretariat. He argued that while he had always held by this, the Spanish secretariat failed to inform him of their dispatches thereby meaning he could not partake in them.

=== Alba's mission ===
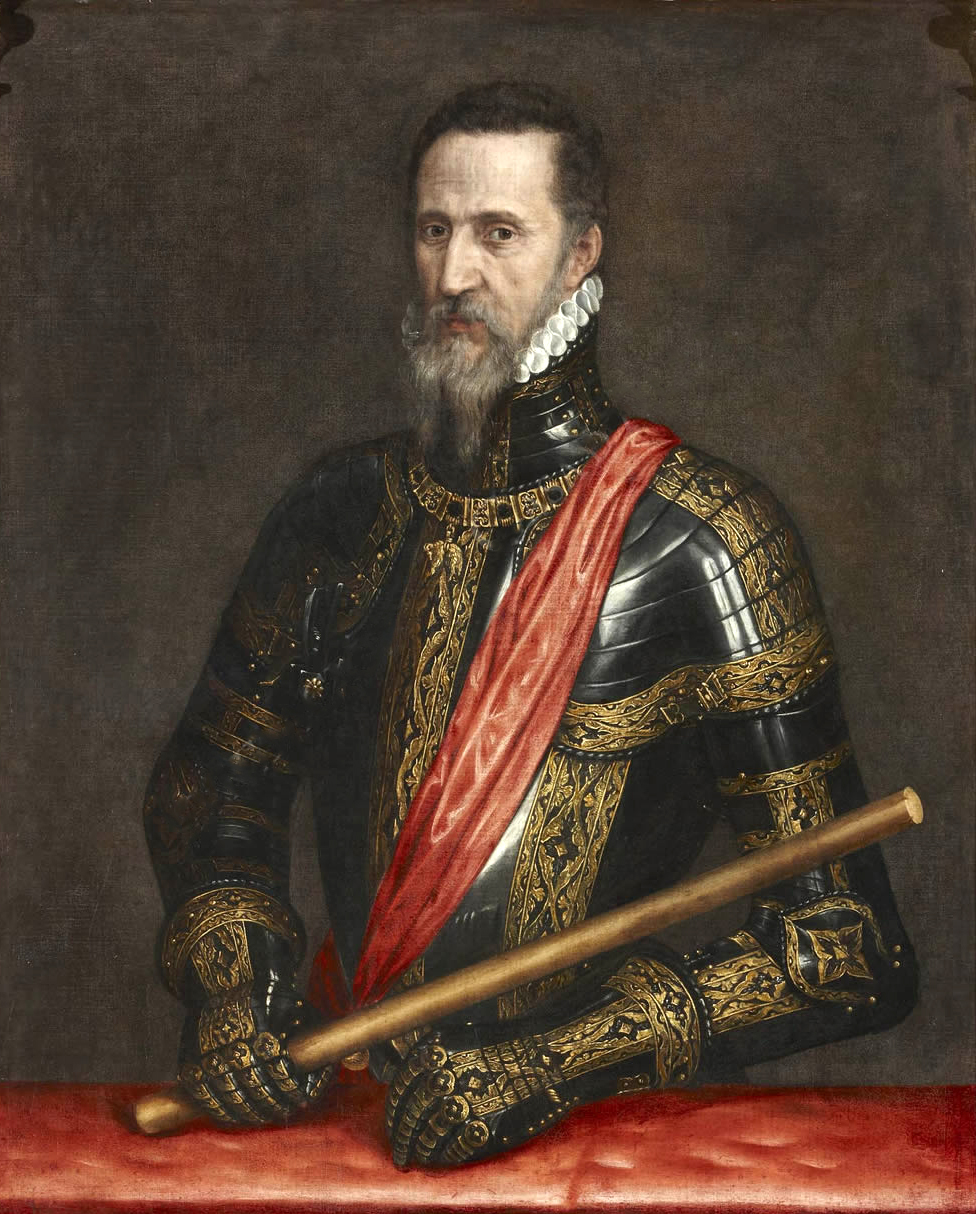
Duke of Alba whose provocative troop movements were a justification for the Protestant assumption of arms in 1567

In November 1566, the duke of Alba outlined his plans for bringing reinforcements to the Spanish Netherlands up the Spanish Road through Savoie, Franche-Comté and Lorraine to Fourquevaux - explaining that because it was winter they would have to bypass the Alpes by traversing the Rhône - in the hope of attaining the French king's permission for the move. Fourquevaux protested to Alba that the Protestants would assume arms if this came to pass. Alba assured Fourquevaux that the presence of the Spanish troops in the kingdom would dissuade such a move. Fourquevaux enquired of Alba whether he could receive support from the Emperor for Philip's problem in the Netherlands. Alba responded that because the problem in the Netherlands was a political and not a religious affair even the Lutheran princes would support Philip in the restoration of order. Nevertheless, Fourquevaux wrote worriedly to Charles to inform him of the plan, speculating that there might be an alternate venue for the Spanish soldiers than the one Alba assured him. This opinion of Fourquevaux was furthered by information he was receiving about Alba borrowing of ships from various Italian powers. The French crown remained keen to divine Alba's 'true' intentions, and it was to this end that Fourquevaux was instructed to figure out the Spaniard's plans on 24 December.

Sometime in 1567, Philip made a request of the French king through Fourquevaux that he provide supplies for the Spanish army as it travelled north. Fourquevaux, afraid of civil war continued to urge caution. After Alba arrived in Bruxelles, the French began to work towards the reinforcement of the Picard frontier. In a further provocation to the Spanish king, d'Andelot was dispatched to the border of Champagne with 6,000 Swiss soldiers the government had raised. Philip had previously attempted to break the alliance of France and the Swiss. Fourquevaux informed Philip of the activities, explaining bluntly that it was the "custom of great kings and princes whenever they saw their neighbors arming, to assure themselves also of their realms".

Fourquevaux made an appeal to the Papal Nuncio in Spain in 1567, urging the Pope to oversee the creation of an assembly for the reform of the Catholic clergy, which would be overseen by the Pope in a fatherly role. Further a national council could be held in France (with the presence of the Pope) to overcome the divisions of the church with the correction of error. With the return of bishops to their diocese they could bring back the Protestants to the fold.

In July he proposed to the king, the raising of a national army without the use of foreign mercenaries. This was to be modelled on the legions of François I, paid for by a tax on the clergy.

=== Second War of Religion ===
The movement of the Spanish troops, among other domestic developments would indeed lead to the Protestant aristocracy assuming arms once more. An attempt was made to capture the royal family by Coligny, the prince de Condé and the other leading Protestants, however this failed, and France was plunged into civil war once more in September 1567. Catherine wrote of her great anger at the 'seditious enterprise' of Meaux to Fourquevaux. The baron was also informed of the queen's great frustration that the crown had been cast back into the troubles from which it had emerged. It was with the resumption of civil war in France that Fourquevaux made his first request to the crown for recall, keen to serve the monarchy in a way more fitting to his conception of the noble ideal.

After the failed coup, Catherine and Charles received offers of military support from the duke of Alba and the Spanish ambassador in Paris Álava. Fourquevaux was entrusted with thanking Philip for these gestures of solidarity. Philip announced his satisfaction to Fourquevaux that his subjects had shown the proper willingness to support and serve the French crown in this matter.

The ambassador bemoaned in October that he was stuck in his diplomatic post when he could offer his services far more usefully to the crown in France. He told Catherine he would aid in the preservation of Languedoc and raise a large force to support the crown in other provinces.

Fourquevaux had responsibility for seeking Spanish aid to support France in the suppression of the new civil war. However Philip was increasingly hesitant on this point, seeing a divergence between his vision for French policy and the French crowns. As the 1560s reached their conclusion Philip would begin to understand that the French policy diverged from his hopes and expectations.

The despatch Fourquevaux delivered announcing the situation in France to Philip emphasised the political nature of the conflict, downplaying its religious component. Philip was of like minds to the French position on this matter, and he reported to Fourquevaux on 25 October his understanding that matters of religion was a cause of rebellion invented by wicked subjects who were looking for a reason to engage in lèse majesté. It would not be until 6 November that Fourquevaux informed Philip that France was in a state of civil war. Fourquevaux reported that Philip was happy to provide his support, but this was conditional on the rebels being brought to a categorical defeat, and not a negotiated settlement. Fourquevaux also requested that the Spanish crown exert pressure on the English queen so that she was not tempted to intervene in favour of the rebels. To show their firm attitude, the despatches Fourquevaux received from the French court developed increasing bellicosity, describing the Protestant rebels as 'scoundrels' 'vermin' and being recipients of 'exemplary punishment'.

Alongside their derogatory language as concerned Protestants, the despatches also emphasised the loss of morale among the rebels after the royal victories. With the approach of the royal army after the victory at the battle of Saint-Denis, the crown reported to Fourquevaux that the Protestants fled from Montereau. Philip was satisfied to hear from Fourquevaux of this new royal attitude, and informed Fourquevaux he was pleased to know of the royal successes. He again stressed the importance to continue this policy towards a final victory. Fourquevaux also noted a general happiness about the news of Saint-Denis around the Spanish court. The angle Fourquevaux had to strike as concerned the Protestants and the war was in direct contrast to the one required for the French ambassador to England.

In December while the second civil war was ongoing Fourquevaux wrote to the king, urging him to understand the folly of coming to any understanding with the Protestants, who were 'bad subjects' that would always be a threat to the crown.

As early as 19 January 1568 Fourquevaux informed the French court that Philip was suspicious that an accord might be reached between the crown and the rebels when he learned of Catherine's recent trip to the army camp of the duc d'Anjou (her son and leader of the royal army). Fourquevaux reassured the Spanish king that Catherine's trip was to steel the royal army for the coming campaign. It would Fourquevaux's job to keep up the façade that no negotiations were being undertaken with the Protestant rebels for as long as possible. According to a despatch written to Fourquevaux on 22 January, those talks that had transpired had been undertaken so that the true intentions of the royal party might be disguised and preparations for the preservation of cities in royalist hands might be assured. To the English by contrast the French ambassador championed and emphasised negotiations that were undertaken with the rebels. Catherine had a violent conversation with the Spanish ambassador Álava who accused her of pushing for peace. Fourquevaux was informed of the dispute but was told only to impart the discord between the queen mother and the ambassador to Élisabeth and not to Philip in an audience. Élisabeth discussed the matter with Philip and then reported to Fourquevaux of Philip's displeasure at his ambassador, and plans to reign him in. By having the problem communicated to Philip via Élisabeth, the French court was able to avoid making it an 'official complaint' that might compromise the countries relations.

In a new audience on 7 February Fourquevaux therefore assured Philip of how far away France was from the possibility of a negotiated settlement. He even worked to try and convince the Spanish court that the royalists were preparing to give battle anew. By this approach he mixed the instructions he received (as late as 1 March) with his own desires. The picture Fourquevaux was provided by the court was deliberately partial in the hopes of pushing him towards specific ends.

With the establishment of the Peace of Longjumeau on 27 March 1568 between the royalists and rebel Protestants, France was once more in internal peace. To announce this peace to Spain the Saint-Héran arrived at the Spanish court on 2 April and held an audience with Philip alongside Fourquevaux. In the audience the notion of a peace was expressed as a possibility, with emphasis placed on all the external parties pushing Charles to consider such (chief among them the Emperor). Philip reacted very poorly to the terms of the peace, describing it as against god, and liable to lead the French crown into disrepute. Nevertheless, decorum dictated that as it was presented as a positive development, that Philip approve of the decision to make peace as a good one, at least during the meeting with Fourquevaux and Saint-Héran. In a further audience on 11 April Saint-Héran and Fourquevaux announced with scarcely any justification the peace that had been concluded at Longjumeau. When she was told of the peace Élisabeth wept, fearing the consequences of it. Fourquevaux saw in the Spanish hostility to the peace a fear that the French might use the opportunity of internal accord to strike out against the Spanish empire. This was in Fourquevaux's estimation disguised under the cloak of disapproval of the toleration of religious deviancy.

=== Revival of marriage negotiations ===
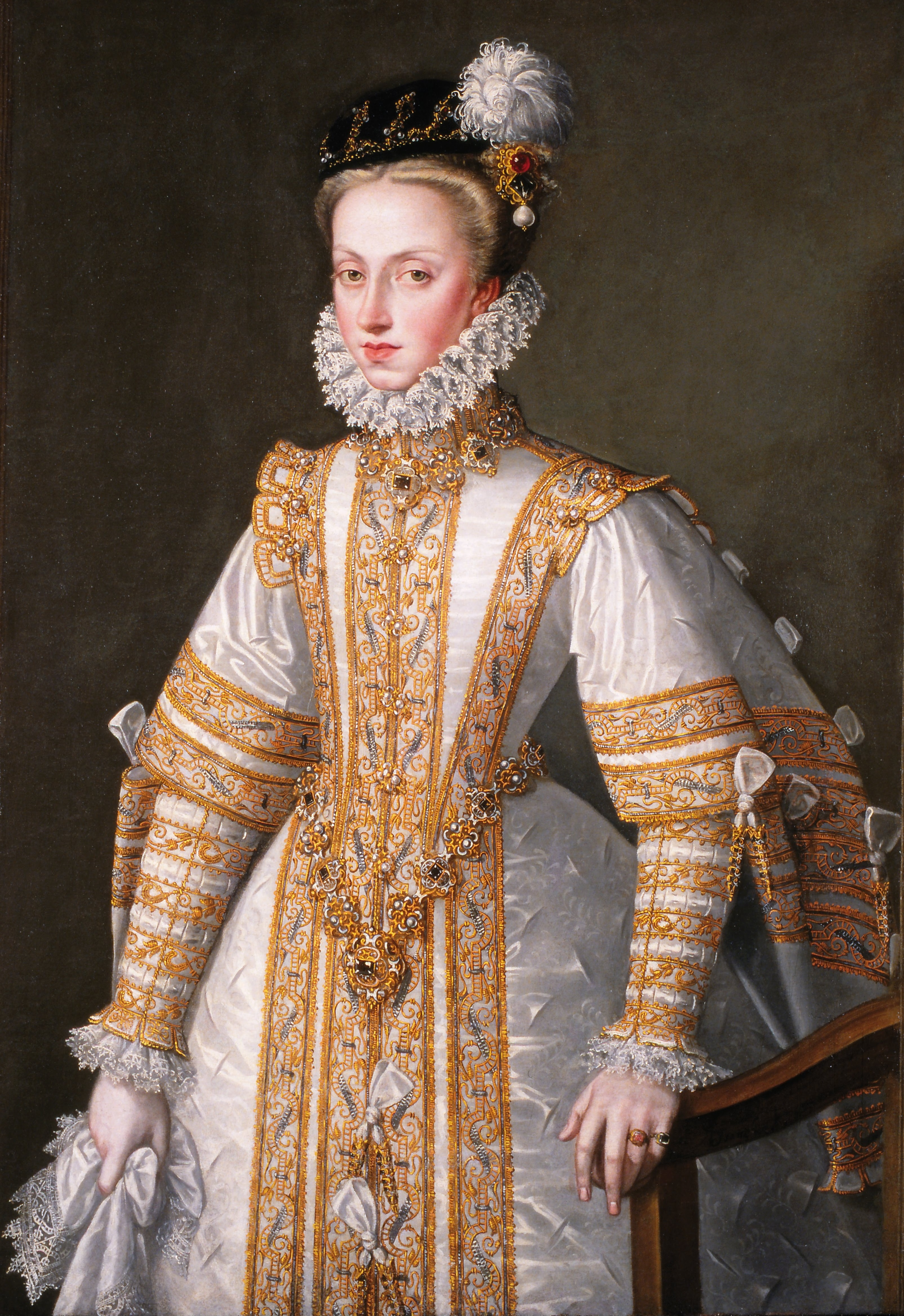
Anna von Österreich eldest daughter of the Emperor and Catherine's desired match for king Charles

In March, Catherine reminded Fourquevaux of her desire to see the fruition of her matrimonial projects. Primarily this meant the marriage of king Charles to a daughter of the Emperor. The imprisonment of Don Carlos in January of that year made the likelihood of arranging a marriage with him fainter. Shortly after the arrest of Don Carlos, the prince of Éboli raised the prospect of a marriage between Charles and a daughter of the Emperor with Fourquevaux. From here the project began to accelerate.

An extraordinary ambassador, the sieur de Gragnague was sent to Spain to assist in the marital negotiations, arriving on 15 June. He and Fourquevaux met together with Éboli, and assured the Spanish prince that the French king and Emperor were of one mind on this arrangement. The confidence of Fourquevaux that the marriage would come to pass was only increased by word of the death of Don Carlos on 24 July. Despite this negotiations became frozen behind the return of a letter Philip had sent to the Imperial court, which failed to materialise. When the response did come, it simply announced the imminent arrival of the archduke of Austria to negotiate with Philip. Fourquevaux feared he may be unaware of Don Carlos' death, or be seeking the hand of the Emperors daughter for himself.

The treacherous nature of the road from his residence in Spain to the French court caused Fourquevaux to reduce his correspondence with the French court for a while in late 1568. The ambassador complained also of the secretive nature of Philip who came to decisions at the last moment. This made it very challenging for Fourquevaux to determine Spanish policy.

=== Third war of religion ===
In August 1568 a 'Holy Calvinist Alliance' was established between the French Protestants and those of the Spanish Netherlands. In September Charles reported to Fourquevaux of the uncovering of a 'new conspiracy against the French state' which was operating under the 'cloak of religion'. Soon thereafter the third war of religion would begin. The anti-Protestant edict of Saint-Maur which was established on 23 September was communicated to Fourquevaux who reported to the crown the delight of Philip on receipt of the news. Spain would see a common cause in the crushing of their respective Protestant rebellions. Philip was aware that the Protestants in the French royal council were among the most keen for an anti-Spanish policy and thus felt driven to interfere in French politics in his own defence. For the French court the interdependence of the two kingdoms Protestant rebellions was a useful measure by which Spain could be pressured to provide support to France. Fourquevaux for his part observed concern in the Spanish court about fallout in Vlaanderen from events in France.

Anger grew at the French court as 1568 drew to a close of the failure of the promised Spanish assistance against the Protestant prince of Orange who invaded France from the Netherlands. This was despite requests for its provision. Orange departed from France in January 1569 and Fourquevaux was entrusted with securing support from the Spanish to see that he could not re-enter the kingdom. He was to further ask that Alba intervene to prevent the arrival of a mercenary force under the pfalzgraf von Zweibrücken (count palatine of Zweibrücken) (which numbered around 17,000). Philip would proffer a small force of a couple of thousand men under Mansfeld however it proved insufficient. Catherine complained to Philip that not only had Alba's force not materialised to provide aid, but the German army had been able to resupply in the Spanish held Franche-Comté, while the duc d'Aumale could not enter the territory to impede them. After receipt of this complaint, Fourquevaux secured from Philip a letter to Alba ordering him to come to the French crowns aid. Gellard argues that while Philip was operating in good faith with Fourquevaux here it did not account for Alba's independence of action.

Another 4,000 troops were promised by the Spanish to assist in Guyenne and Languedoc, and Fourquevaux was regularly tasked with needling Philip as to why this troops had not yet arrived. Despite receiving encouraging words, the troops (which were raised) would never cross the border into France. Fourquevaux believed they had in fact been raised to ensure the security of the border. The force refused to move on the grounds that there was no French escort to bring them into the kingdom. Fourquevaux offered to Philip to personally take charge of a southern French levy to lead the force into France. Dispute over the nature of the escort would continue until June 1570 when Fourquevaux announced to the French force that the 'relief army' was in fact in Granada now. Gellard argues that by now, having been continually let down by the Spanish, the French had little expectation of the receipt of what was regardless a fairly small force. Instead the continued requests from Fourquevaux through the third war for its arrival was a way of demonstrating to the Spanish crown the continue political will in France to bring the war to a victory. It had the further advantage of legitimising the seeking of peace by the French crown when the support failed to materialise.

Unlike during the second war of religion, Fourquevaux was appraised of negotiations that were undertaken between the royal party and the rebel princes in November 1569. However he was only to use the information to answer questions he received. There was a fear that if Fourquevaux was not kept at least somewhat in the loop on these matters it would compromise his position in Spain.

Philip received a competing account of events in France through his ambassador in the kingdom Álava. This manifested in a stream of information that was damaging to Fourquevaux's credibility. By appraising him of the royal negotiations he would be better able to combat the narratives that circulated in the Spanish court. Initially the rumours targeted Catherine specifically, but broadened to the king and wider royal party after the establishment of the edict of Saint-Germain.

In December 1569, Fourquevaux proposed an expedition to Brasil proposed by a Portuguese gentleman, that would secure the kingdom a territory whose riches surpass those of Italia and France. Such an expedition would have been vociferously opposed by the Spanish and Portuguese governments.

Fourquevaux proposed to the crown in January 1570 the establishment of a vast levied army of 50,000 drawn from the cities and countryside. Fourquevaux assured the crown that he would work towards the establishment of such a force in Languedoc. Through this force, the crown would be able to restore its authority by force of arms.

=== Road to peace ===
The groundwork for the establishment of a peace with the rebels was presented to Fourquevaux by the French court in January 1570. Unlike that of Longjumeau a long argument of justification was provided for the ambassador, arguing the necessity of peace on several grounds. Firstly, there were the pressures bought to bear on the crown towards peace by all the peoples of the world. Then there was the matter of the ruin to which France had fallen through civil war in term of its infrastructure, people and also financially. Finally the military situation of the crown was very poor, despite the victories that had been attained in battle at Jarnac and Moncontour. Thus the crown, which had not succeeded in overcoming the rebel Protestants by military force was compelled to seek an alternate solution. Through peace the Protestants could be brought back into the Catholic fold. The failures of Philip to live up to his promises of military aid were also a weapon in Fourquevaux's toolkit for presenting the case for peace.

Fourquevaux was only instructed to broach the subject of negotiations with Philip by a despatch of 7 February. This was so that the topic was only raised with him once the talks were sufficiently advanced. By contrast the negotiations were raised with the English court in December as there was not the trouble of fear over the reaction of the English queen to the news. The two ambassadors also adopted different tacts, the English ambassador reporting that the French king could very easily crush the rebels in the kingdom but was driven by his desire for clemency to move towards peace. Meanwhile, Fourquevaux argued for the impossibility of a military victory.

The ambassador reported to France by early 1570 there was a feeling of satisfaction in the Spanish court that the troubles of civil war continued in France.

When Fourquevaux presented the articles of the peace that was under negotiation to Philip during April, the Spanish king informed him that they were all pernicious as they would allow for the continuation of religious deviancy in France.

In May, Fourquevaux presented a new argument that could be used in favour of the peace to the French crown, after having undertaken an audience with Philip. He highlighted that Philip disapproved of a peace being established that might be to the disadvantage of the French crown, and yet he was open to making such an agreement on similarly poor terms with his own religious rebels, the Moriscos. The French king picked up this argument on 18 June and used it in a despatch to Fourquevaux, highlighting that it was 'strange' given how close to destruction the Moriscos were reported to be by the duke of Alba.

War with Spain was viewed as a fairly simple project by Fourquevaux in a despatch he provided in June 1570. A French army of 12,000 foot and 6,000 horse could depart from Narbonne and march to Sevilla, taking advantage of the weaknesses of the Spanish kingdom and the unpopularity of new taxes to bare witness to a revolt by the local population. After accomplishing the military objectives in Spain, the force would return to France via Bayonne. Through war with Spain, France could rediscover the greatness of the French kingdom and bring about the unification of the French people.

That same month the Spanish ambassador in France caused an incident after reacting with fury after a messenger carrying Spanish despatches was attacked and dispossessed of his communiques. Álava demanded a meeting with Charles and after expressing his frustration at the theft of his despatches and rejecting Charles' explanations, he angrily stated that the French had never done anything to please Philip. This was the fourth diplomatic incident that Álava had induced between 1568 and 1570. Gellard highlights that Fourquevaux was for his part victim of more violent incidents, but did not raise them in any of his correspondence. He therefore sees Álava's decisions to seize upon the robberies of his despatches as a premeditated plan to cause crisis. The historian further argues that Álava's outbursts represent Philip's more sincere opinions of the peace that France was negotiating. After this latest episode Fourquevaux was asked to speak with Philip directly about the behaviour of Álava during an audience. This contrasts with the previous incidents where the French courts issues with Álava were raised indirectly. Philip protested that Álava was just in a rash mood after the theft of his despatches.

In August 1570 the crown established the peace of Saint-Germain-en-Laye. To present this peace to Spain the arguments first put forward in February were picked up. The letters Fourquevaux received announcing the peace were short, as they had been with Longjumeau, the arguments already having been presented months before the peace arrived.

In September 1568, Fourquevaux enjoyed another interview with Éboli, and reassured Catherine that Éboli saw a marriage between Charles and the Emperors daughter as a definite thing, and urged a little patience before it came to pass.

=== Philip the bachelor ===
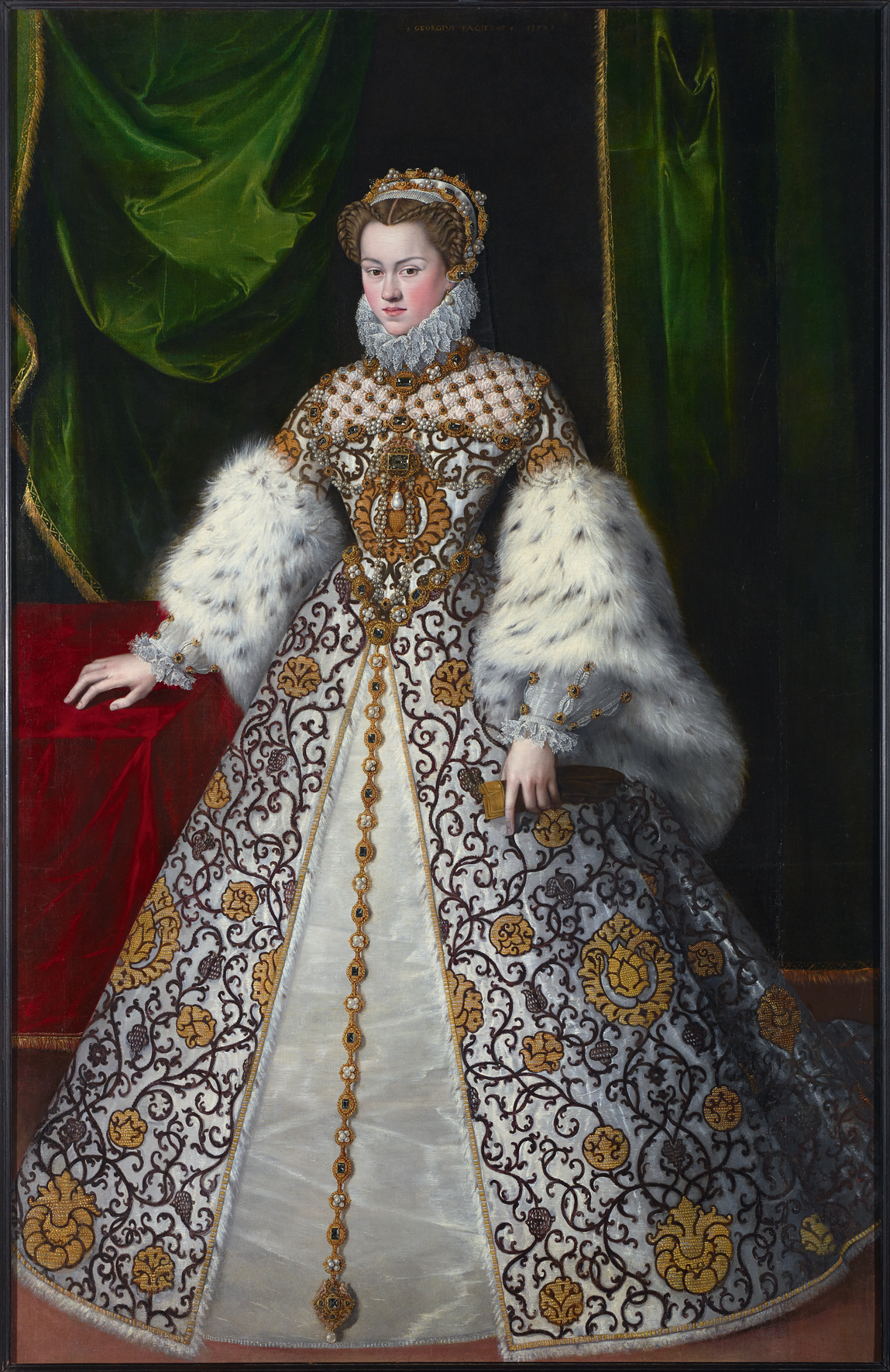
Elisabeth von Österreich second eldest daughter of the Emperor and Philip's proposed match for Charles after his widowing

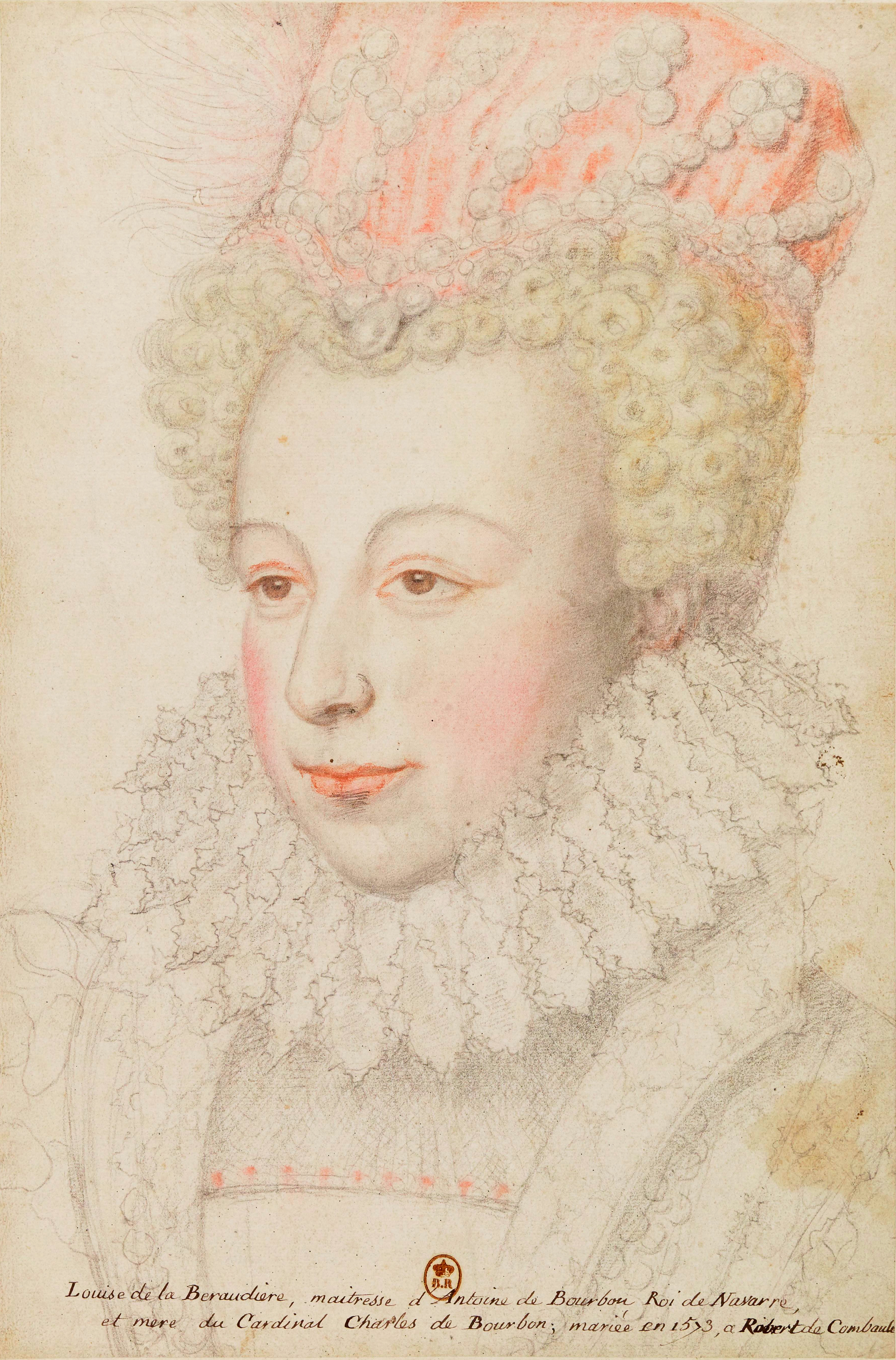
Marguerite de Valois, daughter of Catherine proposed as match for Philip, and proposed by Philip to marry the king of Portugal

After the death of her daughter Élisabeth in October 1568, Catherine quickly moved to undertake new marriage negotiations with Spain through the conduit of Fourquevaux. For Fourquevaux the death of the Spanish queen, alongside that of Don Carlos in the same year was the cause of a significant increase in his expenditure. In addition Élisabeth's death made his diplomatic mission more challenging due to the support she had offered and the role of conduit she had undertaken. While Élisabeth was alive her correspondence had allowed diplomatic talks to go on without the calling of an audience (which was locked behind receipt of despatch from France) allowing for a greater continuity of diplomacy. Going forward Fourquevaux had to look to cardenal de Espionsa or the secretario de estado (secretary of state) Gabriel de Zayas. Due to Philip's frequent absences from Madrid, it would not always be easy for Fourquevaux to utilise Philip's advisers.

Philip, without a male heir, was keen to quickly remarry. Catherine desired for another of her daughters, Marguerite to take the late Elisabeth's place as husband to the Spanish king. This would ensure the alliance between France and Spain was preserved. The Spanish had different plans, proposing Marguerite for the king of Portugal while Philip would remarry to Anna von Österreich. Catherine opposed this proposal, arguing that only a marriage between the Spanish king and Marguerite could preserve the bond between the kingdoms. She ordered Fourquevaux to burn her letter after having read it to Philip.

In October Fourquevaux held an audience with Éboli and tried to establish that the death of Élisabeth could not mean that Philip would go back on his word to see Charles married to the Emperors' eldest daughter. Éboli informed him that it was likely Philip would be seeking Anna's hand now, leaving the younger daughter Elisabeth for Charles. Fourquevaux was informed similarly by Zayas Catherine wrote back to Fourquevaux with disappointment at this new proposal, stressing the importance that Philip and Marguerite be established together.

In late November Catherine outlined the strategy Fourquevaux was to undertake. He was to win over Zayas, Éboli and Espinosa, alongside any other figures deemed important by Fourquevaux, by bribery if necessary. Catherine stressed that Fourquevaux was to present the project in such a way as it would not appear to be Catherine's design as marriage proposals must be seen as the initiative of men. Therefore, when Fourquevaux broached the topic with Éboli he informed the prince he was speaking 'without charge'.

From October to December, Fourquevaux met with Éboli five times, Zayas three times, Espinosa twice, with the king's confessor Bernardo de Fresneda twice and once with the former viceroy of Naples Juan Manrique de Lara. Though he also met with the Spanish king during this time, marital talks were not raised, remaining in back channels for the moment. In these talks, he emphasised the betrayal that would be felt if Philip went back on his word for Charles to marry with Anna, and further the positive relations that could be ensured through Philip receiving a French match. All those Fourquevaux spoke with assured him Philip wished to maintain his accord with France. The seigneur de Lignerolles who was at the Spanish court at this time, received report that Philip's commitment to France had only been furthered by the death of his wife. However they stated Philip was not yet ready to remarry. Zayas noted to Fourquevaux that it would be strange for Philip to marry two sisters. Espinosa remarked that Philip needed to look to Anna as her age was more suitable for him than the Emperors' younger daughter. Thus Philip would ultimately spurn the French proposal and take the Habsburg match with the Emperors' elder daughter Anna. By this means Spain began to disengage from its French alliance, through the loss of a personal bond tying the two kingdoms together, and the betrayal of the promise given to Charles.

Despite assuring Fourquevaux that the Emperor's daughter Elisabeth would be married to Charles, the prince in fact wrote to the Portuguese offering her to the Portuguese king Sebastian.

In the first half of 1569 the cardinal de Guise was despatched to Spain as an extraordinary ambassador to assist Fourquevaux in further marriage negotiations. He arrived on 25 January. Catherine had written to Fourquevaux of the cardinals arrival in November, but informed him to be cautious in what he tells the cardinal.

Cardinal de Guise had an audience alongside Fourquevaux with Philip on 31 January and announced that the French expected Philip to honour his promise to see Anna married to Charles. Philip asked their proposals be given to him in writing. Guise and Fourquevaux went again to meet with Philip on 9 February and complained that Charles was being left in a limbo by this ambiguity, and could Philip declare whether he intended to marry Anna or not. Philip again did not provide a response and asked for their speech to be provided in writing. Espinosa invited Fourquevaux and Guise to dinner on 17 February and informed them unofficially that the Spanish king hoped to marry the Emperors daughter Elisabeth to Sebastian. It was advised by Espinosa not to immediately communicate this to France as it did not come from Philip. The two ambassadors waited until they received a new dinner invitation from Espinosa on 27 February. He informed them Charles would receive one of the Emperors' daughters (he did not state which one even though it was obvious by this point of Philip's match to Anna), and that Marguerite could marry Sebastian.

=== Charles and Elisabeth ===
On 22 March, Catherine wrote her acquiescence to the marriage of Charles with Elisabeth. Fourquevaux's despatches made it clear that a marriage between Marguerite and Philip was not a possibility. Having been informed of Fourquevaux's scepticism that Philip truly intended a match between Marguerite and Sebastian, Catherine requested negotiations for that marriage be conducted in parallel to that of Charles' and that the Portuguese king be made aware of this. A response within three months from Philip was requested, though the months would pass without response from Philip.

With months having gone by without response on the marriage questions. Fourquevaux had an interview with Espinosa in which the latter advised him against seeking out Philip. Fourquevaux therefore wrote to Philip on 28 June, only to be told by Philip that he would respond when he was back in Madrid on 4 July. On 5 July Espinosa summoned Fourquevaux to provide the Spanish response. The marriage of Charles and Elisabeth was endorsed, as was that of Marguerite and Sebastian. The emperor wished for the marriages of his two daughters Anna and Elisabeth to occur simultaneously and in Madrid. The French court received news of the success of the marriage between Charles and Elisabeth on 6 July and wrote to Fourquevaux to ensure that the marriages would be conducted as soon as possible. Fourquevaux was tasked with requesting an audience with Philip at which to insist that the marriages occur before November. He was also to simultaneously conduct the negotiations for the marriage of Marguerite, which could not be treated separately.

In August Éboli assured him of Philip's desire to see the marriages conducted before winter, and perhaps as early as October. The French ambassador informed Philip of the powers to negotiate the two marriages that had been vested in him by Charles on 26 August to the delight of the Spanish king. However much to Fourquevaux's frustration there would be delays on the Portuguese front of the negotiations, and Fourquevaux protested to Philip that it was he who had proposed the match in the first place. Philip for his part apologised for the delays with receiving the powers to negotiate the marriage from Sebastian, pleading the youth of his nephew and a plague in Lisbon which had forced the dispersal of the Portuguese court. He promised to send a new letter of request to Sebastian on the matter. Come the end of September however, no progress had been made with Portugal. Fourquevaux was disconcerted to learn that two couriers had returned from Portugal but that their arrival in Spain had been kept a secret from him. Having reported this to the French court he was ordered to ignore it. Zayas pled with Fourquevaux that Sebastian was experiencing an illness. On 26 September Sebastian wrote to Philip that he would provide the document of authorisation if the French satisfied all his concerns. The Portuguese king also wrote to his mother Dona Joana that he had no intention of marrying Marguerite. Frustration grew both for Fourquevaux and at the French court, Charles writing to Fourquevaux on 26 October to remind him that the marriages must be negotiated together. Nevertheless, on 15 October Philip had proposed to Fourquevaux that the marriages be treated separately. Fourquevaux informed Philip that this was contrary to his orders, but was told that it made sense to start with the most important marriage given the delays with Portugal.

On 19 October negotiations open between Fourquevaux and Adam von Dietrichstein the representative of the Emperor. Fourquevaux protested during the negotiations that he could not negotiate the marriage separately from that of Marguerite's. Fourquevaux disputed with the delegates he was arrayed with as to the size of the dowry, proposing 400,000 écus (crowns) to be equivalent to that of the late Élisabeth. The Spanish and Imperial delegations proposed instead 100,000 écus, which was the amount Philip had accepted for Anna. After a few days of talks (with three meetings) the negotiations were concluded. Fourquevaux was also informed of a Portuguese diplomatic mission to France, and that Philip was planning a new effort with Sebastian. On 5 November the articles of marriage are sent to the French court, with rejoicing upon their receipt. Fourquevaux was richly praised by Charles and Catherine for the negotiations he had undertaken, but it was nevertheless stressed that Fourquevaux should emphasise the importance of Marguerite's simultaneous marriage. On 12 January 1570 the marriage was concluded after the Emperor had given his approval and the articles had been corrected. Despite this development several days later the royal despatch still insisted on the two marriages being simultaneous. After writing to the court to inform them the marriage had been concluded on 17 January, the final preparations were not for Fourquevaux to undertake. Pomponne de Bellièvre would attend the proxy marriage at Speyer on 12 October 1570.

Fourquevaux did not apologise to the crown for the failure to maintain the marriages of Charles and Marguerite as a single unit. The demands that they be treated collectively was the official hard line position for communication to Philip. Gellard speculates whether he may have received oral instructions offering him greater flexibility on this point, or whether he was just forced into the concession by circumstances. Catherine would not question his decision and likely understood it was outside of his control.

=== Sebastian and Marguerite ===
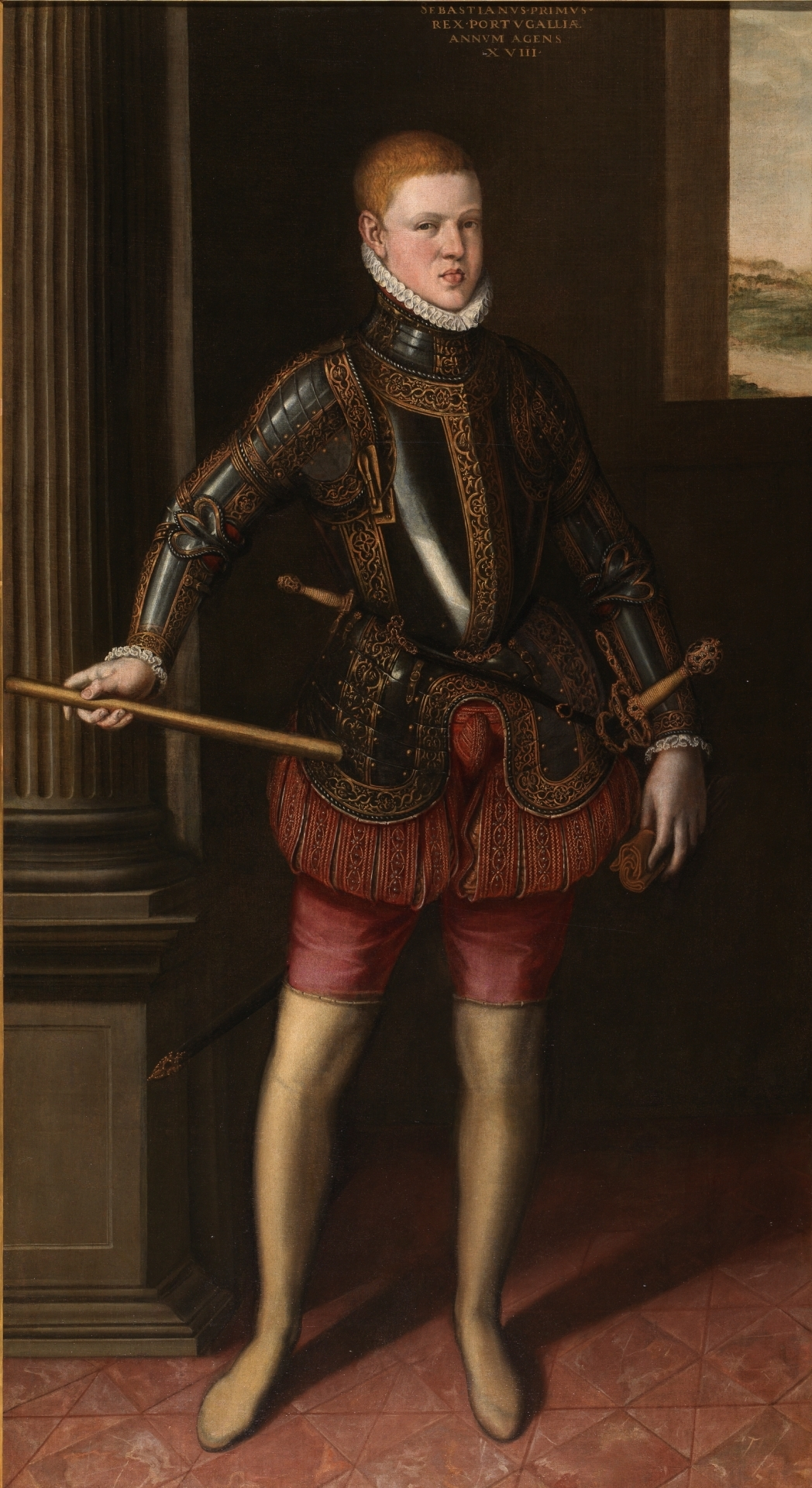
King of Portugal Sebastian who would avoid marriage with the French princess Marguerite

In January Fourquevaux was informed by Espinosa that the new Spanish outreach to Sebastian would succeed. Charles complained to Fourquevaux at how long the process was taking and wondered if there was some other reason for the delays. Fourquevaux announced to Catherine on 3 February that the Portuguese noble dom João de Mascarenhas would be travelling to the French court to this end. Fourquevaux had determined that the purpose of Mascarenhas travel was to examine whether Marguerite's Catholicity. The ambassador then outlined all points of contention between France and Portugal to Catherine. Gellard sees this particular despatch as almost placing the French court in the subordinate role, reliant on Fourquevaux for information about Portuguese affairs. Fourquevaux had sent two agents to Portugal in these months towards determining Portuguese designs, the first in December 1569 the latter in April, each on an alternative pretext.

As 1570 continued, Fourquevaux fed back to France the rumours he had heard about affairs in Portugal. He noted that the fourteen year old king was surrounded by young advisers who were giving him poor advice. He further stated that Sebastian had mental problems akin to those of the late Don Juan. Two advisers, the Camara brothers feared that Marguerite's independent spirit could pose a threat to the influence they enjoyed over the young monarch. He built up a picture of two of the king's advisers who were roadblocks to the marriage. Nevertheless, the Portuguese king consulted the Portuguese Cortes which showed a majority of cities in favour of the match. Further issue lay in the fact the marriage was to be negotiated in Spain, as the understanding between Sebastian and Philip was not as strong as Fourquevaux had been led to believe. Sebastian did not appreciate that his marriage negotiations had been begun by his uncle without his involvement. It presented the spectre of Spanish domination of his kingdom.

On 19 April Fourquevaux was informed through Zayas and Espinosa that Philip had been unable to secure from Sebastian the right to negotiate a marriage for him, and the Portuguese were concerned for the health of their king and wished to wait as concerned marriage. By this means, Philip ended his participation in the negotiations. Charles vented his frustration to Fourquevaux in June, bemoaning that no prince was treated with less respect than he. It was rumoured that a secret article of the peace with the Protestant rebels involved the marriage of Marguerite with the Protestant king of Navarre. Having heard this the Pope moved to throw all his effort behinds the marriage between Marguerite and Sebastian. To this end a Papal diplomat was given the mission of seeing the match came to pass and he arrived in Madrid towards the end of April. He assured Fourquevaux that he had been entrusted with seeing it came to pass. Received by Sebastian in June, the envoy returned to Fourquevaux in July and greatly satisfied him in a recounting of what he had undertaken. He confirmed that it was the councillors Fourquevaux had suspected who were inhibiting the marriage. The Papal envoy then returned to Portugal but was again informed that Sebastian would not be marrying presently and that Marguerite would have to wait. Just as he was preparing to leave the Portuguese court, a letter arrived from the Pope which softened the king to the prospect of marriage. Fourquevaux lacked the details however and assumed the letter Sebastian wrote to the Pope was to ask him to mediate the marriage. After reading Sebastian's response a few days later however, which barely held any mentions of marriage Fourquevaux's opinion soured on the Papal envoy. The French court shared his opinion that the envoy was more an agent of Philip's than the Popes.

Efforts towards the Portuguese match were further hampered by reports that the king was 'too delicate to marry' and preferred ecclesiastical pursuits. Fourquevaux worked hard to dispel this impression, assuring Catherine that the king was 'healthy and robust' and that his lack of interest in women was in fact an asset for the marriage.

Fourquevaux suspected that the young king of Portugal's mother doña Juana was more in favour of a match with the third daughter of the Emperor for her son. In October 1570, Fourquevaux speculated on the possibility that Sebastian and Philip had colluded to some common design to deceive the French crown.

Negotiations for a marriage between Marguerite and Sebastian were drawn down in January 1571. Fourquevaux was informed that he was no longer to speak on the subject with Philip outside of mentioning the vague desire that Marguerite find a suitable husband. Nevertheless, Fourquevaux would continue to appraise the French court of changes in the composition of the Portuguese council, noting the dismissal of one of the opponent advisers to the match and the king's increasing closeness to his grandmother Juana. By the latter half of the year, as Marguerite's match to Navarre became increasingly finalised, Charles informed Fourquevaux he lacked any interest in continuing to pursue this line of enquiry. The great patience Fourquevaux and the French party had shown in seeking this marriage despite the lack of movement on it from the other side was for several reasons. Chief among them was its importance in ensuring the tying together of all the Catholic princes. There was also the fact that the match had been formally proposed by Philip, and thus it was important to avoid blame for its collapse. The withdrawal of efforts was roughly contemporaneous to the beginning of marriage negotiations with England. Fourquevaux reported to France on the latter in August that the Spanish 'laughed' at the idea of a marriage between the English queen Elizabeth and the king's brother Anjou. Philip did little to convince the French court that he was not to blame for the failure of the marriage and the damages to Charles' honour. Gellard speculates this may mean that by this point he saw little value in his alliance with France.

Marriage between Marguerite and Navarre was officially proposed by the baron de Biron in July 1571. Fourquevaux was entrusted with announcing the match to Spain in September. Charles' despatch to Fourquevaux on the topic did not hesitate to cast blame on Philip for the situation and the humiliation of the French king.

Entrusted with defending the marriage of Marguerite and Navarre in August 1571, the French king provided Fourquevaux with an argument in the marriages favour. He made it clear however that if Fourquevaux was challenged on the prospect of the marriage he was to present this argument as his own, and not as part of the royal despatch.

=== Royal conseiller ===
During 1570 Fourquevaux was inducted into the royal conseil privé (privy council) as a councillor.

By 1570, Fourquevaux was among those who constituted the council of the king's brother Anjou. Alongside Fourquevaux in this group were the comte de Retz; Villequier, the sieur de Lignerolles; the lieutenant-general of basse-Normandy, Matignon; the governor of Poitou, the comte de Lude; the reiter commander Schomberg and the ambassador to the Swiss Confederation Belliėvre. All these men were associated with Catherine. As a result of this, Anjou was described in this period as a 'mignon' of his mother.

Indeed, in the contemporary text Discours merveilleux de la vie, actions et deportemens de Catherine de Médicis there are alleged to be five prince elements of her government: the former ambassador to Spain the baron de Saint-Sulpice, the lieutenant-general of Dauphiné Maugiron, the lieutenant-general of Languedoc Joyeuse, the sécretaire d'état Villeroy and the current ambassador to Spain Fourquevaux.

=== Collapse of the Franco-Spanish alliance ===
It was reported by Fourquevaux in March 1571 that it was the will of the duke of Savoy that France would devote its financial resources to supporting Savoy in opposition to Admiral Coligny's 'schemes'.

In April 1571 Fourquevaux was provided a complaint by the French king to represent in front of the Spanish king. Charles protested the seizure of a French Protestants ship by Spanish pirates. It was to be stressed that a law-abiding Protestant subject of the king was just as much under the king's protection as a Catholic one.

As early as 2 August 1571, Charles requested the dismissal of the Spanish ambassador to France Álava. This was on the grounds Álava was maintaining a subversive network in many places of the kingdom. Fourquevaux was ordered to demand his removal at this time but it did not come to pass. A new request for Álava's dismissal came on 14 October with Fourquevaux to characterise the ambassador's actions as 'stirring up seditions' towards the end of dividing the French people and destroying the peace. On 13 November Álava would depart the French court without taking his leave of the king.

The French crown increasingly flirted with the prospect of supporting the Protestant rebels in the Spanish Netherlands in 1571. To this end secret talks were undertaken with the rebel leader Nassau in September by Catherine and the king. Nevertheless, Catherine ill desired a war with Spain. Therefore, in October Forquevaux was tasked with reassuring Philip of France's peaceable intentions. According to what Fourquevaux was to inform the king, the talks with Nassau had been in service of convincing him to not invade the Netherlands.

For the French court, the priority of persuading the Spanish court through Fourquevaux to dismiss the attacks on France that multiplied in Madrid and to this end Charles informed Fourquevaux that he would be sure to detail his decisions in greater detail. Alongside this role it was important that Fourquevaux kept Philip on board with the idea of Franco-Spanish friendship at this time.

=== Return to Narbonne ===
Fourquevaux's appeals to be relieved were finally answered in 1571. He was due to be replaced as ambassador to Spain by the sieur de la Marque, however his replacement died the day he arrived in Madrid on 27 November. It would be several more months before a new replacement could be sent out in early 1572.

In February 1572 Fourquevaux retired from his role as ambassador to Spain, having served in the role for over six years. He was replaced in the charge by the marquis de Pisany. Pisany arrived to take up his position on 23 February. Fourquevaux rejoiced to be free of his 'Egyptian captivity'. Upon his return to France he was rewarded with the position of surintendant de la maison du roi (superintendent of the king's household) over the household of the young king of Navarre. He would never exercise this charge, preferring that of governor of Narbonne.

That same year Fourquevaux retired from his role as the governor of Narbonne. He was replaced in the charge by the baron de Rieux.

In 1573 Fourquevaux summarised the situation in Languedoc in the wake of the Saint Bartholomew's Day massacre to the king. He reported that 90% of the population were Catholics, but there remained Protestants among the non-noble grandees, the merchant class and those young people who had a humanist education or were 'friends of liberty'.

=== Governor of Toulouse ===
Fourquevaux was briefly established as the governor of Toulouse, serving in the post from January to June 1573. His nomination to the post came at the request of the governor of Languedoc, the baron de Damville who was trying to establish a military network in the area. Fourquevaux enjoyed poor relations with the administration of the city of Toulouse. The city justified this attitude by its privileges and their dislike for the governor Damville's attempt to impose his influence on the city. Therefore, Fourquevaux was only able to stay in the sénéchaussée for a couple months before being obliged to leave. This meant he was unable to raise the kind of military force he had envisioned. Unable to mobilise income from the diocese of Toulouse towards his force, and as a result his army lacked wages. Beyond this the diocese under Fourquevaux authority refused to pay his own wages or compensate him for advances he made from his personal revenues to troops under his command. Towns under his authority refused garrisons, claiming they were unnecessary. Leaving Toulouse he fought in the fourth French War of Religion, serving in the Lauragais during the winter and then at Fronton. He enjoyed overall responsibility for the war in west Languedoc while Damville and Joyeuse were fighting in the more competitive eastern areas of the province.

Souriac argues Damville's attempt to militarily impose himself over Toulouse through first Fourquevaux and then Savignac in the period 1572 to 1574 was a failure.

In the wake of the failed royal attempt to reduce La Rochelle in 1573 Fourquevaux strongly opposed the establishment of peace between the crown and the Protestants. The only result of such a peace could be to inspire further seditions. If the Protestants were not extirpated the population of Languedoc would be left in misery. Moreover, there was a risk of the common people seeing the Protestants as their allies due to the cruelties and exploitation of the Catholic soldiery.

The baron sent a request to the court in the December of that year to receive 27,000 écus (crowns, around 60,000 livres) that he claimed he was owed by the crown, the failure of which to be paid had come to his injury.

On 7 February 1574, Fourquevaux wrote to the crown that his principal and sole desire was to see the monarchy restored to the authority and prestige it had enjoyed during the reigns of François I, and Henri II.

=== Damville the rebel ===
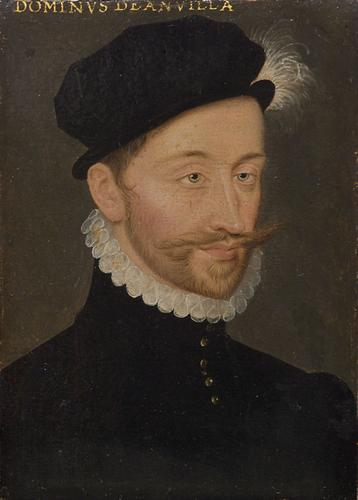
Baron de Damville and governor of Languedoc who would first use Fourquevaux as a piece of his power building in the province before fighting with him in 1574

In May 1574 Fourquevaux and Joyeuse received correspondence from Catherine through Saint-Sulpice and Villeroy instructing the pair to oversee the arrest of Damville and transport him north to the French court.

With Damville in rebellion, Fourquevaux aided in the preservation of Narbonne from an attempted surprise attack before going on the offensive and re-capturing Leucate in June from a subordinate of the rebel governor.

In the final year of his life, Fourquevaux appeared before the Estates of Languedoc. In his address he informed the assembled delegates of the situation among the bishops of the province. According to the baron, Narbonne had not seen a resident bishop since 1513, and this was the norm for the region, with fourteen of the eighteen bishops absentees (excluding the four Protestant bishops of the province). That of Toulouse, the cardinal d'Armagnac was absent in Avignon, that of Saint-Papoul was in Rome, that of Lavaur in Paris and that of Montauban at the French court. In Fourquevaux's estimation there was only one bishop who could be considered a 'good shepherd', that of Comminges. By this absenteeism a good portion of the religious troubles are created as the sacrament is administered ignorantly causing the people to hold their ministers in contempt. Gellard sees his deploring of absenteeism as an example of how for Fourquevaux the greatest priority was obedience to the crown, not partisan Catholicism.

He condemned Protestants for their rebellion, but also those Catholics who had ties with the Protestants and chose to use the circumstances to make away with the tithe. He saw some Catholics as working in concert with the Protestants to bring about the exploitation of Languedoc.

Fourquevaux proposed that governors should be rotated to new charges every three years to reinforce the king's authority over the charges which was weakened by their heritability and voluntary resignations in favour of chosen successors.

=== Death ===
On 3 July 1574, Fourquevaux drew up his will. In it he declared that he had made his name illustrious across Europe, but had failed to accrue any other benefit to his name. He died while in Narbonne.

== Sources ==
- Babelon, Jean-Pierre (2009). Henri IV. Fayard.
- Baird, Henry (1880). History of the Rise of the Huguenots in Two Volumes: Vol 2 of 2. Hodder & Stoughton.
- Baumgartner, Frederic (1986). Change and Continuity in the French Episcopate: The Bishops and the Wars of Religion 1547-1610.
- Carpi, Olivia (2012). Les Guerres de Religion (1559-1598): Un Conflit Franco-Français. Ellipses.
- Chevallier, Pierre (1985). Henri III: Roi Shakespearien. Fayard.
- Cloulas, Ivan (1979). Catherine de Médicis. Fayard.
- Crété, Liliane (1985). Coligny. Fayard.
- Durot, Éric (2012). François de Lorraine, duc de Guise entre Dieu et le Roi. Classiques Garnier.
- Duvauchelle, Christine (2023). "Lettre de Charles IX au baron Fourquevaux, ambassadeur de France en Espagne". Les Guerres de Religion 1559-1610: La Haine des Clans. In Fine Éditions d'art.
- Gellard, Matthieu (2014). Une Reine Épistolaire: Lettres et Pouvoir au Temps de Catherine de Médicis. Classiques Garnier.
- Gould, Kevin (2016). Catholic Activism in South-West France 1540-1570. Routledge.
- Greengrass, Mark (1983). "The Anatomy of a Religious Riot in Toulouse in May 1562". Journal of Ecclesiastical History. 34 3.
- Haan, Bertrand (2023). "Ambitions Européenes". Les Guerres de Religion 1559-1610: La Haine des Clans. In Fine Éditions d'art.
- Harding, Robert (1978). Anatomy of a Power Elite: the Provincial Governors in Early Modern France. Yale University Press.
- Heller, Henry (1991). Iron and Blood: Civil War in Sixteenth-Century France. McGill-Queen's University Press.
- Jouanna, Arlette (1998). "Fourquevaux". In Jouanna, Arlette; Boucher, Jacqueline; Biloghi, Dominique; Le Thiec, Guy (eds.). Histoire et Dictionnaire des Guerres de Religion.
- Jouanna, Arlette (1998b). "Le Temps des Guerres de Religion en France (1559-1598)". In Jouanna, Arlette; Boucher, Jacqueline; Biloghi, Dominique; Le Thiec, Guy (eds.). Histoire et Dictionnaire des Guerres de Religion.
- Jouanna, Arlette (2015). The St Bartholomew's Day Massacre: The Mysteries of a Crime of State. Manchester University Press.
- Knecht, Robert (1996). The Rise and Fall of Renaissance France. Fontana Press.
- Knecht, Robert (2000). The French Civil Wars. Longman.
- Knecht, Robert (2014). Catherine de' Medici. Routledge.
- Le Roux, Nicolas (2000). La Faveur du Roi: Mignons et Courtisans au Temps des Derniers Valois. Champ Vallon.
- Le Roux, Nicola (2015). Le Crépuscule de la Chevalerie: Noblesse et Guerre au Siècle de la Renaissance. Champ Vallon.
- Le Roux, Nicolas (2022). 1559-1629 Les Guerres de Religion. Gallimard.
- Potter, David (1997). The French Wars of Religion: Selected Documents. Palgrave Macmillan.
- Romier, Lucien (1913). Les Origines Politiques des Guerres de Religion I: Henri II et L'Italie (1547-1555). Librairie Académique Perrin et Cie.
- Romier, Lucien (1913b). Les Origines Politiques des Guerres de Religion II: La Fin de la Magnificence Extérieure, le Roi contre les Protestants (1555-1559). Librairie Académique Perrin et Cie.
- Serigny, Louis Pierre de Hozier de (1741). Armorial Général, ou Registres de la Noblesse de France. Registre Second. Première Partie. Firmin Didot.
- Shimizu, J. (1970). Conflict of Loyalties: Politics and Religion in the Career of Gaspard de Coligny, Admiral of France, 1519–1572. Geneva: Librairie Droz.
- Souriac, Pierre-Jean (2008). Une Guerre Civile: Affrontements Religieux et Militaires dans Le Midi Toulousain (1562-1596). Champ Vallon.
- Sutherland, Nicola (1962). The French Secretaries of State in the Age of Catherine de Medici. The Athlone Press.
- Sutherland, Nicola (1980). The Huguenot Struggle for Recognition. Yale University Press.
- Thompson, James (1909). The Wars of Religion in France 1559-1576: The Huguenots, Catherine de Medici and Philip II. Chicago University Press.
