= Georges de Villequier =

French courtier

- vicomte de La Guerche
- Villequier family coat of arms
- Born: c. 1556
- Died: 10 February 1592
- Spouse: Louise Le Jay
- Father: Claude de Villequier
- Mother: Renée d'Applainvoisin

Georges de Villequier, vicomte de La Guerche (c. 1556 –10 February 1592) was a courtier, governor and military commander during the latter French Wars of Religion. The son of Claude de Villequier and Renée d'Applainvoisin, Villequier entered royal service with various positions in the household of the king and his brother Anjou. In December 1571 he got into a dispute with another of Anjou's favourites, Lignerolles. The two dueled and La Guerche killed him. During Anjou's tenure as king of the Commonwealth La Guerche enjoyed the position of Maître de la garde robe for the king, however he was unable to continue this position when Anjou became king of France as Henri III. In 1580 he assisted Alençon in his attempt to become king of the Netherlands during the negotiations for the specifics of his kingship with the Dutch States General.

La Guerche was upset by the king's decision to assassinate the duke of Guise in December 1588 and affiliated himself with the Catholic ligue in opposition to the king. As a result, when the ligueur lieutenant-general of the kingdom was looking for a governor for the city of Poitiers, around which La Guerche had influence due to his royal governorship of the Basse Marche, the commander of the Château was able to secure his appointment by Mayenne in exchange for providing the Château to the ligue. The ligueur city was not happy about the choice, and their frustration deepened when La Guerche proved unable to achieve military success against the royalists. In January 1591 the ligueur residents of the city attempted a coup against him and the commander of the Château. Though they were talked down the inward facing parts of the Château were dismantled. In August, while La Guerche was out campaigning against the royalists, a movement rose up in the city to refuse him re-entry. He snuck back into the city but the council told him to leave again. On 10 February 1592, he was caught up in a skirmish in La Guerche itself, and killed.

== Early life and family ==
Georges de Villequier was born around 1556, the son of Claude de Villequier and Renée d'Applainvoisin. La Guerche married Louise Le Jay.

He had a reputation as a spendthrift and difficult character, Henri III eventually tired of him due to his abrasive behaviour.

== Reign of Charles IX ==
=== Anjou ===
In 1569, during the combats of the third civil war La Guerche received appointment as guidon of Anjou, brother of the king's, ordinance company. Having previously been a member of Charles' household, La Guerche and his father abandoned him in favour of his brother Anjou household. La Guerche served the king as a gentilhomme de la chambre before directly transferring to become a gentilhomme de la chambre and Chambellan to the duke of Anjou.

=== Lignerolles ===
One of Anjou's early favourites, Lignerolles was much hated by Protestants, who saw him as an archetype of a corrupting influence on the mind of a prince. On 10 December 1571 he was killed by La Guerche. Contemporary Protestants in 1572 saw the death as the silencing of one of the architects of the 'premeditated' Massacre of Saint Bartholomew. Jean de Saulx did not buy this retrospective explanation, instead seeing it as a manifestation of internal conflict in the ducal household, Lignerolles and the Villequiers being rivals for Anjou's affection. Given La Guerche killed Lignerolles in the context of a duel, this is more likely.

With the election of Anjou as king of the Commonwealth, those of his household made their preparations to travel east with him. La Guerche acquired silk from Parisian merchants for the purpose of his brides' Trousseau. La Guerche would be among the principal members of the new king's household in the Commonwealth.

== Reign of Henri III ==
Upon his return to France, now styling himself Henri III, the former brother to the king had to allocate the various royal offices. Henri chose to distribute them to many of those who had served with him in the Commonwealth. The position of Maître de la garde-robe was granted to Gilles de Souvré. This upset the Villequiers, as the role had been possessed by La Guerche in Henri's capacity as king of the Commonwealth.

=== Sixth civil war ===
Forced to resume the civil wars by the Catholic ligue, Henri broke off the Peace of Monsieur. His brother Alençon, who had been with the rebels in the previous war was keen to demonstrate his loyalty. Henri granted him command of the royal army for the campaign against the Protestants. La Guerche decided against joining the former rebel prince in the campaign, staying with the court in Poitou. As the campaign continued, the lack of funds the royal army possessed slowly disintegrated the force, until by September 1577 it was no longer a fighting force. Henri took the opportunity to bring the war to a close with the harsher Treaty of Bergerac, satisfying and suppressing the ligue.

In 1578, Henri established a new order of chivalry, conscious of the dilution of prestige that now accompanied the Ordre de Saint Michel. To this end he created the Ordre du Saint-Esprit. La Guerche would be made a chevalier in this new most prestigious order.

=== Alençon ===
He continued his association with Alençon after the conclusion of the sixth civil war. Alençon was not satisfied with his position as a mere prince, and desired to be a king in his own right. To this end he entered negotiations with the Dutch States General for his selection as their king. In negotiations that took place in September 1580 La Guerche was among the notables who represented the prince in discussions with the Dutch delegates. Alongside him was La Châtre, Marshal Cossé and the duke of Elbeuf. The negotiations were fraught, with Alençon's representatives trying to shape the Dutch kingship to have as broad a remit as possible. Alençon set off the following year to assume his responsibilities.

While he had previously served as Chambellan for the duke of Anjou, he was granted the office in the year 1580 in Henri's capacity as king of France.

=== Ligueur ===
Due to the assassination of the duke of Guise Henri found himself at war with the Catholic ligue in 1589. In response he allied with his Protestant heir Navarre, who would become Henri IV on Henri III's death on 1 August. Navarre had consolidated much of Poitou and this alliance much aligned the ligue. La Guerche for his part denounced the assassination and affiliated himself with the ligue. Those ligue aligned grandees in Poitou called for La Guerche to come to their aid against the royalists in the province. Due to this treason, Henri relieved him of his authority as the governor of the Basse Marche.

== Reign of Henri IV ==
=== Poitiers ===
The duke of Mayenne, in his ligueur capacity as lieutenant-general of the kingdom was keen to secure the loyalty of the sieur de Boisseguin, who commanded the Château of Poitiers. As a condition for his support Boisseguin asked that La Guerche be appointed as governor of the city, a request to which Mayenne acceded. In July he appointed him the ligueur governor of Poitiers. La Guerche had attempted to gain access to Poitiers back in May, but the city had refused him entry. He finally entered the city on 14 August. Concerned about the resistance the city had presented him in granting him the office, he oversaw the printing of an official commission for him from the ligueur candidate for king (who was in royalist captivity) Charles X.

In his capacity as governor he arranged a limited local truce with royalists in the area of Couhé. As ligueur governor La Guerche had responsibility to preside over the rebel 'Union Council' that controlled many of the affairs of the city and planned military strategy.

La Guerche quickly found the city of Poitiers in opposition to him, due to his poor military performance. He had failed to win Limoges for the ligue in 1589, and was chased by the royalists back from Belac in 1591. In December Mayenne was compelled to write to the leaders of Poitiers to get them to work more smoothly with La Guerche. Despite these efforts in January leading members of the city administration attempted a coup against him, to seize the Château. Boissegun refused to yield the Château, so the rebels took La Guerche prisoner and began firing cannon at the fortress. After some negotiations the conflict was resolved peacefully, with the Château being dismantled on the city side of the fortification.

He was forced on the defensive by attacks from Henri's cousin the prince of Conti who advanced into suburb of Cueille Mirebalaise during July 1591. When news arrived that the young duke of Guise had escaped his royalist captivity in August 1591, the leaders of the city quickly began campaigning for him to take over as governor from La Guerche. La Guerche was at this time out of the city campaigning, and illegal assemblies began plotting in the city at rumour that he might soon return. The city grandees met and decided in response to the opposition they would refuse him entry. Nevertheless, La Guerche slipped back into the city secretly on 17 September. An urgent meeting was held in response, that examined La Guerche's recent behaviour, including the stationing of troops not far from the city. The meeting concluded that La Guerche was to be asked to leave to fight with the main ligueur army. Despite this ultimatum the city authorities lacked the ability to expel him, and on 27 September he attended a meeting of the Union Council.

=== Death ===
On 10 February 1592 La Guerche was conducting a skirmish with royalists in his personal seignurie . He was killed as he and allied nobles attempted to cross the river in a boat. He was succeeded as ligueur governor of Poitiers by Marshal Brissac.

== Sources ==
- Bernstein, Hilary (2004). Between Crown and Community: Politics and Civic Culture in Sixteenth-Century Poitiers. Cornell University Press.
- Constant, Jean-Marie (1984). Les Guise. Hachette.
- Constant, Jean-Marie (1996). La Ligue. Fayard.
- Holt, Mack (2002). The Duke of Anjou and the Politique Struggle During the Wars of Religion. Cambridge University Press.
- Le Roux, Nicolas (2000). La Faveur du Roi: Mignons et Courtisans au Temps des Derniers Valois. Champ Vallon.
- Sutherland, Nicola (1980). The Huguenot Struggle for Recognition. Yale University Press.
