= Philibert Le Voyer =

French courtier and diplomat

Philbert Le Voyer, sieur de Lignerolles (died 1571) was a French courtier and diplomat. The name "Le Voyer" is sometimes spelled "Boyer" or "Bois". Lignerolles is in the Haut Perche in Normandy.

He was the son of Jean Le Voyer, seigneur de Lignerolles and Jeanne de Surmont.

He married Anne de Rodulph or Anna Cabriana de Guyonnière, (sometimes called Louise), a daughter of Emilio Cabriana of Mantua and Estiennette du Plantis. Their children included:

- Catherine Le Voyer de Lignerolles, who married René du Bellay, sieur de la Flotte.

Lignerolles traveled as ambassador to Scotland in August 1567 with the Earl of Moray and lodged in Harry Kinloch's house in the Canongate. He was unable to secure a meeting at Lochleven Castle with the captive Mary, Queen of Scots. He returned to London and had an audience with Elizabeth I on 3 September. He told the Spanish ambassador, Guzman de Silva, that Edinburgh Castle and the jewels of Mary, Queen of Scots would be surrendered to Moray.

He was killed at Bourgueil on 10 December 1571 by Georges de Villequier, vicomte de la Guerche. The English ambassador Henry Killigrew wrote that it was a "set matter and foul murder", and Villequier gained a royal pardon on the same day, because Lignerolles was a vocal opponent of the Anjou marriage.
