= Countess Charlotte Brabantina of Nassau =

Duchess of Thouars (1580–1631)

Countess Charlotte Brabantina
- Duchess consort of Thouars
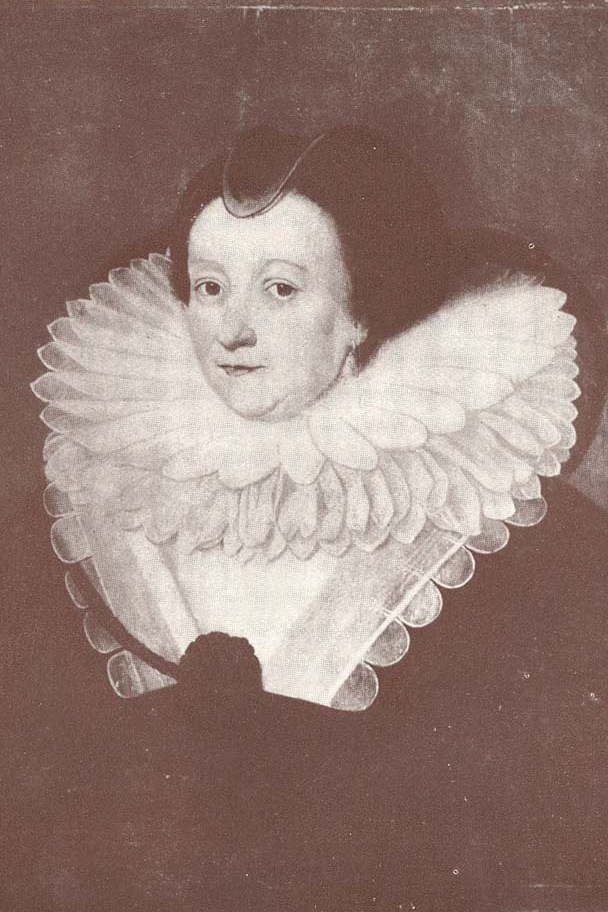
- Countess Charlotte Brabantina of Nassau
- Born: 17 September 1580; Antwerp
- Died: August 1631 (aged 50–51); Château-Renard
- Noble family: House of Orange-Nassau (by birth); House of La Trémoille (by marriage)
- Spouse: Claude de La Trémoille
- Issue: Henry de La Trémoille; Charlotte de La Trémoille; Élisabeth de La Trémoille; Frédéric de La Trémoille, comte de Laval
- Father: William the Silent
- Mother: Charlotte of Bourbon

Countess Charlotte Brabantina of Nassau (Antwerp, 17 September 1580 – Château-Renard, August 1631) was the fifth daughter of William the Silent and his third wife, Charlotte of Bourbon. She lived in her life at the French royal court and performed many successful assignments as a mediator.

== Life ==
She and her sisters lost their mother in 1582 and their father in 1584 and were taken care of by their stepmother Louise de Coligny, with whom they had a very good relationship.

In 1594 Louise introduced the elder sisters Elisabeth and Charlotte Brabantina at the court of Henry IV of France in order to find French Huguenot spouses for them. Elisabeth married the Duke of Bouillon in 1596 and Charlotte Brabantina married Claude de La Trémoille in 1598. She was described as a beauty and called La Belle Brabantine. She was widowed in 1604.

Charlotte Brabantina divided her life between the Thours castle, the French royal court and the Dutch court in The Hague, and was well liked by Henry IV, Marie de' Medici and Louis XIII. Being well liked by most and with good connections, she was often given assignments as a mediator. She acted as a mediator during the conflict between the Duke of Bouillon and Henry IV. She also acted as a mediator in the negotiations resulting in the Treaty of Loudun in 1616. Louis XIII appointed her to chair the synod between the French reformed churches in Vitry in May–June 1617.

She maintained a correspondence with her stepmother and her sisters, who were also often politically active, and they often referred to themselves as 'femmes d'état' or female "statesmen".

== Ancestry ==
Ancestors of Countess Charlotte Brabantina of Nassau

16. John IV, Count of Nassau-Siegen
8. John V, Count of Nassau-Siegen
17. Mary of Looz-Heinsberg
4. William I, Count of Nassau-Siegen
18. Henry III, Landgrave of Hesse
9. Elisabeth of Hesse-Marburg
19. Anna of Katzenelnbogen
2. William the Silent
20. Henry IX, Count of Stolberg
10. Bodo III, Count of Stolberg-Wernigerode
21. Mathilde of Mansfeld
5. Juliana of Stolberg-Wernigerode
22. Philip I of Eppstein
11. Anna of Eppstein-Königstein
23. Louise de La Marck
1. Charlotte Brabantina of Nassau
24. John VIII, Count of Vendôme
12. Louis, Prince of La Roche-sur-Yon
25. Isabelle de Beauvau
6. Louis, Duke of Montpensier
26. Gilbert, Count of Montpensier
13. Louise de Bourbon, Duchess of Montpensier
27. Clara Gonzaga
3. Charlotte of Bourbon
28. Philippe de Longvy, Lord of Givry
14. Jean de Longwy
29. Jeanne de Bauffremont
7. Jacqueline de Longwy
30. Charles, Count of Angoulême
15. Jeanne of Angoulême
31. Antoinette de Polignac
