= Charles, Prince of La Roche-sur-Yon =

Prince of La Roche-sur-Yon (died 1565), Governor, and French Military Commander

Charles de Bourbon
- Prince de La Roche-sur-Yon
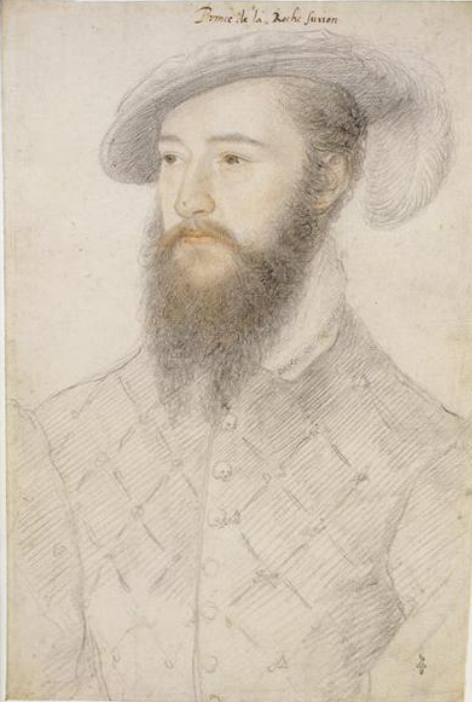
- Portrait of La Roche-sur-Yon by François Clouet
- Born: c. 1515
- Died: 18 October 1565
- Noble family: House of Bourbon-Montpensier
- Spouse: Philippe de Montespedon
- Issue: Henri, Marquis de Beaupré
- Father: Louis de Bourbon, Prince of La Roche-sur-Yon
- Mother: Louise de Bourbon, Duchess of Montpensier

His coat-of-arms.

Charles de Bourbon, Prince de la Roche-sur-Yon, (c. 1515 – 10 October 1565), was a Prince of the Blood and provincial governor under three French kings. He fought in the latter Italian wars during the reign of Henri II, commanding an army during the 1554 campaign into the Spanish Netherlands.

Upon the death of Henri II in 1559, he found himself gaining favour under the insecure Guise regime, who were keen to ensure they had the support of the princes. La Roche-sur-Yon was granted first a place on their council, and with the regime battered by the Conspiracy of Amboise he was granted a super-governorship centred on the Duchy of Orléans. Governing his charge with a moderate religious policy, Catherine de Medici was keen to court him when she assumed the regency for her young son Charles IX upon the premature death of François II.

Receiving the governorship of the city of Paris in 1561 he again demonstrated his tolerance of Protestantism allowing prêches to occur without the intervention of the authorities even though they were technically against the law. During the Riot of Saint-Medard his officials would blame the Catholics for starting the violent confrontation, which proved a bridge too far for the Catholics at court. Catherine excised him from the governorship in January 1562 in favour of François de Montmorency.

With the death of François, Duke of Guise at the hands of an assassin during the siege of Orléans, La Roche-sur-Yon was granted his governorship of Dauphiné, authority in the province itself flowing first through Laurent de Maugiron and then the baron de Gordes before La Roche-sur-Yon died in October 1565, the province being taken over by his brother Louis, Duke of Montpensier.

== Early life and family ==
He was the second son of Louis de Bourbon, Prince of La Roche-sur-Yon, and Louise de Bourbon, Duchess of Montpensier his elder brother being the Louis, Duke of Montpensier.

He married in 1544 to Philippe de Montespedon, dame de Beaupré († 1578), but their children predeceased him:

- Henri, Marquis de Beaupré († 1560)
- Jeanne (1547 † 1548)

== Reign of Henri II ==
He served with his elder brother Louis, Duke of Montpensier, in the wars against Emperor Charles V, in Provence (1536), Artois (1537), in Roussillon (1542) and Champagne (1544). He was captured near Chalons-sur-Marne. Released, he was part of the expedition charged with defending Metz, besieged by Charles V in 1552.

=== Campaign of 1554 ===
Frustrated by the paltry gains of the campaign of 1553, Henri organised a vigorous campaign for the following year. Three armies were prepared and instructed to advance into the southern Spanish Netherlands. Henri's favourite Anne de Montmorency commanded the largest, with smaller supporting armies under François I, Duke of Nevers and La Roche-sur-Yon. Together they devastated the country, capturing several fortresses during the summer. In July the three armies unified and Henri rode out to lead the combined force himself. He was involved in the siege of Renty while a small shadowing force under François, Duke of Guise inflicted a shocking defeat on the imperial army sent to relieve the town.

== Reign of François II ==
=== Place on the council ===
At the advent of the young François II's reign, he and his cousin Cardinal Bourbon were tasked with conducting Elisabeth of Valois to Spain to marry king Philip II, a term of the Peace of Cateau-Cambrésis. As a result, he was largely absent from France during the consolidation of the Guise government. The Guise were keen to win his support for their regime, and offered him a place on the conseil privé.

=== Conspiracy of Amboise ===
The fledgling government was seriously shaken by the Conspiracy of Amboise the following year. The Guise, suspecting La Roche-sur-Yon's cousin Condé of involvement sought to isolate him and his brother Navarre. To this end they created two super-governorships in the centre of the kingdom for the Bourbon-Montpensier princes. For Montpensier, Touraine was combined with Anjou, Vendôme, Maine, Blois and Dunois. For his brother La Roche-sur-Yon, Orléans was combined with Berry, Beauce and Montargis. To serve under La Roche-sur-Yon, the sieur de Sipierre was selected as lieutenant-general. When an Assembly of Notables met in August 1560 to address the kingdoms financial and religious problems, La Roche-sur-Yon and his brother were among the many notables present, the only leading nobles absent being Condé and Navarre.

=== Governor of the Orléannais ===
As governor of this large region of the interior, La Roche-sur-Yon sought to chart a moderate religious line. While instructing the Protestants of his territory not to gather in public or under arms, he promised that he would not interfere if they held private assemblies. To the pastors he urged restraint, until such a time where Protestants represented a large enough part of the French population that public worship could be considered.

== Reign of Charles IX ==
=== Governor of Paris ===
In 1561 he received further advancement, being made governor of Paris. In this role he ignored the desperate pleas of the Parlementaires and militant Catholics of Paris to crack down on the Protestant prêches. However, in the wake of the Riot of Saint Medard in which the arresting officers suggested the Catholics had started the riot, his position became untenable among the Catholic elite. Replacing him in the role was Marshal Montmorency, consolidating the Montmorency clans hold on the region.

=== Toleration ===
With Catherine leading the regency government in the direction of open toleration with the Edict of January, the Parlement of Paris reacted with fury, remonstrating the court to make Protestantism fully illegal. La Roche-sur-Yon was tasked by Catherine with presenting the courts response to Parlements request, in which the court appealed to the crisis of the moment as making toleration a practical necessity regardless of whether it was moral.

During the French wars of religion, he served in the royal army and took part in the sieges of Bourges and Rouen (1562).

=== Governor of Dauphiné ===
Upon the assassination of the Duke of Guise at the siege of Orléans, a new governor was required for Dauphiné and the crown selected La Roche-sur-Yon to fill the vacancy. Laurent de Maugiron was confirmed as his lieutenant general, and in La Roche-sur-Yon's absence from his governorship was empowered to act with the powers of governor. Maugiron was a militant Catholic and the court was displeased by the way he governed Dauphiné and during the royal tour pushed him out in favour of the baron de Gordes.

In July 1563, he was invited by Guise to serve as a counsellor to the betrothal of the duke of Longueville who had abjured Protestantism, and Marie de Bourbon, duchesse d'Estouteville. Alongside him were Condé and Cardinal Bourbon. The Guise hoping to isolate the Montmorency and in particular Gaspard II de Coligny who they blamed for the assassination of the duke of Guise.

In October 1565 he died, and was succeeded as governor of Dauphiné by his brother Montpensier.

== Sources ==
- Baumgartner, Frederic (1988). Henry II: King of France 1547-1559. Duke University Press.
- Carroll, Stuart (2005). Noble Power during the French Wars of Religion: The Guise Affinity and the Catholic Cause in Normandy. Cambridge University Press.
- Carroll, Stuart (2009). Martyrs and Murderers: The Guise Family and the Making of Europe. Oxford University Press.
- Harding, Robert (1978). Anatomy of a Power Elite: the Provincial Governors in Early Modern France. Yale University Press.
- Roelker, Nancy (1996). One King, One Faith: The Parlement of Paris and the Religious Reformation of the Sixteenth Century. University of California Press.
- Taulier, Jules (1859). Notice historique sur Bertrand-Raymbaud Simiane, Baron de Gordes. Impremiere Maisonville.
- Terrebasse, Humbert (1905). Histoire et généalogie de la famille de Maugiron, en Viennois, 1257-1767. L Brun.
- Thompson, James (1909). The Wars of Religion in France 1559-1576: The Huguenots, Catherine de Medici and Philip II. Chicago University Press.
