= Louise, Duchess of Montpensier =

Duchess of Montpensier (1482–1561)

Louise
- Duchess of Montpensier
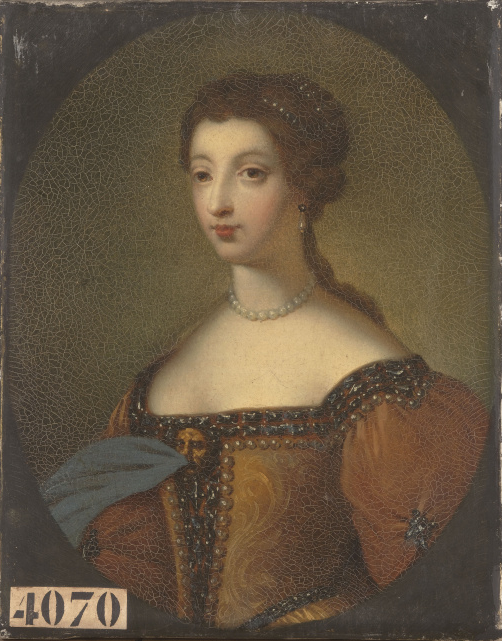
- Louise, Duchess of Montpensier, copy by Joseph Albrier, 1840, of a 17th-century anonymous portrait
- Born: 1482
- Died: 15 July 1561
- Noble family: Bourbon-Montpensier
- Spouses: Andre III de Chauvigny; Louis, Prince of La Roche-sur-Yon
- Issue: Suzanne of Bourbon; Louis, Duke of Montpensier; Charles, Prince of La Roche-sur-Yon
- Father: Gilbert, Count of Montpensier
- Mother: Clara Gonzaga

Louise (1482 – 15 July 1561) was the Duchess of Montpensier, suo jure from February 1538 to 1561.

== Inheritance ==
Louise was the eldest daughter of Gilbert, Count of Montpensier, and Clara Gonzaga. Her paternal grandparents were Louis I, Count of Montpensier and Gabriele de La Tour d'Auvergne. Her maternal grandparents were Federico I Gonzaga, Marquess of Mantua and Margaret of Bavaria. Her five younger siblings included Charles III, Duke of Bourbon. He was killed in battle in May 1527 when he led the Imperial troops sent by Emperor Charles V against Pope Clement VII in what became the Sack of Rome.

By dint of her three brothers having died childless, Louise became the heiress to the county of Montpensier and the dauphinate of Auvergne. The estates, however, had been sequestered by the French King Francis I (at the instigation of his mother, Louise of Savoy) when her brother Charles, Duke of Bourbon and Constable of France formed an alliance with Charles V. After the Duke's death at the siege of Rome, his fiefs were confiscated by the King. On 17 May 1530, she became the suo jure Duchess of Châtellerault, Countess of Forez, Baroness de Beaujeu, which had formed part of her brother Charles' inheritance, however the titles were revoked by the King in January 1532. Eventually some of her late brother's inheritance was restored to her. In February 1538, Louise was invested as Duchess of Montpensier, Dauphine of Auvergne, Baroness de La Tour and de la Bussière by King Francis.

== Marriages and children ==
In 1499, Louise married her first husband, Andre III de Chauvigny, prince of Deols and vicomte de Brosse (d.1503). The marriage was childless.

Louise married secondly on 21 March 1504, her cousin Louis, Prince of La Roche-sur-Yon. They had:

- Suzanne of Bourbon (1508–1570), married Claude de Rieux, Count of Harcoute and Aumale, by whom she had issue.
- Louis, Duke of Montpensier, (10 June 1513- 23 September 1582) married firstly in 1538, Jacqueline de Longwy, Countess of Bar-sur-Seine (died 28 August 1561). His second wife was Catherine of Lorraine
- Charles, Prince of La Roche-sur-Yon (1515–1565), married Philippe de Montespédon, Dame de Beaupreau (died 1575), by whom he had a son, Henri, and a daughter, Jeanne.

Louise died on 5 July 1561. She was buried at Sainte-Chapelle, Champigny-sur-Veude in Touraine. Her eldest son Louis succeeded her as Duke of Montpensier.

== Sources ==
- Ramsey, Ann W. (1999). Liturgy, Politics, and Salvation: The Catholic League in Paris and the Nature of Catholic Reform, 1540–1630. University of Rochester Press.
- Ward, A.W.; Prothero, G.W.; Leathes, Stanley, eds. (1934). The Cambridge History Modern History. Vol. XIII. Cambridge at the University Press.
