= La Mabilière =

Coordinates: 47.0421°N 0.3715°E

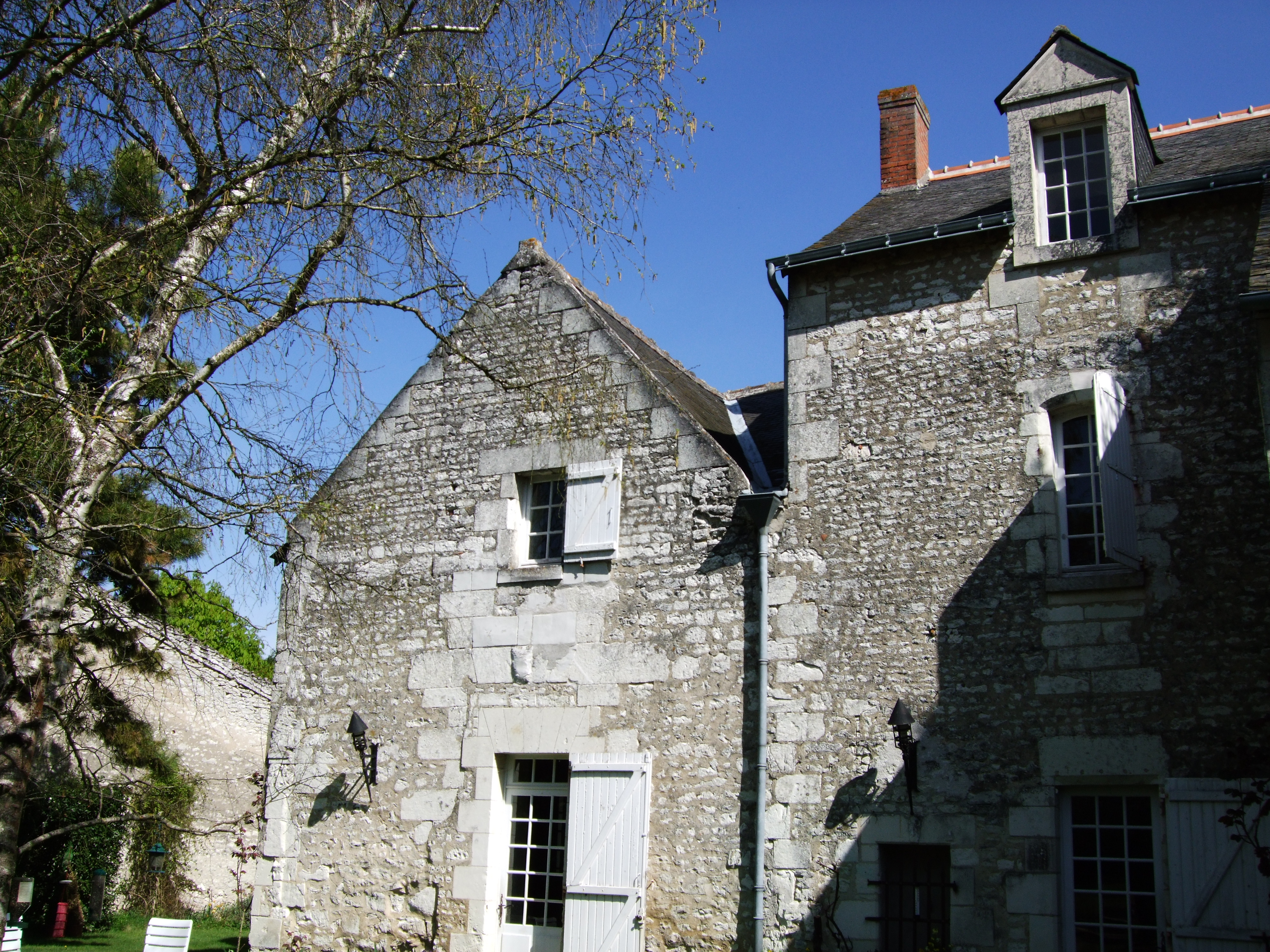
La Mabilière

La Mabilière is the property of an old farm in Courcoué, near Richelieu, in Indre-et-Loire department in the Centre-Val de Loire region of France, which was formerly a castle, manor and noble house. The estate is first mentioned in 14th-century documents and was formerly a fief of Poitou. It was fortified by Jehan Poret in the 15th century with a bailey and a drawbridge; by the early 19th century these had been removed, but until about 1945 one half-demolished defensive turret remained, serving as a dovecote. This collapsed when an adjacent building was demolished. One of the three towers still stood in 1956, in use as a dovecote and with a hipped roof added.

== Location ==
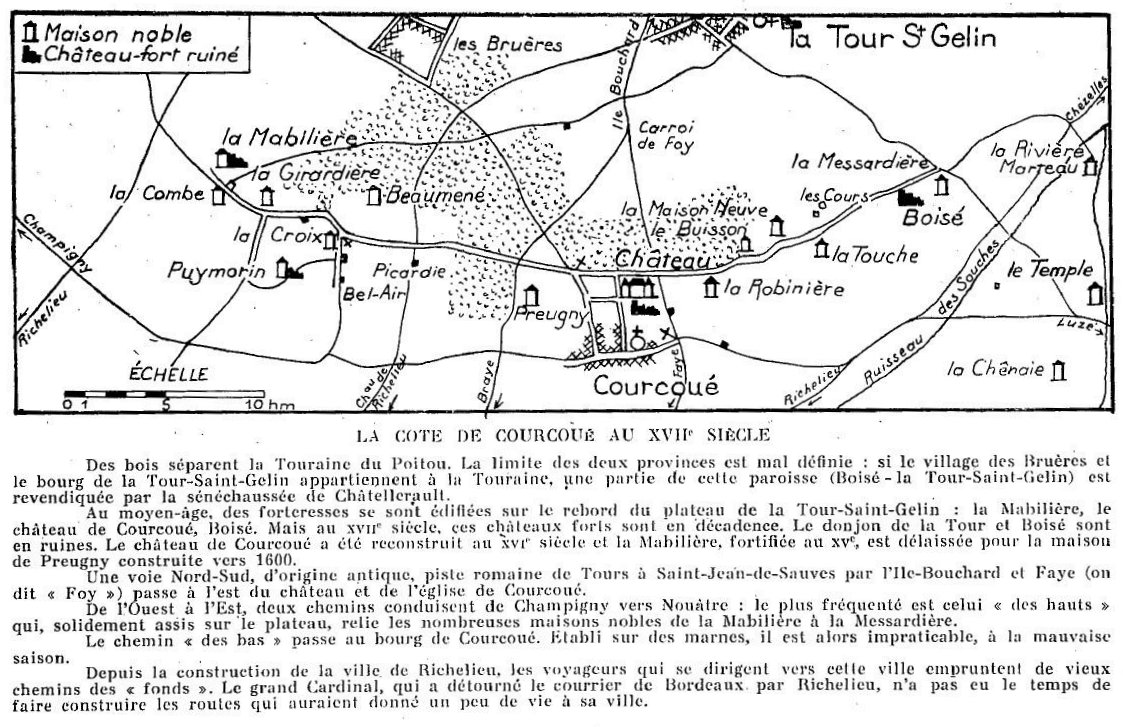
18th-century map of Courcoué

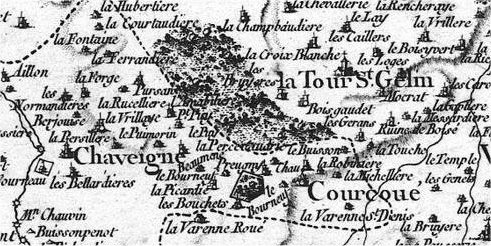
Cassini map, 17th century, showing L'Amabilière

La Mabilière appears as l’Amabilière on the 17th-century Cassini map, midway between the fortresses of Chaveignes and La Tour-Saint-Gelin, on the territory of the settlement of Courcoué. It can be seen in its modern context on Google Maps.

The fortresses were built to take advantage of the heights, from which the occupants could overlook the valley and control access from the north via the main road leading to Bléré/Sainte-Maure and via Champigny-sur-Veude and Rivière to Chinon. There were no fewer than nine other former aristocratic residences in the area: La Mabilière, La Girardière, La Croix-Morin, Le Puits-Morin, Beaumené, Preugny, the Château de Courcoué, La Robinière, the Château de Boisé, and La Messardière.
