= Louis, Prince of La Roche-sur-Yon =

French nobleman (1473–1520)

Louis de Bourbon
- Prince of La Roche-sur-Yon
- Coat-of-arms of Louis de Bourbon, Prince of La Roche-sur-Yon.

- Coat of arms
- Born: Autumn 1473
- Died: 10 November 1520
- Noble family: House of Bourbon
- Spouse: Louise de Bourbon, Duchess of Montpensier
- Issue: Suzanne de Bourbon; Louis de Bourbon, Duke of Montpensier; Charles, Prince of La Roche-sur-Yon
- Father: John II, Count of Vendôme
- Mother: Isabelle de Beauvau

Louis de Bourbon (1473 – 1520), Prince of La Roche-sur-Yon, was a French prince du sang. He was born in 1473 and was the son of John II, Count of Vendôme and Isabelle de Beauvau. He married his cousin, Louise de Bourbon, Duchess of Montpensier, eldest daughter of Gilbert of Bourbon, Count of Montpensier and Clara Gonzaga, on 21 March 1504, by whom he had three children. He died in 1520.

== Issue ==
- Suzanne de Bourbon (1508–1570), married Claude de Rieux, Count of Harcoute and Aumale, by whom she had issue.
- Louis de Bourbon, Duke of Montpensier (10 June 1513- 23 September 1582), married firstly in 1538, Jacqueline de Longwy, Countess of Bar-sur-Seine (died 28 August 1561). His second wife was Catherine de Lorraine.
- Charles de Bourbon, Prince of La Roche sur Yon (1515-1565), married Philippe de Montespédon, Dame de Beaupreau (died 1575), by whom he had two short-lived children: a son, Henri, and a daughter, Jeanne.

== Sources ==
- Du Tillet, Jean (1994). Brown, Elizabeth A. R. (ed.). Jean Du Tillet and the French wars of religion: five tracts, 1562-1569. Binghamton University Press.
- George, Hereford B. (1885). Genealogical Tables Illustrative of Modern History (2nd ed.). Oxford at the Clarendon Press.
- Ward, A.W.; Prothero, G.W.; Leathes, Stanley, eds. (1911). The Cambridge Modern History. Vol. XIII. Cambridge at the University Press.
