= François, Duke of Montpensier =

Late 16th-century French noble and governor

François
- Duke of Montpensier
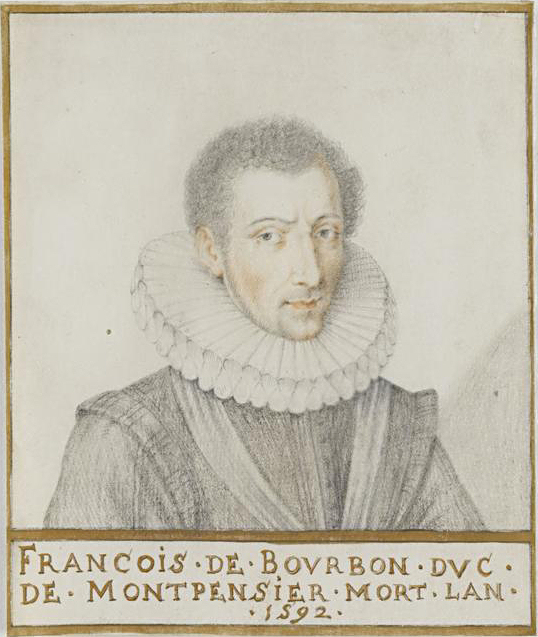
- Portrait c. 1628
- Born: c. 1542; Moulins
- Died: 4 June 1592
- Spouse: Renée d'Anjou-Mézières
- Issue: Henri, Duke of Montpensier
- Father: Louis, Duke of Montpensier
- Mother: Jacqueline de Longwy
- Religion: Catholic

François, duc de Montpensier and prince dauphin d'Auvergne (c. 1542 –4 June 1592) was a French noble, governor, diplomat and military commander during the French Wars of Religion.

The son of Louis, Duke of Montpensier and Jacqueline de Longwy, Montpensier got his start in politics as he was made the successor to his father's control of the governorship of Dauphiné, taking over the post in 1567. He participated alongside his father in the siege of La Rochelle during the fourth civil war and with the defection of the Catholic Damville to the rebel cause during the fifth civil war, Montpensier was established as a parallel governor to Damville's charge over the territory of Languedoc, though Damville would never be formally deposed. During this war he further held responsibility for one of the four royal armies, leading it into the Rhône valley. By 1582 Montpensier's father was nearing death, and he was chosen to replace his father as leader of a diplomatic mission to England to secure a marriage between King Henry III's brother and Elizabeth I; however this would not be a success. Failing in his efforts to marry Elizabeth, Alençon turned his attentions to Nederland, accepting an invitation to become their king. Montpensier would lead one of the armies that reinforced him in the kingdom, though the prince would sabotage his position in the territory the following year.

In the crisis that followed the death of Alençon, with succession defaulting to the king's Protestant cousin Henri de Navarre, Montpensier loyally defended the king against the Catholic ligue that opposed Navarre's succession, besting Entragues outside Orléans. Despite this, Henri was forced to capitulate to the ligue and open a war against Navarre and the Protestants of the kingdom. Montpensier participated in negotiations undertaken by Catherine de' Medici in 1586 with Navarre, that were ultimately unsuccessful in establishing an agreement between the prince and crown. In 1588, Montpensier resigned his responsibilities as governor of Dauphiné to his son the prince of Dombes. In May of that year, Henri attempted a confrontation in Paris with the ligue; this backfired, and he was forced to flee with his loyal advisers, among them Montpensier. Establishing himself at Chartres he made numerous concessions to the ligue, among them dispossessing his favourite Épernon from his governate of Normandie, replacing him with Montpensier. In December Henri made another attempt on the ligue, assassinating the duke of Guise on 23 December. In response to this much of France entered rebellion against the crown. Montpensier fought for Henri in Normandie against an allied army of ligueurs and peasant rebels known as Gautiers, besting the latter in April 1589. After the death of Henri III in August 1589, Montpensier followed his chosen heir the Protestant Navarre, something many other Catholic notables could not countenance. In early 1590 he fought with Navarre, now styled Henri IV at the decisive victory of the Battle of Ivry. On 4 June 1592 he died and was succeeded as duke of Montpensier by his only son.

== Early life and family ==
François was born in 1542, the only son of Louis de Bourbon, duke of Montpensier and Jacqueline de Longwy. Jacqueline was the illegitimate niece of King François I and brought with her to the marriage the counties of Beaujeu, Forez and Dombes. Louis for his part was governor first of the interior provinces, then Dauphiné and finally Normandie. François had three elder sisters, Françoise, Anne and Jeanne and two younger sisters Charlotte and Louise.

Montpensier was known in the lifetime of his father as the 'prince dauphin d'Auvergne', a title that had been accrued by the family during the fourteenth century.

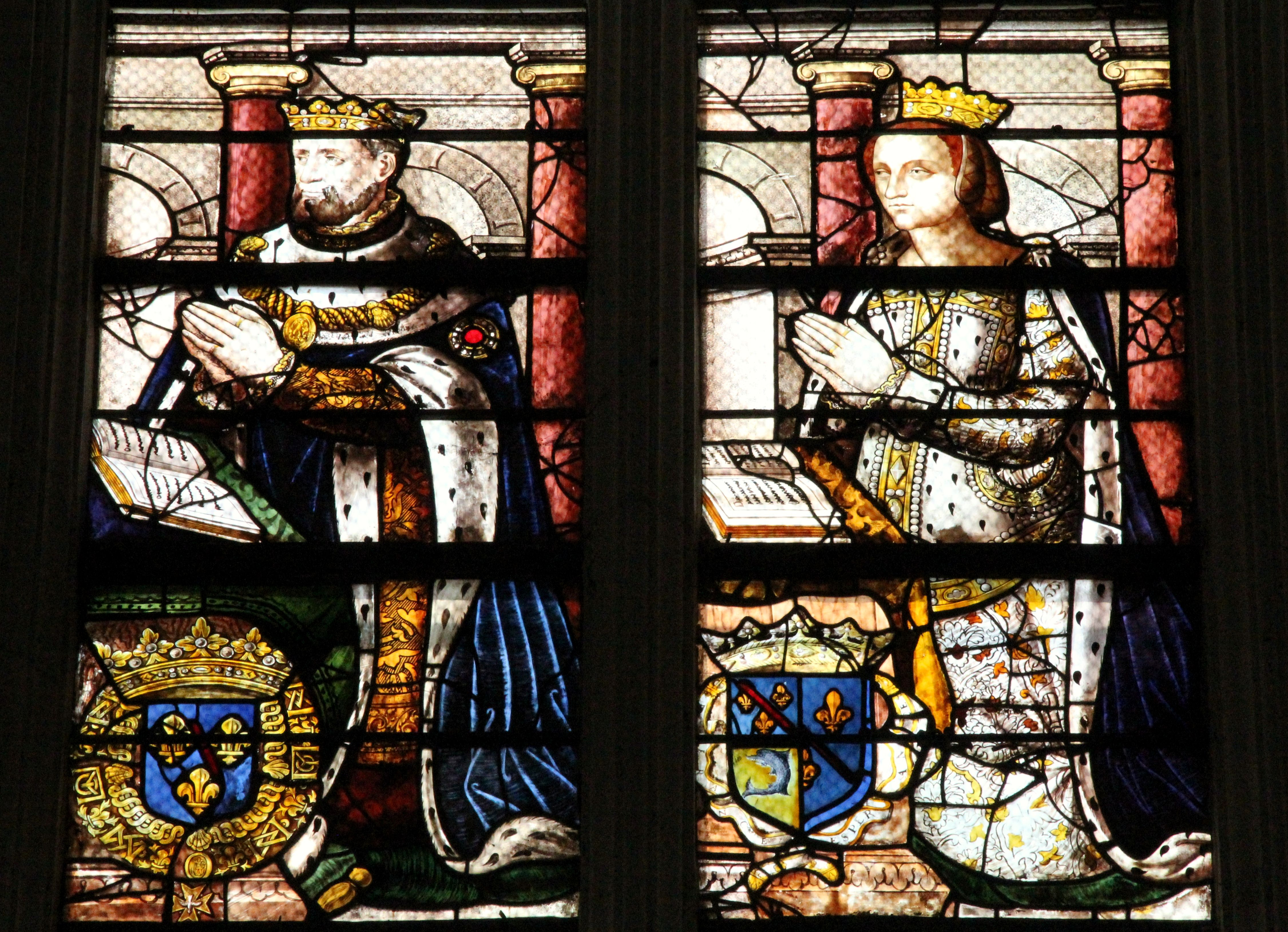
Stained glass window rendition of Montpensier and Renée d'Anjou-Mézières

In 1566 he was married to the wealthy heiress Renée d'Anjou-Mézières. The Lorraine family had hoped to secure her hand for marriage to the duke of Mayenne. She predeceased her husband, dying in 1577.

Together they would have issue:

- Henri, Duke of Montpensier (1573-1608), the final duke of Montpensier

He had a reputation as a valiant prince, however he was also regarded as not particularly intelligent, which occasioned cutting remarks at his expense from the king.

== Reign of Charles IX ==
=== Governor of Dauphiné ===
Louis, Duke of Montpensier had been in possession of a large super-governate of interior provinces, including Anjou, Touraine, and Maine. In 1565 he wished to resign this, and was granted the permission to exercise survivance so that the governorship of this agglomerated region could go to his son Montpensier, this request was granted by the crown. At the advent of 1567, Louis the duke of Montpensier surrendered a further charge he possessed as governor of Dauphiné to his son, with Montpensier assuming the charge on 28 February of that year.

As part of the expansion in distribution of the honour of becoming a chevalier de l'Ordre de Saint-Michel, many senior grandees were devolved the privilege to make their own chevaliers de l'Ordre. Among those granted this, were Montpensier and his father the duke who between them would be allowed to confer 19 recipients of the order.

=== Massacre of Saint Bartholomew ===
During the festivities to celebrate the grand wedding between the Protestant young king of Navarre and the sister of the king, Marguerite grand balls and masquerades were held. As part of the masquerade, a procession of gold and silver chariots took place with many of the greatest nobles of the kingdom in them. In the greatest, next to the god Neptune was the king, while in other chariots were the duke of Guise, Navarre, the prince of Condé and Montpensier.

After the Massacre of Saint Bartholomew which accompanied the wedding, the Protestant city of La Rochelle entered rebellion against the crown. A large army featuring many of the greatest grandees of the kingdom, Protestant and Catholic was dispatched to reduce the city into obedience. Among the nobles in the royal camp were the king's brother Anjou who was in overall command of the siege, Navarre, the prince of Condé, the duke of Guise, the duke of Montpensier Louis and his son François.

== Reign of Henri III ==
With Anjou returning to France as king Henri III, the conseil d'État was re-constituted to advise him. Composed of many of the most senior grandees and prelates of the kingdom both Montpensier and his father were members of the advisory council.

=== Fifth war of religion ===
In 1574, Damville, governor of Languedoc entered rebellion in favour of the Malcontent opposition. The crown angrily denounced his betrayal, informing his subordinates that Damville was a rebel and should no longer command their obedience. Despite this they would not formally dispossess Damville of his office of governor. Instead of doing so, Montpensier was appointed as a shadow governor over the same remit, granted the authority of lieutenant-general of Languedoc, Dauphiné and Provence.

Damville responded to the attack on his authority by entering formal alliance with the Protestants of southern France. Montpensier was granted command of one of the four royal armies dispatched by Henri to campaign that year, leading his forces into the Rhône valley. The civil war would continue into 1576 when it would be brought to a close with the generous Peace of Monsieur which granted large concessions to the rebels and Protestants.

=== Alençon ===
Proposals for a marriage between the king's brother Alençon to the queen of England had long been mooted at the French court as a mechanism by which to remove a politically destabilising element from France. Negotiations got seriously underway in April 1581 with the arrival in England of a diplomatic mission to work out the details with Elizabeth. Montpensier led the group of thirteen ambassadors on the mission. It had initially been intended that his father would lead the expedition, however he was ill to the point of being unable to travel. They were received by Elizabeth at Westminster Palace where the queen descended from her dais to greet him with a kiss. Elizabeth was playing for time, and spoke to each ambassador in turn, threatening Montpensier that if he did not put on a cap she would have one attached to his head. After several months of negotiations, with little progress, the ambassadors returned to France in failure.

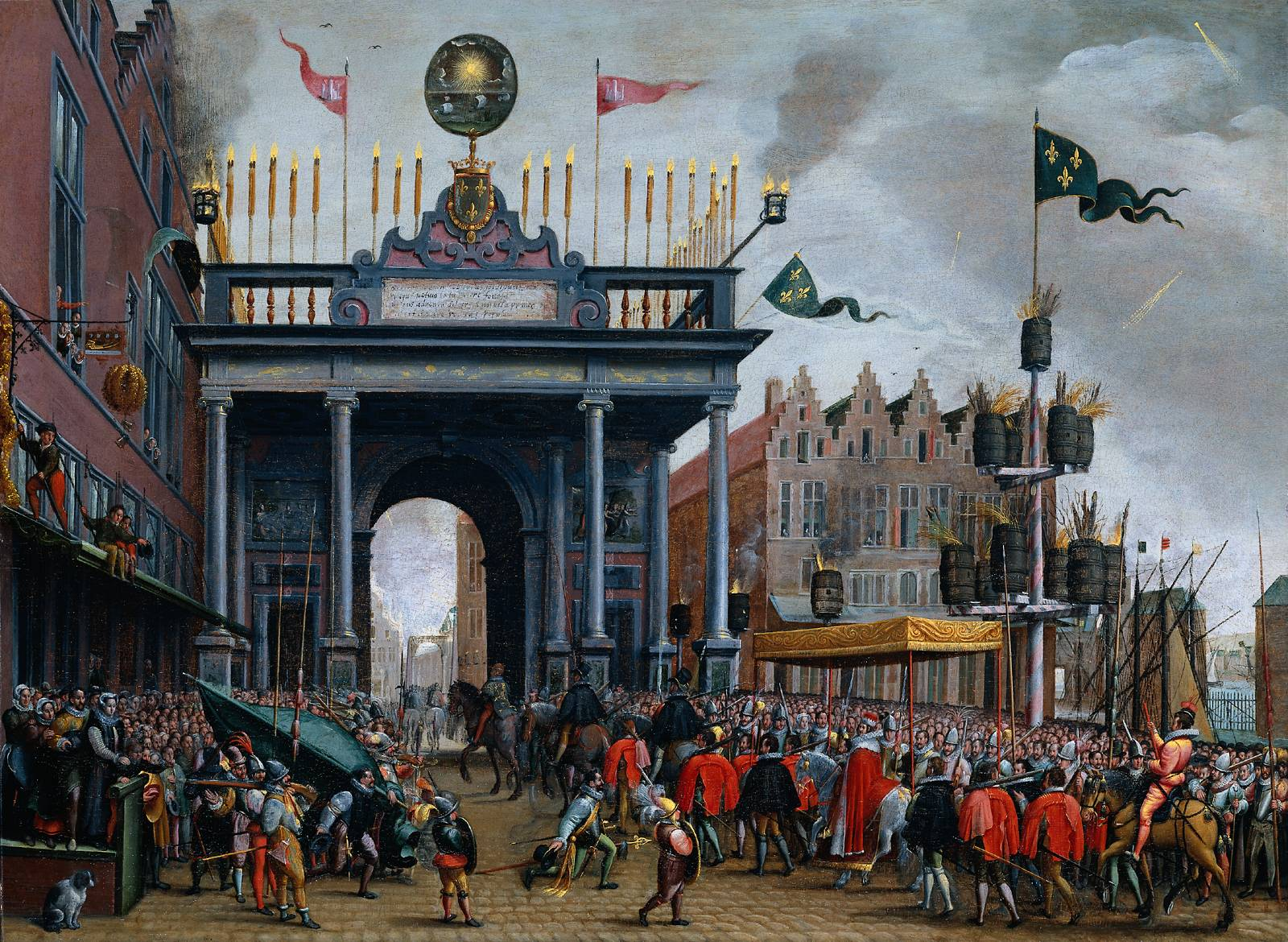
Joyous Entry of Alençon into Antwerp (Rijksmuseum)

With this policy a failure, Alençon continued to pursue his Dutch ambitions, establishing himself as king of Nederland in the coming year. At Alençon's 'joyous entry' into the city of Antwerp in February 1582, Montpensier and the earl of Leicester were in the procession alongside him, representing the support for his control of Nederland by England and France respectively. Catherine decided to provide support to her son's shaky position in the nascent kingdom, dispatching a force of Swiss, German, and French infantry to bolster him. This force was sent out in September under the joint command of Montpensier and Marshal Biron. To support this force, the queen mother provided 3,000 écus in advance of a larger sum of 50,000 écus which would cover all the necessary costs. Their forces linked up with Alençon's army on 1 December 1582, however their arrival could not ameliorate Alençon's shortage of food. Alençon took his army into Antwerp, a city formally under his authority, and made a failed attempt to surprise it in a coup that would become known as the French Fury. Antwerp was however forewarned, and his troops were massacred. Both Biron and Montpensier were uninvolved in Alençon's abortive coup plot.

=== Lieutenant-general ===
As governor of Dauphiné, Montpensier had a tense relationship with his theoretical subordinate Maugiron, the lieutenant-general of the province. Montpensier let it be known that it was his intention to visit his governate in February 1584, so that he might replace local governors. This was to be done without consultation with Maugiron, who fumed to the king the following month that while he was of course a servant of Montpensier he could only truly follow orders sent to him by Henri.

=== War with the Catholic ligue ===
In July 1584, Alençon died and with his death the succession to the crown defaulted to Henri's distant cousin the Protestant Navarre. To much of the Catholic nobility Navarre's succession was unacceptable, and the Lorraine family used opposition to this as a nucleus for a new Catholic ligue. In early 1585 the Lorraine family and their allies declared war on the crown, seizing strategic cities across their areas of influence and forming an army. Montpensier, loyal to the king, worked to stop these efforts. He confronted Entragues the governor of Orléans who had joined the movement, successfully driving him back in an engagement outside Orléans in April.

Despite this success Entragues was able to hold off Montpensier from capturing Orléans, rebuffing him from an attempt to take the citadel. Soon thereafter Henri established Montpensier as his lieutenant in Poitou in the hopes he could lead the opposition to the ligueur the duke of Mercœur. Despite some royalist successes, the king felt obliged by July to capitulate to the ligue in the Treaty of Nemours.

Montpensier was among the notables who constituted the conseil des finances in 1585. The body was largely composed of secretaries of state such as Bellièvre, Brûlart and Villeroy but also featured nobles of the sword as embodied by Montpensier. During that year, the former royal favourite Saint-Luc who had been disgraced in 1580 reached out to Montpensier in the hopes that putting his ordinance company at Montpensier's service could be a mechanism for his rehabilitation in the eyes of the king. The king for his part, shaken by the war with the ligue was keen to facilitate at least some level of reconciliation.

=== War with the Protestants ===
Henri's participation in the war against his Protestant cousin Navarre was a reluctant one, and he dispatched his mother to conduct negotiations with the prince in late 1586. Montpensier and the duke of Nevers assisted her in these negotiations and met with Navarre at Saint-Brice. Navarre for his part brought his cousin Condé and ally the duke of Bouillon. In the following interviews with Navarre, Catherine exhausted herself trying to find some route to an accord. The royal party made concessions to Navarre to a certain degree, however they departed without the full agreement that had been hoped for. Navarre promised a further interview in February 1587, but backed out of attending.

At this time, the duke of Guise was greatly concerned by the closeness of Montpensier and Damville. Unlike the ligueur candidate of heir to the throne, Cardinal Bourbon, Montpensier was young and healthy and therefore had a realistic prospect of outliving the king. The Savoyard ambassador meanwhile mused that perhaps the alliance was a prelude to Montpensier declaring his candidacy for the throne as a Catholic alternative to Navarre. In one theory it was to be Épernon who prepared the way for Montpensier to the throne through his acquisition of the Bastille. Ultimately however these theories foundered as Henri was unwilling to break from the fundamental laws of succession, and Montpensier was loyal enough to the king that he would not challenge him through the formation of a counter-ligue.

In the campaign season of 1587, Navarre was joined by his Catholic cousin the count of Soissons in his campaigns against the king. It was rumoured that Montpensier had secretly sent forces to join those under Soissons in the interest of strengthening the Bourbon family against their Guisard enemies.

During 1588, Montpensier surrendered the charge of governor of Dauphiné to his son, much as his father had done in 1567. Soon thereafter relinquishing this governate he would be granted that of Normandie.

Humiliated in his showdown with the ligue in Paris during the Day of the Barricades, Henri feared that he would soon be seized by the ligue forces in the capital. With the negotiations of his mother a failure, he resolved to flee. To this end he gathered his loyal supporters, among them the duke of Montpensier, Marshal d'Aumont, Marshal Biron and the Cardinal de Lenoncourt. The group made first for Saint-Cloud, then the Château of Rambouillet before establishing himself in exile at Chartres.

=== Governor of Normandie ===
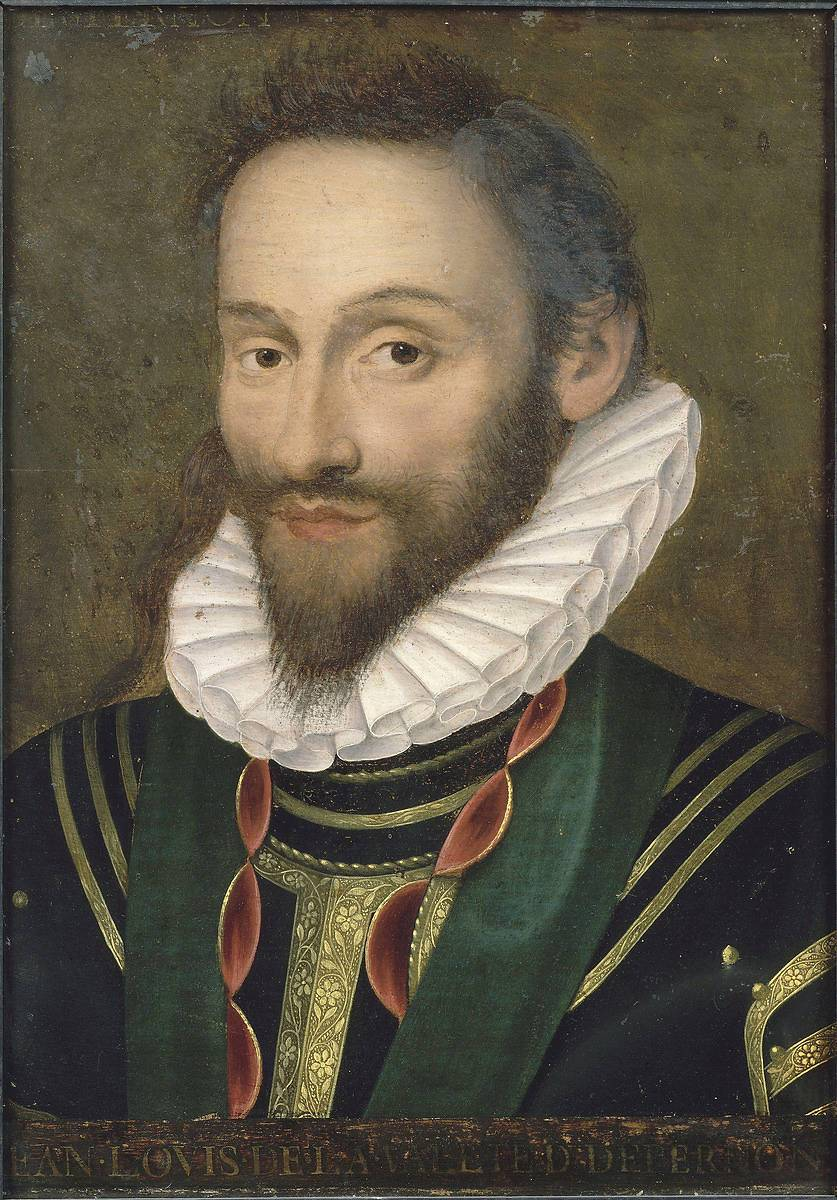
Portrait of Épernon, paramount favourite to Henri III

His establishment in Normandie was designed to appease the Norman nobility, which had despised the previous governor, the royal favourite Épernon. Épernon in his negotiations with Henri for the deprival of many of his offices as demanded by the ligue had proposed Montpensier to fill his position in Normandie. The appointment of Montpensier in combination with abolition of several taxes bought the king favour and he was invited to Rouen in June 1588.

Having resigned his charge as governor, Épernon retired from court with a large retinue to his government of Loches. This had the advantage of keeping him in close contact with Montpensier and the Bourbon family at the Château de Champigny, with whom he met in late June.

The Estates General called as a capitulation to the ligue after the Day of the Barricades, proved to be an intractable contest between the king and the Third Estate. While Navarre as a Protestant could not attend, Montpensier, Soissons and Conti made attempts to defend his prerogatives in the face of a hostile set of Estates. Montpensier having spent some time at the Estates, despaired for their progress, and decided on 22 December to retire to his Château de Champigny for a holiday.

=== Gautiers ===
On the very next day, 23 December 1588, Henri entered open war with the ligue for the second time by his decision to assassinate the leader of the ligue, the duke of Guise. Upon receipt of news of the kings actions, many cities in Normandie defected to the ligue, among them Falaise. Montpensier put Falaise under siege on 18 April of 1589. The main ligueur commander in the theatre was the count of Brissac, who allied himself with the peasant Gautier movement to build his numbers. The Gautiers had been in active rebellion in Normandie since 1587. Brissac advanced with the peasant army, but his forces were divided, and Montpensier broke off forces from the siege, crushing the peasant army on 22 April, killing 3000. Montpensier pursued the fragmented peasant forces but was unable to reduce their stronghold of the Pays d'Ouche. Brissac had succeeded in his objective of breaking the siege of Falaise, and he abandoned his peasant allies to Montpensier's attentions, entering Falaise shortly thereafter.

For his part Montpensier eventually achieved total victory over the peasant rebels, but through the intercession of priests from their army, was persuaded to give mercy in return for the remainder of the rebels returning to their homes. In the prior months he had attempted to contain their movement with a promise to reduce the taille however this aroused little enthusiasm.

With the gautier movement suppressed, Montpensier found himself comfortably able to contain the ligueur presence in Normandie.

== Reign of Henri IV ==
=== Loyalist ===
After the assassination of Henri III, the prospect of serving a Protestant monarch was no longer a prospective hypothetical, but rather a present reality. For many Catholic notables who had remained loyal to Henri, serving Navarre, or Henri IV as he now styled himself, was a bridge to far and they retreated into neutrality. Among the nobles that took this course were Nevers and Épernon. Montpensier though was among the Catholic notables who gave their support to Henri and continued the fight against the ligue, alongside the duke of Longueville, the prince of Conti and Marshals Biron and Aumont. This was embodied in their signing of the declaration of 4 August in which Henri promised to protect Catholicism.

At the time of the king's death, he and Navarre had been about to conduct a siege of ligueur held Paris. However the army was thrown into chaos by the death of Henri, and Henri IV was obliged to break off the siege and retreat into Normandie. On route he met with Conti and Montpensier at Clermont where he was able to consult them as to how he should proceed. Arriving in Normandie, he unified his remaining forces with those under the command of Montpensier and moved to Dieppe, which opened its gates to the Protestant king. At the same time, Henri was conducting a diplomatic offensive to the princes of Italia. The Catholic notables who supported him, among them Montpensier, d'Aumont, Biron, the lieutenant-general of Champagne Dinteville and the duke of Piney-Luxembourg were all signatories to an explanatory letter to the granduca di Toscana on 18 August. In the letter they elaborated the reasoning that Catholic nobles should support the Protestant king.

=== Battle of Ivry ===
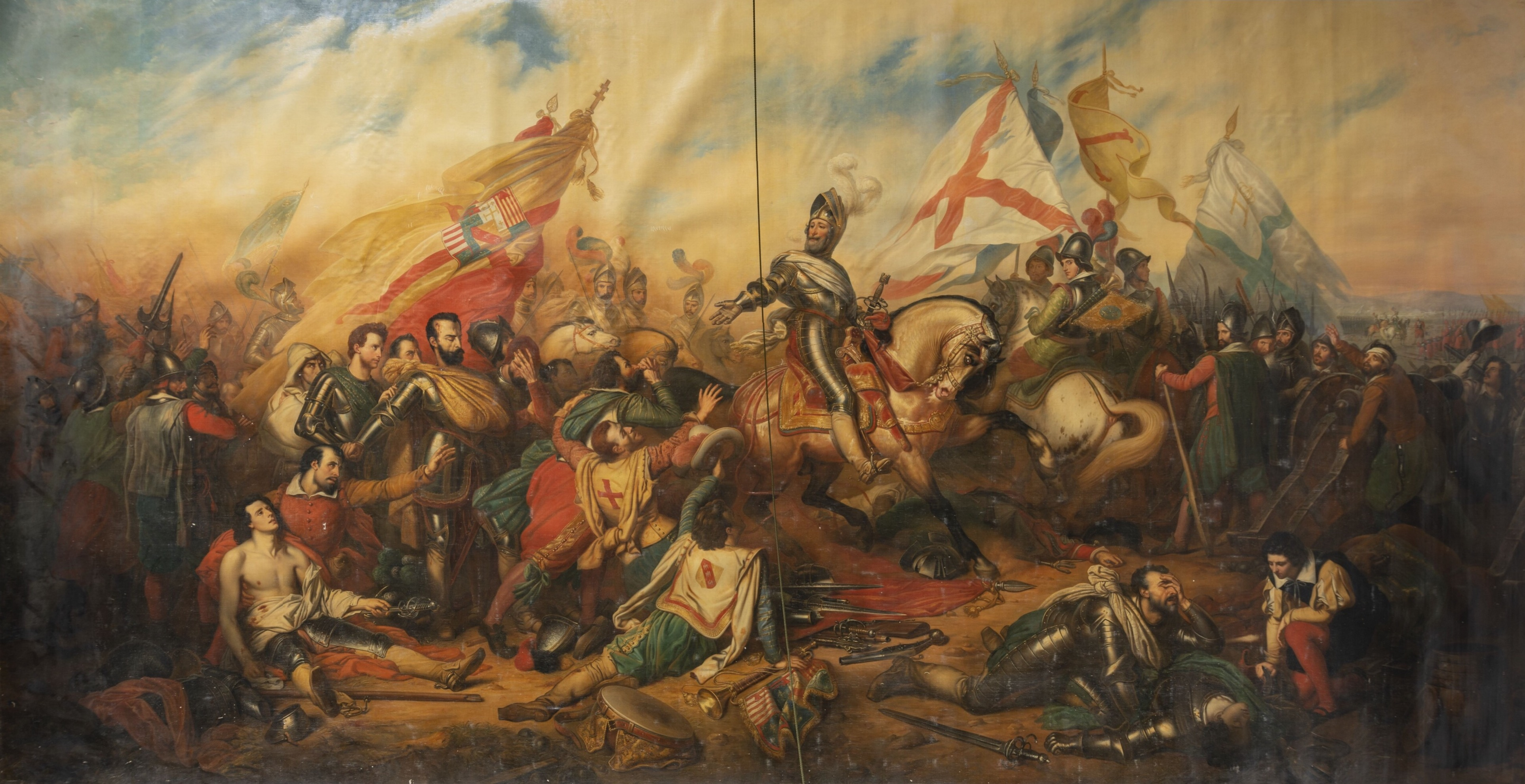
Rendition of Henri IV's triumph at the Battle of Ivry

Henri entrusted Montpensier with part of the army to drive along the Seine and push the ligue from the region in the opening months of 1590, though successful he did not push out from the region in case of a counter offensive. In March 1590 the lieutenant-general of the ligue brought out his army hoping for a decisive confrontation with Henri. The two sides met at Ivry on 14 March. Montpensier having rejoined the main royal army held joint command of the kings left with Marshal d'Aumont, each possessing large cavalry formations. He faced off against the duke of Nemours who commanded the ligueur cavalry. Nemours advance proved hard to resist and Montpensier's forces were pushed back, however in the centre the king achieved a decisive advantage and Mayenne was routed.

=== Death ===
With Mayenne out of Normandie, Montpensier campaigned against the local presence of the ligue. He caused much grief for the ligueur merchants of Rouen with his capture of Bernay and Beaumont-le-Roger. Both towns held a great quantity of the merchants cloth.

On his death on 4 June 1592, his son, the 'prince de Dombes', succeeded him as duke of Montpensier.

== Sources ==
- Babelon, Jean-Pierre (2009). Henri IV. Fayard.
- Benedict, Philip (2003). Rouen during the Wars of Religion. Cambridge University Press.
- Carroll, Stuart (2005). Noble Power during the French Wars of Religion: The Guise Affinity and the Catholic Cause in Normandy. Cambridge University Press.
- Carroll, Stuart (2011). Martyrs and Murderers: The Guise Family and the Making of Europe. Oxford University Press.
- Chevallier, Pierre (1985). Henri III: Roi Shakespearien. Fayard.
- Cloulas, Ivan (1979). Catherine de Médicis. Fayard.
- Constant, Jean-Marie (1984). Les Guise. Hachette.
- Constant, Jean-Marie (1996). La Ligue. Fayard.
- George, Hereford B. (1885). Genealogical Tables Illustrative of Modern History (2nd ed.). Oxford at the Clarendon Press.
- Harding, Robert (1978). Anatomy of a Power Elite: the Provincial Governors in Early Modern France. Yale University Press.
- Holt, Mack (2002). The Duke of Anjou and the Politique Struggle During the Wars of Religion. Cambridge University Press.
- Holt, Mack P. (2005). The French Wars of Religion, 1562-1629. Cambridge University Press.
- Jouanna, Arlette (1998). Histoire et Dictionnaire des Guerres de Religion. Bouquins.
- Jouanna, Arlette (2015). The St Bartholomew's Day Massacre: The Mysteries of a Crime of State. Manchester University Press.
- Knecht, Robert (2010). The French Wars of Religion, 1559-1598. Routledge.
- Knecht, Robert (2014). Catherine de' Medici. Routledge.
- Knecht, Robert (2016). Hero or Tyrant? Henry III, King of France, 1574-1589. Routledge.
- Pitts, Vincent (2012). Henri IV of France: His Reign and Age. Johns Hopkins University Press.
- Le Roux, Nicolas (2000). La Faveur du Roi: Mignons et Courtisans au Temps des Derniers Valois. Champ Vallon.
- Le Roux, Nicolas (2006). Un Régicide au nom de Dieu: L'Assassinat d'Henri III. Gallimard.
- Salmon, J.H.M (1979). Society in Crisis: France during the Sixteenth Century. Metheun & Co.
- Sutherland, Nicola (1962). The French Secretaries of State in the Age of Catherine de Medici. The Athlone Press.
