= Courcoué =

- Commune
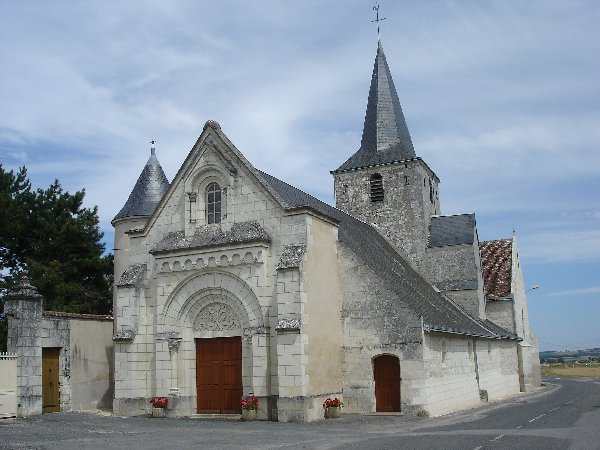
- The church in Courcoué

- Coat of arms
- Location of Courcoué
- Location within France Location within Centre-Val de Loire
- Coordinates: 47°02′05″N 0°23′48″E
- Country: France
- Region: Centre-Val de Loire
- Department: Indre-et-Loire
- Arrondissement: Chinon
- Canton: Sainte-Maure-de-Touraine

Government
  - Mayor (2020–2026): Nicolas Sallé
- Area^{1}: 15.66 km^{2} (6.05 sq mi)
- Highest elevation: 122 m (400 ft)
- Lowest elevation: 59 m (194 ft)
- Population (2023): 235
  - Density: 15.0/km^{2} (38.9/sq mi)
- Time zone: UTC+01:00 (CET)
  - Summer (DST): UTC+02:00 (CEST)
- INSEE/Postal code: 37087 /37120
- ^{1} French Land Register data, which excludes lakes, ponds, glaciers > 1 km^{2} (0.386 sq mi or 247 acres) and river estuaries.

Courcoué (French pronunciation: [kuʁkwe]) is a commune in the Indre-et-Loire department in central France.

== Landmarks ==
- La Mabilière

== Population ==
Historical population
Year	Pop.	±% p.a.
1968	364	—
1975	280	−3.68%
1982	284	+0.20%
1990	259	−1.15%
1999	239	−0.89%
2007	250	+0.56%
2012	263	+1.02%
2017	255	−0.62%
2023	235	−1.35%
Source: INSEE

== See also ==
- Communes of the Indre-et-Loire department
