= Francis II of France =

King of France from 1559 to 1560

Francis II
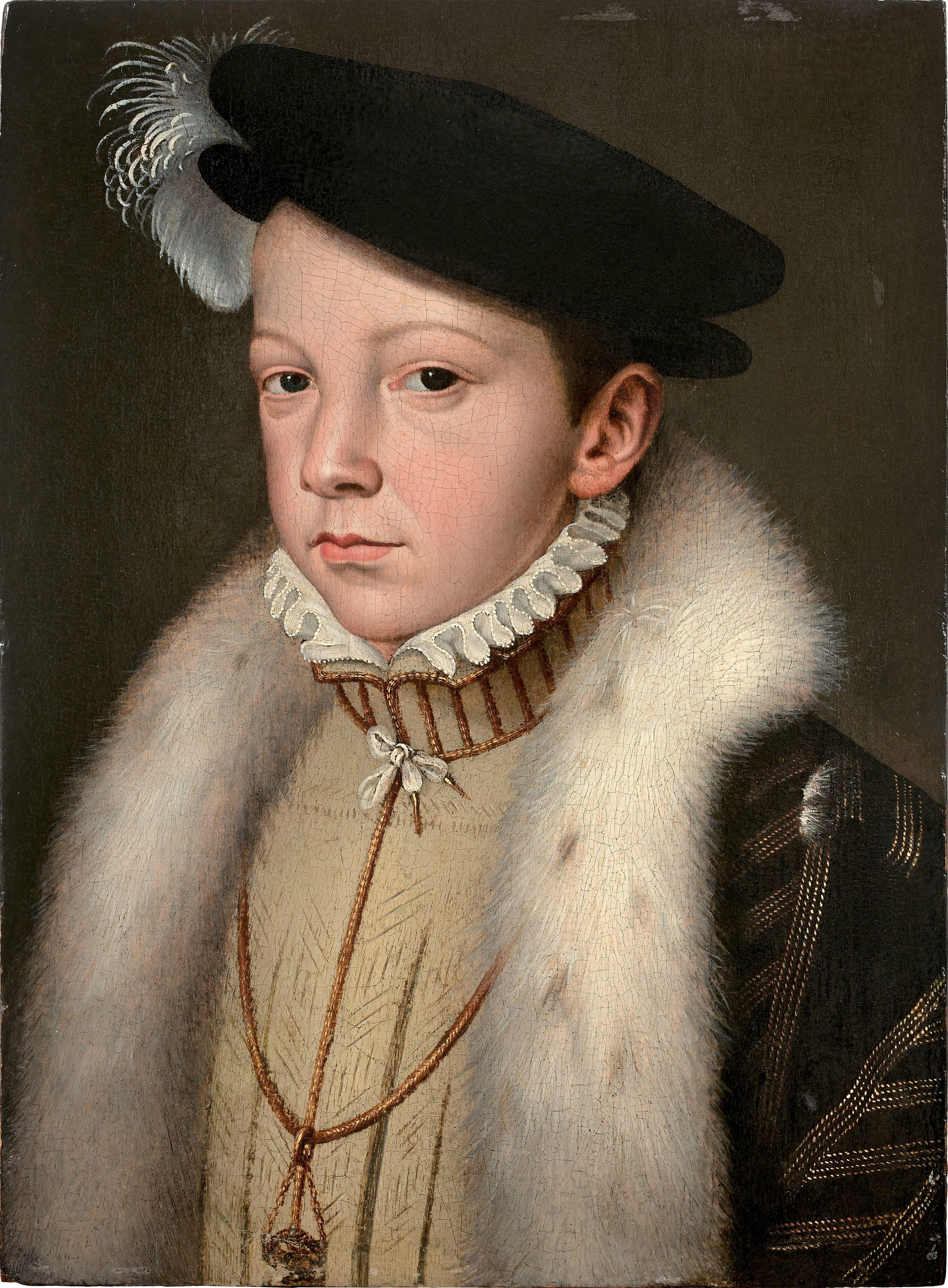
- Portrait attributed to François Clouet, c. 1558

King of France
- Reign: 10 July 1559 – 5 December 1560
- Coronation: 21 September 1559
- Predecessor: Henry II
- Successor: Charles IX

King consort of Scotland
- Tenure: 24 April 1558 – 5 December 1560
- Born: 19 January 1544; Château de Fontainebleau, France
- Died: 5 December 1560 (aged 16); Hôtel Groslot, Orléans, France
- Burial: 23 December 1560; Basilica of St Denis, France
- Spouse: Mary, Queen of Scots (m. 1558)
- House: Valois-Angoulême
- Father: Henry II of France
- Mother: Catherine de' Medici

Francis II (French: François II; 19 January 1544 – 5 December 1560) was King of France from 1559 to 1560. He was also King of Scotland as the husband of Mary, Queen of Scots, from 1558 until his death in 1560.

He ascended the throne of France at age 15 after the accidental death of his father, Henry II, in 1559. His short reign was dominated by the first stirrings of the French Wars of Religion.

Although the royal age of majority was 14, his mother, Catherine de' Medici, entrusted the reins of government to his wife Mary's uncles from the House of Guise, staunch supporters of the Catholic cause. They were unable to help Catholics in Scotland against the progressing Scottish Reformation, however, and the Auld Alliance was dissolved.

After dying of an ear infection, Francis was succeeded by two of his brothers in turn, both of whom were also unable to reduce tensions between Protestants and Catholics.

== Childhood and education (1544–1559) ==
Francis was born 11 years after his parents' wedding. The long delay in producing an heir may have been due to his father's repudiation of his mother in favour of his mistress Diane de Poitiers, but this repudiation was mitigated by Diane's insistence that Henry spend his nights with Catherine. Francis was at first raised at the Château de Saint-Germain-en-Laye. He was baptised on 10 February 1544 at the Chapelle des Trinitaires in Fontainebleau. His godparents were Francis I (who knighted him during the ceremony), Pope Paul III, and his great-aunt Marguerite de Navarre. He became governor of Languedoc in 1546 and Dauphin of France in 1547, when his grandfather Francis I died.

Francis's governor and governess were Jean d'Humières and Françoise d'Humières, and his tutor was Pierre Danès, a Greek scholar originally from Naples. He learned dancing from Virgilio Bracesco and fencing from Hector of Mantua.

King Henry II, his father, arranged a remarkable betrothal for his son to the five year old Mary, Queen of Scots, in the Châtillon agreement of 27 January 1548, when Francis was only four years old. Mary had been crowned Queen of Scotland in Stirling Castle on 9 September 1543 at the age of nine months, following the death of her father James V. Mary was a granddaughter of Claude, Duke of Guise, a very influential figure at the court of France. Once the marriage agreement was formally ratified, the five-year-old Mary was sent to France to be raised at court until the marriage. She was tall for her age and eloquent, and Francis was unusually short and stuttered. Henry II said, "from the very first day they met, my son and she got on as well together as if they had known each other for a long time".

On 24 April 1558, Francis and Mary married in Notre Dame Cathedral in Paris. It was a union that could have given the future kings of France the throne of Scotland and also a claim to the throne of England through Mary's great-grandfather, King Henry VII of England. As a result of the marriage, Francis became king of Scotland. The marriage produced no children, and may never even have been consummated, possibly due to Francis's illnesses or undescended testicles.

== Becoming king ==
A little over a year after his marriage, on 10 July 1559, Francis became king at age 15 upon the death of Henry II, who had been killed as a result of injuries sustained during a jousting accident ten days prior. On 21 September 1559, Francis II was crowned king in Reims by his wife's uncle Charles, Cardinal of Lorraine. The crown was so heavy that nobles had to hold it in place for him. The court then moved to the Loire Valley, where the Château de Blois and the surrounding forests were the new king's home. Francis II took the sun for his emblem and for his mottoes Spectanda fides (This is how faith should be respected) and Lumen rectis (Light for the righteous).

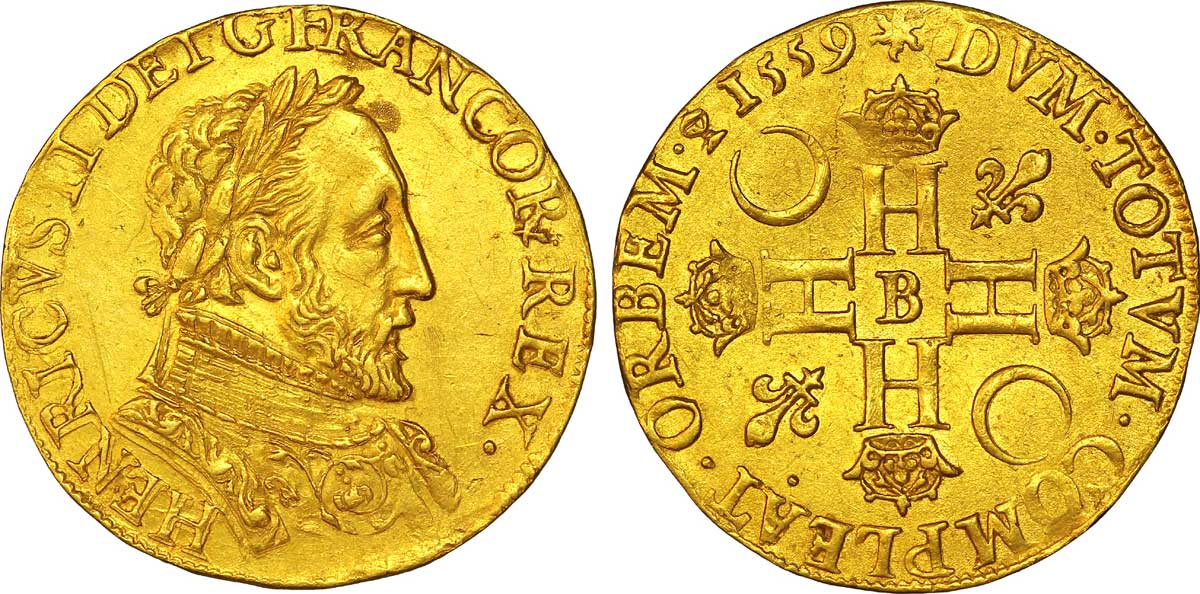
Coinage under Francis II, with the bust of his father Henri II

According to French law, Francis was an adult who did not need a regent; but since he was young, inexperienced, and in fragile health, he delegated his power to his wife's uncles from the noble House of Guise: Francis, Duke of Guise, and Charles, Cardinal of Lorraine. His mother, Catherine de' Medici, agreed to this delegation. On the first day of his reign, Francis II instructed his four ministers to take orders from his mother, but since she was still in mourning for her husband, she directed them to the House of Guise.

The two eldest brothers of the House of Guise had already had major roles in the reign of Henry II. Francis, Duke of Guise, was one of the most famous military commanders in the royal army, and the Cardinal of Lorraine had participated in the most important negotiations and matters of the kingdom. After Francis II ascended the throne, the two brothers split the custody of the kingdom: Duke Francis became head of the army and Charles the head of finance, justice, and diplomacy.

The rise of the House of Guise worked to the detriment of its old rival, Anne de Montmorency, Constable of France. At the new king's suggestion, he left the court for his estates to get some rest. Diane de Poitiers, the mistress of the previous king, was asked not to appear at court. Her protégé Jean Bertrand had to surrender his title Keeper of the Seals of France to chancellor François Olivier, whom Diane had removed from this position a few years earlier. It was a palace revolution.

The transition has been described as brutal, but while it no doubt caused the Constable considerable frustration, there were no confrontations or reprisals. Montmorency remained tied to power. As soon as the day after the death of the king, he was present at the council meeting and was also at the coronation. Later he supported the repression of the Amboise conspiracy of 1560, notably by going to the Parlement to communicate to its members the measures taken by the king. In July 1560 he came back to court and to the council, although in a much less flamboyant manner than before. The Guises were now the new masters of the court. The king granted them numerous favours and privileges, one of the most significant being the title of Grand Master of France, a title until then held by the son of the Constable, François de Montmorency.

== Reign (1559–1560) ==
=== Domestic policy ===
==== Kingdom on the death of Henri II ====
With the peace of Cateau Cambresis in 1559, the crown had been left on the cusp of bankruptcy. The public deficit stood at 40 million livres, of which 19 million was owed immediately. The interest rates on these loans were notable, as lenders had grown wary of the crown's inability to pay over the years and this lack of confidence would only be furthered with Henry II's death. Henri's religious policy had also proved ineffective, his persecutory edicts failing to stop the growth of Calvinism in France. Religious violence was increasing, with attacks in Paris, first in response to the loss at the Battle of Saint-Quentin (1557) and then around the trial of the heretic parlementaire Anne du Bourg.

==== Guise administration ====
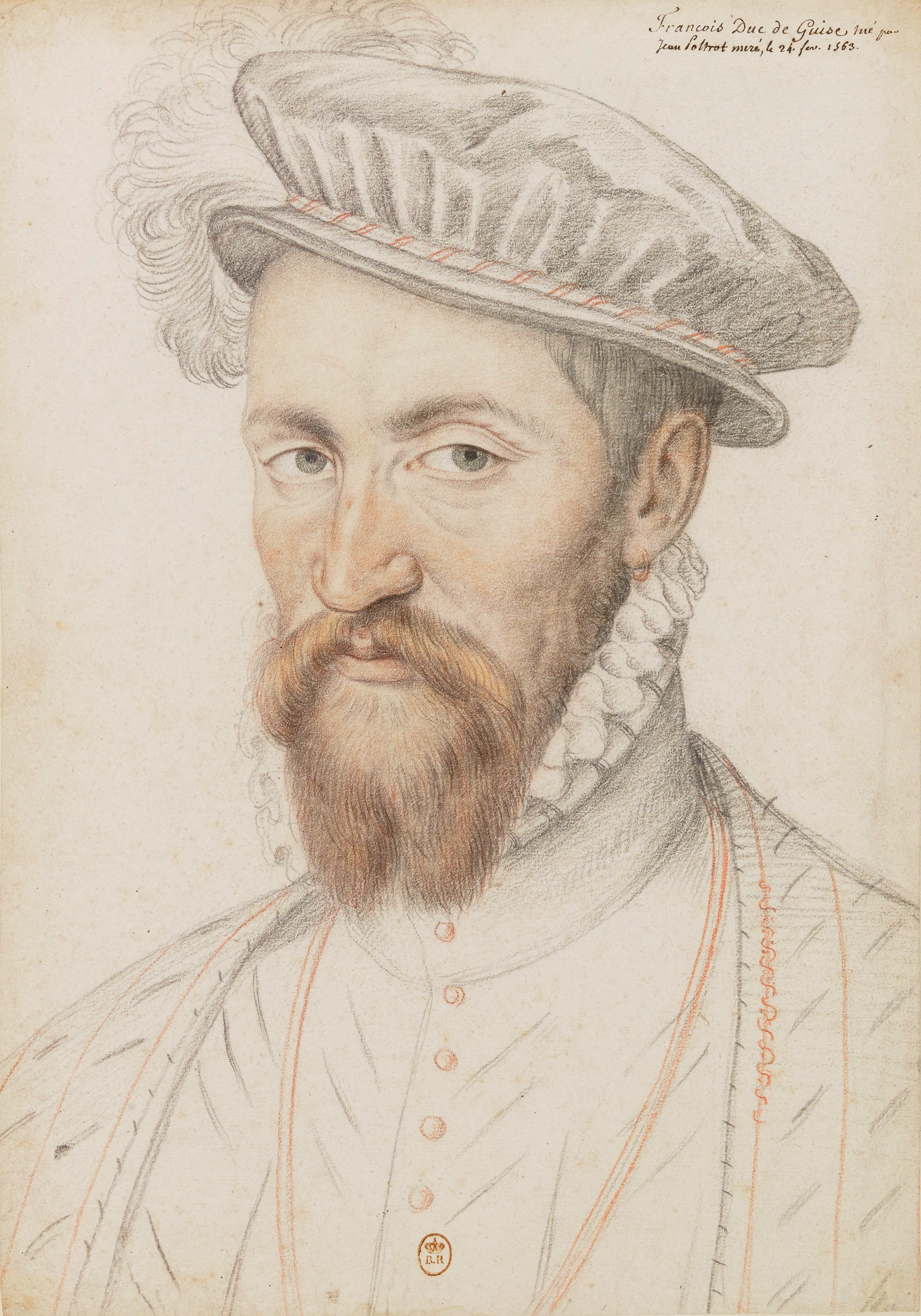
Francis of Lorraine, Duke of Guise. Pencil portrait by François Clouet.

From the beginning of their assumption of government, the Guises faced opposition from several factions. Their rise to dominance had come at the expense of Anne de Montmorency and the House of Bourbon who resented their total ascendency to varying degrees.

The political decisions of the government were also contested. To try and set about fixing the realm's finances, they embarked upon an aggressive campaign of cost cutting, scaling down the size of the army from its height in the wars, and deferring payments to the troops, who angrily protested against the Guises. This would not however be enough, so they were moved to raise forced loans from the provinces, such as 800,000 livres from Normandy, to cover shortfalls. They further suppressed Venal office.

Forced loans would continue into 1560, with 100,000 crowns being demanded of the Parlement and merchants of Paris in October 1560, shortly after the convoking of the estates had taken place.

In religion, the Guises initially continued the repression of Protestantism started by King Henry II. From July 1559 to February 1560 they would pass four more persecutory edicts, including such provisions as the razing of any house which a Protestant meeting occurred in, and the prosecution of landlords who knowingly harboured heretics as tenants.

==== Amboise conspiracy ====
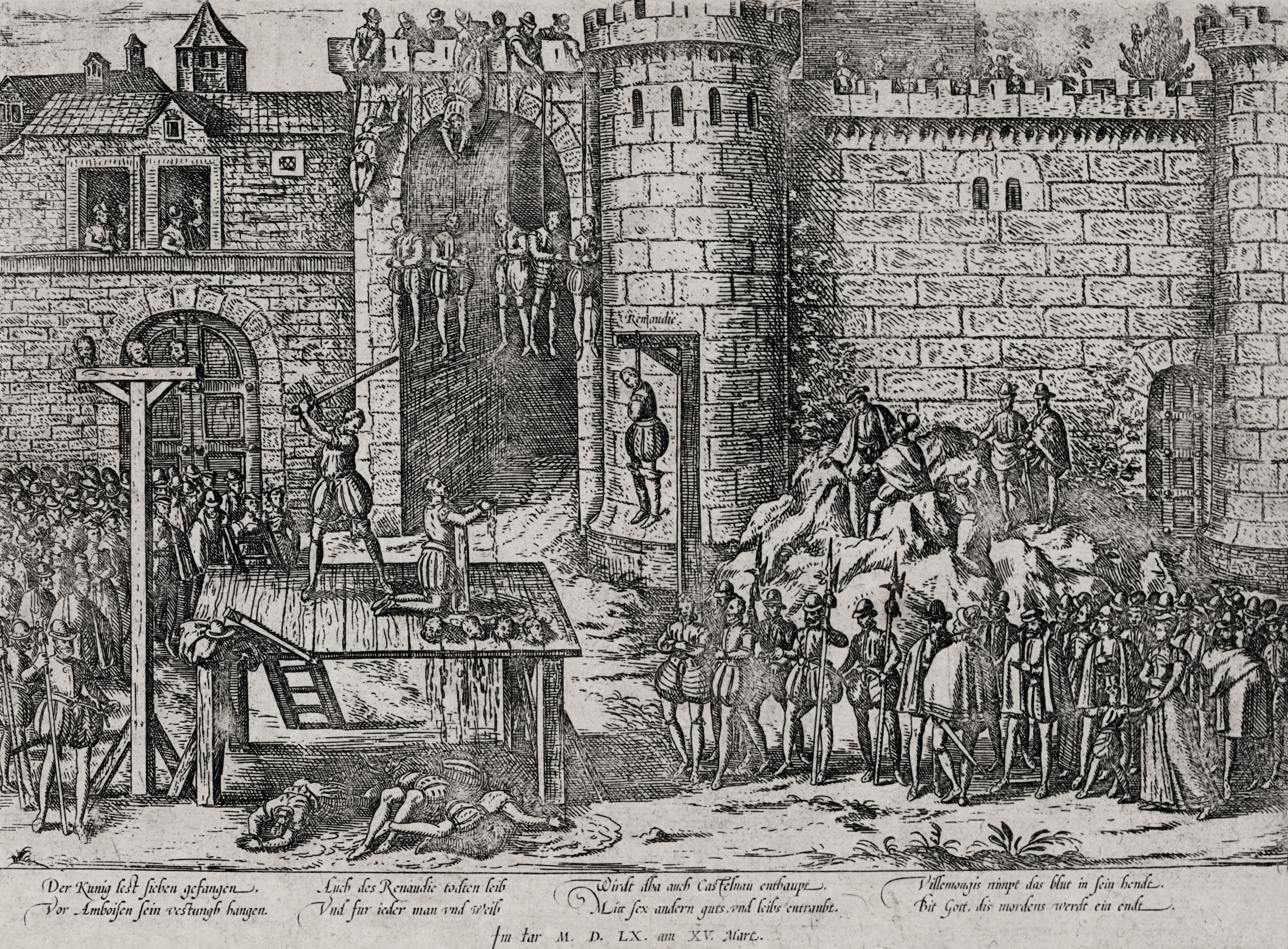
The execution of the conspirators at Amboise. Engraving by Jacques Tortorel and Jean Perrissin, 1569–1570

Opposition to the Guise administration which had been bubbling under the surface during Francis II's reign, coalesced around two primary axes. Firstly, there was religious opposition from Protestants, such as La Roche Chandieu; secondly, there was opposition from military men of the minor gentry, such as Castlenau; these groups came together under the leadership of the seigneur de la Renaudie to form a conspiracy to seize the king and arrest or kill the Cardinal de Lorraine and the Duke de Guise. The group planned to push for Antoine of Navarre to lead them, and become a 'regent' for Francis II. When he proved uninterested in their plot, they moved to the more dubious claim of his brother Condé. He was more receptive to the plan.

As details of the conspiracy were finalised and arms raised for the day, rumours began to leak out to the court of what was happening. Finally on 12 February while the court was travelling to Amboise, the Duke's secretary arrived, bringing a lawyer who had got cold feet about the direction of the conspiracy. The secretary revealed all the details to the Guise and Francis, including the name of the leader, La Renaudie.

With this knowledge to hand, and suspecting the involvement of Condé, the Guise summoned much of the high nobility to Amboise, and began fortifying the castle in preparation. In March the court struck, arresting a band of the conspirators who had assembled to discuss the delivery of money for the operation. Several days later a larger host of soldiers were bloodily repulsed from Amboise. On 17 March, Francis II made the duke of Guise the Lieutenant General of the kingdom, giving him final authority for all military matters. Realising the motley nature of the conspiracy, a mixture of fairly harmless heretics and hardened military men, an amnesty was declared on 17 March for those who laid down their arms and went home within 48 hours. Operations would continue as the court began to fan out troops into the countryside to mop up stragglers.

The court was left with a tricky situation as to how to deal with those captured alive. Interrogations began, attempting to prove a connection between Condé and the conspiracy. Condé denounced accusations thrown at him as the work of 'scum' and more pressingly for honour in aristocratic circles, propagated by 'liars.' The Queen Mother assured him that no one doubted his innocence. However, on 18 April his chambers were raided while he was attending the kings levée. Unable to find proof however, he was allowed to leave court. Condé hurried south, uniting with his brother Antoine in the south-west.

For the military conspirators who had remained under arms there would be little mercy, many would be executed in the following days, and hanged from the battlements as a warning. To the shock of members of the court, this included men of 'good birth' such as the Baron de Castlenau. Nevertheless, the court was conscious its religious policy had been a failure, and as early as 8 March, the Edict of Amboise was propagated, offering a retroactive amnesty for those convicted of heresy, on the condition they live as good Catholics. This began the distinction between the crimes of heresy and the crime of sedition, which had during the reign of Henri II been treated as a unified crime.

==== Amboise in the provinces ====
Whilst the rebellion outside the castle of Amboise may have been crushed, the situation was deteriorating in the provinces. Troops raised for the conspiracy in Dauphine, Provence, and the Lyonnais were left without central direction, creating the nucleus of guerrilla armies that caused chaos in their localities. Beyond the planned regional elements of Amboise, many Protestants began seizing churches independently, and engaging in acts of unauthorised iconoclasm, as in Rouen and Provence. During the summer, this rebellious movement gained intensity; several cities in southern France were by now engulfed in revolt.

The climax of the regional disorder came in the early autumn, where on 4 September in Lyon, a large stockpile of weapons was discovered in the city of Lyon by the authorities, after a brief firefight with a group of Protestants the weapons were seized, narrowly foiling a planned coup in the city by several days. The narrow foiling of this conspiracy only further enraged the king and his administration who suspected the involvement of Condé in this affair. This was confirmed when an agent of his carrying papers that implicated him was intercepted.

The king's reaction was fierce and determined: he mobilised his troops, sent the army to the rebellious areas to quell the sedition, and ordered governors to return to their positions. To isolate the renegade princes of the blood further the administration created two super-governorships giving one to Charles, Prince of La Roche-sur-Yon and the other to Louis, Duke of Montpensier, thus divorcing their interests from those of their cousins. Heavily outnumbered Condé and Navarre decided making a stand and fighting would be pointless, and they departed their southern regional powerbase at the kings request to attend the forthcoming Estates General.

==== Romorantin and the Estates General ====
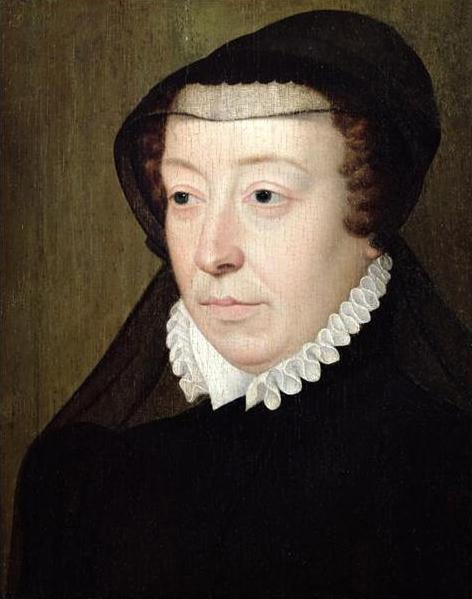
Portrait of Catherine de' Medici, mother of Francis II

This distinction between heresy and sedition, represented a new religious policy for the monarchy of France. While there was to be no allowance for heretical worship, it was hoped this would avoid needless bloodshed, and reunify the kingdom around the crown. This changing of the political winds was furthered when in April the former Guise client Michel de l'Hôpital became Lord Chancellor of France replacing the ailing François Olivier. Hôpital was a humanist Catholic, little interested in the persecution that had defined the administration in the 1550s. In conjunction with Charles Cardinal of Lorraine, Catherine de Medici and Admiral Coligny, he began pushing this new religious policy further.

In May 1560 a further edict was passed, the Edict of Romorantin. This edict denounced the spread of heresy in the kingdom, but also noted the failure of the policies on the 1550s. The edict proposed that going forth trial for heresy would be handled by the ecclesiastical courts instead of the Parlement. This was significant as the ecclesiastical courts lacked the ability to provide death sentences, and while they could technically still refer cases to the Parlements for sentencing, this acted as a de facto abolition of the death penalty for heresy. For more 'seditious' offences, such as heretical preaching, pamphlet producing and services, the Présidaux courts would have jurisdiction.

Conscious that the financial and religious problems of the crown had not yet gone away, and desiring to create a more definitive solution, the Guise oversaw the calling of an Assembly of Notables. Conscious that they were liable to be arrested, Condé and Navarre were not among the leading nobility who attended. Lorraine intended to guide the assembly towards his proposed idea of a national religious council, to reunify the two faiths peacefully, this was however taken off course by Coligny, who presented a petition from the Norman church seeking the right to establish temples. The duke of Guise was infuriated by this proposal, suggesting if two religions were tolerated 'his sword would not remain sheathed for long.' The assembly drew up a reform package of tax ideas, and closed by convening the Estates General to whom this package would be presented. It was initially intended to host this at Meaux before a location change to Orléans due to religious troubles at the former city.

Afraid the proposed council might be highly Gallican, the Pope decided to reopen the general council of Trent, but rejected the attendance of any Protestant, the demands of the French crown to scrap their proposed national council.

The calling of the Estates General presented an opportunity to bring Condé into line, and in October he was summoned to present himself at the Estates General. Upon arrival he and several associates were promptly arrested and put on trial. After filibustering the proceedings Condé would eventually be found guilty, and given an indeterminate sentence, likely imprisonment at Loches.

=== Foreign policy ===
In foreign policy, Francis II continued peace efforts Henry II had begun with the signing of the Peace of Cateau-Cambrésis in April 1559, which ended 40 years of war between France and the Habsburg empire. At the expense of its influence in Europe, France continued to restore lands conquered over the previous 40 years. In this sense, Francis II's reign began the decline of French influence throughout Europe, to the benefit of Spain.

When Henry II died, the restitution of these territories was well under way. Francis II, aware of the kingdom's weaknesses, reassured Spain of its intention to fulfill the treaty just signed. The Maréchal de Brissac, who displayed some unwillingness to evacuate Piedmont, was asked to change his behaviour and accelerate the withdrawal. By the autumn of 1559, France had completely left Savoy, and Piedmont, except for the five locations agreed upon in the Peace of Cateau-Cambrésis. If these were returned to the Duke of Savoy Emmanuel Philibert, Montferrat would be returned to Guglielmo Gonzaga, Duke of Mantua. Both were allies of Spain. Finally, Valenza, which Brissac was grumbling about releasing, was to be returned to the Spanish Duchy of Milan. On the Spanish side, King Philip II showed some unwillingness to return four locations in the northeast of the kingdom as required by the treaty. Border disputes renewed tensions between the two nations, but after months of protests Francis II finally obtained these territories.

Along with restitution of territories, the government of Francis II had to negotiate, pay, or claim compensations for people whose properties were taken or destroyed during the war. It also had to reach an agreement with Spain about the prisoners of war held by both sides. Many noblemen were still prisoners and unable to pay their ransom. Common soldiers were consigned to use as rowers on the royal galleys. Even after a reciprocal release compromise was signed, Spain was not eager to lose its prisoners.

When Francis II died, France withdrew from Scotland, Brazil, Corsica, Tuscany, Savoy and most of Piedmont.

==== Loss of Scotland ====
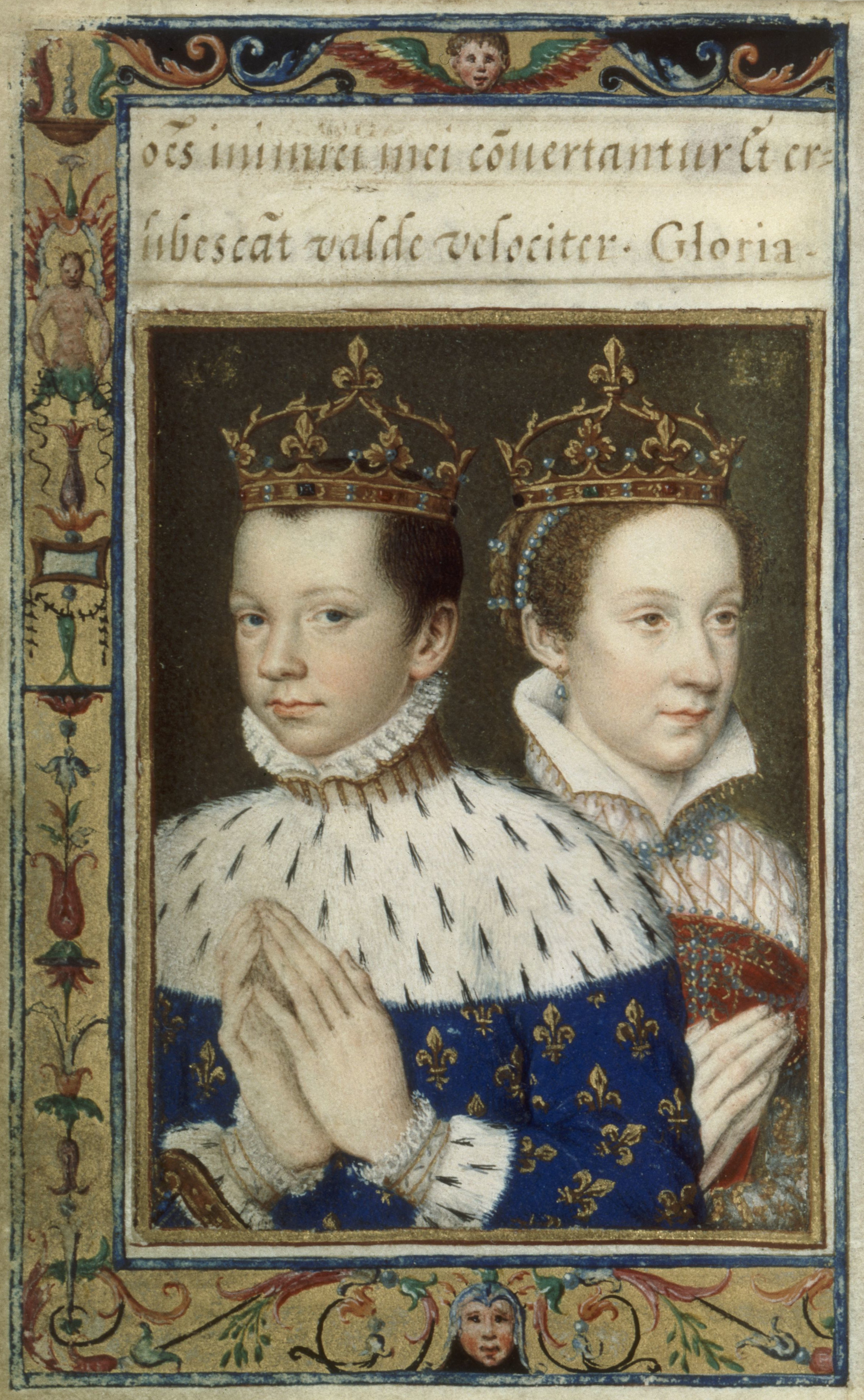
The king and his spouse Mary Stuart, Queen of Scots (painted around 1558). (Bibliothèque Nationale de France)

With the marriage of Francis II and Mary Stuart, the future of Scotland was linked to that of France. A secret clause signed by the queen provided that Scotland would become part of France if the royal couple did not have children. The queen's mother, Marie of Guise, was already regent for Scotland.

Because of French control over their country, a congregation of Scottish lords organised an uprising and made the regent and her French councils leave the capital, Edinburgh, in May 1559. Having taken refuge at the fortress of Dunbar, Marie of Guise asked France for help. Francis II and Mary Stuart sent troops right away. By the end of 1559, France had regained control of Scotland.

Nothing seemed to stand in the way of French control of Scotland apart from English support for the Scottish nobles. Queen Elizabeth I was still offended that Francis II and Mary Stuart had put on their coat of arms those of England, thus proclaiming Mary's claims on the throne of England. In January 1560, the English fleet blockaded the port of Leith, which French troops had turned into a military base. They were supported by the arrival in April of 6000 soldiers and 3000 horsemen, which began the siege of the city.

Just as English troops were not particularly successful, the French troops found themselves in a better strategic position. But the French government's poor financial situation and internal turmoil in the French kingdom prevented any military reinforcements from being sent. When the Bishop of Valence and Charles de La Rochefoucault, sieur of Randan, sent by the king to negotiate, arrived in Scotland, they were treated almost like prisoners. With Marie of Guise shut up in Edinburgh Castle, the two men were forced to negotiate a peace that was disadvantageous to France. On 6 July 1560, they signed the Treaty of Edinburgh, which ended French occupation of Scotland. Francis II and Mary Stuart had to withdraw French troops and stop displaying England's arms.

A few weeks later, the Parliament of Scotland established Protestantism as the state religion. When Francis II and Mary Stuart were presented with the Treaty of Edinburgh, they were outraged and refused to sign it; they also challenged the legitimacy of the Scottish parliament's decision.

== Death ==
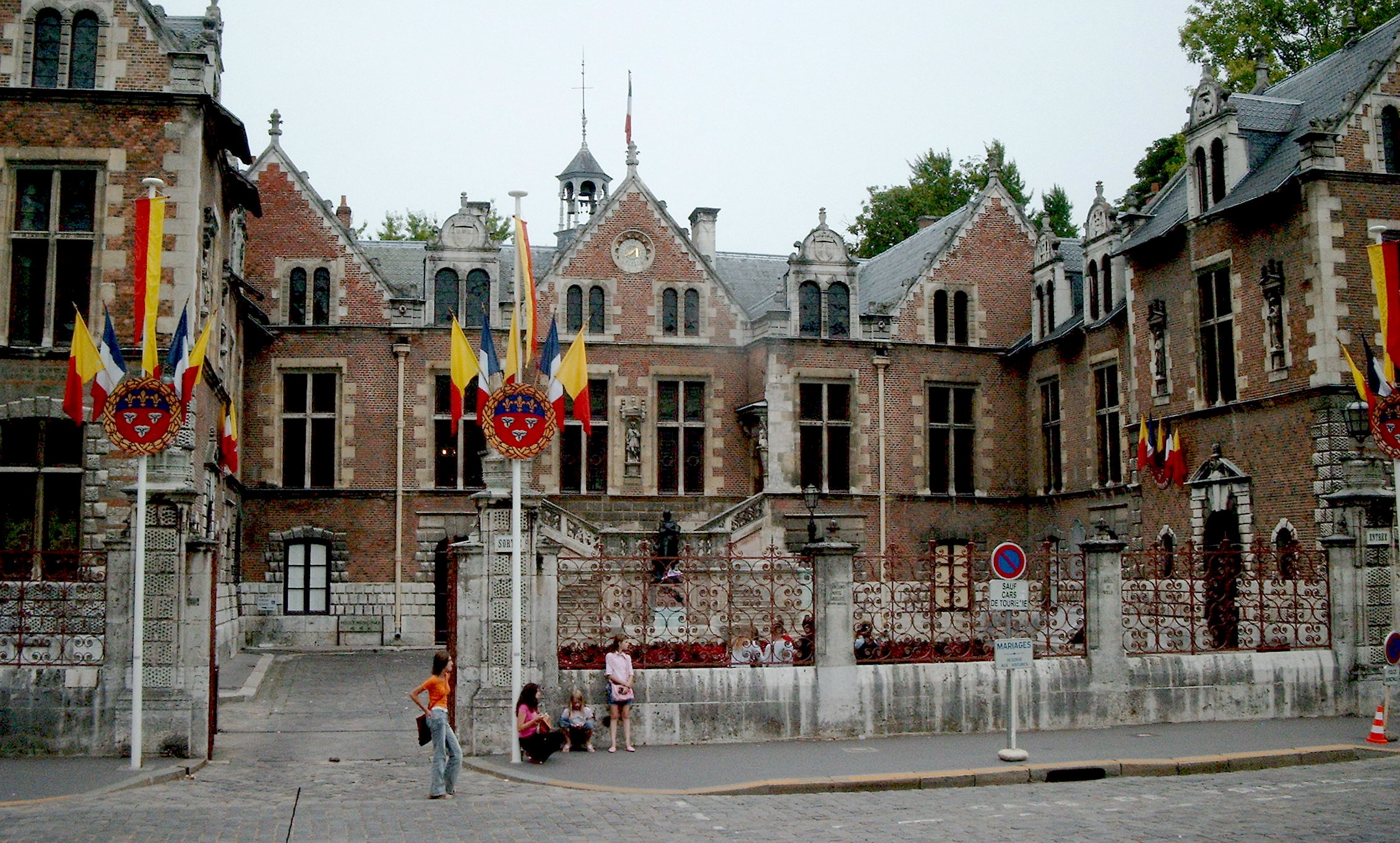
Francis II died in Orléans, at the hôtel Groslot (above).

The king's health deteriorated in November 1560. On 16 November he fainted. After only 17 months on the throne, Francis II died on 5 December 1560 in Orléans, Loiret, from an ear condition. Multiple diseases have been suggested, such as mastoiditis, meningitis, or otitis exacerbated into an abscess. Ambroise Paré, the royal surgeon, considered performing a trepanation. Some suspected Protestants of having poisoned the king, a view held by Catholics as the tensions between them and Protestants were on the rise, but this has not been proven.

Francis II died childless, so his younger brother Charles, then ten years old, succeeded him. On 21 December, the council named Catherine de' Medici, Regent of France. The Guises left the court, while Mary Stuart, Francis II's widow, returned to Scotland. Louis, Prince of Condé, who was jailed and awaiting execution, was freed after some negotiations with Catherine de Médici.

On 23 December 1560, Francis II's body was interred in the Basilica of St Denis by the Prince of La Roche-sur-Yon.

== Posterity ==
Francis II had a brief reign. He became king as an inexperienced teenager, at a time when the kingdom was struggling with religious troubles. Historians agree that Francis II was fragile, both physically and psychologically, and his frail health led to his early death. The question of whether his marriage was consummated or not remains unanswered.

== Arms ==
Royal arms of Francis, Dauphin and King consort of Scots

Royal arms of Mary, Queen of Scots, impaled with those of Francis

Royal arms of Francis II

Royal arms of Mary, Queen of Scots, Queen consort of France

Royal arms of Mary, Queen of Scots, Queen dowager of France

== Portrayals ==
Francis is portrayed by Toby Regbo in the CW show Reign, by Richard Denning in Mary, Queen of Scots (1971), by Sebastian Stragiotti-Axanciuc in Mary, Queen of Scots (2013), and by George Jaques in the TV drama The Serpent Queen.

Francis II of France House of Valois, Angoulême branch Cadet branch of the Capetian dynasty Born: 19 January 1544 Died: 5 December 1560
Regnal titles
Preceded by Henry II	King of France; 10 July 1559 – 5 December 1560	Succeeded by Charles IX
Scottish royalty
Vacant Title last held by Mary of Guise as queen consort	King consort of Scotland; 24 April 1558 – 5 December 1560	Vacant Title next held by Henry Stuart as consort
French royalty
Preceded by Henry	Dauphin of France; 31 March 1547 – 10 July 1559	Vacant Title next held by Louis
