= Jacqueline de Longwy =

Duchess of Montpensier (d. 1561)

- Duchess of Montpensier suo jure Countess of Bar-sur-Seine
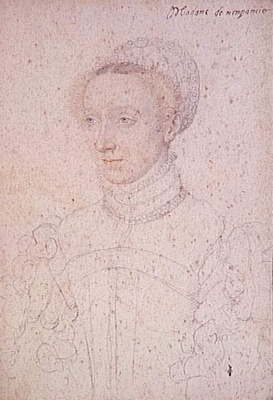
- Portrait of Jacqueline de Longwy drawn by François Clouet in 1550
- Born: c.1520
- Died: 28 August 1561; Paris, France
- Spouse: Louis de Bourbon
- Issue: Françoise, Duchess of Bouillon; Anne, Duchess of Nevers; François, Duke of Montpensier; Charlotte, Princess of Orange
- Father: Jean IV de Longwy
- Mother: Jeanne of Angoulême

Jacqueline de Longwy, Countess of Bar-sur-Seine (before 1520 – 28 August 1561), Duchess of Montpensier, Dauphine of Auvergne was a French noblewoman, and a half-niece of King Francis I of France. She was the first wife of Louis III de Bourbon, Duke of Montpensier, and the mother of his six children. She had the office of Première dame d'honneur to the queen dowager regent of France, Catherine de' Medici, from 1560 until 1561.

== Family ==
Jacqueline was born on an unknown date sometime before 1520, the youngest daughter of Jean IV de Longwy, Seigneur de Givry, Baron of Pagny and of Mirebeau and Jeanne of Angoulême, Countess of Bar-sur-Seine, the illegitimate half-sister of King Francis I of France.

Jacqueline had two older sisters. The eldest, Françoise de Longwy, Dame de Pagny and de Mirebeau (c.1510- after 14 April 1561), married firstly in 1526, Philippe de Chabot, Seigneur De Brion, Count of Charny and Buzançois, Admiral of France, and secondly in 1545, Jacques de Perusse, Seigneur d'Escars, by whom she had a son, Cardinal Anne d'Escars de Givry. Her second eldest sister was Claude Louise de Longwy, Abbess of Jouarre.

Jacqueline's paternal uncle was Claude de Longwy de Givry, Bishop of Amiens. Her paternal grandparents were Philippe de Longwy, Seigneur of Pagny and Jeanne de Bauffremont, Dame de Mirebeau. Her maternal grandparents were Charles, Count of Angoulême and his mistress Antoinette de Polignac, Dame de Combronde, who was a lady-in-waiting to the Count of Angoulême's wife, Louise of Savoy. Antoinette (born c.1460) was the daughter of Foucaud de Polignac, Seigneur des Fontaines and Agnès de Chabanais.

== Marriage ==
In 1538, Jacqueline married Louis III de Bourbon-Montpensier, who would become Duke of Montpensier on the death of his mother Louise de Bourbon, Duchess of Montpensier on 5 July 1561. On the occasion of the marriage, Jacqueline's uncle, King Francis restored the Montpensier estates and the counties of Forez, Beaujeu, and Dombes to Louis' mother. They had been confiscated by the French Crown following Charles III, Duke of Bourbon's treason in 1523 when he defected to the side of Emperor Charles V.

== Court career ==
Jacqueline de Longwy was introduced at court early on, which she attended from 1533 onward. She served as Fille d’honneur to Eleanor of Austria in 1533-38, as Dame after her marriage in 1538-43; served as Dame to Mary Stuart in 1560, and subsequently appointed Première dame d'honneur to Catherine de' Medici in succession to Françoise de Brézé, when Catherine became regent and was able to appoint her own household.

She was a personal friend of Catherine de' Medici, who became queen in 1547. In 1560, Jacqueline de Longwy had been instrumental in the successful negotiations to convince Antoine de Bourbon to relinquish his claims to the regency of Charles in favor of Catherine de' Medici.

== Countess of Bar-sur-Seine ==
Jacqueline succeeded to the title of suo jure Countess of Bar-sur-Seine upon her mother's death, which occurred on an unknown date sometime after 1531/1538. Her father's titles had passed to her eldest sister, Françoise upon his death in 1520.

In 1543, the dauphinate of Auvergne was restored to Louis, Jacqueline therefore became the Dauphine of Auvergne. That same year, she was present with other high-ranking members of the Valois court at the baptism of King Francis's grandson, Francis. In 1547, King Francis died and was succeeded by his son Henry. In 1556, Jacqueline, together with Diane de Poitiers and Madame de Montmorency, was appointed by Queen consort Catherine de Medici to judge the case of misconduct against Mademoiselle de Rohan, a member of the royal family, who was pregnant by the Duke of Nemours under promise of marriage. Three years later, in 1559, Jacqueline and her husband attended the magnificent coronation of King Francis II and Mary, Queen of Scots.

== Death ==
She died in Paris on 28 August 1561. She had been the Duchess of Montpensier for less than two months.

Through her daughter, Charlotte, Jacqueline was an ancestress of the House of Hanover, which reigned in Great Britain from 1714 to 1901, and from which descends the current British royal family.

== Issue ==
Jacqueline and Louis had:

1. François de Bourbon, Duke of Montpensier (1542- 4 June 1592), married in 1566, Renée d'Anjou, Marquise de Mézières (21 October 1550–1597), daughter of Nicolas d'Anjou, Marquis de Mézières and Gabrielle de Mareuil, by whom he had one son, Henri de Bourbon, Duke of Montpensier.
2. Françoise de Bourbon (1539–1587), in 1559 married Henri-Robert de La Marck, Duke of Bouillon, Prince of Sedan
3. Anne de Bourbon (1540 1577), in 1561 married François de Cleves, Duke of Nevers
4. Jeanne de Bourbon, Abbess of Jouarre (1541–1620)
5. Charlotte de Bourbon (1547- 5 May 1582), on 24 June 1575, married William The Silent of Nassau, Prince of Orange, by whom she had six daughters
6. Louise de Bourbon, Abbess of Faremoutier (1548–1586)

== In art ==
Jacqueline de Longwy's portrait was drawn in 1550 by French painter François Clouet.

== Notes ==
Court offices
Preceded by Françoise de Brézé	Première dame d'honneur to Catherine de' Medici; 1560–1561	Succeeded by Philippes de Montespedon
