= Jeanne d'Angoulême =

French suo jure Countess of Bar-sur-Seiene (c. 1490–1538)

Jeanne
- Countess of Bar-sur-Seine
- Born: c. 1490 (legitimised August 1501); Angoulême, France
- Died: 1531/1538; France
- Noble family: House of Valois-Angoulême
- Spouses: Jean Aubin; Jean de Longwy
- Issue: Françoise, Dame de Pagny and de Mirebeau; Claude Louise, Abbess of Jouarre; Jacqueline, Duchess of Montpensier
- Father: Charles, Count of Angoulême
- Mother: Antoinette de Polignac, Dame de Combronde

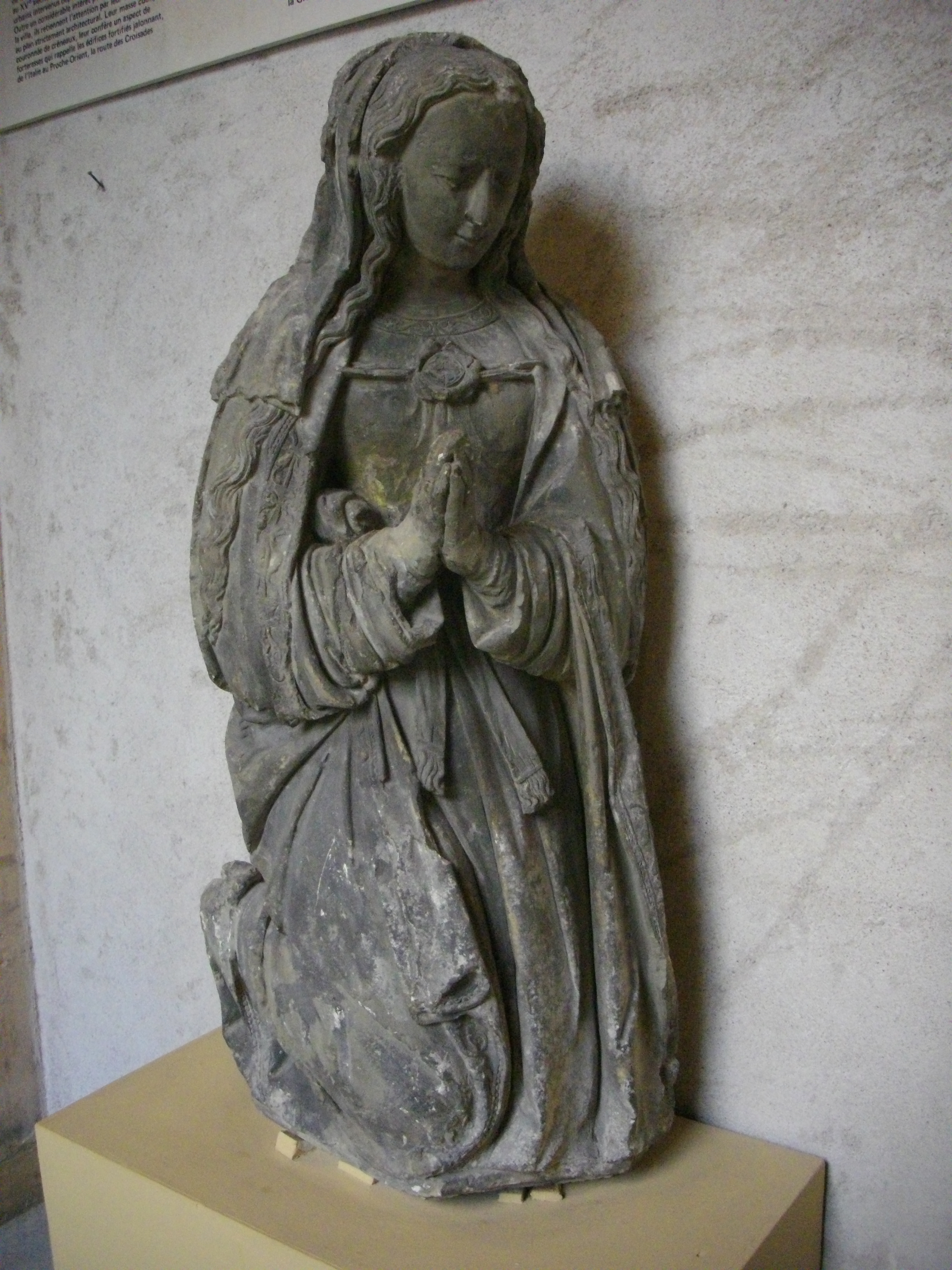
Jeanne of Orléans, 16th-century limestone statue, from Petit-Clairvaux priory of Metz, kept in Musées de la Cour d'Or (Metz, Moselle, France)

Jeanne d'Angoulême, Countess of Bar-sur-Seine (c. 1490 – after 1531/1538), Dame de Givry, Baroness of Pagny and of Mirebeau, was a half-sister of King Francis I of France and princess Marguerite de Navarre. She was created suo jure Countess of Bar-sur-Seine in 1522. She was the wife of Jean de Longwy, Seigneur of Givry, Baron of Pagny and of Mirebeau.

== Life ==
Jeanne was born in Angoulême about 1490, the illegitimate daughter of Charles, Count of Angoulême and his mistress Antoinette de Polignac. Antoinette served as the chatelaine of the Charles' chateaux, and became a lady-in-waiting and confidante to his young wife Louise of Savoy whom he married on 16 February 1488.

When Charles died on 1 January 1496, Jeanne, her sisters, and her mother Antoinette were allowed to remain in the Angoulême household now presided over by Louise of Savoy, the widowed Countess. In 1499, Louise moved the family from the chateau of Cognac to the court of King Louis XII, who was her father's cousin. Jeanne was raised alongside her legitimate siblings, Francis, who was now the Count of Angoulême, Duke of Valois and heir presumptive to the Kingdom of France, and Marguerite. She was legitimised in Lyon in August 1501 by Louis XII on the occasion of her marriage.

Jeanne had a full sister, Madeleine (died 26 October 1543), who became Abbess of Fontevrault and another half-sister, Souveraine (died 23 February 1551), from Charles' relationship with Jeanne le Conte. By her mother's marriage to Béraud of L'Espinasse, Seigneur de Combronde, Jeanne had another half-sister, Françoise of L'Espinasse. Jeanne's half-brother, Francis was crowned King of France on 25 January 1515. On 24 March 1522, she was created suo jure Countess Bar-sur-Seine by her half-brother Francis, who had succeeded Louis as King in 1515.

Jeanne married her first husband, Jean Aubin, Seigneur de Malicorne, in August 1501. The marriage was childless. Sometime after his death, she married Jean IV de Longwy, Seigneur de Givry, Baron of Pagny and of Mirebeau, by whom she had three daughters:

- Françoise de Longwy, Dame de Pagny and de Mirebeau (c. 1510- after 14 April 1561), on 10 January 1526, she married, Philippe de Chabot, Seigneur of Brion, Count of Charny and Buzançois, Admiral of France (c. 1492- 1 June 1543);in 1545, she married, Jacques de Perusse, Seigneur d'Escars.
- Claude Louise de Longwy, Abbess of Jouarre.
- Jacqueline de Longwy, Countess of Bar-sur-Seine (before 1520- 28 August 1561), married in 1538, Louis III de Bourbon, Duke of Montpensier.

Jeanne's husband died in 1520. His titles were inherited by their eldest daughter, Françoise.

Jeanne served as Première dame d'honneur to the queen of France, Eleanor of Austria, in 1535–1538.

Jeanne died on an unknown date sometime after 1538. Her youngest daughter, Jacqueline succeeded her as Countess of Bar-sur-Seine.

== Sources ==
- Armstrong, Alastair (2003). France, 1500-1715. Heinemann.
- Couchman, Jane (1997). "Charlotte of Bourbon's Correspondence: Using Words to Implement Emancipation". In Winn, Colette H.; Kuizenga, Donna (eds.). Women Writers in Pre-revolutionary France: Strategies of Emancipation. Garland Publishing Inc.
- Knecht, R.J. (1982). Francis I. Cambridge University Press.
- Potter, David (2004). Foreign Intelligence and Information in the Elizabethan England:Two English Treatises on the State of France, 1580-1584. Cambridge University Press.
