= Louis, Duke of Montpensier =

Louis
- Duke of Montpensier
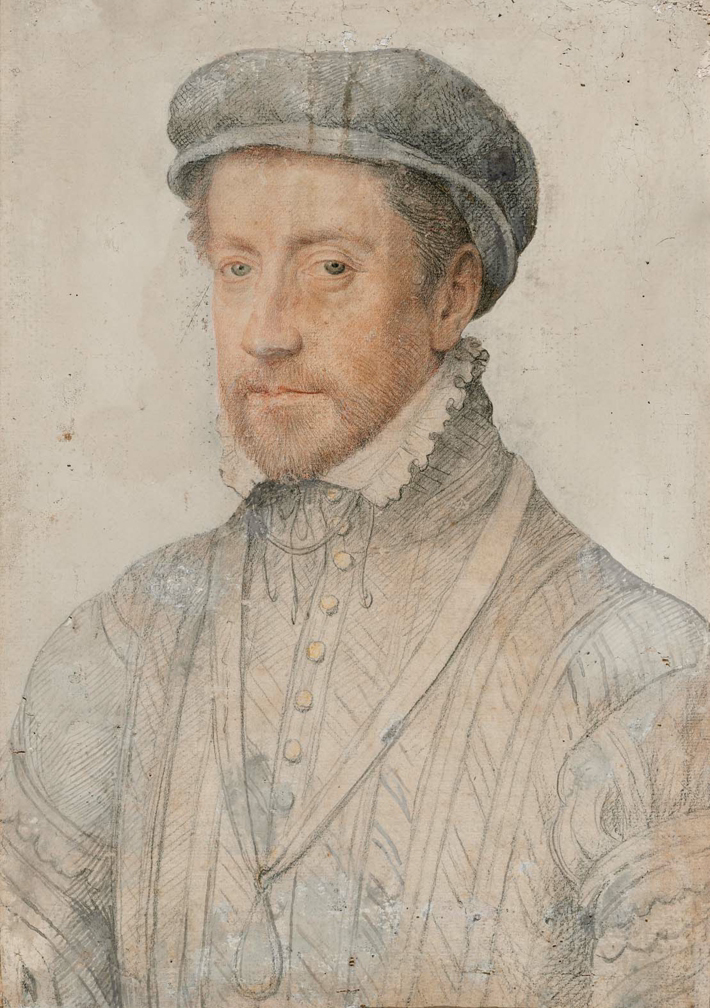
- Born: 10 June 1513; Moulins
- Died: 23 September 1582 (aged 69); Champigny
- Spouse: Jacqueline de Longwy; Catherine of Lorraine
- Issue: Françoise, Duchess of Bouillon; Anne, Duchess of Nevers; François, Duke of Montpensier; Charlotte, Princess of Orange
- Father: Louis, Prince of La Roche-sur-Yon
- Mother: Louise, Duchess of Montpensier
- Religion: Catholic

Louis, Duc de Montpensier (10 June 1513 – 23 September 1582) was the second Duke of Montpensier, a French Prince of the Blood, military commander and governor. He began his military career during the Italian Wars, and in 1557 was captured after the disastrous battle of Saint-Quentin. Once free, he found himself courted by Lorraine-Guise government of the French kingdom as it sought to steady itself and isolate its opponents in the wake of the Conspiracy of Amboise. At this time Montpensier supported liberalising religious reform, as typified by the Edict of Amboise he was present for the creation of.

The Guise administration granted him a large super-governorship centred on the Duchy of Anjou in 1560, a territory he would govern for the next five years before handing it over to his son in 1565. By 1561, he was becoming increasingly alienated from the crown's religious policy and moved into opposition with Anne de Montmorency and François, Duke of Guise. As France fell into the French Wars of Religion the following year, he fought for the crown, heading out at the head of a flying column after the security of Paris was assured, brutally massacring the Protestants of Angers after having subdued the town. In the peace that followed, he allied himself with the Guise in their vendetta with the Montmorency, supporting them through both legal and extra-legal means. In 1565 his brother died, and he become governor of Dauphiné, relinquishing this governorship too in 1567 to his son. During the second civil war he again fought for the crown, besting Protestants that sought to join the main force besieging Paris. On the death of Montmorency, he guided the young Anjou in his leadership of the army. In the third civil war, he again defeated a Protestant army of the south trying to link up with the main body. He also committed another massacre at Mussidan. When Martigues died during the siege of Saint-Jean-d'Angély, Montpensier took up his governorship of Brittany.

In 1572, he supported the Massacre of Saint Bartholomew, unsuccessfully trying to incubate it in Nantes while succeeding in Saumur and Angers. During the fifth civil war he fought in the west, reducing the towns of Lusignan and Fontenay before being recalled to Paris. With a favourable peace declared for the Protestants, Ligues rose up in opposition to it, with the support of the Guise. Montpensier had by now tired of the militant Catholicism he had held for the past decades, and through his support behind toleration and peace, arguing unsuccessfully that it was the only policy that would save France in front of the Estates General. His realignment brought him benefits, precedence over the Guise in ceremony. In 1581, he was tasked with leading a mission to England to secure a marriage between Elizabeth I of England and Alençon, he proved too ill however and had to send his son in his stead. In 1582, his son conducted an army into the Netherlands in support of Alençon's kingship there. He died that year. Henri who had agreed to let his son inherit his governorship of Brittany reneged and provided the province to the ultra Mercœur.

== Early life and family ==
His coat-of-arms.

Louis was the son of Louis, Prince of La Roche-sur-Yon, and of Louise, first Duchess of Montpensier. By his mother, he was the nephew of Charles, Duke of Bourbon, whose lands were confiscated after his treason. As a member of the House of Bourbon, he was a Prince of the Blood. In 1538, Louis married Jacqueline de Longwy, Countess of Bar-sur-Seine, daughter of John IV de Longwy, Baron of Pagny, and Jeanne of Angoulême, illegitimate half-sister of King Francis I. On the occasion of his marriage, the King of France returned the lands of Gilbert, Count of Montpensier, and the Counties of Forez, Beaujeu and Dombes to his mother. After her death in 1561, he re-married on 4 February 1570, to Catherine de Lorraine, sister of Henry I, Duke of Guise and of Charles of Lorraine, Duke of Mayenne. His first marriage afforded him a dowry of 60,000 livres, his second a dowry of 200,000 livres.

Louis and Jacqueline had:

- Françoise of Bourbon (1539–1587), married in 1559 to Henri-Robert de La Marck, Duke of Bouillon and Prince of Sedan
- Anne of Bourbon (1540–1572), married on 6 September 1561 François II de Clèves, son of François I, the duke of Nevers;
- Jeanne of Bourbon (1541–1620), Abbess of Jouarre;
- François (1542–1592), Duke of Montpensier
- Charlotte of Bourbon (1547–1582), Abbess of Jouarre, married in 1571 to William "the Silent" of Nassau, Prince of Orange
- Louise of Bourbon (1548–1586), Abbess of Faremoutier.

== Reign of Henri II ==
Louis took part in a number of wars against Charles V. He fought again at the Battle of St. Quentin (1557) where his horse was killed under him and he was taken prisoner.

== Reign of François II ==
=== Conspiracy of Amboise ===
After the abrupt death of Henri II his young son François came to the throne. His government was controlled by the Guise family, who faced opposition from several factions to their ascendency. This opposition coalesced into the Conspiracy of Amboise in which an attempt was made to kidnap the king and kill the Guise brothers. During the crisis the Edict of Amboise was published from the castle, offering amnesty to those convicted of heresy under certain conditions, the first step towards toleration the crown had undertaken.

In the immediate aftermath of the attempt on the castle of Amboise, flying columns were sent out under several military leaders to crush subsidiary uprisings in various towns. Montpensier was sent with troops to restore order in Angers. Successfully besting this challenge, the Guise were conscious that Condé was likely involved, and as instability continued to rock France in the following months, they sought to isolate him from the other Princes of the Blood, his cousins Montpensier and La Roche-sur-Yon. To this end two super-governorships were created for the princes. For Montpensier a governorship centred on Anjou was combined with Touraine, Maine, Perche, Vendômois, Blois and Amboise. His brother meanwhile received a governorship centred on the Duchy of Orléans. To support him in administering this super-governorship, the sieur de Savigny was delegated as lieutenant-general for the territories.

== Reign of Charles IX ==
With the premature death of François shortly after Condé's arrest, in December 1560, his brother Charles IX ascended to the throne. While the Guise were no longer central in the new administration, the Bourbon-Montpensiers were courted by Catherine as a key part of her regency government.

=== Alienation ===
In July 1561, Montpensier travelled to Touraine, to oversee the burial of his mother. As he travelled through the territory it became apparent to him that many were openly practicing Protestantism in his territory. In response he had over one hundred Protestants imprisoned at Chinon. In response thousands of Protestants assembled and besieged him in one of his residences, he capitulated and released the Protestants he had imprisoned. He was summoned to court, where he was chastised for his arresting of the Protestants. Frustrated at his inability to command respect in his territories Montpensier requested permission from the court to retire to his estates, as his orders were disobeyed and he was unable to satisfy his clients requests.

Increasingly alienated from the crown by their toleration policy, he associated himself with the rapprochement between François, Duke of Guise and Anne de Montmorency in 1561, joining them in their agreement to protect the Catholic faith from 'heresy'.

=== First war of religion ===
In his role as governor he held responsibility over the town of Angers, which rose up in rebellion during the first French War of Religion. Upon overseeing the re-taking of the town Montpensier had many of the towns Protestants murdered. Montpensier counselled the town leaders to exclude Protestants from office to avoid a repeat of the coup. He was pleased with their progress in bringing order back to the town, praising the town authorities for the work they had done in 1564. With the rebel momentum dissipating after July 1562, Montpensier and Jacques d'Albon were sent out at the head of flying columns to consolidate the royal hold of the Loire and Poitou.

=== Peace ===
In 1563, Louis reconquered Angoulême and Cognac. With the first civil war being brought to a close by the Edict of Amboise the crown had great concern that the Parlement of Paris would fight its registration as they had past edicts that granted toleration. To ensure that it would be pushed through two princes of the blood were selected to present it to the body, Cardinal Bourbon and Montpensier. The court registered the edict, though not without protest. Throughout the 1560s he was a regular feature of the conseil privé siding with the extreme Catholic wing of the council. Despite his extreme-Catholic affiliation, his kinship ties with the Protestant Duke of Bouillon meant that he campaigned for his reinstatement as governor of Normandy, the duke would be restored to his office.

=== Vendetta ===
He found himself again in alliance with the Guise family in the vendetta they were pursuing against Coligny. The family blamed Coligny for the assassination of the duke of Guise at the siege of Orléans in 1563. To this end he supported their petition to the king demanding the right to pursue justice against the Admiral, but the crown was not interested in allowing this vendetta to progress and refused. In 1565 frustrated at the failure to achieve satisfaction via legal methods the Guise family turned to the idea of forming a Ligue of nobles to pursue their vendetta. Noble supporters included Chavigny, Jean IV de Brosse and Montpensier. However this would also go nowhere.

In his capacity as governor of Anjou, he clashed with Jeanne d'Albret over the implementation of the Edict of Amboise. This climaxed after the murder of the Protestant lieutenant-general of Vendóme, Jeanne having several suspected perpetrators arrested, while Montpensier sought their release. The crown decided in favour of Jeanne and Montpensier was relieved of his office after a stream of frustrated missives reached the court. He was granted permission to resign the super-governorship in favour of his son. Upon the death of his brother the same year, he took up La Roche-sur-Yon's governorship of Dauphiné, though he only held the role for two years before resigning it in favour of his son as he had his Anjou governorship.

=== Second war of religion ===
After the failure of the Surprise of Meaux in which Condé had sought to capture the king and kill his prominent ultra Catholic advisers, civil war resumed. With Condé attempting to secure a quick victory through a siege of Paris, Montpensier in conjunction with Martigues blocked attempts to supplement his forces, defeating an army intended for him from Provence. When a large enough royal army was assembled in Paris, Constable Montmorency led the force out against Condé, besting him in a pyrrhic battle in which the constable was killed. To replace him the court wished to avoid a powerful noble independent of the crown holding the critical military office. As a result the king's brother Anjou was chosen. Still a teenager, Artus de Cossé-Brissac, Jacques, Duke of Nemours and Montpensier were assigned to guide his military decision making. Montpensier led the vanguard as Anjou's army moved out of Paris in pursuit of the fleeing Condé who was leading his forces towards the German border.

=== Third war of religion ===
The peace that followed the second civil war proved illusory and soon the French wars of religion had resumed. Having fled the court, Condé now operated out of western France. Montpensier launched a surprise attack on the town of Poitiers which had risen in favour of Condé. He was joined in this attack by Anjou who brought the main royal army, however progress was minimal. The viscounts of southern France rose to supplement Condé's army shortly thereafter, and while some reached him, Montpensier bested a column of reinforcements in Périgord on 25 October in combination with Marshal Cossé. By now his position was overextended and he was harried by the main Protestant army, pursued until he had joined Anjou's main force at Châtelleraut in November 1568. In 1569 he oversaw the capture of Mussidan from the Protestant rebels. In charge of the town he allowed his troops to massacre the population. Upon the death of governor Martigues during the siege of Saint-Jean-d'Angély, Montpensier became governor of Brittany. In 1575 it was agreed that upon his death his grandson would be able to inherit the governorship automatically.

=== Marriage ===
The following year, 1570, a marriage was agreed between Condé and his cousin Marie de Clèves. The ceremony went ahead without Papal dispensation which was required given the close relation. Disgusted that the marriage had been conducted in the Protestant fashion and without Papal approval voiced his disapproval to Charles and refused to attend the wedding. At court Coligny was pushing aggressively for war with Spain, believing it would unite the Protestants and Catholics behind the king. Montpensier was among the super-majority on the council who felt the kingdom was in no position to conduct a war with Spain. While maintaining his ultra-Catholicism, he disassociated himself from the Guise at this time, finding his relationship with them inconvenient while they were in the political wilderness.

As Jeanne d'Albret neared death, she drew up a will, outlining how her sons would maintain her faith. Montpensier was chosen as one of the executors of the will, alongside Cardinal Bourbon and Admiral Coligny.

=== Massacre of Saint Bartholomew ===
In the confusion that followed the Massacre of Saint Bartholomew in Paris, some notables at the court sought to take advantage of the chaos to spread the massacre out into the provinces where they held office. A letter was sent from Montpensier to the mayor of Nantes which implied Charles wanted him to follow 'his example' in Paris, and murder the Protestants of Nantes. The mayor however was cautious, keeping the letter a secret until such time he had direct orders from the king which confirmed that he did not in fact want a massacre.

=== Malcontents ===
The civil wars were now no longer so clearly delineated on religious grounds, and when a conspiracy arose to jailbreak Condé and Navarre, many Catholic notables including Damville joined them in the plan. The plan was discovered however and Montpensier was tasked with heading into Poitou to restore order.

== Reign of Henri III ==
=== Fifth war of religion ===
In the wake of the Conspiracy of the Malcontents, France once more found itself pulled into civil war. Henri III, recently returned from Poland-Lithuania prepared several armies to meet the opposition, under the command of Guise, Montpensier and himself. In January 1575 Montpensier had been campaigning around La Rochelle, seizing critical subsidiary towns around the major centre of resistance to the crowns authority. Montpensier drove his army into Poitou at the king's instruction.

They would be unable to achieve victory, and with Alençon's flight from court a favourable peace for the Malcontents would be granted. Montpensier had by this time departed from his combat in the west to bring reinforcements to the king, which led to all his work in the west being undone by new rebellion. During his time in Poitou he had successfully reduced the towns of Lusignan and Fontenay. At this time Montpensier found himself in a dispute of privileges with the Guise, over who had precedence in Parlement.

With peace established, Catholic Ligues began forming across France in opposition to its terms. Henri wrote frustratedly to Montpensier in his capacity as governor of Brittany chastising those who joined in Ligues in his territory. Henri urged Montpensier to do what he could to suppress these attempted Ligues.

=== Political realignment ===
Montpensier acted as a diplomat in the negotiations between Damville and Navarre who were once again flirting with rebellion, and the king. His efforts, including a plea before the estates general that war would solve nothing, and that toleration was necessary at least for the short term to stop the kingdom collapsing. This represented a dramatic political shift from the position he had held during Saint Bartholomew and the early wars. This passionate speech was unable to stop the outbreak of conflict once more. He further presented a remonstrance to the king's council, signed by 24 nobles opposing the resumption of war. Henri thanked him for the remonstrance but indicated he had to follow the will of the majority of his council and the estates, which had voted for war. The war was short, concluded by the Treaty of Bergerac a few months later in September 1577. His political shift towards toleration brought him benefit in his long running feud for precedence with the Guise, as he was granted seniority of position in ceremonies over the house.

By 1579 the south of France was struggling under the burden of having seen decades of civil war. Armed peasant bands of both religions were arming for self defence and taking the fight to the nobility. Henri tasked Catherine with heading south to bring some peace and order to the troubled region. Accompanying her on her mission were the Cardinal Bourbon and Montpensier.

=== Diplomat ===
In 1581 Montpensier was again tasked to play the diplomat. This time to head to England to negotiate a marriage between Alençon and Elizabeth I. By this point however he was becoming seriously ill, and he had to withdraw from the planned delegation, his son being entrusted with leading the delegation in his stead.

Despite the failure of the mission to England, Alençon still had hopes of becoming a king, and his attention turned to the Netherlands which had declared its independence from Spain. William of Orange, keen for advantage for the fledgeling state was open to the idea of Alençon becoming king of the Netherlands. In 1582 Alençon was installed as king, however his position was tenuous given the continued fighting with Spain. To support him in his hold on the state, baron de Biron and Montpensier's son were tasked with reinforcing him, they arrived on 1 December.

With the death of Montpensier the same year, his grandson had been due to inherit his governorship of Brittany. However Henri overruled the plan, granting the region to Mercœur an ally of the Guise.

== Ancestry ==
Ancestors of Louis, Duke of Montpensier

16. John I, Count of La Marche
8. Louis, Count of Vendôme
17. Catherine de Vendôme
4. Jean VIII, Count of Vendôme
18. Guy XIII de Laval
9. Jeanne de Laval
19. Anne de Laval
2. Louis, Prince of La Roche-sur-Yon
10. Louis de Beauvau, Seneschal of Anjou
5. Isabelle de Beauvau
11. Marguerite de Chambley
1. Louis, Duke of Montpensier
24. John I, Duke of Bourbon
12. Louis I, Count of Montpensier
25. Marie de Berry, Duchess d'Auvergne
6. Gilbert, Count of Montpensier
13. Gabrielle La Tour
3. Louise, Duchess of Montpensier
28. Ludovico III Gonzaga, Marquis of Mantua
14. Federico I Gonzaga, Marquess of Mantua
29. Barbara of Brandenburg
7. Clara Gonzaga
30. Albert III, Duke of Bavaria
15. Margaret of Bavaria
31. Anna, Duchess of Brunswick-Grubenhagen

== Sources ==
- Benedict, Philip (1978). "The Saint Bartholomew's Massacres in the Provinces". The Historical Journal. 21 2.
- Carroll, Stuart (2005). Noble Power during the French Wars of Religion: The Guise Affinity and the Catholic Cause in Normandy. Cambridge University Press.
- Carroll, Stuart (2009). Martyrs and Murderers: The Guise Family and the Making of Europe. Oxford University Press.
- Diefendorf, Barbara (1991). Beneath the Cross: Catholics and Huguenots in Sixteenth Century Paris. Oxford University Press.
- Harding, Robert (1978). Anatomy of a Power Elite: the Provincial Governors in Early Modern France. Yale University Press.
- George, Hereford B. (1885). Genealogical Tables Illustrative of Modern History (2nd ed.). Oxford at the Clarendon Press.
- Holt, Mack (2002). The Duke of Anjou and the Politique Struggle During the Wars of Religion. Cambridge University Press.
- Jouanna, Arlette (2007). The St Bartholomew's Day Massacre: The Mysteries of a Crime of State. Manchester University Press.
- Knecht, Robert (1998). Catherine de' Medici. Routledge.
- Knecht, Robert (2010). The French Wars of Religion, 1559-1598. Routledge.
- Knecht, Robert (2016). Hero or Tyrant? Henry III, King of France, 1574-1589. Routledge.
- Pitts, Vincent J. (2009). Henri IV of France: His Reign and Age. The Johns Hopkins University Press.
- Potter, David, ed. (2004). Foreign Intelligence and Information in Elizabethan England. Vol. 25: Two English Treatises on the State of France, 1580–1584. Cambridge University Press.
- Roberts, Penny (2013). Peace and Authority during the French Religious Wars c.1560-1600. Palgrave Macmillan.
- Roelker, Nancy (1968). Queen of Navarre: Jeanne d'Albret 1528-1572. Harvard University Press.
- Roelker, Nancy (1996). One King, One Faith: The Parlement of Paris and the Religious Reformation of the Sixteenth Century. University of California Press.
- Salmon, J.H.M (1975). Society in Crisis: France during the Sixteenth Century. Metheun & Co.
- Shimizu, J. (1970). Conflict of Loyalties: Politics and Religion in the Career of Gaspard de Coligny, Admiral of France, 1519–1572. Geneva: Librairie Droz.
- Sutherland, Nicola (1980). The Huguenot Struggle for Recognition. Yale University Press.
- Thompson, James (1909). The Wars of Religion in France 1559-1576: The Huguenots, Catherine de Medici and Philip II. Chicago University Press.
- Wood, James (2002). The Kings Army: Warfare, Soldiers and Society during the Wars of Religion in France, 1562-1576. Cambridge University Press.
