= Philippes de Montespedon =

French princess and courtier (d. 1578)

Philippe(s) de Montespedon
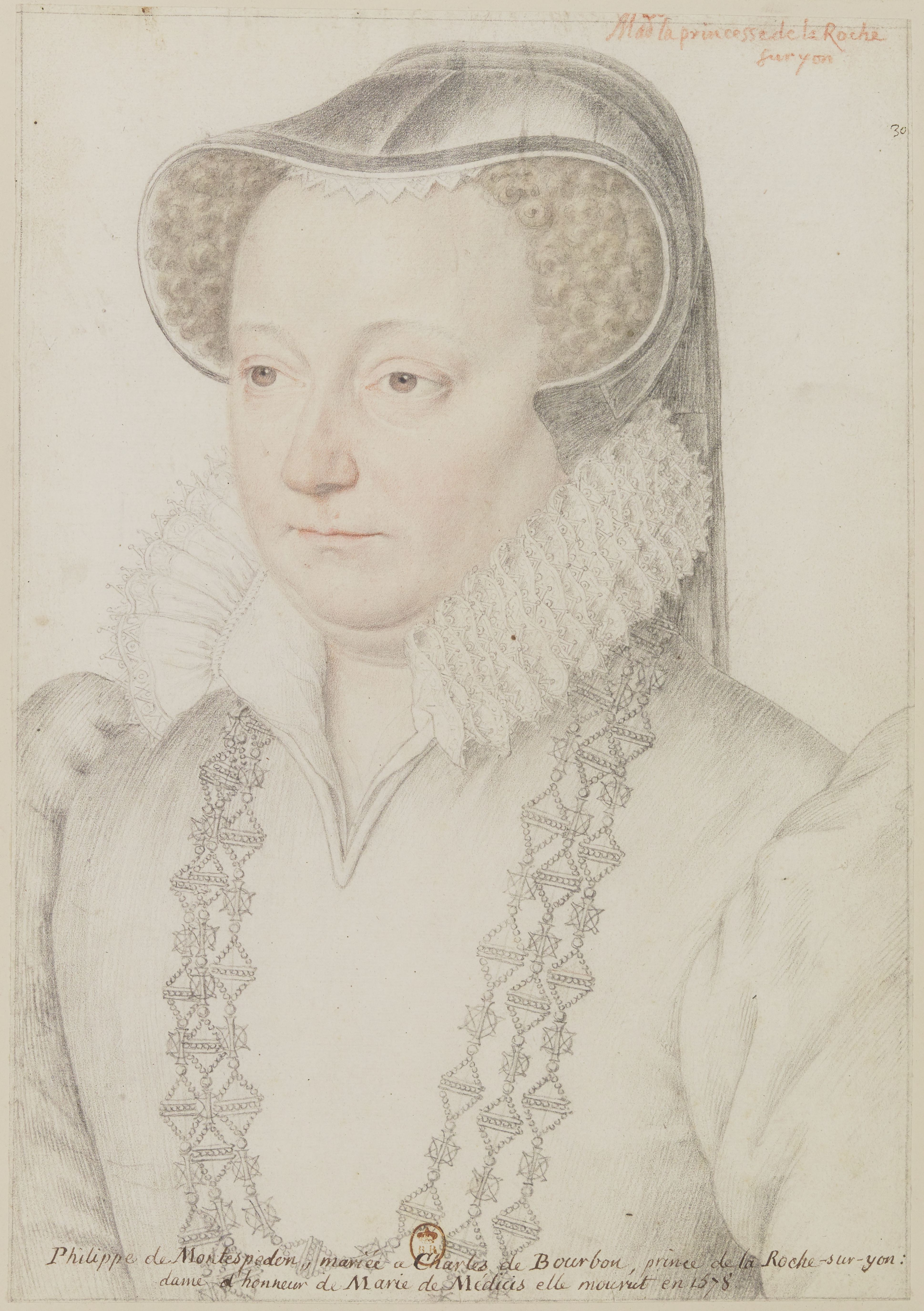
- Portrait de Philippe de Montespedon par l'anonyme Lécurieux
- Died: 1578
- Occupation: Première dame d'honneur

Philippe(s) de Montespedon, Princess of La Roche-sur-Yon, Dame de Chemillé and Dame de Beaupreau (d. 1578), was a French princess and courtier. She was Première dame d'honneur to the queen dowager regent of France, Catherine de' Medici, from 1561 until 1578.

== Life ==
She married marshal de Montejan in her first marriage. Her great wealth as a widow enabled her to marry in to the royal house by a marriage in 1544 to Charles, Prince of La Roche-sur-Yon.

She was described as a personal friend of queen Catherine. In 1561, she was appointed Première dame d'honneur by the regent Catherine in succession to Jacqueline de Longwy, who had died in August of that year. As such, she was the highest ranking woman office holder at court, with responsibility for all the other ladies-in-waiting and the discipline of the household of the queen. In April 1565, a new rule was introduced by which no unmarried nobleman would be allowed to speak with a maid of honour of the queen except in the presence of the queen or "Madame La Princess de Roche-sur-Yon".

In May 1564, Charles Robert de la Marck, count de Maulevrier, made a statement about Isabelle de Limeuil, claiming that she had offered to ally with him to poison their common enemy, Charles, Prince of La Roche-sur-Yon. He claimed that Limeuil felt persecuted by the prince, whom she alleged pressured his wife to control and oppress the ladies-in-waiting: "The said princess, at the behest of the said prince her husband, aside from the pains that she gave to all the maids of the Queen, seemed to have a particular animosity towards her and tried to verify whether she was pregnant, often tormenting her in front of the Queen on this matter and others."

Her position also made her a visible public figure, attending public ceremonies with the queen. She accompanied queen Catherine on the meeting with the queen of Spain in the French-Spanish border in 1565.

Court offices
Preceded by Jacqueline de Longwy	Première dame d'honneur to Catherine de' Medici; 1561–1578	Succeeded by Alphonsine Strozzi
