= Champigny-sur-Veude =

- Commune
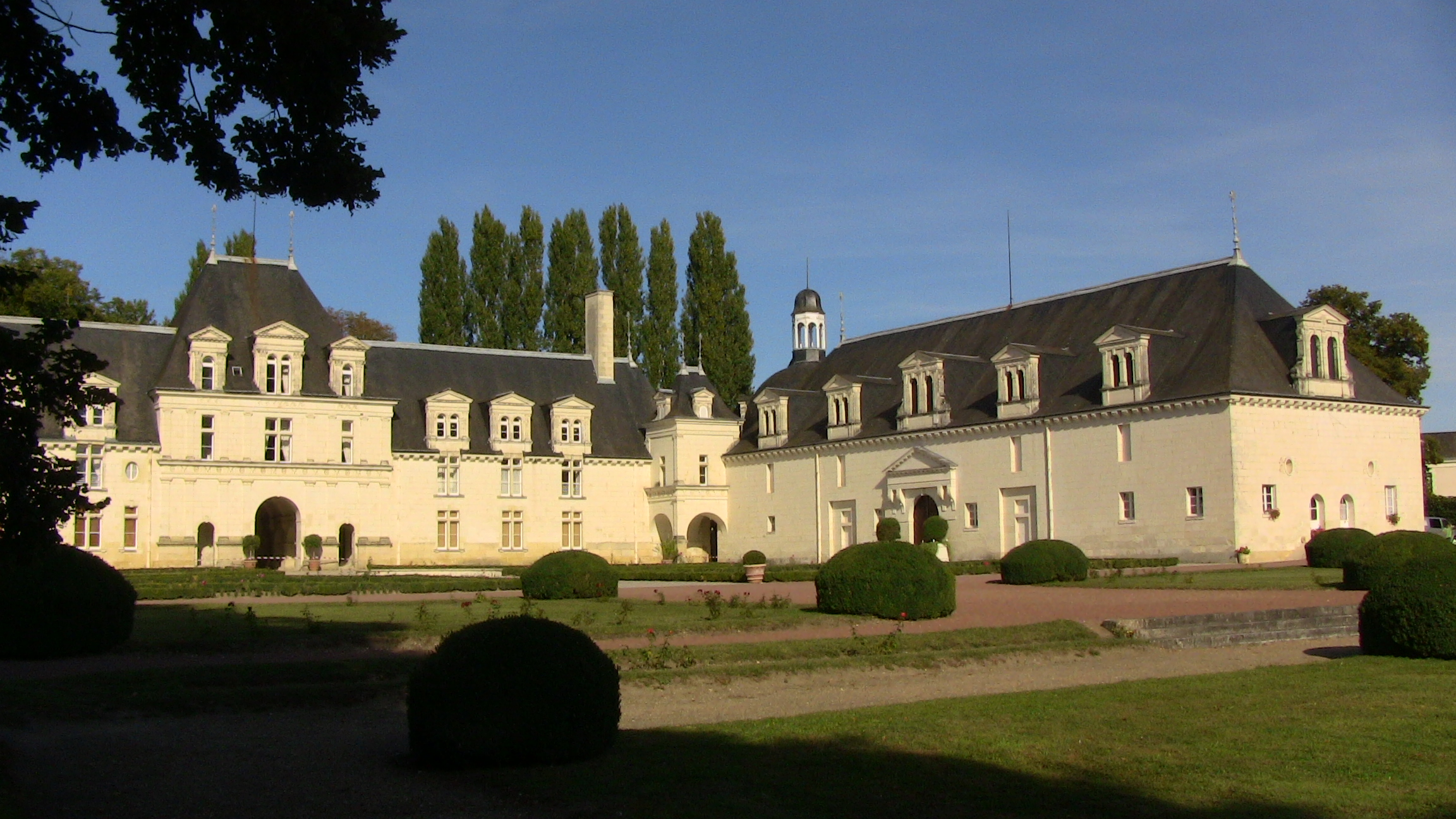
- Chateau

- Coat of arms
- Location of Champigny-sur-Veude
- Location within France Location within Centre-Val de Loire
- Coordinates: 47°04′04″N 0°19′22″E
- Country: France
- Region: Centre-Val de Loire
- Department: Indre-et-Loire
- Arrondissement: Chinon
- Canton: Sainte-Maure-de-Touraine

Government
  - Mayor (2020–2026): Aurélie Rocher
- Area^{1}: 16.18 km^{2} (6.25 sq mi)
- Highest elevation: 107 m (351 ft)
- Lowest elevation: 39 m (128 ft)
- Population (2023): 809
  - Density: 50.0/km^{2} (129/sq mi)
- Time zone: UTC+01:00 (CET)
  - Summer (DST): UTC+02:00 (CEST)
- INSEE/Postal code: 37051 /37120
- ^{1} French Land Register data, which excludes lakes, ponds, glaciers > 1 km^{2} (0.386 sq mi or 247 acres) and river estuaries.

Champigny-sur-Veude (French pronunciation: [ʃɑ̃piɲi syʁ vød]) is a commune in the Indre-et-Loire department in the Centre-Val de Loire region of France. The castle features in Madame de Lafayette's short novel Histoire de la Princesse de Montpensier (1662).

== Population ==
Historical population
Year	Pop.	±% p.a.
1968	782	—
1975	845	+1.11%
1982	950	+1.69%
1990	859	−1.25%
1999	882	+0.29%
2007	864	−0.26%
2012	859	−0.12%
2017	851	−0.19%
2023	809	−0.84%
Source: INSEE

== See also ==
- Communes of the Indre-et-Loire department
