= Château de Bonnétable =

French château

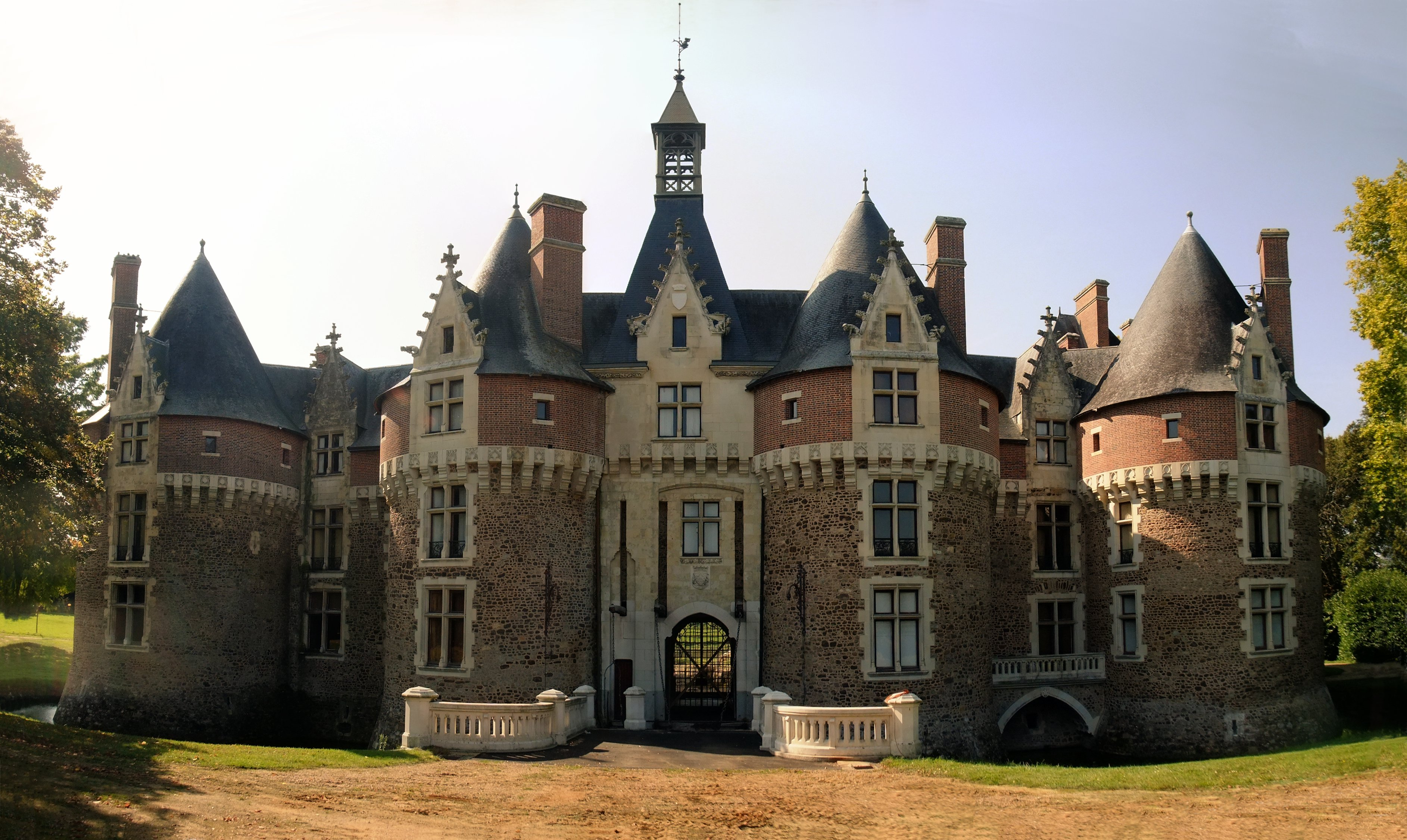
- September 2011
- Interactive map of Château de Bonnétable
- 48°10′35″N 0°25′35″E
- Location: Bonnétable and Briosne-lès-Sables, Sarthe, France

Site notes
- Architectural style: Neo-Gothic Renaissance
- Restored by: Henri Parent

Monument historique
- Designated: 29 November 1991

The Château de Bonnétable is a historic château that is located across the communes of Bonnétable and Briosne-lès-Sables, in the French department of Sarthe in the Pays de la Loire region.

== History ==
A fortified castle has existed in Malétable since at least the 12th century. The Lordship of Malétable belonged to the Rotrou family. While the appearance is unknown, in 1406, a keep with walls and moats surrounded by a thousand-acre forest, on which hunting rights were exercised was mentioned. At the end of the 13th century, the name Malétable changed to Bonnétable.

Occupied by the English from 1420 to 1422, the château was ruined during the Hundred Years' War.

=== Harcourt, Coesmes, Bourbon-Soissons ===
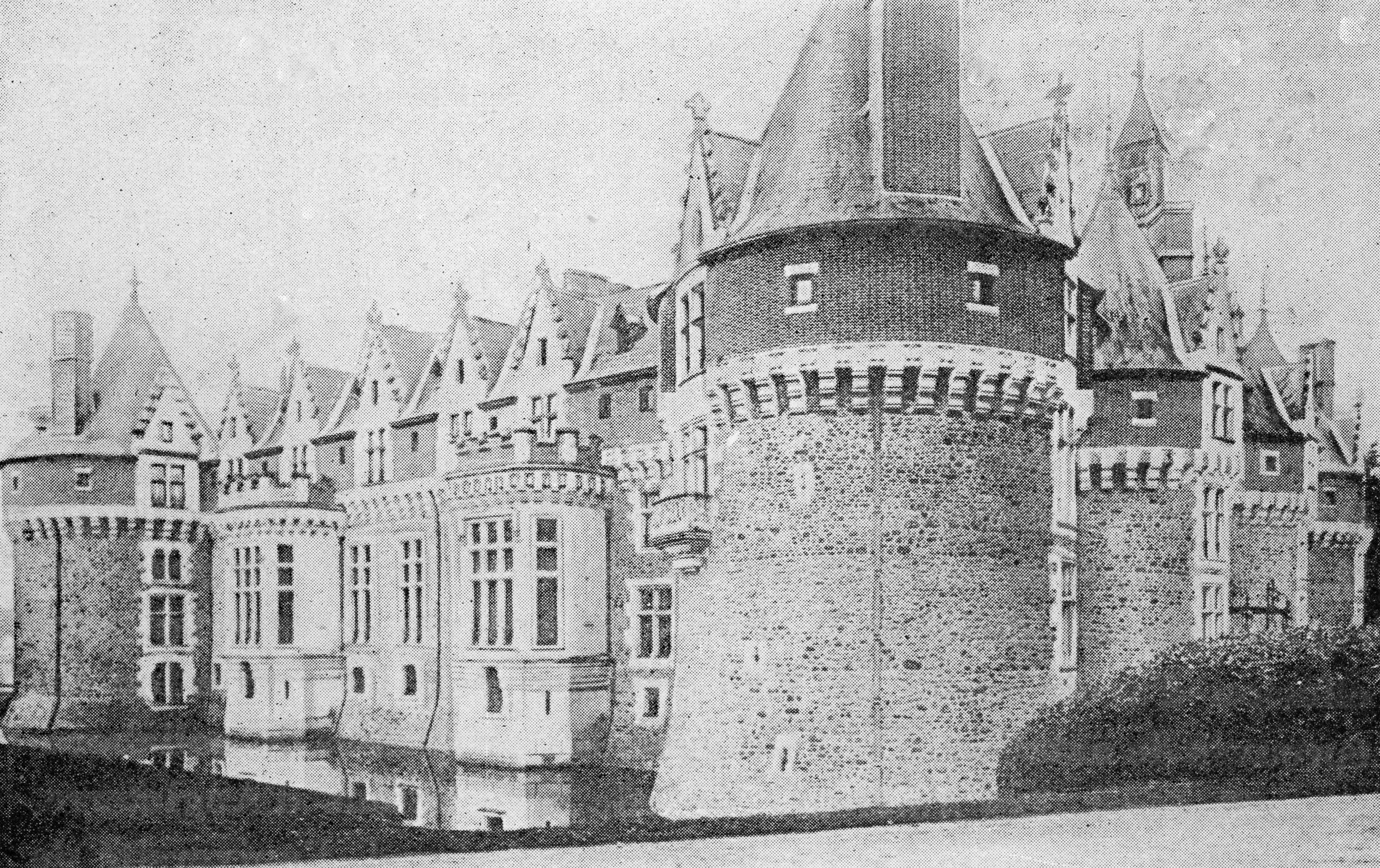
Château de Bonnétable (près Le Mans), in the Bibliothèque nationale de France by Pierre de Coubertin, 1909

In July 1472, King Louis XI authorized Jean d'Harcourt to have his château at Bonnétable reestablished. Construction of the new residence began in 1476 with Mathurin Delandelle as the project manager. When Jean d'Harcourt died in 1487, the unfinished building was completed by his successors.

Bonnétable passed through marriage from the d'Harcourts to the Coesmes, (Note: Jeanne de Coesme, dame de Lucé et de Bonnétable (1555–1601), was the daughter and heiress of Louis de Coesme, Seigneur of Lucé, and Anne de Pisseleu (the niece of Anne de Pisseleu, Duchess of Étampes, the celebrated mistress of Francis I of France. Jeanne was twice married: first to Louis de Montafié, Count of Montafié, Lord of Piedmont, Prince of Carignano, with whom she had Anne de Montafié, and secondly to François de Bourbon, Prince of Conti.) then the Bourbon-Soissons. In 1621, King Louis XIII was received at the Château de Bonnétable by Countess Anne de Montafié (widow of Charles de Bourbon, Count of Soissons). (Note: Charles de Bourbon, Count of Soissons (1566–1612), a first cousin of King Henry IV of France, was the son of the Huguenot leader Louis I de Bourbon, prince de Condé and his second wife, Françoise d'Orléans-Longueville.) In the 18th century, the château passed to Charles Philippe d'Albert, 4th Duke of Luynes through his marriage to Louise-Léontine de Bourbon, a granddaughter of Louis de Bourbon, Count of Soissons), after which it was rarely used and lost its moat.

=== d'Albert de Luynes ===
During the Revolution, the château was the property of Louis Joseph Charles Amable d'Albert de Luynes, 6th Duke of Luynes. After his death in 1807, the Bonnétable estate passed on to his daughter, Pauline Hortense d'Albert de Luynes, the wife of the Minister of Foreign Affairs Mathieu de Montmorency, 1st Duke of Montmorency-Laval. The Duchess of Montmorency died at Bonnétable in 1858.

=== Rochefoucauld-Doudeauville ===
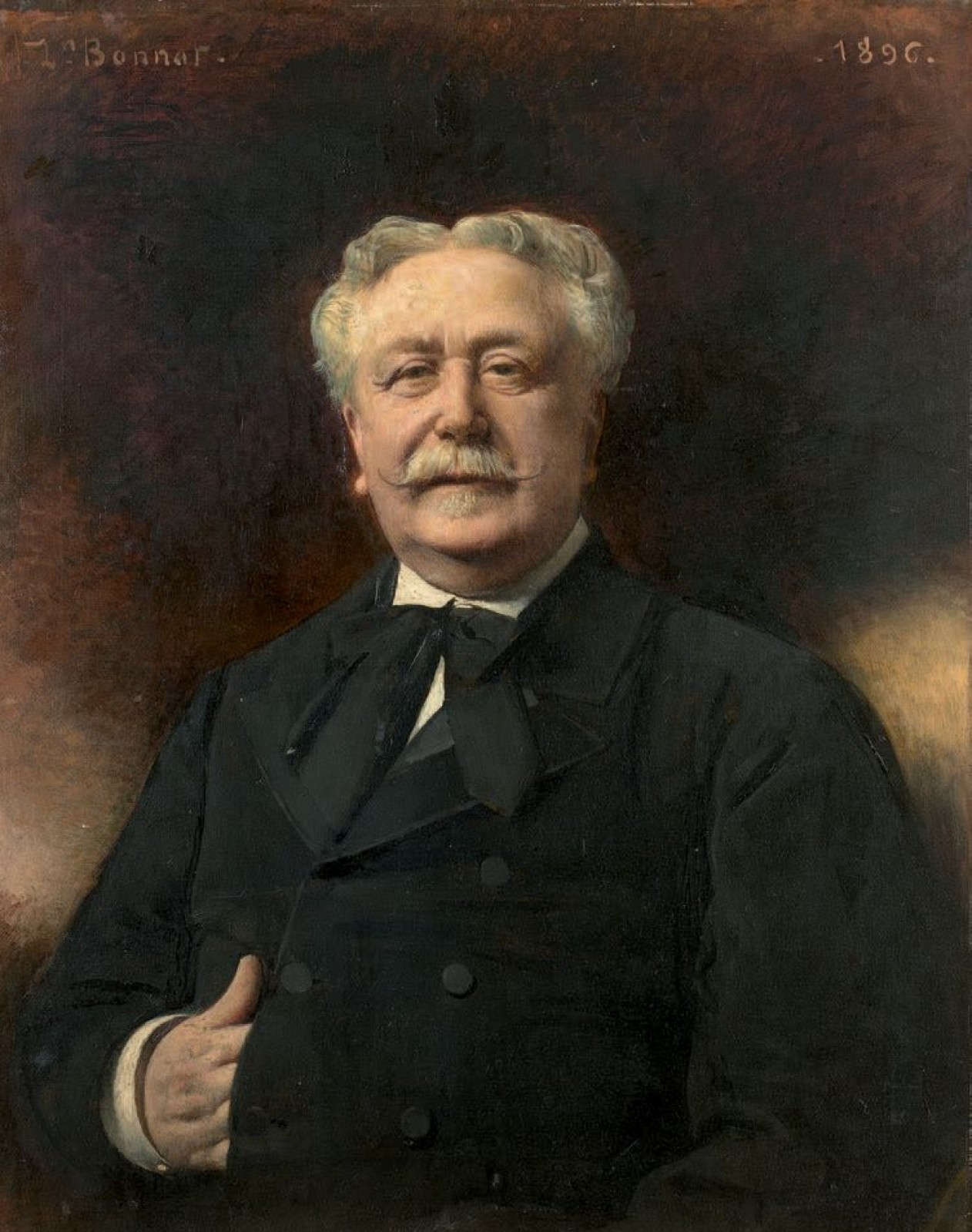
Portrait of Sosthènes II, by Léon Bonnat, 1899

"It is an old manor house with large turrets, thick walls, and rare and narrow windows; sparsely furnished, not decorated, but solid, clean, and where all kinds of necessities are found, from the chaplain to a basin. [...] In the center of a forest, where six roads lead to a crossroads, there is an immense clearing where the Duchess had a pottery factory built, with all the outbuildings, it is almost a village, which occupies sixty -eight people"

— Princess Dorothea of Courland, Duchess of Dino

In c. 1880, the château fell to their grandson, Sosthène II de La Rochefoucauld, 4th Duke of Doudeauville, (a son of Élisabeth-Hélène de Montmorency-Laval and Sosthène I de La Rochefoucauld), and his wife, Princess Marie of Ligne, who commissioned architect Henri Parent to undertake major renovations (as he did for La Rochefoucauld's Château d'Esclimont and Hôtel de La Rochefoucauld-Doudeauville in Paris). The building's façades were redecorated in the neo-Gothic style, by drilling of numerous openings, the addition of turrets, bow windows and stoops. For the interiors, the architect hired artisans and painters from Le Mans who created and installed numerous symbols linking to the La Rochefoucauld family history, particularly Melusine, who was called "protector fairy of the castle". In the dining room, the fireplace surround highlighted the motto of the House of La Rochefoucauld, "It's my pleasure", as well as that of the House of Ligne: "Always straight".

In 1908, the dining room was again redecorated with its walls covered with tapestries from the Beauvais Manufactory, while the chapel adjoining the château, decorated in the "Haute Epoque" style, received eleven religious medallions which evoked the eleven patron saints of each of the children of the Duke and Duchess of Doudeauville. Their descendants owned the Château de Bonnetable until the end of the 20th century.

=== Monument historique ===
The Château de Bonnétable was designated a Monument historique by ministerial decree on 29 November 1991.

== See also ==
- List of castles in France
