= Jeanne de Coesme, dame de Lucé et de Bonnétable =

Jeanne-Françoise de Coëme
- Princess of Conti
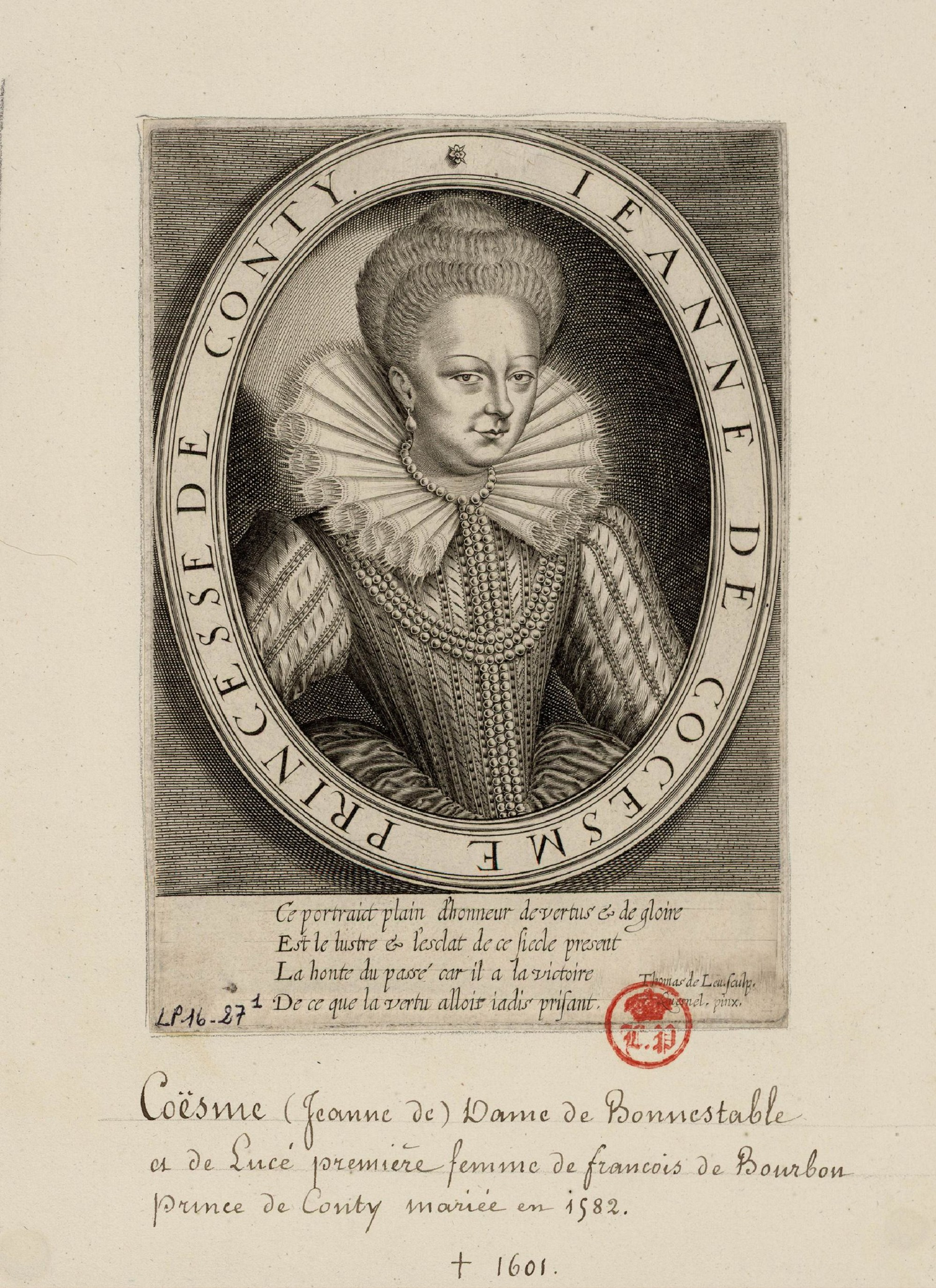
- Born: 1555
- Died: 26 December 1601 (aged 45–46); Chartres, France
- Spouse: Louis de Montafié (m. 1576; died 1577) François de Bourbon, Prince of Conti (m. 1581; died 1601)
- Issue: Urbaine de Montafié; Anne de Montafié
- Father: Louis de Coesme
- Mother: Anne de Pisseleu
- Religion: Roman Catholic

Jeanne de Coësme, Dame de Lucé and de Bonnétable (1555 – 26 December 1601) was a French noblewoman and courtier. She was the daughter of Louis de Coesme and a member of the House of Bourbon. She married François de Bourbon, titled the Prince of Conti. As such, after her marriage she was the Princess of Conti.

== Early life ==
Jeanne was born in 1555. She was the daughter of Louis de Coesme (1532–1563), Seigneur of Lucé, and Anne de Pisseleu (the niece of Anne de Pisseleu, Duchess of Étampes, the mistress of King Francis I).

Her paternal grandparents were Charles III de Coësmes, Baron of Lucé, and Gabrielle d'Harcourt (a daughter of François d'Harcourt, seigneur de Bonnétable and Anne de Saint-Germain). Through her father, Jeanne was the heiress of Bonnétable, a commune in the Sarthe department in the region of Pays de la Loire in north-western France, which included the Château de Bonnétable (built by her paternal grandmother's grandfather, Jean d'Harcourt, in 1476).

== Personal life ==
Her first marriage, in January 1576, was to Louis de Montafié (1550–1577), Count of Montafié, Lord of Piedmont, Prince of Carignano. He was the son of Georges de Montafié and Bianca Orsini. Together they had one son and two daughters, including:

- Urbaine de Montafié (b. 1575), who married Louis de La Châtre, Baron of Maisonfort, a son of Claude de La Châtre and Jeanne de Chabot. After her death, he married Louise d'Étampes de Valençay.
- Anne de Montafié (1577–1644), who married a Prince of the Blood, Charles de Bourbon, Count of Soissons, on 27 December 1601, becoming the Countess of Soissons.

On 6 October 1577, when Anne was less than three months old, Louis was assassinated at Aix-en-Provence while in the service of King Henry III as his lieutenant. Jeanne required the intervention of the King and Pope Pius V to ensure that Anne regained the succession to her father's estate of Bonnétable.

=== Second marriage ===
On 17 December 1581, Jeanne remarried to François de Bourbon, Prince of Conti (1558–1614) at the Palais du Louvre. In 1585, Nicolas de Montreux dedicated the first edition of the first volume of his novel the Bergeries de Julliette to her. The letters written by Jeanne during the 1580s and 1590s provide historians with an insight into the state of affairs in the province of Maine at that period.

Jeanne contracted smallpox while travelling to her estate at Lucé to negotiate Anne's marriage, and died at Saint-Arnoul, near Chartres, the day before Anne's wedding. In this marriage, Anne brought her inheritance of the countship of Montafié in Piedmont as well as her mother's seigneuries of Bonnétable and Lucé to the Bourbons.

After her death, the widowed Prince of Conti married Louise Marguerite of Lorraine (a daughter of Duke Henri of Guise and Catherine of Cleves), in 1605.

=== Descendants ===
Through her daughter Anne, she was posthumously a grandmother of: Louis de Bourbon, Count of Soissons (who had one illegitimate son, Louis Henri, Count of Noyers, by his mistress Élisabeth des Hayes); (Note: Louis Henri de Bourbon-Soissons, Count of Noyers (1640–1703), was the father of Louise-Léontine de Bourbon (1696–1721), married Charles Philippe d'Albert, 4th Duke of Luynes, bringing the Château de Bonnétable into the d'Albert de Luynes family.) Louise de Bourbon, Mademoiselle de Soissons (wife of Henri d'Orléans, Duke of Longueville); Marie de Bourbon, Countess of Soissons (wife of Thomas Francis, Prince of Carignano); and Charlotte Anne de Bourbon and Élisabeth de Bourbon, who both died young.
