= List of consorts of Enghien =

== Lady of Enghien ==
This is a list of the counts of Enghien. In 1394 Enghien goes to John of Luxembourg, Sire of Beauvois, husband of Marguerite d'Enghien. In 1482 Enghien goes to Francis, Count of Vendôme, husband of Marie of Luxembourg and thus the house of Bourbon-Condé.

- –1092 : Engelbert I
- 1092– : Engelbert II, son
- –1190 : Huwes I, son
- 1190–1192 : Engelbert III, son
- 1192–1242 : Engelbert IV, son
- 1242–1256 : Sohier I, son
- 1256–1271 : Walter I, the great, son
- 1271–1310 : Walter II, son
- 1310–1345 : Walter III, son
- 1345–1364 : Sohier II, son
- 1364–1381 : Walter IV, son
- 1381–1394 : Louis, nephew

Picture	Name	Father	Birth	Marriage	Became Consort	Ceased to be Consort	Death	Husband
	Blanche (or Sanchie) of Baux							John of Enghien
	Margaret of Luxembourg	Guy I of Luxembourg, Count of Ligny (Luxembourg)						Peter of Enghien
Picture	Name	Father	Birth	Marriage	Became Consort	Ceased to be Consort	Death	Husband

== Countess of Enghien ==
Picture	Name	Father	Birth	Marriage	Became Countess	Ceased to be Countess	Death	Husband
	Eléanor de Roucy de Roye	Charles de Roye, Count of Roucy (Roye)	24 February 1535	22 June 1551		23 July 1564		Louis de Bourbon
	Françoise d'Orléans-Longueville	François d'Orléans-Longueville, Prince of Chalet-Aillon (Valois-Orléans-Longueville)	5 April 1549	8 November 1565		1566 elevated to Duchess	11 June 1601	Louis de Bourbon
Picture	Name	Father	Birth	Marriage	Became Countess	Ceased to be Countess	Death	Husband

== Duchess of Enghien ==
Also known as the Duchess of Montmorency

Picture	Name	Father	Birth	Marriage	Became Duchess	Ceased to be Duchess	Death	Husband
	Françoise d'Orléans-Longueville	François d'Orléans-Longueville, Prince of Chalet-Aillon (Valois-Orléans-Longueville)	5 April 1549	8 November 1565	1566 elevated from Countess	13 March 1569 husband's death	11 June 1601	Louis de Bourbon, 1st Duke
	Marie de Clèves	Francis I of Cleves, Duke of Nevers (De la Marck)	1553	10 August 1572		14 November 1574		Henry de Bourbon, 2nd Duke
	Charlotte-Catherine de la Tremoille	Louis III de La Trémoille, Duke of Thouars (De la Trémoille)	1568	16 March 1586		5 March 1588 husband's death	28 August 1629	Henry de Bourbon, 2nd Duke
	Charlotte-Marguerite de Montmorency	Henri I de Montmorency (Montmorency)	11 May 1594	17 May 1609		8 September 1621 their son became Duke	2 December 1650	Henry de Bourbon, 3rd Duke
	Claire-Clémence de Maillé-Brézé, Duchess of Fronsac	Urbain de Maillé, Marquis of Brézé	25 February 1628	February 1641		26 December 1646 became Princess of Condé	16 April 1694	Louis de Bourbon, 4th Duke
	Anne Henriette of Bavaria	Edward, Count Palatine of Simmern (Palatinate-Simmern)	13 March 1648	11 December 1663		11 November 1686 became Princess of Condé	23 February 1723	Henri Jules de Bourbon, 5th Duke
	Louise-Françoise de Bourbon, Légitimée de France	Louis XIV of France	1 June 1673	25 May 1685		1 April 1709 became Princess of Condé	16 June 1743	Louis de Bourbon, 6th Duke
	Bathilde d'Orléans	Louis Philippe I, Duke of Orléans (Orléans)	9 July 1750	24 April 1770		2 August 1772 their son became Duke	10 January 1822	Louis Henri de Bourbon, 9th Duke
	Charlotte Louise Dorothée de Rohan	Charles Jules Armand de Rohan (Rohan)	25 October 1767	18 February 1804		21 March 1804 husband's death	1 May 1841	Louis Antoine de Bourbon, 10th Duke
Picture	Name	Father	Birth	Marriage	Became Duchess	Ceased to be Duchess	Death	Husband

== See also ==
- Duchess of Bourbon
- Duchess of Guise
- Princess of Condé
- Duchess of Montmorency
