= François de Bassompierre =

French courtier and Marshal of France (1579–1646)

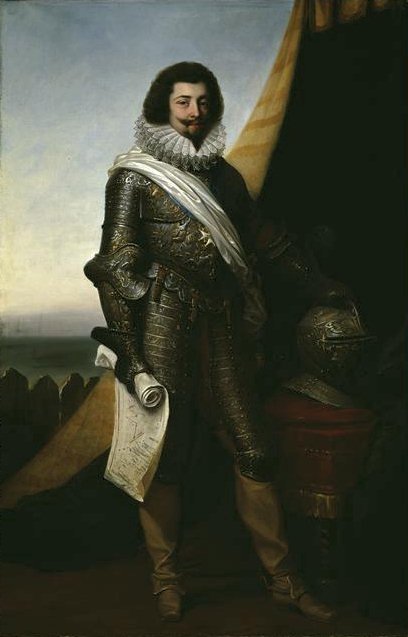
François de Bassompierre

François de Bassompierre (French pronunciation: [fʁɑ̃swa də basɔ̃pjɛʁ]; 12 April 1579 – 12 October 1646) was a French courtier.

The son of Christophe de Bassompierre (1547–1596), he was born at the castle of Haroué in Lorraine. He was descended from an old family which had for generations served the dukes of Burgundy and Lorraine, and after being educated with his brothers in Bavaria and Italy, was introduced to the court of King Henry IV of France in 1598. He became a great favourite of the king and shared to the full in the dissipations of court life. In 1600, he took part in the brief campaign in Savoy, and in 1603 fought in Hungary against the Turks for emperor Rudolf II.

In 1614, he assisted Marie de' Medici, now queen mother, in her struggle against the nobles, but upon her failure in 1617 remained loyal to the young king Louis XIII and assisted the royalists when they routed Marie's supporters at Les Ponts-de-Cé in 1620. His services during the Huguenot rising of 1621–22 won for him the dignity of marshal of France. He was with the army of the king during the siege of La Rochelle in 1628, and in 1629 distinguished himself in the campaign against the Huguenot rebels of Languedoc, especially at the Siege of Privas. In 1615 Bassompierre had purchased from Henri, duc de Rohan, the coveted position of colonel-general of the Swiss and Grisons; on this account he was sent to raise troops in Switzerland when Louis XIII marched against Savoy in 1629, and after a short campaign in Italy his military career ended.

As a diplomat, his career was a failure. In 1621, he went to Madrid as envoy extraordinary to arrange the dispute concerning the seizure of the Valtelline forts by Spain, and signed the fruitless Treaty of Madrid. In 1625, he was sent into Switzerland on an equally futile mission, and in 1626 to London to secure the retention of the Catholic ecclesiastics and attendants of Henrietta Maria, wife of King Charles I of England. The personal influence of Henry IV had deterred Bassompierre from a marriage with Charlotte de Montmorency, daughter of the constable Montmorency, afterwards princesse de Condé, and between 1614 and 1630 he was secretly married to Louise Marguerite of Lorraine, widow of François, prince de Conti, and through her became implicated in the plot to overthrow Richelieu on the "Day of the Dupes" (1630). His share was only a slight one, but his wife was an intimate friend of Marie de' Medici, and her hostility to the cardinal aroused his suspicions. By Richelieu's orders, Bassompierre was arrested at Senlis on 25 February 1631, and put into the Bastille, where he remained until after Richelieu's death in 1643.

On his release his offices were restored to him, and he passed most of his time at the castle of Tillières in Normandy, until his death in 1646 aged 67. He left a son, François de la Tour, by the princesse de Conti (Louise Marguerite de Lorraine), and an illegitimate son, Louis de Bassompierre, afterwards Bishop of Saintes.

His Mémoires, which are an important source for the history of his time, were first published at Cologne in 1665. He also left an incomplete account of his embassies to Spain, Switzerland and England (Cologne, 1668) and a number of discourses upon various subjects.

During his embassy to Charles I of England in 1626, Bassompierre was entertained by the Master of the Ceremonies Sir Lewes Lewkenor, who escorted him to a play, 'Lucnar came to bring me a very rich present from the king, of four diamonds set in a lozenge, and a great stone at the end; and the same evening sent again to fetch me to hear an excellent English play.'

== See also ==
- Chalais conspiracy
