= Anne de Montafié, Countess of Clermont-en-Beauvaisis =

French countess (1577–1644)

Anne de Montafié
- suo jure Countess of Clermont-en-Beauvaisis, Countess of Montafié, and Lady of Lucé and Bonnétable
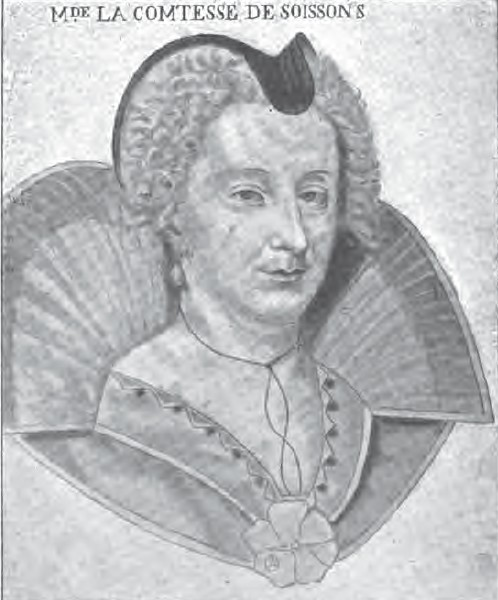
- Born: 21 July 1577; Lucé, France
- Died: 17 June 1644 (aged 66); Hotel de Soissons, Paris, France
- Burial: Gaillon
- Spouse: Charles de Bourbon
- Issue: Louis, Count of Soissons; Louise, Duchess of Longueville; Marie, Countess of Soissons
- Father: Louis de Montafié
- Mother: Jeanne de Coesme
- Religion: Roman Catholic

Anne de Montafié, Countess of Clermont-en-Beauvaisis, (21 July 1577 – 17 June 1644), was a French heiress and the wife of Charles de Bourbon, Count of Soissons, a Prince of the Blood, and military commander during the French Wars of Religion. Following her marriage in 1601, she was styled Countess of Soissons. She was the Countess of Clermont-en-Beauvaisis, Countess of Montafié, Lady of Lucé and Bonnétable in her own right.

== Family ==
Anne was born in Lucé, France, the daughter and co-heiress of Louis de Montafié, Count of Montafié, Lord of Piedmont, Prince of Carignano and Jeanne de Coesme, Dame de Lucé and de Bonnétable, herself the daughter of Louis de Coesme, Seigneur of Lucé and Anne de Pisseleu.

Her paternal grandfather, Georges II, Count of Montafié was a Knight of Malta, and the owner of the Shroud of Turin; and her maternal grandmother was the niece of Anne de Pisseleu, Duchess of Étampes, the celebrated mistress of King Francis I of France.

Anne had one sister, Urbaine who would later marry Louis de La Chatre, Baron of Maisonfort, Marshal of France, by whom she had one daughter, Louise Henriette. On 6 October 1577, when Anne was less than three months old, her father was assassinated at Aix-en-Provence while in the service of King Henry III of France as his lieutenant. Her mother required the intervention of the King and Pope Pius V to ensure that she regained the succession to her father's estate of Bonnétable. Several years later in 1581, her mother married secondly François, Prince of Conti.

== Marriage and issue ==
On 27 December 1601, she married Charles de Bourbon, Count of Soissons, son of Louis de Bourbon, Prince of Condé and Françoise d'Orléans-Longueville, a Prince of the Blood, who was also a military commander during the French Wars of Religion. Anne brought her inheritance of the countship of Montafié in Piedmont as well as her mother's seigneuries of Bonnétable and Lucé to the Bourbons.

Her mother had died near Chartres on the day of Anne's wedding.

Together Charles and Anne had five children, three of whom lived to adulthood:

- Louis de Bourbon, Count of Soissons (1 May 1604- 6 June 1641), died in battle without legitimate issue; he had one illegitimate son, Louis Henri, Count of Noyers by his mistress Élisabeth des Hayes;
- Louise de Bourbon, Mademoiselle de Soissons (11 May 1603- 1637), married Henri d'Orléans, Duke of Longueville, with one surviving daughter, Marie de Nemours.
- Marie de Bourbon, Countess of Soissons (3 May 1606 - 3 June 1692), married Thomas Francis, Prince of Carignano, by whom she had issue
- Charlotte Anne de Bourbon (1608–1623)
- Élisabeth de Bourbon (1610–1611)

Her husband had two illegitimate daughters by his mistress Anne Marie Bohier, with whom he had a relationship before his marriage to Anne.

== Death ==
Anne died on 17 June 1644 at the Hotel de Soissons in Paris, shortly before her 67th birthday. She was buried alongside her husband and children in the Soissons family tomb in the charterhouse of Gaillon.

Her only son, Louis had been killed in battle three years earlier without having had legitimate issue; therefore, the countship of Soissons passed suo jure to her youngest surviving daughter, Marie, wife of the Prince of Carignano. The present House of Savoy are direct descendants of Anne through her daughter Marie, Princess of Carignano.

== Sources ==
- Pére Anselm, Histoire des Rois de France
- Europäische Stammtafeln
