= Louise Marguerite of Lorraine =

- Princess of Conti
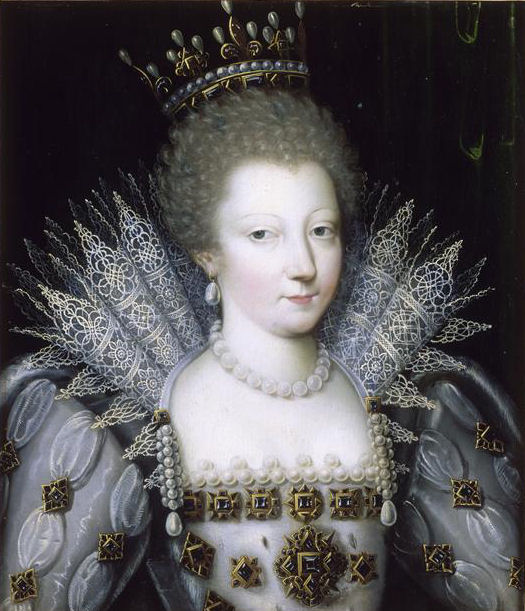
- Anonymous painting
- Born: 1588; Château de Blois, France
- Died: 30 April 1631 (aged 42–43); Château d'Eu, France
- Burial: Collegiale Notre Dame et Saint Laurent, Eu, France
- Spouse: François de Bourbon; François de Bassompierre
Names
- Louise Marguerite de Lorraine
- Father: Henri of Lorraine
- Mother: Catherine of Cleves

Louise Marguerite of Lorraine, Princess of Conti (1588 – 30 April 1631) was a daughter of the Duke of Guise and a member of the House of Lorraine-Guise. She married François de Bourbon, titled the Prince of Conti. As such, after her marriage she was the Princess of Conti. She died without any surviving issue.

== Biography ==
Louise Marguerite was born at the Château de Blois, present at Blois outside Paris. Her father was Henri of Lorraine, Duke of Guise, member of the House of Lorraine and her mother was Catherine of Cleves. She was the penultimate child of fourteen; her brother Claude, Duke of Chevreuse was the husband of Marie de Rohan, the infamous Frondeur. Her oldest brother Charles was the last Duke of Guise after the death of her father in 1588.

She was a member of the house of Guise, a cadet branch of the house of Lorraine which was the ruling family of the Duchy of Lorraine and Bar. As a Lorraine, she was a Foreign Princess at the French court.

She was named after her two godmothers; Louise in honour of Louise of Lorraine, wife of Henry III of France and Marguerite in honour of Marguerite de Valois, first wife of Henry IV. She grew up in the care of her mother and paternal grandmother, Anna d'Este.

Louise Marguerite was often considered to be a great beauty at court. It had been said that Henry IV, the instigator of the marriage, had wanted to marry her himself but this is unlikely as when she came to court, Henry IV was already in love with Gabrielle d'Estrées and thus is widely disputed.

Her husband to be was François de Bourbon, styled the Prince of Conti. He was a son of Louis de Bourbon, Prince of Condé and his wife Eléanor de Roucy de Roye. François was a widower having lost his first wife Jeanne de Coësmes in 1601; that marriage remained childless despite the union being for twenty years.

The couple were married at the Château de Meudon outside Paris on 24 July 1605 and had been used to tie together the House of Lorraine with that of the ruling House of Bourbon.

On 8 May 1610, the Princess of Conti gave birth to a daughter, baptised Marie, at the Palais du Louvre. This child was to be the only infant born to the couple but the girl died of twelve days after birth; the child was buried at the church of Saint-Germain-des-Prés.

The death of François' on 2 August 1614 was Louise Marguerite became a widow at the age of 26. With great zeal, she became devoted to the study of literature as well as a patron of many writers of her time, including François de Malherbe, Nicolas Renouard and Blaise de Vigenère.

She was a lady-in-waiting to Marie de' Medici as well as Anne of Austria.

She later married François de Bassompierre in a secret ceremony. The couple are said to have had a child from their union but little information exists. Having married Bassompierre, they lived together in disgrace, Louise Marguerite dying at the Château d'Eu.

She was buried at the Collegiale Notre Dame et Saint Laurent, at Eu, France.

She is credited as the author of a fictionalized account of the love life of Henry IV's court, reworked and published under various titles including Romant royal (1621), Advantures de la cour de Perse (1629), and Histoire des amours du grand Alcandre (1651).

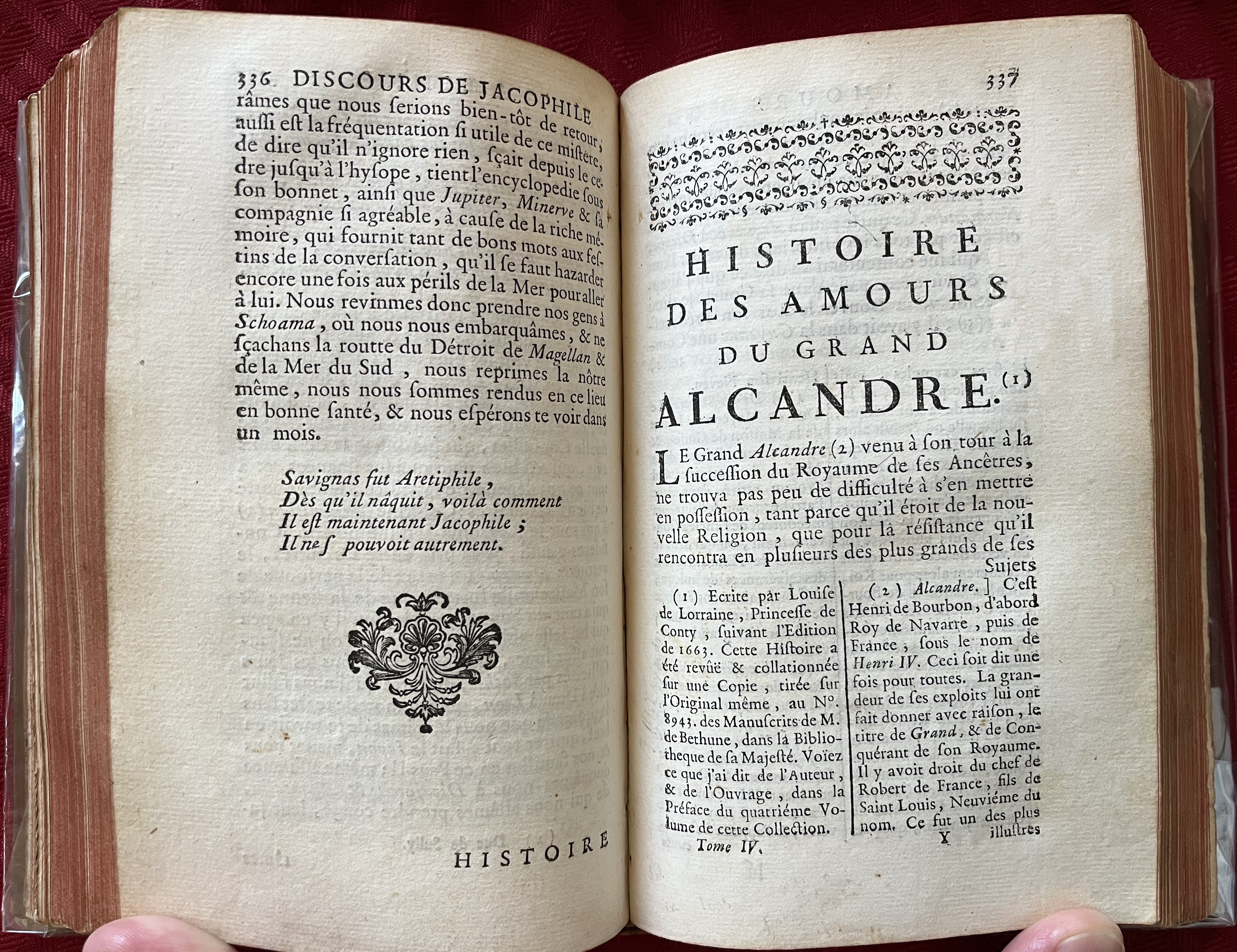
Histoire des amours du Grand Alcandre

== Issue ==
- Marie de Bourbon (8 March 1610 – 20 March 1610) died in infancy.

== Ancestry ==
Ancestors of Louise Marguerite of Lorraine

8. Claude of Lorraine, Duke of Guise
4. Francis of Lorraine, Duke of Guise
9. Antoinette de Bourbon
2. Henri of Lorraine, Duke of Guise
10. Ercole II d'Este, Duke of Ferrara
5. Anna d'Este
11. Princess Renée of France
1. Louise Marguerite of Lorraine
12. Charles de Cleves, Count of Nevers
6. François of Clèves, Duke of Nevers
13. Marie d'Albret, Countess of Rethel
3. Catherine of Cleves
14. Charles de Bourbon, Duke of Vendôme
7. Marguerite de Bourbon
15. Françoise d'Alençon

== See also ==
- Chalais conspiracy

== Bibliography and sources ==
- DeJean, Joan E. (1991). Tender Geographies: Women and the Origins of the Novel in France. Columbia University Press.
- Spangler, Jonathan (2016). The Society of Princes: The Lorraine-Guise and the Conservation of Power and Wealth in Seventeenth-Century France. Routledge.
- Jean Baptiste Joseph Boulliot, Biographie ardennaise. Ou Histoire des Ardennais qui se sont fait remarquer par leurs écrits, leurs actions, leurs vertus ou leurs erreurs. Volume 2. Paris 1830, S. 147–149 (PDF; 21,8 MB).
- Hilarion de Coste, Les Éloges et les vies des reynes, des princesses, et des dames illustres en pieté, en courage & en doctrine, qui ont fleury de nostre temps, & du temps de nos peres. Volume 1. Cramoisy, Parigi 1647.
- Jean Chrétien Ferdinand Hoefer, Nouvelle biographie générale depuis les temps les plus reculés jusqu'à nos jours, avec les renseignements bibliographiques et l'indication des sources à consulter. Volume 11. Firmin Didot, Parigi 1856, S. 663 – 665 (PDF; 94,9 MB).
