= Mademoiselle de Longueville =

Mademoiselle de Longueville was the name prior to marriage of the following:

- Françoise d'Orléans-Longueville (1549–1601), second wife of Louis de Bourbon, Prince of Condé
- Marie de Nemours (1625–1707), Duchess of Nemours and Princess of Neuchâtel
