= Princess of Condé =

The title Princess of Condé refers to the wife of the Prince of Condé, a noble title in France. The House of Condé is a cadet branch of the House of Bourbon, which played a significant role in French history.

== Princess of Condé ==
Picture	Name	Father	Birth	Marriage	Became Princess	Ceased to be Princess	Death	Husband
	Eléanor de Roucy de Roye	Charles, Count of Roucy (Roye)	24 February 1535	22 June 1551		23 July 1564		Louis de Bourbon
	Françoise d'Orléans-Longueville	François, Marquis of Rothelin (Valois)	5 April 1549	8 November 1565		13 March 1569 husband's death	11 June 1601	Louis de Bourbon
	Marie de Clèves	Francis I, Duke of Nevers (La Marck)	1553	10 August 1572		14 November 1574		Henri
	Charlotte Catherine de La Trémoille	Louis, Duke of Thouars (La Trémoille)	1568	16 March 1586		5 March 1588 husband's death	28 August 1629	Henri
	Charlotte Marguerite de Montmorency	Henri, Duke of Montmorency (Montmorency)	11 May 1594	17 May 1609		26 December 1646 husband's death	2 December 1650	Henri
	Claire Clémence de Maillé	Urbain de Maillé-Brézé (Maillé)	25 February 1628	February 1641	26 December 1646 husband's accession	11 November 1686 husband's death	16 April 1694	Louis, Le Grand Condé
	Anne Henriette of Bavaria	Edward, Count Palatine of Simmern (Palatinate-Simmern)	13 March 1648	11 December 1663	11 November 1686 husband's accession	1 April 1709 husband's death	23 February 1723	Henri Jules
	Louise Françoise de Bourbon, Légitimée de France	Louis XIV of France (illegitimate) (Bourbon)	1 June 1673	25 May 1685	1 April 1709 husband's accession	4 March 1710 husband's death	16 June 1743	Louis
	Marie Anne de Bourbon	François Louis, Prince of Conti (Bourbon)	18 April 1689	9 August 1713		21 March 1720		Louis Henri
	Landgravine Caroline of Hesse-Rotenburg	Ernest Leopold, Landgrave of Hesse-Rotenburg (Hesse-Rotenburg)	18 August 1714	24 July 1728		27 January 1740 husband's death	14 June 1741	Louis Henri
	Charlotte de Rohan	Charles, Prince of Soubise (Rohan)	7 October 1737	3 May 1753		4 March 1760		Louis Joseph
	Maria Caterina Brignole	Giuseppe Brignole-Sale, Marquess of Groppoli (Brignole-Sale)	7 October 1737	24 October 1798		18 March 1813		Louis Joseph
	Bathilde d'Orléans	Louis Philippe, Duke of Orléans (Orléans)	9 July 1750	24 April 1770	13 May 1818 husband's accession	10 January 1822		Louis Henri Joseph

== See also ==
- Duchess of Bourbon
- Duchess of Guise
- Duchess of Enghien
- Duchess of Montmorency
