= Treaty of Madrid (1621) =

1621 treaty between France and Spain

The Treaty of Madrid was signed on 26 April 1621 by French courtier, François de Bassompierre. Based on the terms of the treaty, the Valtelline was restored to the Grisons and the Spanish were allowed to reoccupy Chiavenna. Moreover, the accord guaranteed religious amnesty to the Protestants in Valtelline and allowed them to practice their faith freely. The guarantors of this treaty were the King of France, Louis XIII, and the Swiss Confederation. By the Treaty of Madrid, the Spanish government agreed to restore Grisons sovereignty over the Val Tellina and do not use passes rather than add an Italian front to its wars in the Low Countries and Germany

== See also ==
- List of treaties
