= Louise de Bourbon =

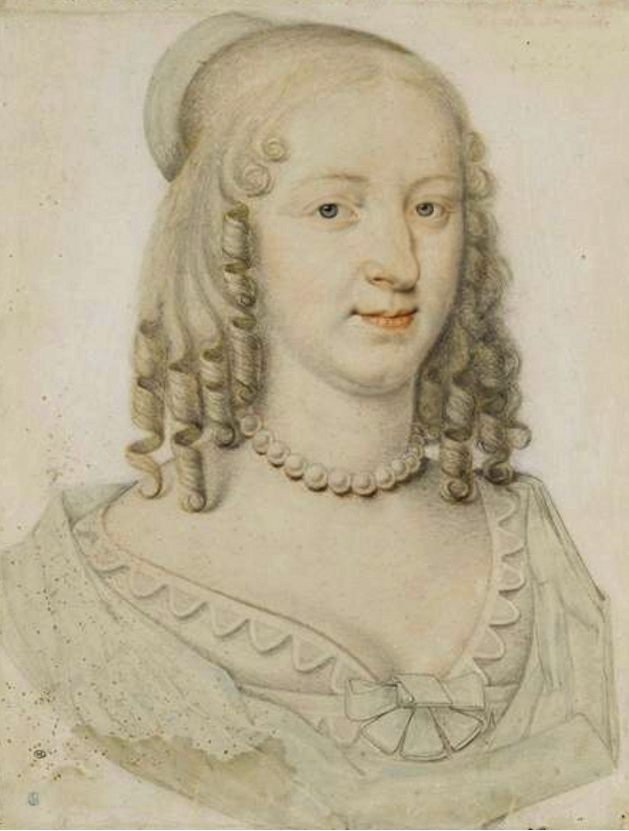

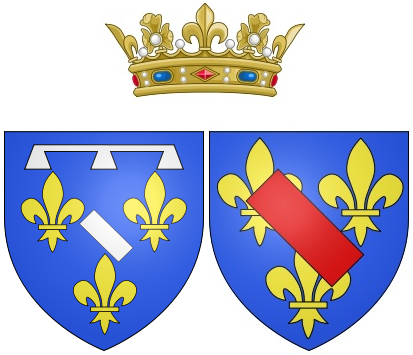
Coat of arms of Louise de Bourbon as Duchess of Longueville

Louise de Bourbon (2 February 1603 – 9 September 1637) called Mademoiselle de Soissons was the wife of Henri d'Orléans, Duke of Longueville.

== Life ==
Louise was the daughter of Charles de Bourbon, Count of Soissons and Anne de Montafié. she was the older sister of the Princess of Carignano as well as the last Count of Soissons. Brought up at the Abbey of Fontevraud, she was placed in the care of her great-aunt Éléonore de Bourbon, one time Princess of Orange.

Louise married Henri II d'Orléans, Duke of Longueville in Paris on 10 April 1617. The couple eventually had three children, but only their daughter Marie survived to adulthood. Dying in 1637, her husband married once more, another princess of the blood in the form of Anne Geneviève de Bourbon.

== Children ==
1. Marie (1625–1707) married Henri II, Duke of Nemours.
2. Louise (1626-1628).
3. X (1634-1634).

== Sources ==
- Pitts, Vincent Joseph (2000). La Grande Mademoiselle at the Court of France, 1627-1693. Johns Hopkins University Press. ISBN 9780801864667.
