= Charles, Count of Soissons =

Charles de Bourbon
- Count of Soissons
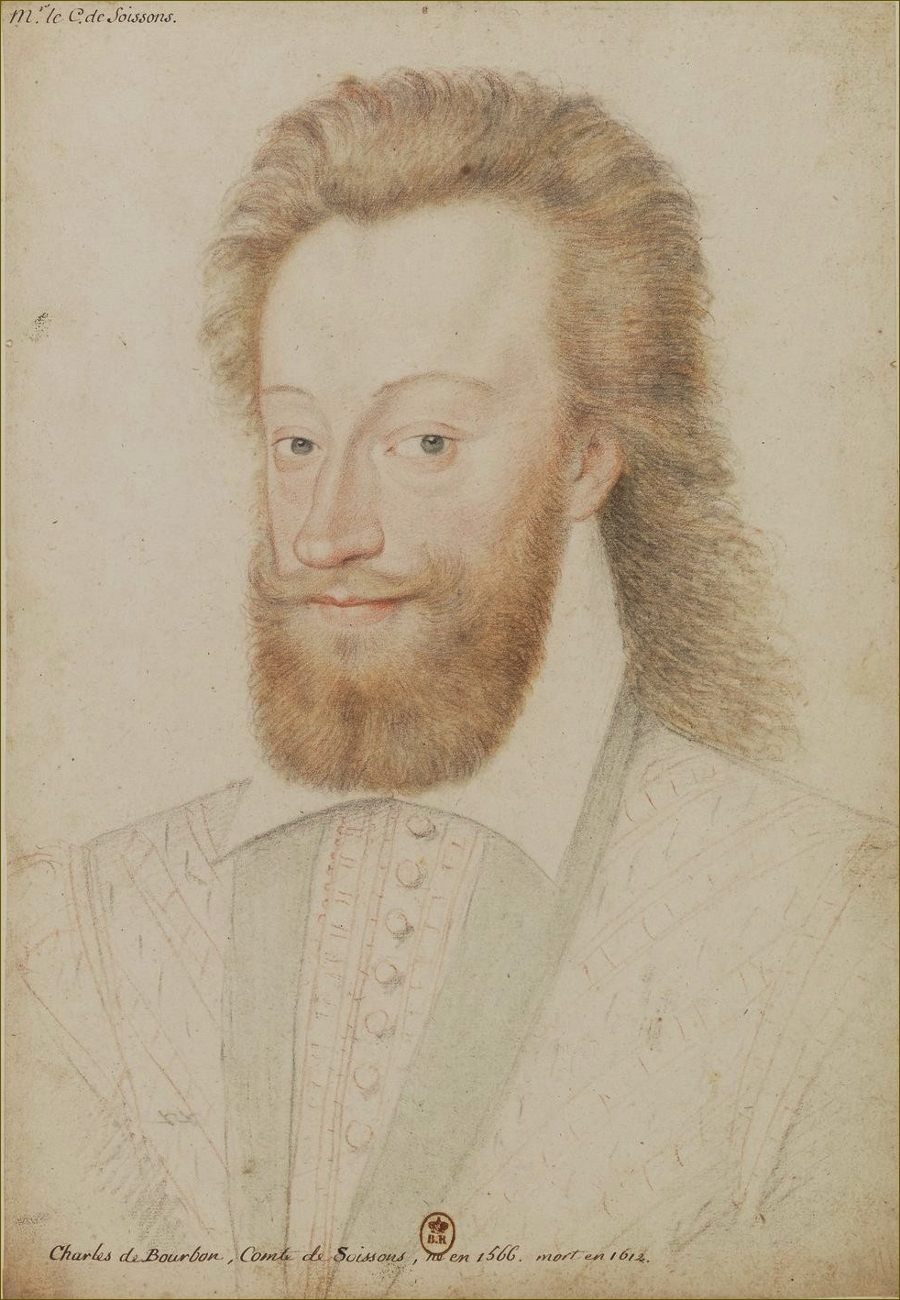
- Born: 3 November 1566; Nogent-le-Rotrou
- Died: 1 November 1612 (aged 45); Château de Blandy-les-Tours
- Spouse: Anne de Montafié
- Issue: Louis, Count of Soissons; Louise, Duchess of Longueville; Marie, Princess of Carignan
- House: Bourbon-Condé
- Father: Louis, Prince of Condé
- Mother: Françoise d'Orléans

Charles de Bourbon (3 November 1566 – 1 November 1612) was a French prince du sang and military commander during the struggles over religion and the throne in late 16th century France. He gave his name to the Hôtel de Soissons after his title Count of Soissons.

== Career ==
Coat-of-arms for Charles, Count of Soissons.

Born in Nogent-le-Rotrou, Charles was the son of the Huguenot leader Louis I de Bourbon, prince de Condé and his second wife, Françoise d'Orléans-Longueville (5 April 1549 – 1601). He was inducted into the Order of the Holy Spirit in 1585 by King Henry III of France. Charles joined the Catholic League during the French Wars of Religion despite his older half-brothers' Protestant affiliations. He left the royal court disenchanted soon thereafter however, and was won over to the cause of Henry of Navarre.

Charles fought for Henry at the battle of Coutras in 1587, was then introduced and secretly engaged to Henry's sister Catherine. He attended the Estates General at Blois in 1588, fought back the League's forces at the battle of Saint Symphorien in 1589, was taken prisoner at Château-Giron and, escaping from Nantes, joined forces with King Henry IV at Dieppe. Henry IV made him Grand mâitre of the royal household and governor of the province of Brittany in 1589.

After the battle of Ivry, Charles led the king's cavalry in besieging Paris in 1590, and proved his worth at the sieges of Chartres in 1591 and of Rouen in 1592. Although he briefly joined in the scheme of his brother Charles, Cardinal de Bourbon, to form a third party in the kingdom, he attended Henry's coronation in 1594, and fought loyally at the successful siege of Laon. Peace having been concluded with Spain, Charles commanded troops in the war in Savoy in 1600.

In 1602 he was made governor of the Dauphiné, and of Normandy in 1610, in which year he was also present at the coronation of Louis XIII. After Henry's death later that year, Soissons opposed the policies of his widow, the queen regent Marie de' Medici. In 1612 Samuel de Champlain convinced Charles to obtain the office of Lieutenant-General from King Louis XIII, which he did.

After the Bourbons obtained the French crown and the Princes de Condé and their heirs apparent (by right of their rank as premier princes du sang) became known, respectively, as Monsieur le prince and Monsieur le duc, Charles came to be styled Monsieur le comte at court. That honorific was borne also by his son Louis and, subsequently, by the Savoy counts of Soissons who inherited the countship from Charles's daughter, Marie, princesse de Carignan, even though they ranked as princes étrangers in France rather than as princes du sang.

The death of Henry IV in 1610 weakened Samuel de Champlain's chances of successfully colonizing New France, and, by the advice of Pierre Dugua, Sieur de Mons, he sought a protector in the person of the Charles, who accepted the proposal to become the “father of New France,” obtained from the queen regent the authority necessary to preserve and advance all that had been already done, and appointed Champlain his lieutenant with unrestricted power. On 8 October 1612, Charles was given the commission, by King Louis XIII, “governor of New France”, but died 12 November 1612.

Charles died at Blandy, possibly of smallpox, and was buried in the Soissons' family tomb in the charterhouse of Gaillon, where his wife and son would also be buried (The Chartreuse de Bourbon-lèz-Gaillon, built in 1562 one km from the Château de Gaillon by Charles, Cardinal de Bourbon, who was buried there, was sold during the French Revolution and demolished in 1834).

== Family ==
As the youngest son of a cadet branch of the royal dynasty, Louis could not expect a large patrimony, but was allotted the countship of Soissons from among the Bourbon estates inherited from his paternal great-grandmother, Marie de Luxembourg. He also obtained the countship of Dreux and the seigneuries of Châtel-Chinon, Noyers, Baugé, and Blandy. In 1601 Charles wed Anne de Montafié (1577–1644) who, although not of royal blood, brought to the Bourbon-Soissons her father's countship of Montafié in Piedmont, as well as her mother's seigneuries of Bonnétable and Lucé. Of their five children, three survived childhood:

- Louis de Bourbon 1604-1641, had illegitimate issue.
- Louise de Bourbon 1603-1637, married Henri II d'Orléans, Duke of Longueville
- Marie de Bourbon 1606-1692, married Thomas Francis, Prince of Carignano
- Charlotte Anne de Borbon (b. 15 June 1608, d. 1 November 1623) died aged 15, never married or had children.
- Elisabeth de Bourbon (b. 16 October 1610, d. 10 October 1611), died in infancy.

Charles's illegitimate daughters by Anne Marie Bohier, daughter of Antoine, seigneur de la Rochebourdet:

- Charlotte, bâtarde de Soissons (d.1626), became abbess of Fontevrault
- Catherine, bâtarde de Soissons (d.1651), became abbess of Perrigne in Maine

== Sources ==
- de Champlain, Samuel (2010). Heidenreich, Conrad E.; Ritch, K. Janet (eds.). Samuel de Champlain Before 1604: Des Sauvages and Other Documents Related to. McGill-Queen's University Press.
- Couchman, Jane (2006). "Resisting Henri IV: Catherine de Bourbon and her Brother". In Miller, Naomi J.; Yavneh, Naomi (eds.). Sibling Relations and Gender in the Early Modern World: Sisters, Brothers. Ashgate Publishing.
- Fischer, David Hackett (2009). Champlain's Dream. Knopf Canada.
- Cohn, Samuel Kline, ed. (2004). Popular Protest in Late-Medieval Europe: Italy, France and Flanders. Manchester University Press. ISBN 9780719067303.
- Love, Ronald S. (2001). Blood and Religion. McGill's Queens University Press.
- May, Steven W.; Bryson, Alan (2016). Verse Libel in Renaissance England and Scotland. Oxford University Press.
- Pitts, Vincent Joseph (2000). La Grande Mademoiselle at the Court of France: 1627-1693. The Johns Hopkins University Press.
- Spanheim, Ézéchiel (1973). Emile Bourgeois (ed.). Relation de la Cour de France. le Temps retrouvé (in French). Paris: Mercure de France. pp. 323, 107–108.
- Pitts, Vincent J. (2009). Henri IV of France: His Reign and Age. Johns Hopkins University Press. ISBN 9780801890277.
- Vrignault, Henri (1965). Légitimés de France de la maison de Bourbon de 1594 à 1820 (in French). chez l'auteur.

Government offices
Preceded by Pierre Dugua, Sieur de Monts	Lieutenant General of New France; 1611–1612	Succeeded by Henry II de Bourbon, prince de Condé
