= Briosne-lès-Sables =

- Commune
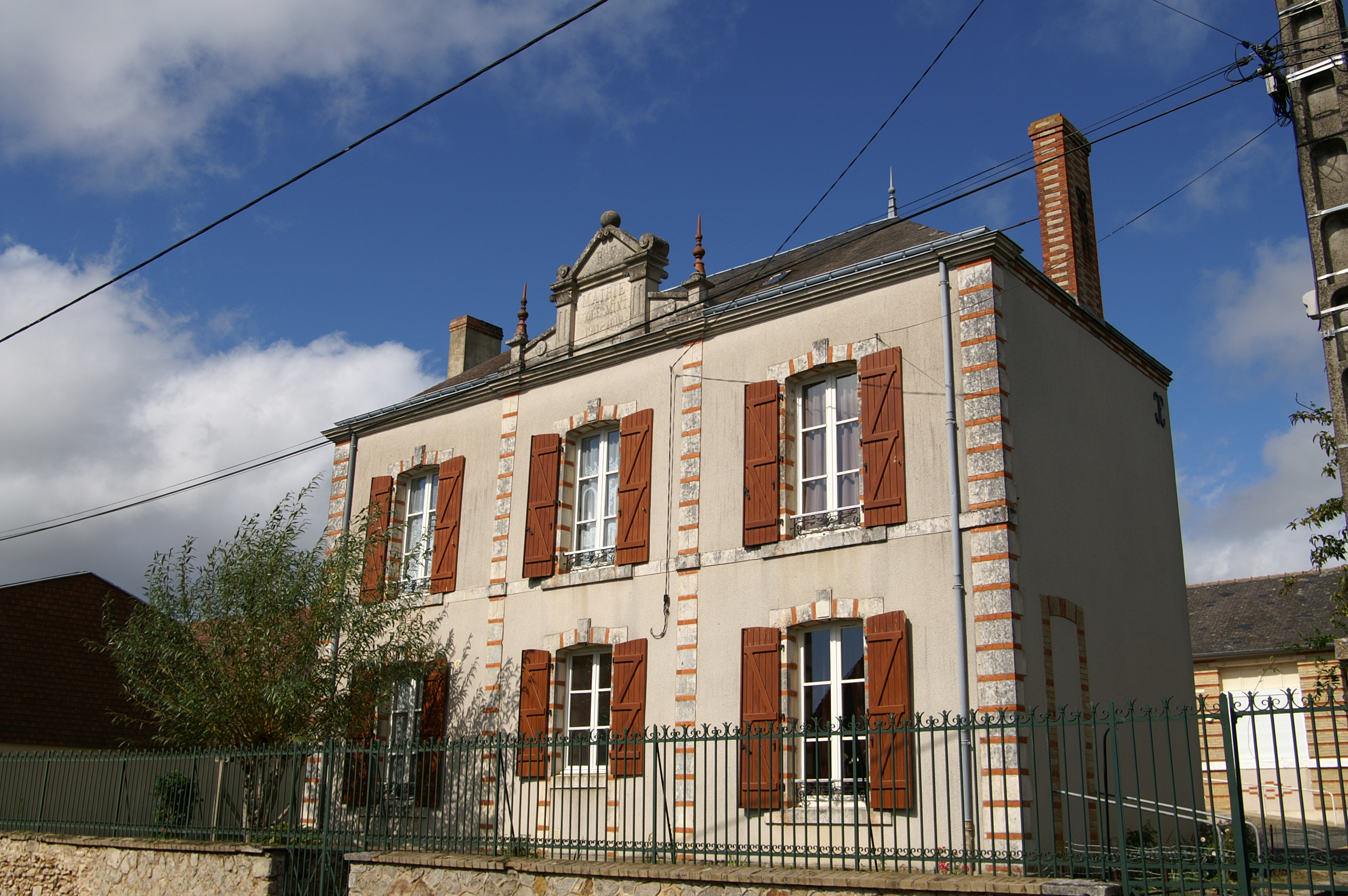
- Town hall
- Location of Briosne-lès-Sables
- Location within France Location within Pays de la Loire
- Coordinates: 48°10′30″N 0°23′42″E
- Country: France
- Region: Pays de la Loire
- Department: Sarthe
- Arrondissement: Mamers
- Canton: Bonnétable
- Intercommunality: Maine Saosnois

Government
  - Mayor (2020–2026): Laurent Bothereau
- Area^{1}: 9.85 km^{2} (3.80 sq mi)
- Population (2023): 558
  - Density: 56.6/km^{2} (147/sq mi)
- Demonym(s): Briosnais, Briosnaise
- Time zone: UTC+01:00 (CET)
  - Summer (DST): UTC+02:00 (CEST)
- INSEE/Postal code: 72048 /72110
- ^{1} French Land Register data, which excludes lakes, ponds, glaciers > 1 km^{2} (0.386 sq mi or 247 acres) and river estuaries.

Briosne-lès-Sables (French pronunciation: [bʁijɔn lɛ sabl]) is a commune in the Sarthe department in the region of Pays de la Loire in north-western France.

== See also ==
- Communes of the Sarthe department
