= François de Bourbon, Prince of Conti =

François de Bourbon
- Prince of Conti
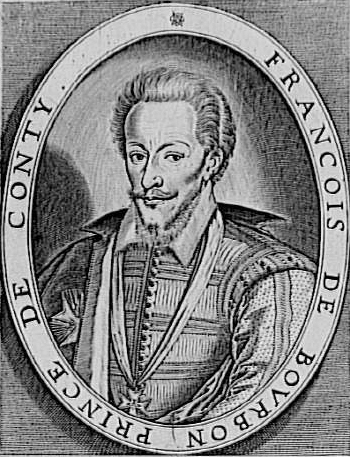
- Born: 19 August 1558; La Ferté-sous-Jouarre, Province of Champagne, France
- Died: 3 August 1614 (aged 55); Paris, France
- Spouse: Jeanne de Coesme; Louise Marguerite of Lorraine
- Issue: Marie de Bourbon
- House: Bourbon-Condé
- Father: Louis de Bourbon, Prince of Condé
- Mother: Eléanor de Roucy de Roye

François de Bourbon, Prince of Conti (19 August 1558 – 3 August 1614), was the Marquis of Conti and between 1581 and 1597 was elevated to the rank of a prince. The title of Prince of Conti was honorary and did not carry any territorial jurisdiction. He was not involved in the French Wars of Religion until he declared himself against the Catholic League and pledged his support for Henry of Navarre, later Henry IV of France. Following the death of Henry III of France, François was one of the two princes of the blood to recognize Henry IV, despite being a possible heir to the throne. He died on 3 August 1614.

== Biography ==
François was the third son of Louis de Bourbon, Prince of Condé, and Eléanor de Roucy de Roye. He born in La Ferté-sous-Jouarre, in the Province of Champagne and was a member of a junior line of the House of Bourbon, his first cousin being the future Henry IV of France. His mother died in 1564, while his father remarried Françoise d'Orléans, Mademoiselle de Longueville in 1565.

Coat-of-arms for François de Bourbon, Prince of Conti.

François, who belonged to the Catholic faith, (Note: Bram van Leuveren states that François was a Huguenot.) appears to have taken no part in the French Wars of Religion until 1587, when his distrust of Henry of Lorraine, Duke of Guise caused him to declare against the Catholic League and to support his cousin Henry of Navarre, afterwards King Henry IV.

In 1589 after the murder of Henry III of France he was one of the two princes of the blood who signed the declaration recognising Henry IV as king, and continued to support him even though he himself was mentioned as a candidate for the throne upon the death of Charles, Cardinal de Bourbon in 1590.

François's first wife was Jeanne de Coesme, heiress of Bonnétable. The couple were married at the Palais du Louvre on 17 December 1581, Jeanne died in 1601 having had no children. On 24 July 1605 he married Louise Marguerite of Lorraine (1588–1631), daughter of Duke Henri of Guise and Catherine of Cleves, who was desired by Henry IV. The couple were married at the Château de Meudon. François died in 1614 and the title of Prince of Conti lapsed following his death in 1614, as his only child, Marie, predeceased him in 1610. She was only three weeks old.

== Issue ==
François and Louise had:

- Marie de Bourbon (8 March 1610 – 20 March 1610) died in infancy.

François also had an illegitimate son;

- Nicolas de Conti (d. 1648), abbot of Gramont

== Sources ==
- Broomhall, Susan (2021). The Identities of Catherine de' Medici. Brill. ISBN 978-90-04-36082-2.157
- Knecht, R.J. (1989). The French Wars of Religion, 1559-1598. Longman.
- Pitts, Vincent J. (2009). Henri IV of France: His Reign and Age. The Johns Hopkins University Press.
- Spangler, Jonathan (2016). The Society of Princes: The Lorraine-Guise and the Conservation of Power and Wealth in Seventeenth-Century France. Routledge.
- van Leuveren, Bram (2023). Early Modern Diplomacy and French Festival Culture in a European Context, 1572-1615. Brill. ISBN 9789004537811.

François de Bourbon, Prince of Conti House of Bourbon Born: 1558 Died: 1614
French royalty
Preceded by New creation	Prince of Conti; 1581–1614	Succeeded by Armand de Bourbon, prince de Conti
