= Battle of Jarnac =

1569 battle in the French Wars of Religion

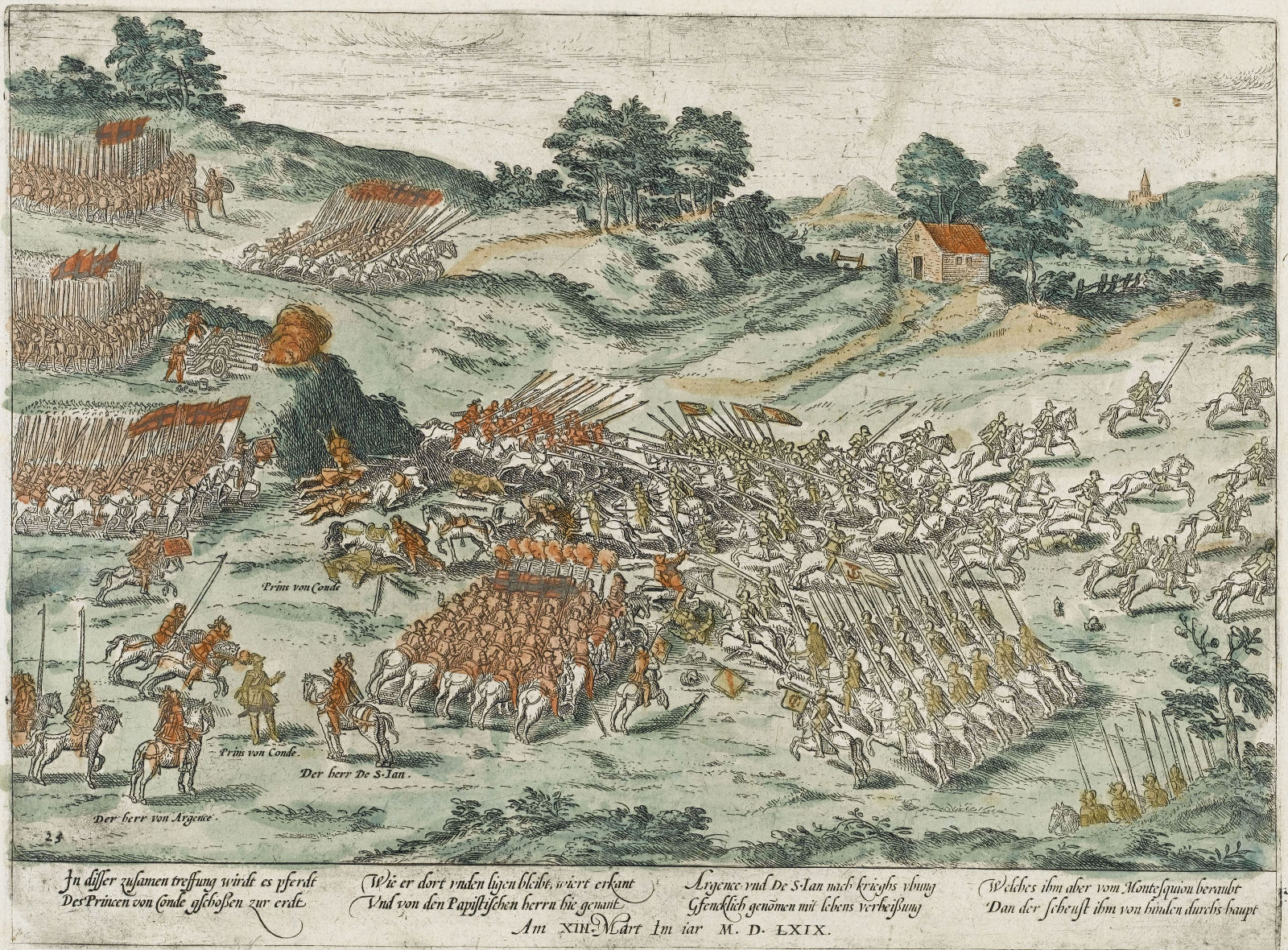
- Battle of Jarnac
Date	13 March 1569
Location	Bassac, outside Jarnac, France 45.681°N 0.175°W
Result	Catholic victory

Belligerents
Catholics	French Huguenots

Commanders and leaders
Gaspard de Saulx, sieur de Tavannes; Henry, Duke of Anjou; Louis, Duke of Montpensier	Louis I de Bourbon, prince de Condé †; Gaspard II de Coligny

Strength
300	800

The Battle of Jarnac on 13 March 1569 was an encounter during the French Wars of Religion between the Catholic forces of Marshal Gaspard de Saulx, sieur de Tavannes and the Huguenots led by Louis I de Bourbon, prince de Condé. The two forces met outside Jarnac between the right bank of the Charente and the high road between Angoulême and Cognac. The Huguenots were routed and Condé was killed after his surrender and his body paraded on an ass in Jarnac.

== Prelude ==
In late 1568 the Huguenot and Royal armies both circled Loudun seeking to find good ground to attack the other, but terrible weather scuppered these attempts. The Royal army broke off towards Chinon to make camp, whilst the Huguenot forces tried and failed to take Saumur before likewise settling into camp. Hearing the Huguenot forces intended to break south towards Cognac, Marshal Gaspard de Tavannes, superior in cavalry, crossed the Charente by the bridge at Châteauneuf on the night of 12 March. With him were 27,000 men for this surprise attack on the rearguard of the Huguenot army.

== Battle ==
The Huguenot forces left by Admiral Coligny to defend the area where Tavannes crossed were negligent in their duties and did not detect the Catholic forces until the majority had passed over. Coligny now had to concentrate his dispersed forces in the face of this unexpected thrust. He brought as many of these as he could find to the villages of Bassac and Triac, which lay to the west of the marshy Guirlande stream.

Around 11:00, the Catholic vanguard under Louis, Duke of Montpensier, consisting in total of 4,000 horse and 7,000 foot, attacked Coligny's position along the Guirlande. This was defended by Huguenot arquebusiers. Montpensier engaged these with 1,200 arquebusiers drawn from his own veteran infantry regiments while 500 of his cavalry sought a crossing further upstream. The Catholic infantry pushed the Huguenots back, forcing them to retreat to the village of Bassac. To cover this movement, Huguenot cavalry were dispatched to aid them. However, the Royalist avant-garde cavalry had found a crossing and wheeled down against their left flank. The Huguenot horse was scattered towards Triac.

Coligny launched fresh cavalry at Montpensier's now somewhat disorganised units and drove them back to the Guirlande.

Tavannes sensed that the forward elements of his army were becoming extended and brought forward 2,500 mercenary reiters to support them. They were able to halt Coligny's cavalry, who were forced to retreat. When the Catholics resumed their attack on the village of Bassac, the defenders were likewise forced to fall back to the Huguenot position forming around Triac.

The southern end of this position, next to the Charente, was covered by a large pond and a narrow valley. It was covered by a force of Coligny's arquebusiers. The difficulty of negotiating these obstacles temporarily deterred the Catholic advance.

Having received the Admiral's request for assistance, Condé marched towards the battle. He gathered up his cavalry as he did so and arrived by Tirac at 13:00.

By this time the Henry, Duke of Anjou had come up with the main battle and Tavannes realised that the ground north of the pond was suitable to resume the advance. Montpensier's vanguard cavalry moved first. They were followed by the battle. The southern end of this formation, nearest the Charente, consisted of the Catholic reiters. The Catholic guns fired a couple of salvoes before the cavalry moved forward to attack at about 14:00.

The Huguenots countered by attacking with both the left and right wings of cavalry, but these jaded horsemen gave way before Montpensier's more numerous cavalry. At this point the Prince threw himself and his followers into the midst of the Catholic forces, turning back the vanguard cavalry and driving into Anjou's own horsemen. But gallant though the charge was, it was doomed to failure. The scattered Huguenot horsemen could make no impression on the Catholic foot.

The Catholic reiters managed to force their way past the infantry guarding the road that linked Brassac to Tirac. From this position, they were able to fall on Condé's flank. Condé was dismounted, many Huguenot gentlemen falling around him. Despite being unarmed and under guard, the Prince was executed, possibly by a Gascon named Montesquiou, and his corpse was paraded in Jarnac to the jeers of the local populace.

Minor participants on the Huguenot side were the English volunteer Walter Raleigh and Louis of Nassau.

== Aftermath ==
Under the leadership of Gaspard II de Coligny, most of the Huguenot army managed to escape the attack unscathed, regrouping at Cognac and Saintes. There it swore allegiance to Henry of Navarre and Louis' son Henri, Prince of Condé while waiting for news of their German allies. The Royal army could pursue no further than Cognac, lacking the heavy guns necessary to reduce the town; the guns had not yet arrived from Paris. Thus the pursuit was broken off to turn instead to besieging Mussidan and Aubeterre-sur-Dronne.

On 25 June, the two armies met again at the Battle of La Roche-l'Abeille, resulting in a victory for Coligny. The Battle of Moncontour in October of the same year would provide the Catholics with a more definitive victory.

== Bibliography ==
- Tucker, Spencer C., ed. (2010). "13 March 1569: Western Europe: France: Wars of Religion: Battle of Jarnac". A Global Chronology of Conflict: From the Ancient World to the Modern Middle East. Vol. Two. ABC-Clio.
- van Tol, Jonas (2019). Germany and the French Wars of Religion, 1560–1572. Brill Publishers.
- Wood, James (1996). The King's Army: Warfare, Soldiers and Society during the Wars of Religion in France 1562–1576. Cambridge University Press. ISBN 0521525136.
- O'Brien de Clare, T. J. (2021). One Faith, One Law, One King: French Armies of the Wars of Religion 1562–1598. Helion. ISBN 978-1-914059-70-4.
