= Marie de Bourbon, Countess of Soissons =

Marie de Bourbon
- Princess of Carignano
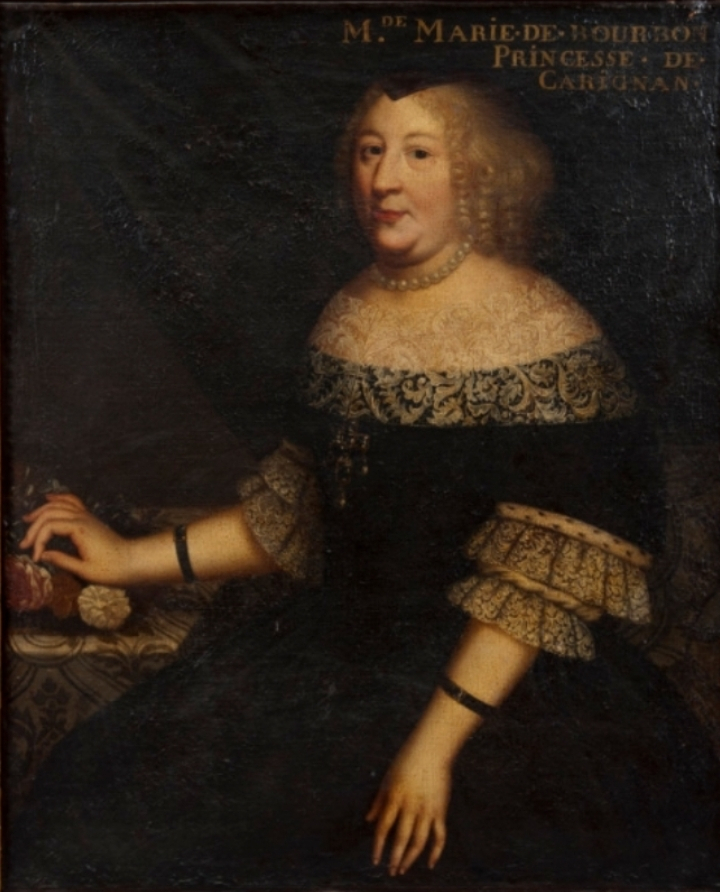
- Born: 3 May 1606; Hôtel de Soissons, Paris, France
- Died: 3 June 1692 (aged 86); Hôtel de Soissons, Paris, France
- Spouse: Thomas Francis, Prince of Carignano (m. 1625; died 1656)
- Issue Detail: Louise, Hereditary Princess of Baden-Baden; Emmanuel Philibert, Prince of Carignano; Joseph Emmanuel, Count of Soissons; Eugene Maurice, Count of Soissons
- House: Bourbon-Condé
- Father: Charles, Count of Soissons
- Mother: Anne, Countess of Clermont

Marie de Bourbon (3 May 1606 – 3 June 1692) was the wife of Thomas Francis, Prince of Carignano, and thus a princess of Savoy by marriage. At the death of her brother in 1641, she became Countess of Soissons in her own right, passing the title down three generations of the House of Savoy.

== Biography ==
Marie de Bourbon, born at the Hôtel de Soissons in Paris, was the second daughter and youngest child of Charles de Bourbon, Count of Soissons, and his wife Anne de Montafié, Countess of Clermont. At the court of Louis XIII, who was her second cousin, Marie enjoyed the rank of princesse du sang. She was a sister of Louise of Bourbon, Duchess of Longueville. Originally placed in the Abbey of Fontevraud in Anjou, she took the habit on 10 April 1610 aged just four.

On 6 January 1625, Marie was married to Thomas Francis, ninth child of Charles Emmanuel I, Duke of Savoy, and his wife Catherine Michaela of Austria. It was arranged that Thomas, as son of a reigning monarch, would hold the rank of first among the princes étrangers at the French court – taking precedence even before the formerly all-powerful House of Guise, whose kinship to the sovereign Duke of Lorraine was more remote. He was appointed Grand Master of France of the king's household, briefly replacing the traitorous Louis II de Condé. He engaged the services of the distinguished grammarian and courtier Claude Favre de Vaugelas as tutor for his children.

After Thomas, the senior branch of his descendants repatriated to Savoy, alternately marrying French, Italian and German princesses.

After the Bourbons obtained the French crown and the Princes de Condé and their heirs apparent became known (by right of their rank as First Prince of the Blood), respectively, as Monsieur le Prince and Monsieur le Duc, Charles came to be styled Monsieur le Comte at court. That honorific was borne also by his son Louis and, subsequently, by the Savoy-Carignano counts of Soissons, who inherited the countship from Charles's daughter, Marie, princesse de Carignano, even though they ranked as princes étrangers in France rather than as princes du sang.

At the death of her older brother Louis of Bourbon (6 July 1641), Marie was named his heir and became the Countess of Soissons suo jure. She lived in her native France with her husband and resided at the Hôtel de Soissons where she was born. It was Marie who built the small Château de Bagnolet in Paris; at her death the building was acquired by the Ferme générale François Le Juge. In 1719 it became the property of Françoise Marie de Bourbon. Marie and her daughter helped to raise the famous soldier Prince Eugene of Savoy. She died in Paris.

== Issue ==
1. Princess Cristine Charlotte of Savoy (1626).
2. Princess Louise of Savoy (1627–1689) married in 1654 to Ferdinand Maximilian, Hereditary Prince of Baden-Baden.
3. Emmanuel Philibert, Prince of Carignano (1628–1709) married Maria Angela Caterina d'Este
4. Prince Amedeo of Savoy (1629).
5. Joseph Emmanuel, Count of Soissons (1631–1656).
6. Eugene Maurice, Count of Soissons (1633–1673) married Olympia Mancini.
7. Prince Ferdinand of Savoy (1637).

== Sources ==
- Orr, Clarissa Campbell (2004). Queenship in Europe 1660-1815: The Role of the Consort. Cambridge University Press.
- Pitts, Vincent Joseph (2000). La Grande Mademoiselle at the Court of France: 1627-1693. The Johns Hopkins University Press.
- Spanheim, Ézéchiel (1973). Emile Bourgeois (ed.). Relation de la Cour de France. le Temps retrouvé (in French). Paris: Mercure de France. pp. 323, 107–108.
