= Françoise d'Orléans-Longueville =

Princess of Condé (1549–1601)

- Princess of Condé
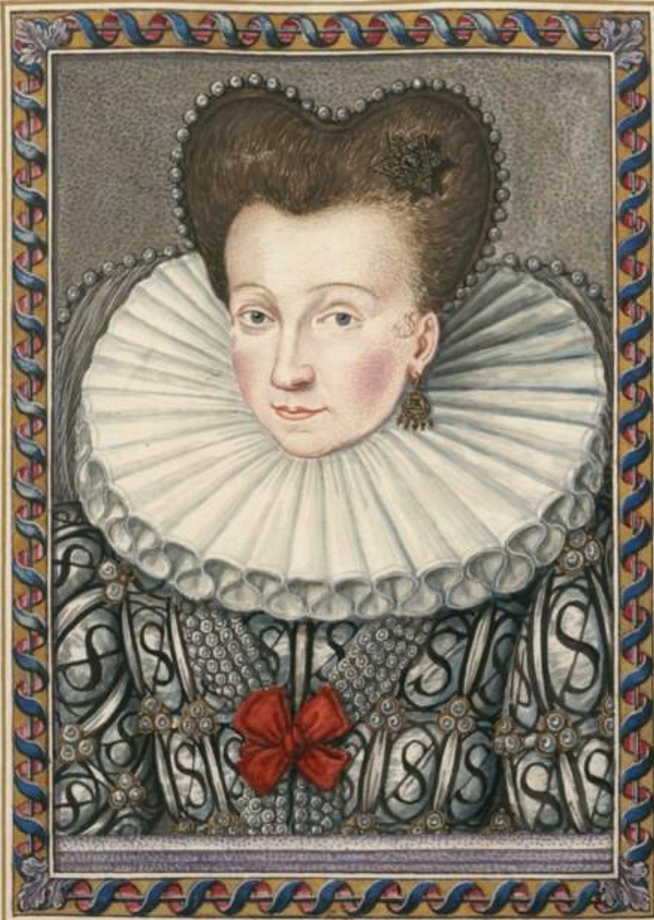
- Born: 5 April 1549; Châteaudun, France
- Died: 11 June 1601 (aged 52); Paris, France
- Spouse: Louis I de Bourbon, Prince of Condé
- Issue: Charles de Bourbon, Count of Soissons; Louis de Bourbon; Benjamin de Bourbon
Names
- Françoise d'Orléans
- House: Orléans
- Father: François d'Orléans, Marquis of Rothelin
- Mother: Jacqueline de Rohan
- Religion: Roman Catholic (formerly Huguenot)

Françoise d'Orléans-Longueville, Princess of Condé (5 April 1549 – 11 June 1601) was the second wife of Louis de Bourbon, Prince of Condé, a "Prince du Sang" and leader of the Huguenots during the French Wars of Religion.

== Life ==
Françoise was born on 5 April 1549 in Châteaudun, France. She was the only daughter of François d'Orléans, Marquis of Rothelin, and Jacqueline de Rohan. Her father had died on 25 October 1548, less than six months before her birth. From birth she was known as Mademoiselle de Longueville.

== Marriage ==
On 8 November 1565, in the Château de Vendôme, Françoise married Louis I de Bourbon, Prince of Condé, the youngest brother of King Antoine of Navarre and a Huguenot general. This made Francoise the sister-in-law of the powerful Jeanne d'Albret, who was queen regnant of Navarre and the spiritual leader of the Huguenots. Condé's first wife, Eléanor de Roucy de Roye, had died in 1564. Together Françoise and Louis had three sons, only one of whom lived to adulthood.

The year before their marriage, Conde's mistress, Isabelle de Limeuil, a member of Queen Mother Catherine de' Medici's notorious escadron volant ("flying squadron"), had given birth to a child which she claimed was fathered by Condé, who staunchly denied the accusation.

== Widowhood ==
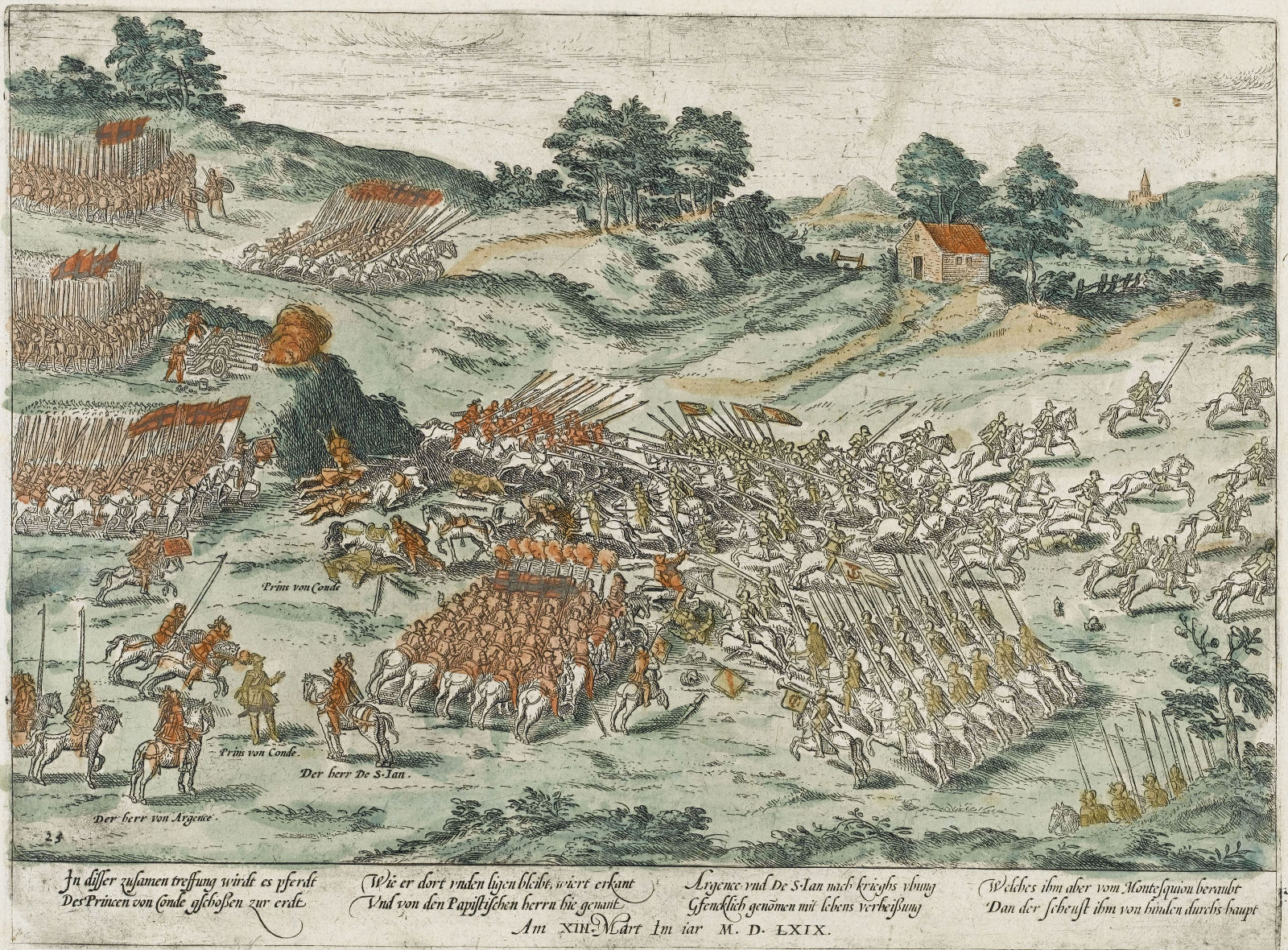
The Battle of Jarnac where Françoise's husband was killed and the Huguenot army defeated by the Catholic forces

On 13 March 1569, in the Third War of Religion, Françoise's husband was slain at the Battle of Jarnac when the Huguenot army was defeated by the Catholic forces led by Marshal Gaspard de Saulx, sieur de Tavannes, and the Duke of Anjou, who would later rule as King Henry III. Queen Elizabeth I of England, herself being Protestant, promised to lend money to the Huguenot faction, however, Françoise was required to pledge her jewels as security.

As one of Jeanne d'Albret's closest confidants, Françoise attended Jeanne on her deathbed. After Jeanne's death, Françoise stated "it is a terrible loss to us". After the night of the St. Bartholomew's Day massacre on 23 August 1572, she and her son quickly converted to Roman Catholicism to avoid persecution and possible assassination.

Françoise died in Paris on 11 June 1601 at the age of 52, and was buried at Gaillon.

== Issue ==
Françoise and Louis had:

- Charles, Count of Soissons (3 November 1566 – 1 November 1612), married Anne de Montafié (1577–1644)
- Louis de Bourbon (1567–1569), died in childhood.
- Benjamin de Bourbon (1569–1573), died in childhood.

== Sources ==
- Barbier, Jean Paul (2002). Ma bibliothèque Poétique (in French). Librairie Droz S.A.
- Quantin, Jean-Louis; Waquet, Jean-Claude (2007). Papes, princes et savants dans l'Europe moderne mélanges à la mémoire de Bruno Neveu (in French). Librairie Droz S.A.
- Reger, William (2016). The Limits of Empire: European Imperial Formations in Early Modern World History Essays in Honor of Geoffrey Parker. Taylor & Francis.
- Roelker, Nancy Lyman (1968). Queen of Navarre, Jeanne d'Albret, 1528-1572. Harvard University Press.
- Strage, Mark (1976). Women of Power: The Life and Times of Catherine de' Medici. Harcourt, Brace & Jovanovich.
