= Louis, Count of Soissons =

Louis de Bourbon
- Count of Soissons
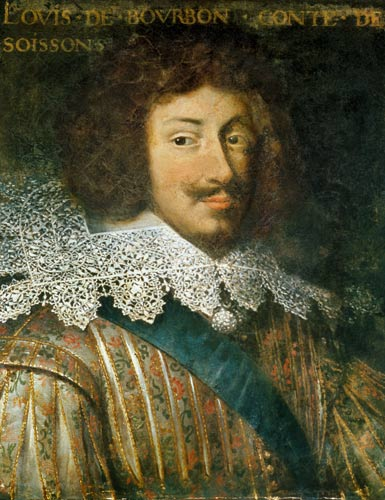
- Contemporary portrait of Louis de Bourbon
- Born: 1 May 1604; Paris, France
- Died: 6 July 1641 (aged 37); Battle of La Marfée, Sedan, Ardennes, France
- Issue: Louis Henri, Count of Noyers
- House: Bourbon-Condé
- Father: Charles, Count of Soissons
- Mother: Anne de Montafié

Louis de Bourbon, Comte de Soissons (May 1604 – 6 July 1641) was the son of Charles de Bourbon, Count of Soissons and his wife, Anne de Montafié, Countess of Clermont-en-Beauvaisis. A second cousin of Louis XIII he was a prince du Sang, those considered part of the royal family. Part of the faction who opposed Cardinal Richelieu and his policy of war with Spain, he was killed leading a revolt at the Battle of La Marfée in 1641.

== Biography ==
Born in Paris, Louis was the son of Charles de Bourbon, Count of Soissons and his wife, Anne de Montafié. He was made governor of the Dauphiné province (1612), an office inherited at the death of his father, and later governor of the Champagne province (1631). Around 1612, he was made the Grand Master of France, the head of the royal household.

In 1636, Louis pressured his cousin Gaston d'Orléans and the count of Montrésor with the intention to murder Cardinal Richelieu and depose the King, but the plot failed. The King's mother, Marie de' Medici, had tried as well on numerous occasions to remove the Cardinal as well as once trying to depose the King in favor of her younger son Gaston. For this she was placed under house arrest for the remainder of her life.

Taking refuge in Sedan with the Duke of Bouillon (prince of the independent principality of Sedan), Louis again conspired against Richelieu, and the Duke of Bouillon obtained the military support of Spain.

Louis's army was engaged by a royal French army under Gaspard de Coligny, Marshal Châtillon at Sedan, but Coligny was routed at the Battle of La Marfée outside of Sedan on 6 July 1641. Of the King's 11,000 force, 600 were killed, 5500 were taken prisoner, while the Count of Soissons' forces suffered nominal losses. This was due to the late slow arrival of the King's forces through muddy roads and the surprise cavalry attack from their flank from behind a hill. The Count of Soissons, however, was killed after the battle by one officer whose identity was never ascertained, possibly in the employ of Cardinal Richelieu. According to some sources, the Count died by accident while lifting the visor of his helmet with a loaded pistol, shooting himself in the head.

He was buried in the Soissons family tomb at the Chartreuse de Bourbon-lez-Gaillon in Gaillon, in the French province of Normandy. The county of Soissons was passed onto his only surviving sister Marie de Bourbon, Princess of Carignano and wife of Thomas Francis of Savoy, a famous general.

== Issue ==
- Louis Henri de Bourbon, bâtard de Soissons, Count of Noyers and of Dunois, Prince of Neuchâtel (August 1640 – 8 February 1703) illegitimate son of Louis and Élisabeth des Hayes. Line continues in the Dukes of Luynes family. Married Angelique Cunegonde de Montmorency-Luxembourg, daughter of François Henri de Montmorency.

== See also ==
- Chalais conspiracy

== Sources ==
- Jaffré, Marc W.S. (2025). The Courtiers and the Court of Louis XIII, 1610–1643. Oxford University Press. ISBN 9780198957621.
- Parker, Geoffrey (2013). Global Crisis: War, Climate Change, and Catastrophe in the Seventeenth Century. Yale University Press. ISBN 9780300189193.
- Pitts, Vincent Joseph (2000). La Grande Mademoiselle at the Court of France: 1627-1693. The Johns Hopkins University Press. ISBN 9780801864667.
- Rowlands, Guy (2002). The Dynastic State and the Army under Louis XIV: Royal Service and Private Interest, 1661-1701. Cambridge University Press. ISBN 9781139439305.
- Tapie, Victor L. (1975). Lockie, D. McN. (ed.). France in the Age of Louis XIII and Richelieu (4th ed.). Praeger Publishers. ISBN 0-275-52530-9.
