= Bonnétable =

- Commune
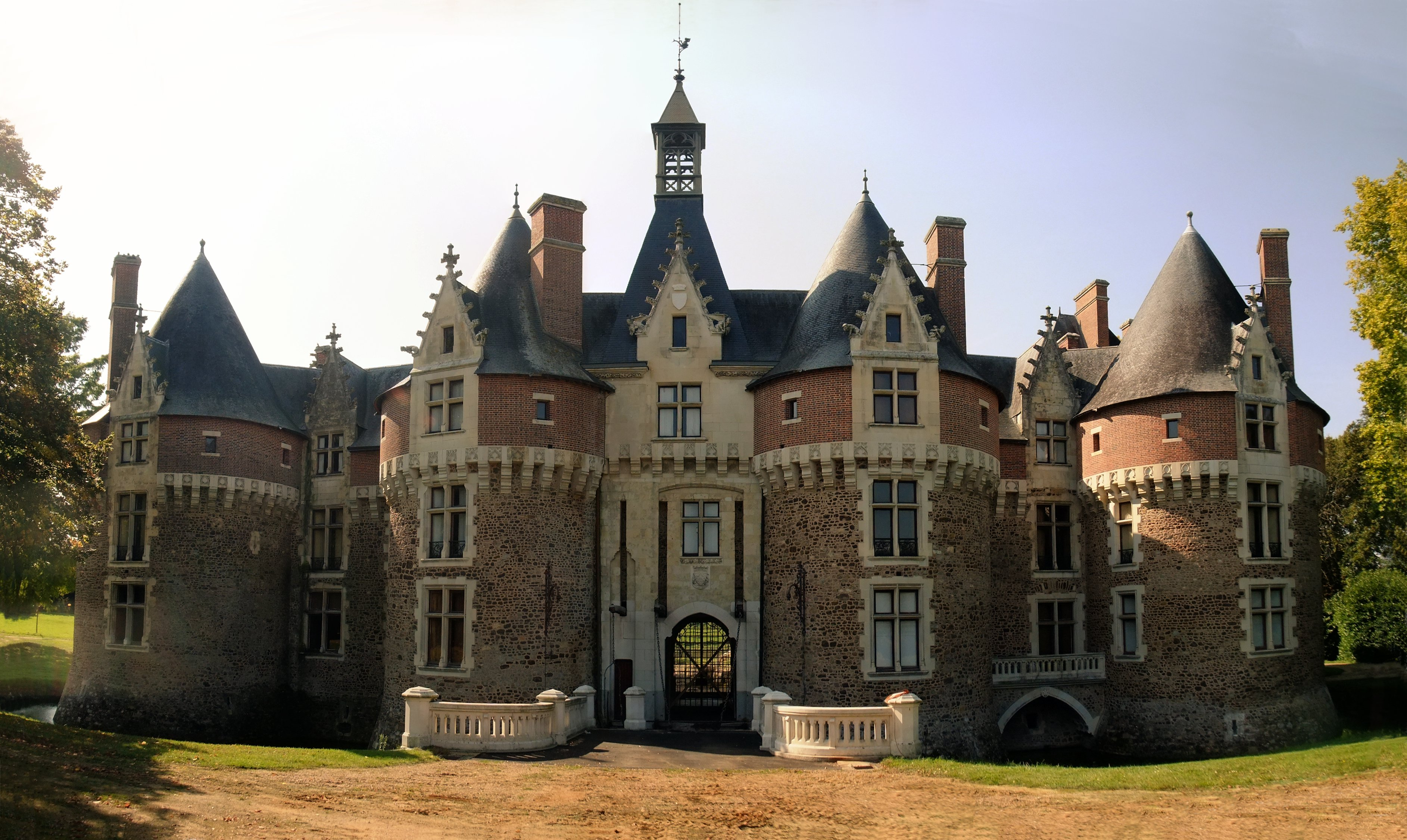
- Château de Bonnétable

- Coat of arms
- Location of Bonnétable
- Location within France Location within Pays de la Loire
- Coordinates: 48°11′00″N 0°26′00″E
- Country: France
- Region: Pays de la Loire
- Department: Sarthe
- Arrondissement: Mamers
- Canton: Bonnétable
- Intercommunality: Maine Saosnois

Government
  - Mayor (2020–2026): Frédéric Barré
- Area^{1}: 40.08 km^{2} (15.47 sq mi)
- Highest elevation: 167 m (548 ft)
- Lowest elevation: 77 m (253 ft)
- Population (2023): 3,703
  - Density: 92.39/km^{2} (239.3/sq mi)
- Demonym(s): Bonnétablien, Bonnétablienne
- Time zone: UTC+01:00 (CET)
  - Summer (DST): UTC+02:00 (CEST)
- INSEE/Postal code: 72039 /72110
- ^{1} French Land Register data, which excludes lakes, ponds, glaciers > 1 km^{2} (0.386 sq mi or 247 acres) and river estuaries.

Bonnétable (French pronunciation: [bɔnetabl]) is a commune in the Sarthe department in the region of Pays de la Loire, northwestern France. In February 1965, it absorbed the former commune Aulaines.

Bonnétable is twinned with Horncastle in rural Lincolnshire. The towns' relationship is commemorated by a Rue Horncastle in Bonnétable, and a Bonnetable (sic; no acute accent on the e) Road in Horncastle.

== Population ==
Historical population
Year	Pop.	±% p.a.
1968	3,505	—
1975	3,833	+1.29%
1982	3,826	−0.03%
1990	3,899	+0.24%
1999	4,018	+0.33%
2007	4,143	+0.38%
2012	3,950	−0.95%
2017	3,856	−0.48%
2023	3,703	−0.67%
Source: INSEE

== See also ==
- Communes of the Sarthe department
- Château de Bonnétable
