= Éléonore de Roye =

French noblewoman, first wife of Louis I de Bourbon (1535–1564)

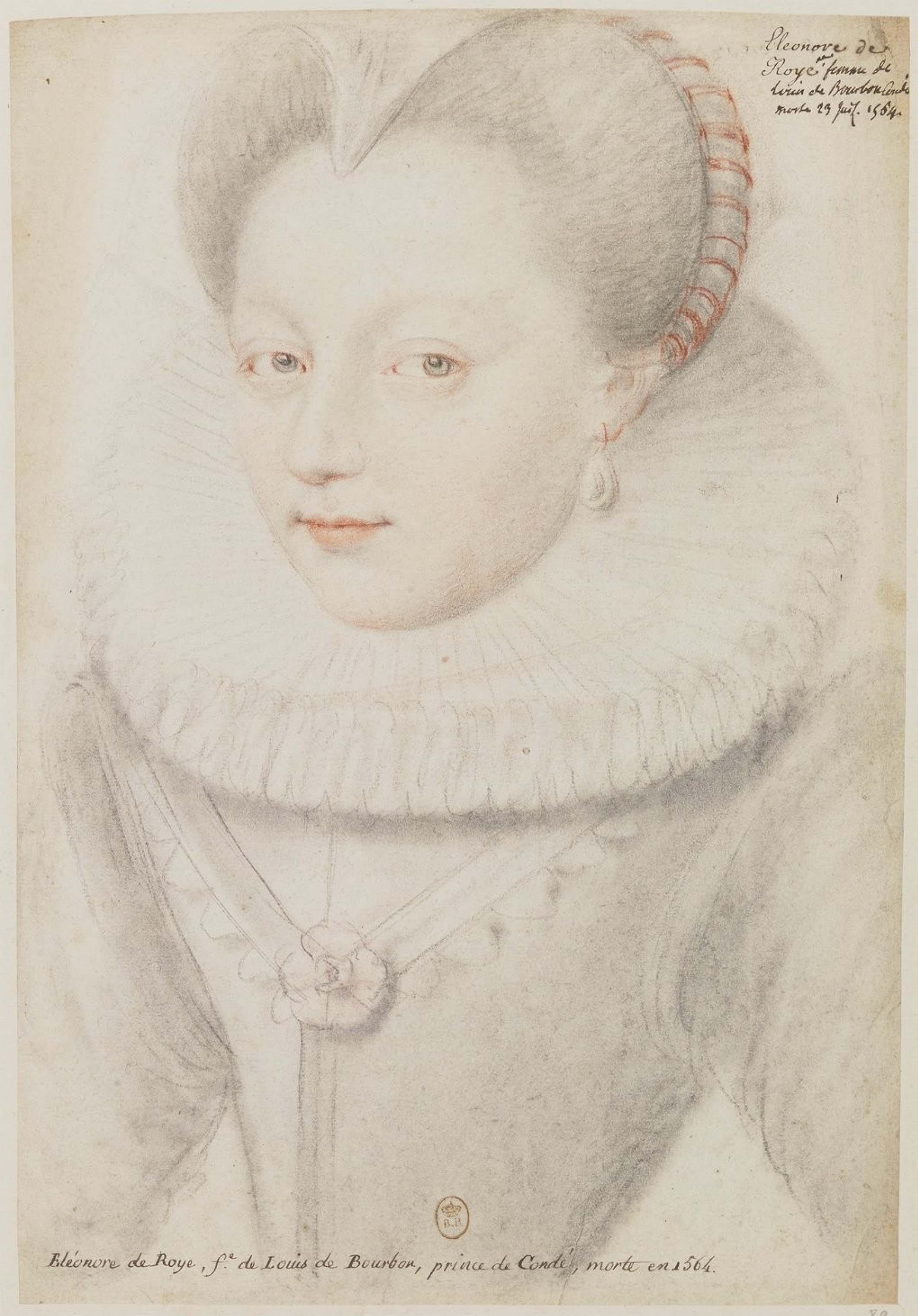
- Drawing by Daniel Dumonstier
- Born: 24 February 1535; France
- Died: 23 July 1564 (aged 29); Château de Condé, France
- Burial: France
- Spouse: Louis I de Bourbon, prince de Condé
- Issue: Henri I de Bourbon, prince de Condé; François de Bourbon, prince de Conti; Charles II de Bourbon-Vendôme
- Father: Charles de Roye
- Mother: Madeleine de Mailly

Éléonore (or Eléanor) de Roye, princesse de Condé (24 February 1535 – 23 July 1564) was a French noblewoman. She was the eldest daughter and heiress of Charles, seigneur (sire) de Roye and de Muret, comte de Roucy. Her mother, Madeleine de Mailly, dame de Conti, was the daughter of Louise de Montmorency and half-sister of Admiral Coligny, d'Andelot, and Cardinal de Châtillon. Éléonore was the first wife of Louis I de Bourbon, prince de Condé; as such, she was the sister-in-law of Antoine of Navarre and aunt of King Henry IV.

Éléonore inherited the county of Roucy through her father and the lordship of Conti through her mother. On 22 June 1551, she married Louis I de Bourbon, prince de Condé at age sixteen, and converted him to the Reformed (Protestant) faith. They had eight children, of whom only two, Henri and François, were to have progeny.

During the first of the French Wars of Religion, especially between 1560 and 1563, Éléonore and her mother were engaged in important political activities in support of her husband, the Prince of Condé. Twice while Condé was a prisoner of the ultra-catholic Guise family, his wife and mother-in-law systematically reinforced his alliances with Protestant German princes and with Elizabeth I of England. Armed with this support, Éléonore made negotiations by letter and by direct contact with the regent, Catherine de' Medici; the outcome was the Peace of Amboise and the release of her husband.

She died in July 1564.

== Ancestors ==
Ancestors of Éléonore de Roye

8. Jean de Roye, seigneur de Muret
4. Antoine de Roye, seigneur de Muret
9. Marguerite du Bois des Querdes
2. Charles de Roye, comte de Roucy
10. Robert de Sarrebruck, comte de Roucy
5. Catherine de Sarrebruck, comtesse de Roucy
11. Marie d'Amboise
1. Éléonore de Roye
12. Adrien de Mailly, seigneur de Conti
6. Ferry de Mailly, seigneur de Conti
13. Jeanne de Glymes
3. Madeleine de Mailly, dame de Conti
14. Guillaume, seigneur de Montmorency
7. Louise de Montmorency
15. Anne Pot, dame de la Rochepot
