= Louis I, Prince of Condé =

1st Prince of Condé (1530–1569)

Louis de Bourbon
- 1st Prince of Condé
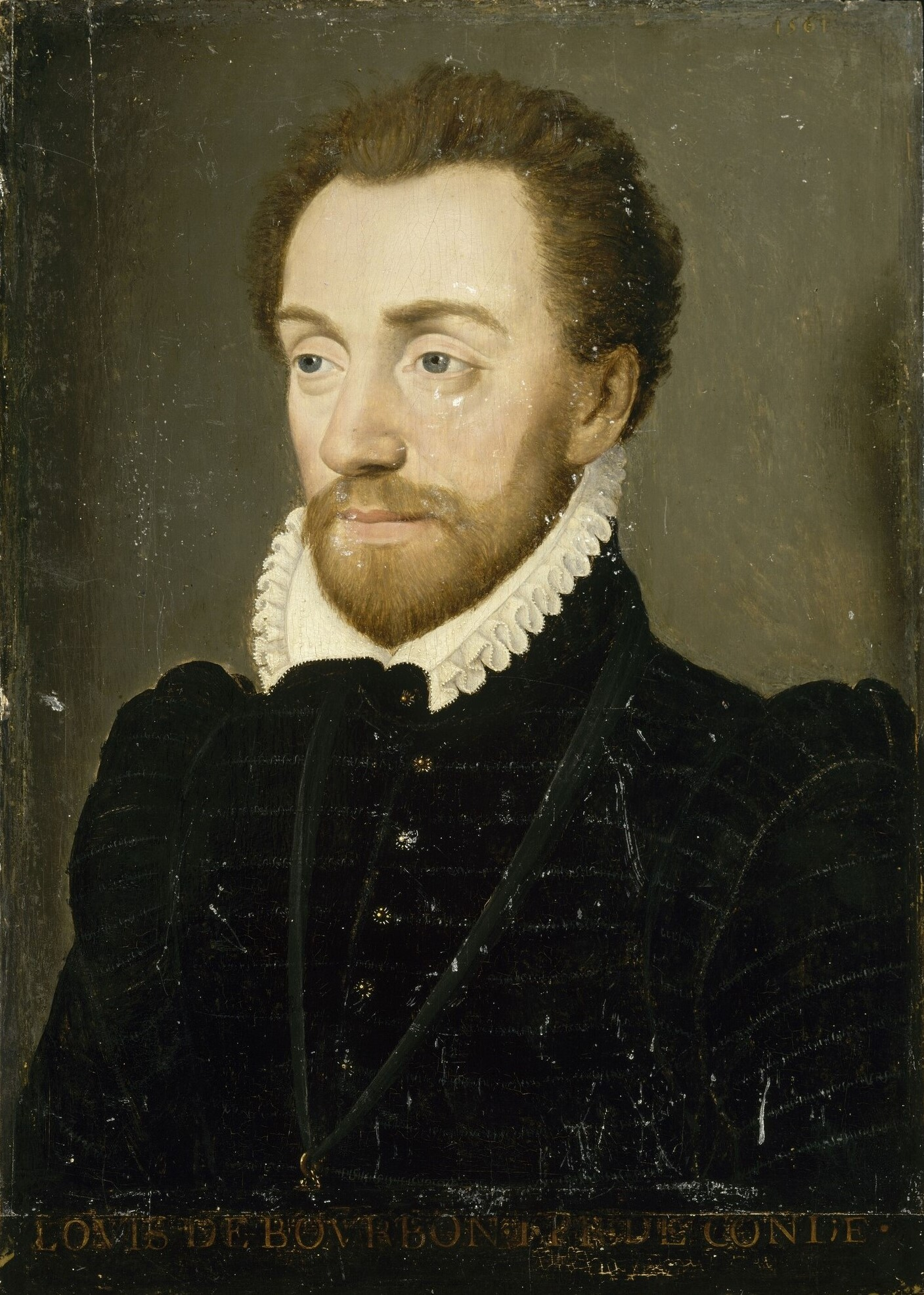
- Portrait at the Palace of Versailles, 16th century

Prince of Condé
- Reign: 15 July 1546 – 13 March 1569
- Predecessor: New title
- Successor: Henri I
- Born: 7 May 1530; Vendôme
- Died: 13 March 1569 (aged 38); Jarnac
- Spouses: Éléanore de Roucy; Françoise d'Orléans
- Issue and more: Henri I, Prince of Condé; François, Prince of Conti; Charles II, Cardinal de Bourbon; Charles, Count of Soissons
Names
- Louis de Bourbon
- House: Bourbon (Condé branch) (founded)
- Father: Charles, Duke of Vendôme
- Mother: Françoise d'Alençon
- Religion: Calvinist (Huguenot) prev. Catholic

Louis de Bourbon, 1st Prince of Condé (7 May 1530 – 13 March 1569) was a prominent Huguenot leader and general, the founder of the Condé branch of the House of Bourbon. Coming from a position of relative political unimportance during the reign of Henri II, Condé's support for the Huguenots, along with his leading role in the conspiracy of Amboise and its aftermath, pushed him to the centre of French politics. Arrested during the reign of Francis II then released upon the latter's premature death, he would lead the Huguenot forces in the first three civil wars of the French Wars of Religion before being executed after his defeat at the Battle of Jarnac in 1569.

== Early life ==
Born in Vendôme, he was the fifth son of Charles de Bourbon, Duke of Vendôme. His mother was Françoise d'Alençon, the eldest daughter of René, Duke of Alençon, and Margaret of Lorraine. His older brother Antoine de Bourbon married Jeanne d'Albret (Queen of Navarre). Their son, Condé's nephew, became Henry IV of France. Condé's cousin through his father (who was the brother of Antoinette de Bourbon) was Mary of Guise.

== Reigns of Henri II and Francis II ==
=== Reign of Henri II ===
As a soldier in the French army, Condé fought at the Siege of Metz in 1552 where Francis, Duke of Guise, successfully defended the city from the forces of Emperor Charles V. He, and his brother Enghien were responsible for the section of walls from Saint-Thibaut gate to the river Seille. He would also fight at the disastrous Battle of St. Quentin in 1557. Despite his military participation, neither he nor his brother would hold significant office during the reign of Henri, the king choosing instead to lavish it on his favourites Anne de Montmorency and Francis, Duke of Guise, leaving Condé comparatively poor.

=== Reign of Francis II ===
==== Death of Henri ====
The sudden death of Henri II changed the landscape of French politics overnight, and Condé was present at his brother's negotiations with the House of Montmorency and House of Bourbon-Montpensier as they sought to negotiate who would be the powerbroker for the young king. Ultimately the family would be outmanoeuvred by the Guise, who bought Condé off with a promise that he would receive the governorship of Picardy which his family claimed as a hereditary right, and a cash gift of 70,000 livres. Despite this bribe, opposition would grow to the new Guise administration from various factions, and Condé would find himself drawn to it. When his brother declined the Amboise conspirators' request for him to be their prince of the blood figurehead, they turned to Condé's weaker claim as a junior prince of the blood, hoping he would lead them. As rumours of a conspiracy began to reach their ears, the Guise quickly came to suspect Condé's involvement, and his governorship of Picardy failed to materialise.

==== Conspiracy of Amboise ====
In February the Guise finally had the proof of conspiracy they'd been looking for, from a conspirator who had gotten cold feet, and they moved the court to the secure castle of Amboise, and summoned the senior nobility to the castle including Condé, so that they might aid in the defence. As the conspirators were crushed over the following days, Condé could do little but watch from the battlements. Eager to avoid suspicion, Condé lingered at the court in the following days, angrily denouncing the rumours of his involvement that were swirling as the product of 'scum.' He followed this up by calling anyone who would accuse him a liar, a serious rebuke in aristocratic circles, and offering to duel anyone who would dare accuse him to his face. While convinced of his guilt, the duke of Guise was conscious for the moment he lacked the necessary evidence, and assured Condé that no one doubted his honour. During his reassurance, his brother, Charles, Cardinal of Lorraine studiously looked at the floor. On 18 April, while Condé was attending the King's levée, the Guise had his apartments raided for evidence, but, finding nothing, made no move against him. Very much aware of how much suspicion he was under, Condé took the opportunity to depart from court.

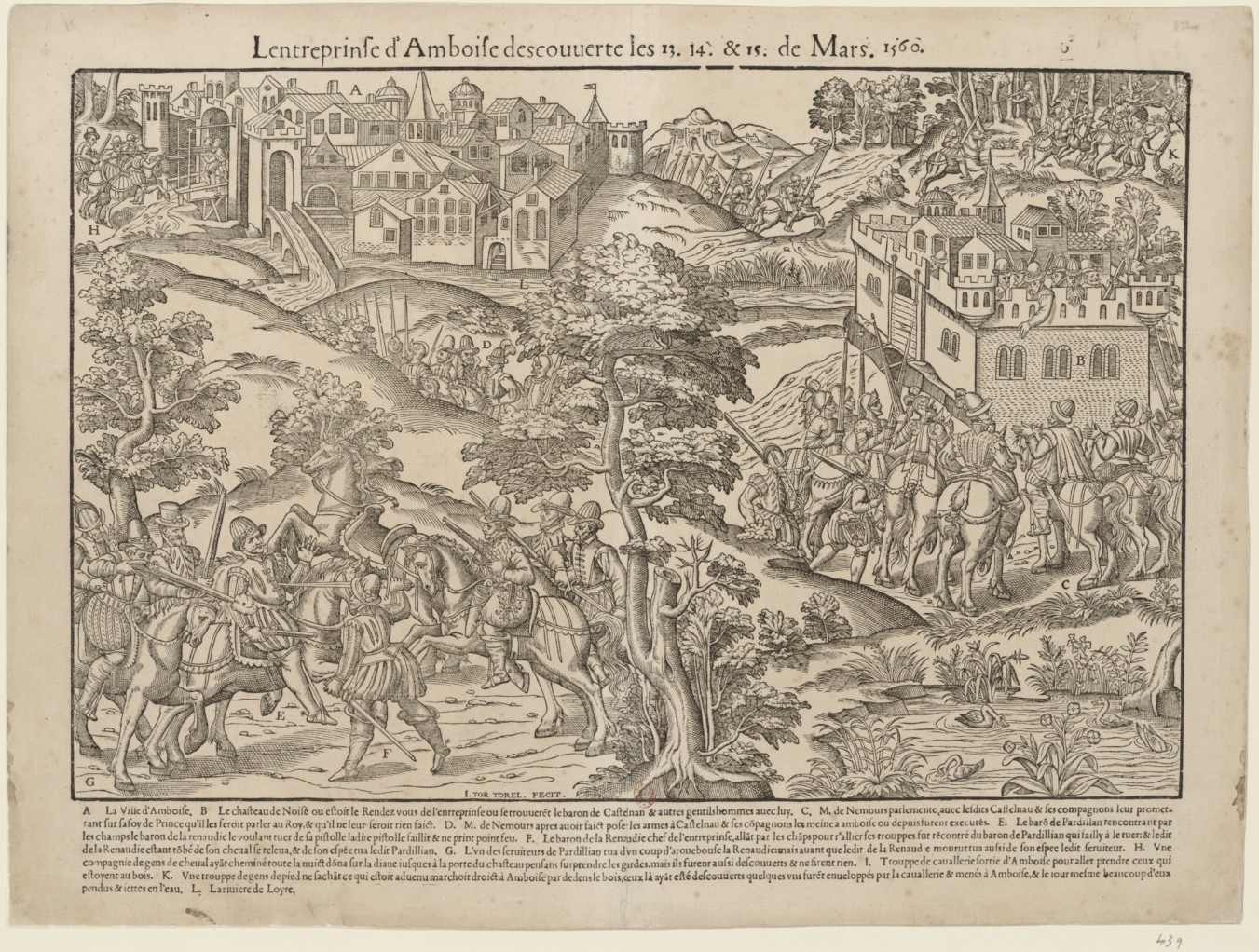
The Conspiracy of Amboise, by Jean Perrisin and Jacque Tortorel

==== Lyon, arrest, release ====
Despite the failure of the attempt to seize the king at Amboise, disorder continued throughout the kingdom, as independent armies raised in support of the effort marauded in a guerrilla war. Condé continued to intrigue, planning to send troops to Lyon to seize the city and use it as a nucleus of opposition to the Guise. The uprising in Lyon was, however, discovered before it could begin, and the Guise suspicions of Condé and Navarre's involvement was seemingly confirmed when the Guise captured an agent of Condé's with papers that implicated him. Furious, and at last holding firm evidence, the brothers were invited to attend the upcoming Assembly of Notables. Conscious that they would certainly be arrested if they came, Navarre and Condé remained in the family powerbase of Vendôme. Hoping to isolate the Bourbon-Vendôme from their prince of the blood cousins, the Guise created two super-governorships controlling much of the country, giving one to Charles, Prince of La Roche-sur-Yon, and the other to Louis, Duke of Montpensier. They then began assembling an army of 40,000, warning the renegade brothers of what was to come if they did not present themselves at court for the Estates General of 1560–61. Possessing only 6,000 foot soldiers between them, the two travelled north without a fight, and Condé was promptly arrested on 31 October.

The Guise set about arranging a trial for Condé on the charge of treason. Condé tried various methods to filibuster the proceedings, refusing to recognise the authority of his judges and demanding a trial by his peers. Despite this, he would be found guilty, and given an indeterminate prison sentence likely at the dungeons of Loches. Condé would not, however, languish in prison long, and soon the death of the young Francis II would sever the Guise's link to political authority, opening the way for a regency government under Catherine de' Medici. Conscious that the estates might prefer Navarre's rights to the regency, Catherine used the leverage of Condé's imprisonment to buy him off, promising to release him and annul his sentence in return for his support of her governance.

== Reign of Charles IX ==
=== Restoration to favour ===
Condé was released from his captivity 15 days after the death of Francis II, on 20 December 1560. Navarre argued virulently on his behalf in council, making coded implications that revolt would break out if his brother was not restored to favour. Catherine managed to get him to withdraw his threat, and he submitted his recognition of her regency, excusing himself as only wishing to protect his brother from the charges of the Guise. Condé meanwhile, on parole, was waiting up in Picardy for news related to his case, keenly desiring revenge for his prosecution. Catherine oversaw the reconciliation of Navarre and Guise, and informed them that their personal reconciliation would be valid for their whole families. This accomplished, Catherine invited Condé to court. Condé set off with a force of 600 horses; however, he was ordered by Catherine to disperse his retinue and come with no more than 25 horses. He arrived at Fontainebleau on the evening of 9 March. Not quite appreciating his situation, he immediately caused an incident by saying he would refuse to meet with the king until the duke of Guise was dismissed from his presence. Eventually he agreed to meet with them on the condition he need not say anything to Guise. On 13 March Condé swore in front of the court that he had never conspired against the king and the council formally absolved him, with an ordinance by Charles denoting this fact to be registered in Parlement.

The court hoped this would be sufficient for Condé; however, he remained curt with Guise, and sought a further validation of his innocence, a formal judgement from the Parlement that had convicted him, and a denunciation of his accusers. On 17 March he left Fontainebleau still threatening vengeance on his accusers and proceeded to Paris. On 1 April with a large retinue of 500 he attended a Calvinist service in the apartments of Coligny. The Parlement was consumed in its opposition to the Ordinance of Orléans and the Edict of 19 April and did not come to address the matter of Condé's guilt until 13 June, when, under pressure, it declared his innocence. Catherine used the occasion to force the Duke of Guise and Condé to reconcile publicly.

=== First War of Religion ===
==== Road to civil war ====
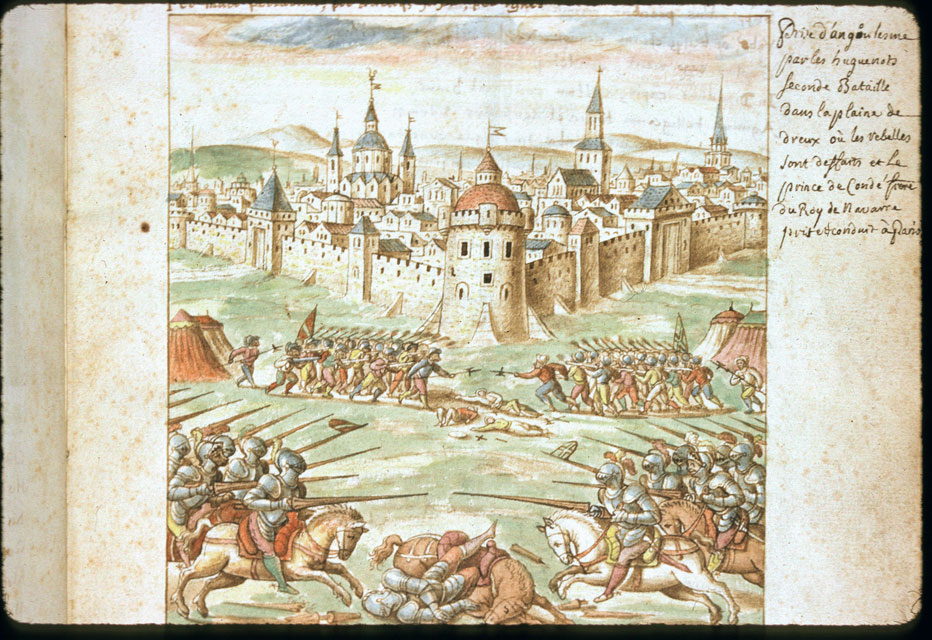
The Battle of Dreux in which Condé was captured

The religious direction of Catherine's government increasingly isolated it among the grandees of the kingdom, with first Guise and Montmorency alienating themselves from the crown and departing court, and then Navarre entering opposition after the publishing of the landmark Edict of January. In this tense political moment, the duke of Guise, while travelling back to Paris at the request of Navarre to aid in his opposition, oversaw a massacre at Wassy. Continuing on to Paris with his retinue of 1,000 men he crossed paths with Condé, accompanied by a retinue of 500, on his way back from a service in the suburbs. Catherine, conscious of the dangers of both being in the city, and angry at Guise for his troops conduct at Wassy, ordered both to vacate the city, but only Condé complied.

While Catherine appealed to Condé for support he departed to Orléans, allowing Guise to take possession of the young king and regent. There, he seized the city on 2 April, and issued a manifesto in which he denounced the "cruel and horrible carnage wrought at Vassy, in the presence of M. de Guise". Several days later the Calvinist synod in the city proclaimed him the protector of all churches in France.

==== Civil war ====
Condé's strategy was to seize strategic towns across France, and leverage them for a favourable settlement. To this end local Huguenots across France were encouraged to rise up, and successfully did so in Tours, Rouen, Montpellier and Blois among other cities. Condé failed to seize on the initial momentum, however, and was in Orléans in May when Catherine sent François de Scépeaux to negotiate with him, offering the deprival of Guise and Montmorency of their offices and the sole command of the French army by his brother. Condé, confident in his position, rejected these terms, demanding instead full religious freedom for Calvinists. Catherine was unwilling to entertain these terms and withdrew the marshals.

When in June the royal army was at last assembled, it marched on Orléans, seeking to pin Condé's forces in the city. Condé, eager to avoid a siege, dispersed his forces into the surrounding country, ending his threat to the city of Paris. With a free hand, the royal army subdued first Bourges, and then upon hearing of Condé's negotiations with Elizabeth I in the Treaty of Hampton Court exchanging Le Havre for military support, moved on Rouen to stop the English linking with Condé. While his brother Navarre would be killed at the siege, the city would be subdued. In an attempt to reduce his numerical inferiority, mercenaries were recruited in Germany and brought into France to supplement Condé's forces. The royal command tasked Marshal Saint André with intercepting them before a linkup was established; he was, however, unable to do so and, troops in hand, Condé began a march on Paris.

His drive on the city would be frustrated, and he was brought to battle as he retreated north at the Battle of Dreux. Condé led the Huguenot forces throughout much of the battle; however, during a retreat of his cavalry he was captured, and after his forces lost the battle, he would be the Duke of Guise's captive. Guise, magnanimous in victory, offered even his bed to the captive prince. However, with the death of the duke, assassinated as he tried to subdue Orléans, the crown which had seemed on the precipice of total victory would lose all momentum. Condé would be summoned, along with Montmorency, by Catherine to negotiate a peace. The Edict of Amboise would confirm a degree of toleration, though more restricted than the sweeping Edict of Saint-Germain in 1562. It largely favoured the aristocratic elements of the Huguenot party, with provisions allowing freedom of worship on the estates of the nobility.

=== Uneasy peace ===
==== Removing the English ====
With the end of the civil war, the matter of the English occupation of Le Havre and Dieppe became a concern for the crown. Catherine decided that a combined army retaking these cities would help heal the wounds of the previous year. While Coligny and Francois de Coligny d'Andelot refused to participate against their former ally, Condé joined in the crown's effort. The forces under the command of Condé, Charles de Cossé, Count of Brissac, and other leaders brought the cities back into submission by August 1563.

==== Feud ====
Meanwhile a feud had been developing between the Guise and Montmorency family, the former of whom blamed Montmorency's nephew Coligny for the assassination of the duke of Guise, the latter of whom had brought his nephew under his protection. Seeking advantage in this quarrel the Cardinal of Lorraine reached out to Condé aiming to build a non-confessional basis of support. This was buoyed by the death of his wife in July 1564, which severed his kinship ties to the Montmorency. The two had a friendly meeting at Soissons where the Cardinal offered him a Guise princess as a new wife. Failing in this, but assured of his goodwill, the cardinal planned to enter Paris in force, his retinue clashing with those of the Montmorency on the streets of Paris in January 1565. Coming out the worse, the Cardinal and the young Henri Guise were forced to flee. Turning to the war of words the Guise proclaimed to Condė and the other princes that they were the protectors of men of true rank, against the upstart house of Montmorency.

==== Surprise of Meaux ====
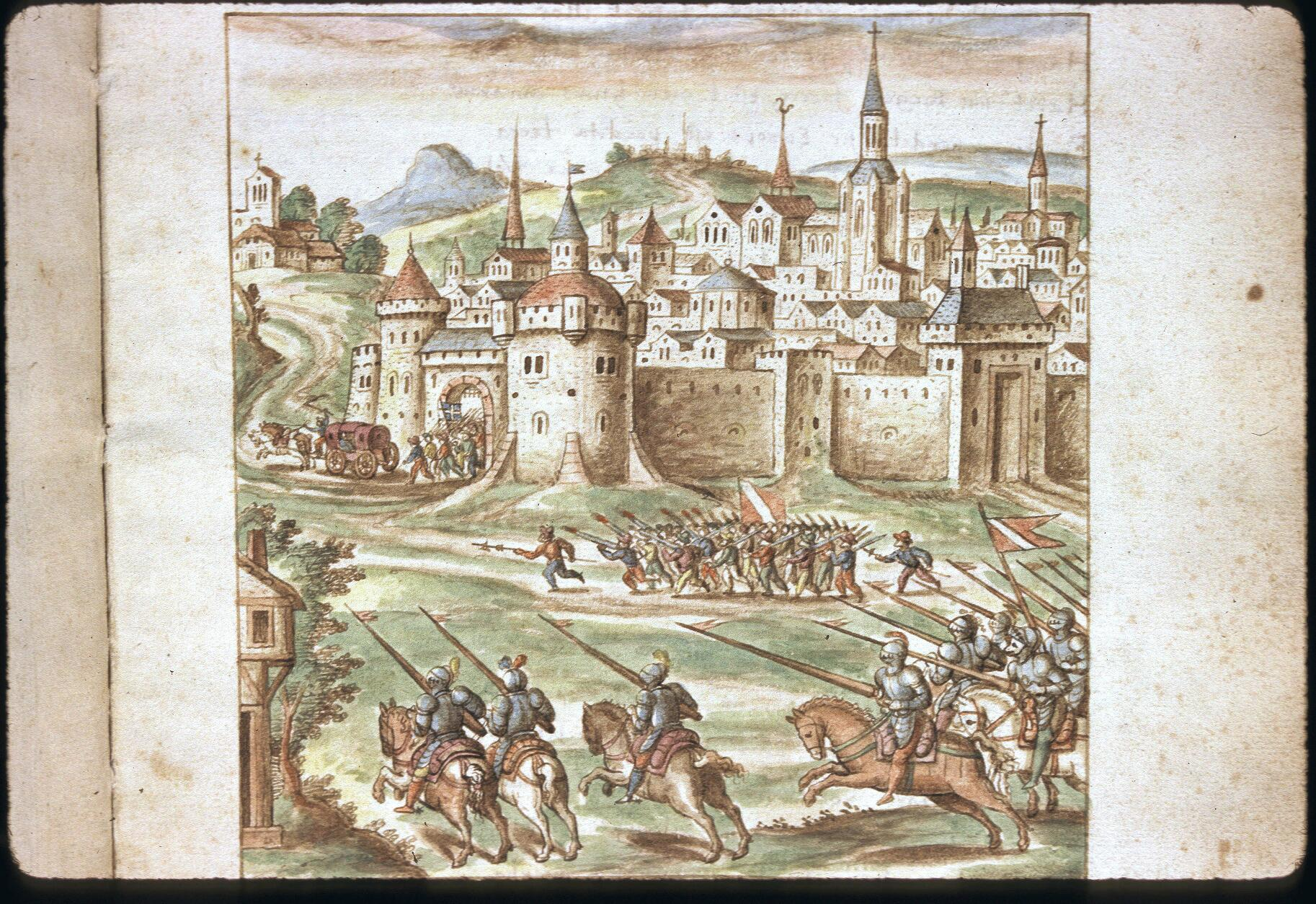
Condé and his cavalry seek to seize the king at the Surprise of Meaux.

Condé would, however, drift away from the Guise in the coming years, as they abandoned their non-religious approach and began championing the Catholic ultras in pursuit of their vendetta. In particular modifications to the Edict of Amboise which reduced its terms, and a meeting between Catherine and the Duke of Alba were met with disquiet by Condé and Coligny. When a further modification was made to the edict of Amboise in 1567, expanding the ban on Protestantism in Paris to the Île-de-France region, at the same time as Alba began marching north to the Netherlands, Condé got into a shouting match with the king, and then decided to withdraw from court. Writing from his estates he protested to Catherine about the hiring of Swiss mercenaries to protect France from Alba's troops, seeing them as a tool of Huguenot extermination. Catherine tried to reassure him and invite him back to court but he was uninterested.

Away from the centre of power, the leading Huguenot nobility began plotting what course of action to take, meeting at Coligny's chateau to discuss details. Condé, Coligny and the Count of Montgomery were in attendance among others. Eventually it was settled on to kidnap the king and the queen mother at Meaux, and assassinate members of the court who opposed them, specifically the Cardinal of Lorraine. The conspiracy was a better kept secret than that of Amboise, and when they struck on 28 September the court was caught off guard. It was able to recover, however, and quickly make for Paris; Condé, surprised by the speed of its withdrawal, gave pursuit with only 1/3 of the forces he had intended to assemble. He charged three times, but the phalanxes of Swiss mercenaries were able to repel him and the court made it to Paris.

=== Second civil war ===
==== Civil war ====
With their coup a failure, Condé and the other leading plotters decided to besiege Paris, hoping to starve the king out before the crown could assemble the full force of its army against them. Much as with the first civil war, they were aided by subsidiary risings across France, which took the cities of Orléans, Valence and Auxerre among others. Condé negotiated aggressively with those sent out to meet him, demanding a free exercise of religion, the expulsion of Italian financiers and the repeal of all taxes created since the time of Louis XII. The crown rejected these demands, and slowly began building up its forces, and seizing bridges. Misjudging his situation, Condé sent off subsidiary forces to take nearby towns, leaving his encirclement of Paris thin. This done, Montmorency struck out from Paris in November, besting Condé in the bloody battle of Saint-Denis though dying on the field himself. Condé withdrew from Paris, making his way east, conscious that his position was critical, but that the death of Montmorency had bought him some time while the royal army reorganised. Having successfully linked up with mercenaries and other Huguenot armies in the country, he turned back, and decided to besiege Chartres seeing it as a rich target to pay his restless troops. The siege dragged on, in part due to Condé's poor placement of the cannons, but before it could conclude, negotiations between the two sides brought a truce on 13 March. Peace was signed at Longjumeau on 23 March 1568.

==== Short peace ====
The Peace of Longjumeau largely represented a repeat of the terms agreed in Amboise several years prior. It would be uneasy, neither side holding much faith in its survival. The balance at court shifted from the moderates who had negotiated the peace, towards hardliners who desired its overturning. Meanwhile Condé and the Huguenot leadership disregarded the prohibition on foreign alliances, coming to terms with Protestant rebels in the Spanish Netherlands to aid each other against 'wicked counsel'.

By September Lorraine had a majority on the council for the overturning of the peace, eager to take up Pius V offer of financial assistance in return for a war on heresy. Condé, Coligny and the Huguenot leadership, having been warned of a plan to arrest them by Gaspard de Saulx, sieur de Tavannes, fled from the court southwards, making their way to the safe haven of La Rochelle where they took arms to defend themselves. On 28 September the Edict of Saint-Maur revoked Longjumeau and declared Catholicism the only religion of France. On 6 October the Duke of Anjou took the field.

=== Third civil war ===
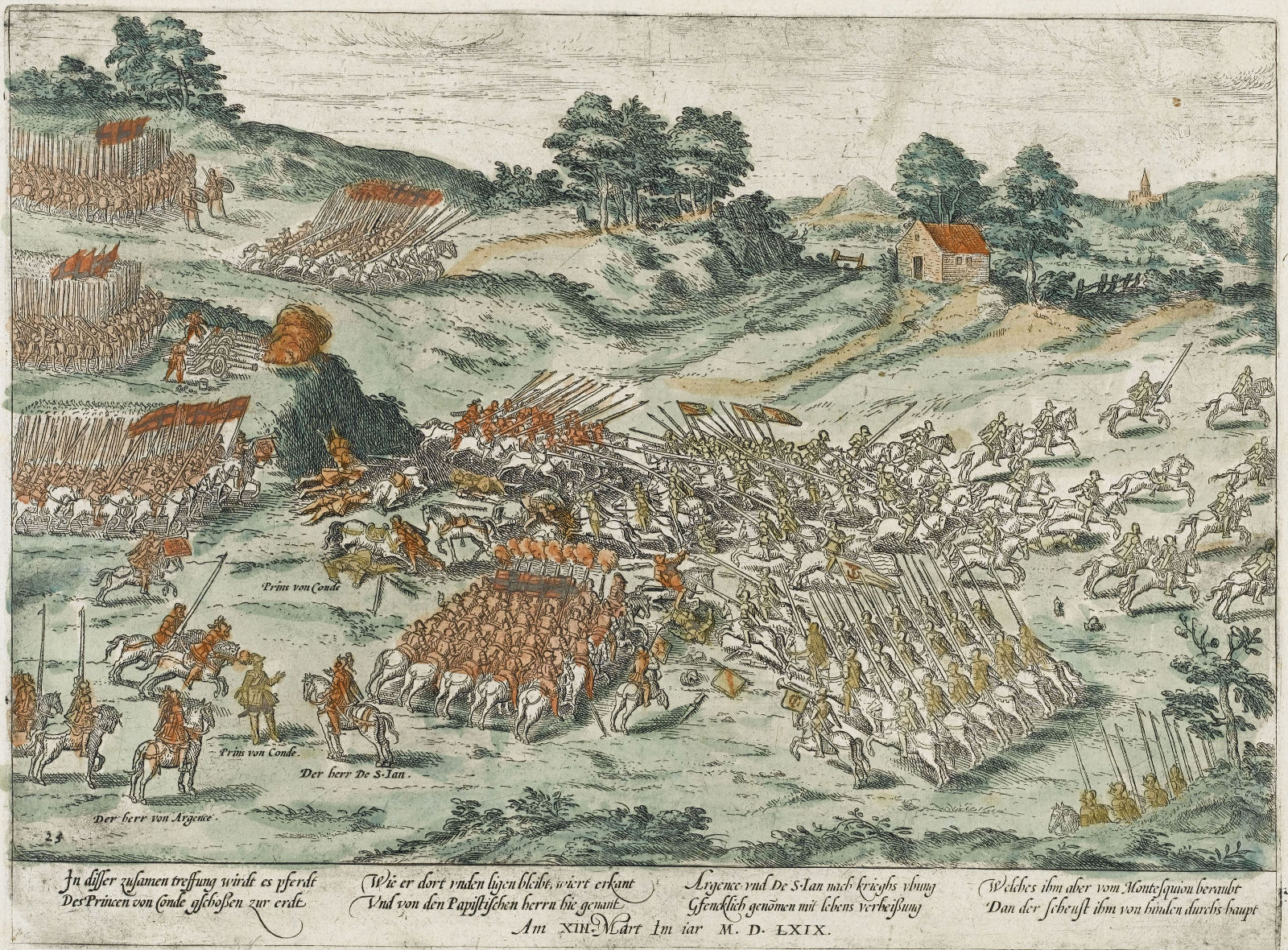
The Battle of Jarnac, the execution of Condé shown in the centre

Not having the benefit of uprisings in northern cities, Condé and Coligny would reorientate the axis of the third civil war to a defence of the Huguenot heartlands in the south. His forces, and those of Tavannes, circled Loudun in late 1568, seeking to find good ground to attack the other. Eventually the Crown's forces broke off to winter, and the Huguenot forces, after trying and failing to seize Saumur likewise settled into camp. In March 1569, hearing reports that Condé intended to lunge south and seize Cognac, Tavannes decided to take advantage, crossing the Charente on the night of 12 March, and coming upon the Huguenot rear. The royal vanguard, under Montpensier, fell upon the Huguenot rear-guard under Condé, and he was unhorsed. Though unarmed and under guard, there would be no gentlemanly capture for him this time and he was executed on the duke of Anjou's orders. While the majority of the Huguenot army got away unscathed, Condé's corpse would be paraded through Jarnac on the back of a donkey to the jeers of the populace.

== Marriage and children ==
Condé married in 1551, to Eléanor de Roucy de Roye (1536–1564), heiress of Charles de Roye. She brought as her dowry the château and small town of Conti-sur-Selles, southwest of Amiens, which would pass to their third son, progenitor of the princes de Conti. They had eight children:

1. Henri de Bourbon, Prince of Condé (29 December 1552 – 5 March 1588), became a Huguenot general and fought in the later wars of religion.
2. Marguerite de Bourbon (8 November 1556 – 7 October 1558), died young
3. Charles de Bourbon (3 November 1557 – 1 September 1558), died young
4. François de Bourbon, Prince of Conti, b. 19 August 1558
5. Charles de Bourbon, Cardinal, Archbishop of Rouen, b. 30 March 1562
6. Louis de Bourbon (30 March 1561 – 19 October 1563), died young
7. Madeleine de Bourbon (30 March 1562 – 7 October 1563), died young
8. Catherine de Bourbon (18 February 1564 – 5 May 1564), died young

On 8 November 1565, a widower, he married Françoise d'Orleans, Mademoiselle de Longueville. They had three children:

1. Charles de Bourbon, Count of Soissons, b. 3 Nov 1566, Nogent le Rotrou
2. Louis de Bourbon (7 August 1567 – 24 March 1569), died young
3. Benjamin de Bourbon (7 September 1569 – 2 March 1573), died young

He allegedly fathered a son by his mistress Isabelle de Limeuil, who served as maid of honour to Catherine de' Medici and was a member of her notorious group of female spies known at the French court as the "Flying Squadron". He vigorously denied paternity much to Isabelle's chagrin.

Coat of arms of Louis, Prince of Condé

== Depiction in media ==
Louis Condé is played by British actor Sean Teale in the TV show Reign. He has an affair with Mary, Queen of Scots and leads a coup against the monarchy.

== See also ==
- Bourbon family tree
- Château de Condé

== Sources ==
- Baird, Henry (1880). History of the Rise of the Huguenots Vol 1 of 2. Hodder & Stoughton.
- Benedict, Phillip (2003). Rouen during the Wars of Religion. Cambridge University Press.
- de Boislisle, A. (1902). "Trois Princes de Conde: A Chantilly". Annuaire-Bulletin de la Société de l'Histoire de France (in French). 39 (2).
- Carroll, Stuart (2009). Martyrs and Murderers: The Guise Family and the Making of Europe. Oxford University Press.
- Holt, Mack P. (1999). The French Wars of Religion, 1562-1629. Cambridge University Press.
- Knecht, R.J. (1989). The French Wars of Religion, 1559-1598. Longman.
- Knecht, R.J. (2000). The French Civil Wars. Pearson Education Limited.
- Knecht, R.J. (2010). The French Wars of Religion, 1559–1598. Routledge.
- Mullett, Michael (2010). Historical Dictionary of the Reformation and Counter-Reformation. Scarecrow Press.
- O'Brien de Clare, T J (2021). One Faith, One Law, One King: French Armies of the Wars of Religion 1562 - 1598. Helion.
- Potter, David (1995). Keen, Maurice (ed.). A History of France, 1460–1560: The Emergence of a Nation State. Macmillan.
- Potter, David (1997). The French Wars on Religion: Selected Documents. Palgrave Macmillan.
- Roelker, Nancy (1996). One King, One Faith: The Parlement of Pris and the Religious Reformations of the Sixteenth Century. University of California Press.
- Romier, Lucien (1924). Catholiques et Huguenots a la cour de Charles IX. Perrin et Cie.
- Salmon, J.H.M. (1975). Society in Crisis: France in the Sixteenth Century. Metheun & Co.
- Strage, Mark (1976). Women of Power: The Life and Times of Catherine de' Medici. Harcourt, Brace & Jovanovich. ISBN 9780151983704.
- Sutherland, Nicola (1962). "Calvinism and the Conspiracy of Amboise". History. 47 160.
- Sutherland, Nicola (1973). Bosher (ed.). French Government and Society, 1500-1850 Essays in Memory of Alfred Cobban. Athlone Press.
- Sutherland, Nicola (1984). Princes Politics and Religion 1547-1589. Hambledon Press.
- Thompson, James (1909). The Wars of Religion in France, 1559-1576: The Huguenots, Catherine de Medici and Philip II. Chicago University Press.
- Tucker, Spencer C., ed. (2010). "March 13, 1569:Battle of Jarnac". A Global Chronology of Conflict: From the Ancient World to the Modern Middle East. ABC-CLIO.
- Wood, James (2002). The Kings Army: Warfare, Soldiers and Society during the Wars of Religion in France, 1562-1576. Cambridge University Press.

Louis I, Prince of Condé House of Bourbon-Condé Cadet branch of the House of Bourbon Born: 7 May 1530 Died: 13 March 1569
French nobility
New title Dynasty founded	Prince of Condé; 1546 – 13 March 1569	Succeeded by Henri I de Bourbon
