= County of Longueville =

French noble title

Count of Longueville is a French noble title, whose holder had the fiefdom of the County of Longueville. The County was elevated into a Duchy in 1505.

Arms of the County of Longueville

== Origins ==
The Lordship of Longueville was a fief that belonged to the Giffard family. William Marshal received half of this honour by right of his wife, Isabel de Clare, daughter of Richard de Clare, 2nd Earl of Pembroke in 1191. The heir of the other half was Richard de Clare, 3rd Earl of Hertford. After 1204, William Marshal managed to keep his part, which in 1219 still belonged to his widow Isabel de Clare (Apr. 1172-1220) and her children in 1219. On the death of Isabelle de Clare, his son William Marshal, 2nd Earl of Pembroke gave his brother Richard his land in Normandy or the honours of Longueville and Orbec. Richard died childless, and Louis IX of France seized the lands.

== Changes ==
In 1305, the county was given by Philip IV to his minister Enguerrand de Marigny, only for him to forfeit the title in 1314. It belonged to the family of the Counts of Evreux until the death of Philip of Navarre, brother of Charles the Bad in 1363. On 27 May 1364, Charles V offered the county of Longueville to Bertrand du Guesclin. The title of Comte de Longueville was awarded to Archibald Douglas, Earl of Wigton (d.1438), and his son William Douglas, 6th Earl of Douglas (d.1440) in gratitude for the assistance to the future Charles VII of France by the Scottish army led by Archibald Douglas, 4th Earl of Douglas, killed at the Battle of Verneuil in 1424. Upon the death of James Douglas, 9th Earl of Douglas and 3rd Earl of Avondale in 1488, all his titles were forfeited and subsequently the title was bestowed upon Jean de Dunois. The title remained in the hands of the Orléans-Longueville family until the death of Jean Louis Charles d'Orléans in 1694.

== Separation and Return ==
In 1364, following the death of John II of France, the County of Tancarville was separated from the County of Longueville, while the city of Montivilliers was attached to the royal demesne. In 1505, the barony of Auffay was united to the county and subsequently, the Duchy of Longueville was created by King Louis XII of France for his first cousin once removed François d'Orléans, Count of Dunois, son of François d'Orléans, Count of Dunois, son of Jean d'Orléans, himself an illegitimate son of the Duke of Orléans. The title became extinct in 1694 following the death of Marie de Nemours. From 1648, Longueville was also Sovereign Prince of Neuchâtel, a Swiss territory. In 1654 the eighth duke was created a peer as Duke of Coulommiers but the peerage was never registered and so became extinct at his death.

== List of Lords and Counts ==
- Osbern de Bolbec
- Walter Giffard, Lord of Longueville
- Walter Giffard, 1st Earl of Buckingham
- Walter Giffard, 2nd Earl of Buckingham
- William Marshal, 1st Earl of Pembroke, husband of Isabel de Clare, daughter of Richard de Clare, 2nd Earl of Pembroke, himself great grandson to Rohese Giffard, daughter of Walter Giffard, Lord of Longueville.
- Richard Marshal, 3rd Earl of Pembroke
- Enguerrand de Marigny (c. 1260–30 April 1315), chamberlain and minister of King Philip IV, Count of Longueville from 1305 to 1314.
- Philippe de Navarre (1336–1363), Count of Longueville. Childless.
- Bertrand du Guesclin (1320–13 July 1380), constable of France and Castile, Count of Longueville from 1364 Chamberlain, France, Pontorson captain, captain of Mount St. Michael, king of Granada, Duke of Molina.
- Archibald Douglas, 5th Earl of Douglas († 26 June 1439), Count of Longueville, 2nd Duke of Touraine, the son of Archibald Douglas, 4th Earl of Douglas.
- William Douglas, 6th Earl of Douglas († 24 November 1440), Count of Longueville, son of the previous.
- Jean de Dunois (23 November 1402 – 24 November 1468), a French captain during the Hundred Years' War, comrade in arms of Joan of Arc, Count of Dunois, Count of Longueville from 1443, Baron de Gex, lord of Parthenay of Valbonais, Claix, Grand Chamberlain of France, President of the Council of Thirty-Six.
- Francis I d’Orléans (1447-1491) son of the preceding.
- Francis II d’Orléans (1478–1513) son of the preceding.
- Louis I d’Orléans (1480–1516) brother of the preceding.
- Claude d’Orléans (1508–1524) son of the preceding.
- Louis II d’Orléans (1510–1537) brother of the preceding.
- François III d’Orléans (1535–1551) son of the preceding.
- Léonor d’Orléans (1540–1573) first cousin of the preceding.
- Henri I d’Orléans (1568–1595) son of the preceding.
- Henri II d’Orléans (1595–1663) son of the preceding.
- Jean Louis Charles d’Orléans (1646–1668), son of the preceding. He resigned the title to his half-brother in 1668.
- Charles Paris d’Orléans (1668–1672) half-brother of the preceding. On his death the title went back to his half-brother.
- Jean Louis Charles d’Orléans (1672–1694).

== See also ==
- Duke of Longueville
