= Canton of Neuchâtel =

Canton of Switzerland

Republic and Canton of Neuchâtel République et Canton de Neuchâtel (French)
- Canton
- Flag Coat of arms
- Anthem: Hymne Neuchâtelois ("The Neuchâtelois anthem")
- Interactive map of Republic and Canton of Neuchâtel
- Coordinates: 46°59′N 6°47′E
- Country: Switzerland
- Capital: Neuchâtel
- Largest city: Neuchâtel
- Subdivisions: 24 municipalities

Government
  - President: Florence Nater
  - Executive: Conseil d'État (5)
  - Legislative: Grand Council (115)

Area
  - Total: 802.24 km^{2} (309.75 sq mi)

Population (December 2020)
  - Total: 175,894
  - Density: 219.25/km^{2} (567.86/sq mi)

GDP
  - Total: CHF 15.343 billion (2020)
  - Per capita: CHF 87,080 (2020)
- ISO 3166 code: CH-NE
- Highest point: 1,552 m (5,092 ft): Chasseral Ouest
- Lowest point: 429 m (1,407 ft): Lake Biel
- Joined: 1815
- Languages: French
- Website: www.ne.ch

The Republic and Canton of Neuchâtel is one of the 26 cantons of the Swiss Confederation. It is a mostly French-speaking canton in the western part of the country. In 2020, its population was 175,894. The capital is Neuchâtel.

== History ==
=== Principality of Neuchâtel ===
Neuchâtel has a unique history as the only part of present-day Switzerland to enter the Confederation as a principality (on 19 May 1815).

Its first recorded ruler, Rudolph III of Burgundy, mentioned Neuchâtel in his will in 1032. The dynasty of Ulrich count of Fenis (Hasenburg) took over the town and its territories in 1034. The dynasty prospered and, by 1373, all the lands now part of the canton belonged to the count. In 1405, the cities of Bern and Neuchâtel entered a union. The lands of Neuchâtel had passed to the Zähringen lords of Freiburg in the late 14th century as inheritance from the childless Elisabeth, Countess of Neuchâtel, to her nephews, and then in 1458 to margraves of Sausenburg who belonged to the House of Baden.

Their heiress, Johanna of Hachberg-Sausenberg (Jehanne de Hochberg), and her husband, Louis I d'Orléans, duc de Longueville, inherited it in 1504, after which the French house of Orléans-Longueville (Valois-Dunois). Neuchâtel's Swiss allies then occupied it from 1512 to 1529 before returning it to its widowed countess.

The French preacher Guillaume Farel brought the teachings of the Protestant Reformation to the area in 1530. Therefore, when the house of Orléans-Longueville became extinct with Marie d'Orléans-Longueville's death in 1707, Neuchâtel was Protestant, and looked to avoid passing to a Catholic ruler. The rightful heiress in primogeniture from Jeanne de Hachberg was Paule de Gondi, Duchess of Retz, who was Catholic. The people of Neuchâtel chose Princess Marie's successor from among fifteen claimants. (Note: The claimants were: 1. the King in Prussia; 2. the Duke of Württemberg-Montbéliard; 3. Jeanne de Mouchy, marquise de Mailly et de Nesle; 4. the marquis Yves d'Alègre; 5. Julianne Catherine d'Amont, dame de Sergis; 6. the Prince of Nassau-Siegen; 7. the Prince of Carignan; 8. Jacques de Matignon, comte de Torigny; 9. Paule-Françoise-Marguerite de Gondi, duchesse de Retz et de Lesdiguières; 10. Béat-Albert-Ignace, baron de Montjoie; 11. comte Trébonius-Ferdinand de Fürstemberg; 12. the Prince of Conti; 13. Angelique-Cunégonde de Montmorency-Luxembourg; 14. the Margrave of Baden-Durlach and; 15. the Canton of Uri.) They wanted their new prince first and foremost to be a Protestant, and also to be strong enough to protect their territory but based far enough away to leave them to their own devices. King Louis XIV of France actively promoted the many French pretenders to the title, but the Neuchâtelois people in the final decision in 1708 passed them over in favour of the Protestant King Frederick I of Prussia, who claimed his entitlement in a rather complicated fashion through the House of Orange and Nassau, who were not even descended from Jeanne de Hachberg.

Frederick I and his successors ruled the Principality of Neuchâtel (German: Fürstentum Neuenburg) in personal union with Prussia from 1708 until 1806 and again from 1814 until 1857. Napoleon Bonaparte deposed King Frederick William III of Prussia as prince of Neuchâtel and appointed instead his chief of staff Louis Alexandre Berthier. Starting in 1807, the principality provided Napoleon's Grande Armée with a battalion of rangers. The rangers were nicknamed Canaris (i.e. canaries) because of their yellow uniforms.

Rulers of Neuchâtel 1034–1848
Name	Reign
Ulrich I de Fenis	1034–1070
Mangold I	1070–1097
Mangold II	?–1144
Rudolph I	?–1148
Ulrich II	1148–1191
Rudolph II	1191–1196
Berthold I	1196–1259
Ulrich III	1191–1225
Berthold I	1159–1263
Rudolph III	1259–1263
Ulrich IV	1263-?
Henri	?-1283
Amadeus	1283–1288
Rudolph IV	1288–1343
Louis I	1343–1373
Elisabeth	1373–1395
Conrad IV of Freiburg	1395–1424
Jean de Fribourg	1424–1458
Rudolph IV of Hachberg-Sausenberg	1458–1487
Philip of Hachberg	1487–1503
Johanna of Hachberg	1504–1512
Swiss occupation	1512–1529
Johanna of Hachberg	1529–1543
François d'Orléans-Longueville	1543–1548
Léonor d'Orléans-Longueville	1548–1573
Henri I	1573–1595
Henri II	1595–1663
Jean Louis Charles	1663–1668
Charles Paris	1668–1672
Jean Louis Charles	1672–1694
Marie de Nemours	1694–1707
Frederick I	1707–1713
Frederick William I	1713–1740
Frederick II	1740–1786
Frederick William II	1786–1797
Frederick William III	1797–1806
Louis Alexandre Berthier	1806–1814
Frederick William III	1814–1840
Frederick William IV	1840–1848/57
Republic of Neuchâtel	1 March 1848

After the Liberation Wars the principality was restored to Frederick William III in 1814. The Conseil d'État (state council, i.e. government of Neuchâtel) addressed him in May 1814 requesting the permission to establish a special battalion, a Bataillon de Chasseurs, for the service of his majesty. Frederick William III then established by his "most-supreme cabinet order" (Allerhöchste Cabinets-Ordre, A.C.O.), issued in Paris on 19 May 1814, the Bataillon des Tirailleurs de la Garde following the same principles as with the Neuchâtel battalion within the Grande Armée. The Conseil d'Etat of Neuchâtel had the right of nomination for the battalion's officers. The commander was the battalion's only officer chosen by the monarch.

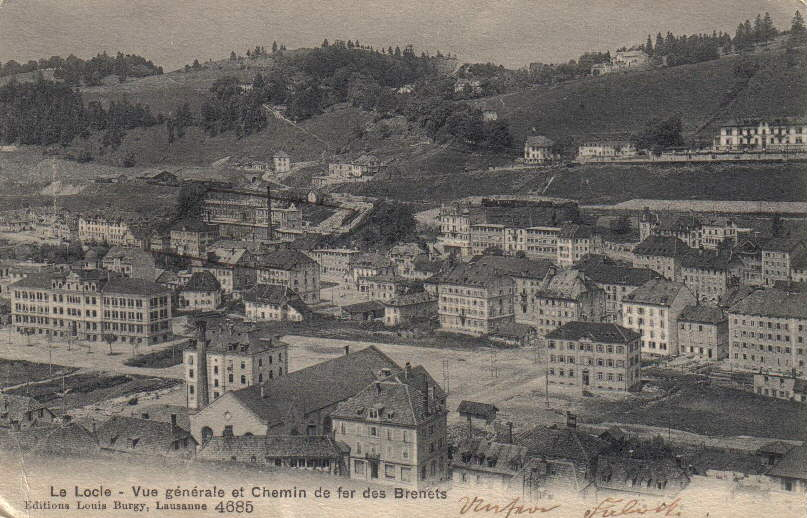
Le Locle, 1907

A year later he agreed to allow the principality to join the Swiss Confederation, then not yet an integrated federation, but a confederacy, as a full member. Thus Neuchâtel became the first and only monarchy to join the otherwise entirely republican Swiss cantons. This situation changed in 1848 when a peaceful revolution took place and established a republic, in the same year that the modern Swiss Confederation was transformed into a federation. King Frederick William IV of Prussia did not cede immediately, and several attempts at counter-revolution took place, culminating in the Neuchâtel Crisis of 1856–57. In 1857, Frederick William finally renounced the monarchy's claim on the area.

== Geography ==
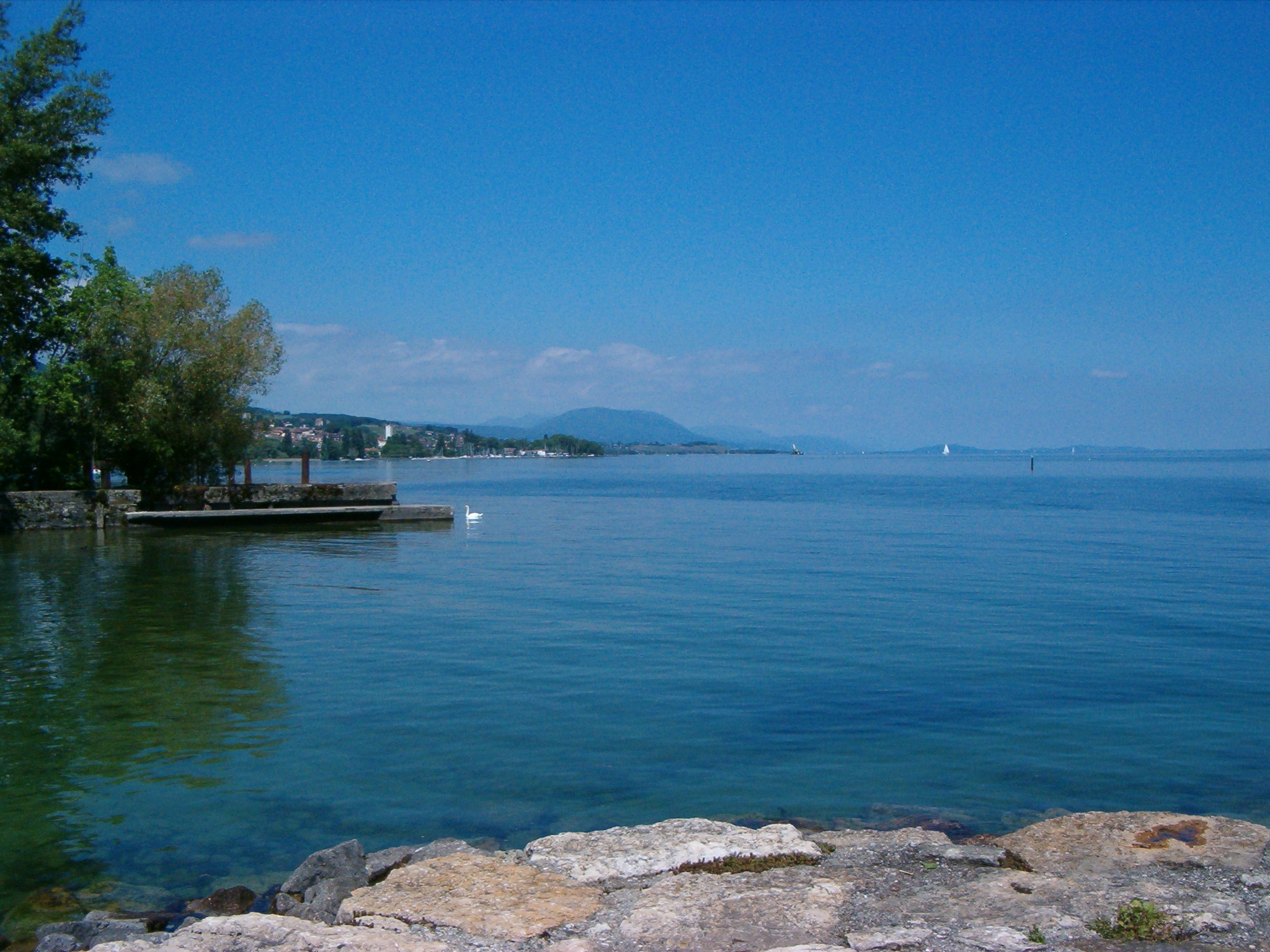
View of Lake Neuchâtel from the northern shore, port of Vaumarcus

The canton of Neuchâtel is located in Romandy, the French-speaking western part of Switzerland. It is also located in the Jura mountainous region. To its northeast it borders the canton of Bern, to the northwest France (Bourgogne-Franche-Comté). Lake Neuchâtel lies southeast of the canton, while the canton of Vaud is southwest of the canton of Neuchâtel. The canton lies in the central area of the Jura Mountains. Lake Neuchâtel drains the lands in the south, whilst the river Doubs drains the northern areas.

The canton is commonly divided into three regions. The viticultural region is located along the lake. Its name derives from the many vineyards found there. The region called Les Vallées lies further north. The two largest valleys of the canton of Neuchâtel lie in this region: the Ruz Valley and the Val de Travers. Both valleys lie at about 700 m (2,300 ft). The highest region of the canton, however, is the Neuchâtelois Mountains at 900 m (2,950 ft) to 1,065 m (3,494 ft). This region is made up of a long valley, home to La Chaux-de-Fonds, Le Locle and La Brévine.

== Government ==
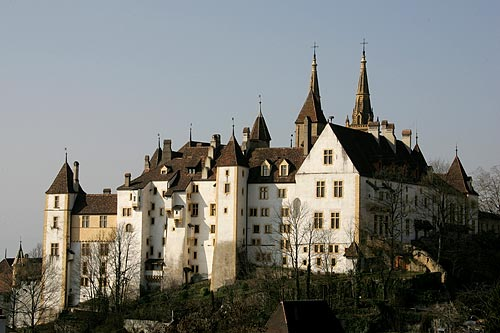
Neuchâtel Castle, now seat of the cantonal government

Neuchâtel was one of the first cantons in Switzerland to grant women the right to vote (1959) and also to grant the vote to foreigners holding a residence permit and who have been domiciled in the canton for at least five years (2002), as well as to lower the voting age to 18.

The legislature, the Grand Council of Neuchâtel, has 115 seats distributed in proportion to the population of the six districts that make up the electoral constituencies: Neuchâtel (35 seats), Boudry (25), Val-de-Travers (8), Val-de-Ruz (10), Le Locle (10), La Chaux-de-Fonds (27). The State Council (cantonal government), five "ministers" who assume the annual presidency in turn and manage the departments of justice, health and safety; finance and social welfare; public economy; regional management; education and culture. The cantonal authorities, which have their seat in the castle (the Château de Neuchâtel), are elected every four years by universal suffrage.

The people also elect their representatives to the federal parliament every four years: five of the 200 members of the National Council (lower chamber) and two of the 46 members of the Council of States (upper chamber).

== Politics ==
=== Federal election results ===
Percentage of the total vote per party in the canton in the National Council elections 1971–2015
Party	Ideology	1971	1975	1979	1983	1987	1991	1995	1999	2003	2007	2011	2015
FDP.The Liberals^{a}	Classical liberalism	24.3	22.4	20.6	19.4	20.4	22.5	25.7	20.5	14.8	12.7	26.9	24.4
CVP/PDC/PPD/PCD	Christian democracy	* ^{b}	*	*	*	*	*	*	*	*	3.3	3.5	3.6
SP/PS	Social democracy	30.6	38.9	37.4	33.1	30.8	29.8	28.2	28.0	29.2	25.9	24.7	23.7
SVP/UDC	Swiss nationalism	*	*	*	*	*	*	*	*	22.5	23.2	21.4	20.4
LPS/PLS	Swiss Liberal	16.0	22.1	26.4	30.9	30.0	27.1	25.2	24.0	14.4	13.2	^{c}	^{c}
EVP/PEV	Christian democracy	*	*	*	*	*	*	*	*	*	1.2	*	*
Ring of Independents	Social liberalism	*	*	4.8	3.5	*	*	*	*	*	*	*	*
GLP/PVL	Green liberalism	*	*	*	*	*	*	*	*	*	*	*	3.4
BDP/PBD	Conservatism	*	*	*	*	*	*	*	*	*	*	1.5	1.0
PdA/PST-POP/PC/PSL	Socialism	13.7	9.8	7.7	4.2	3.8	5.2	7.1	6.9	3.0	9.2	10.4	12.2
GPS/PES	Green politics	*	*	*	7.4	7.1	8.0	5.9	14.7	13.8	9.4	11.7	9.3
Solidarity	Anti-capitalism	*	*	*	*	*	*	*	2.7	2.2	*	*	*
SD/DS	National conservatism	*	*	*	*	3.4	6.4	2.5	2.3	*	*	*	*
Rep.	Right-wing populism	10.1	*	*	*	*	*	*	*	*	*	*	*
EDU/UDF	Christian right	*	*	*	*	*	*	2.3	*	*	*	*	*
Other		5.4	6.8	3.1	1.4	4.5	1.1	3.2	1.0	*	1.8	*	2.1
Turnout %		48.3	47.2	43.3	43.7	37.4	38.1	31.9	34.0	50.4	50.2	42.4	41.8

- ^a FDP before 2009, FDP.The Liberals after 2009
- ^b "*" indicates that the party was not on the ballot in this canton.
- ^c Part of the FDP for this election

== Political subdivisions ==
=== Districts ===
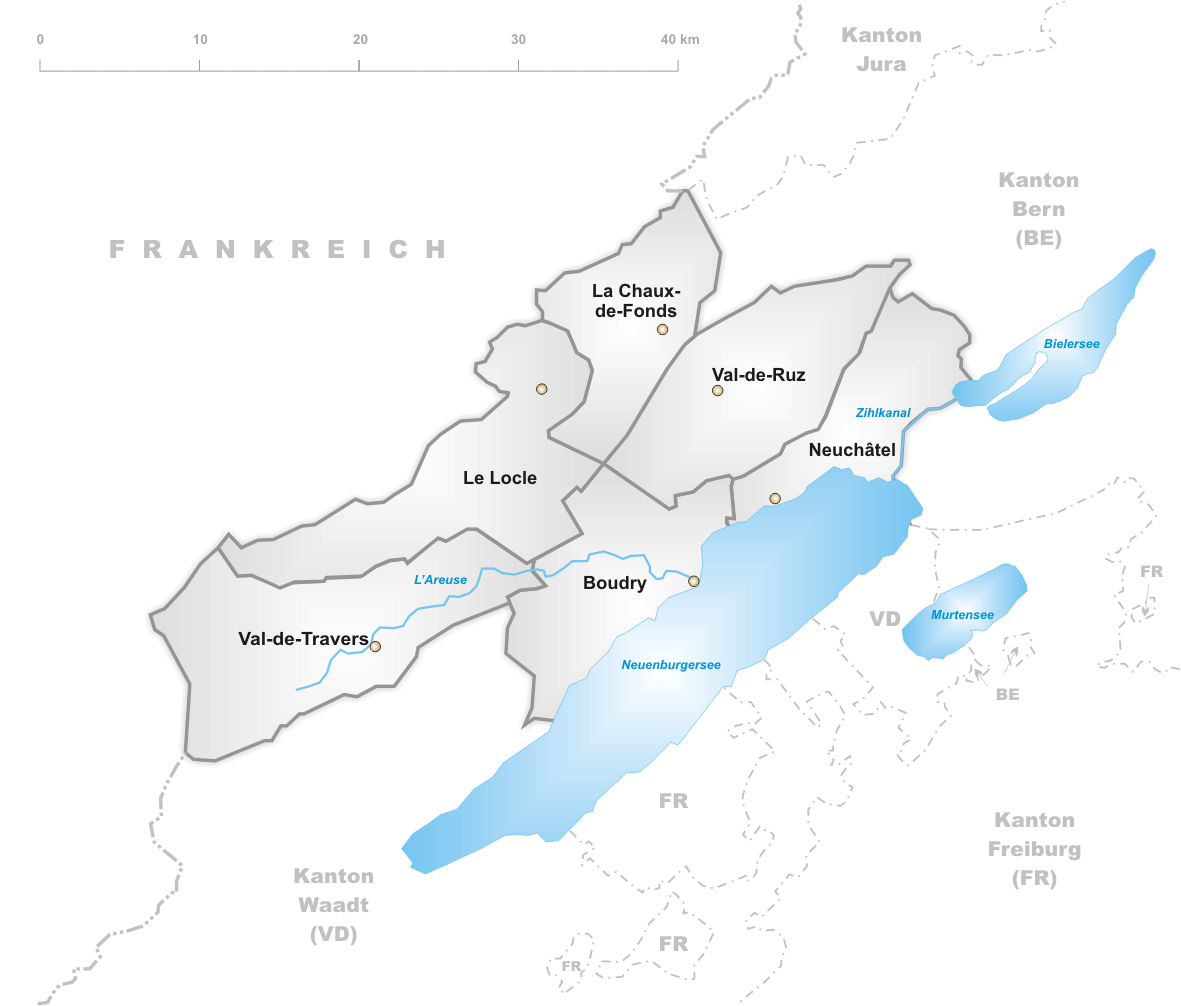
Districts of Canton Neuchâtel

Until 2018 the Canton was divided into six districts. On 1 January 2018 the districts were dissolved and all municipalities were placed directly under the canton.

- Boudry with capital Boudry
- La Chaux-de-Fonds with capital La Chaux-de-Fonds
- Le Locle with capital Le Locle
- Neuchâtel with capital Neuchâtel
- Val-de-Ruz with capital Cernier
- Val-de-Travers with capital Val-de-Travers

=== Municipalities ===
There are 24 municipalities in the canton (as of 2025).

== Demographics ==
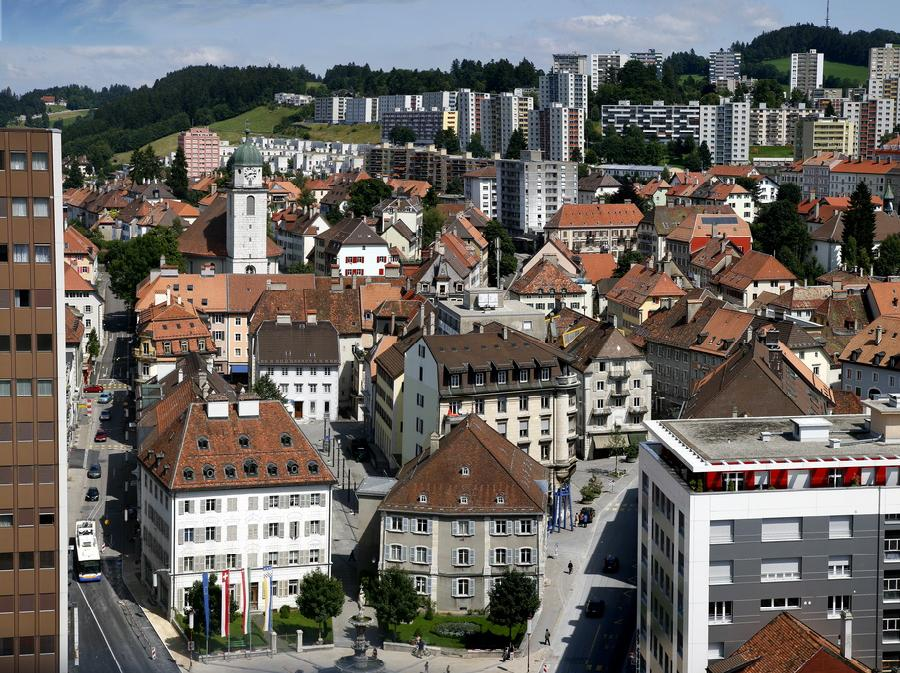
La Chaux-de-Fonds, most populous city in the canton

The population is almost entirely French-speaking. The canton has historically been strongly Protestant, but in recent decades it has received an influx of Roman Catholic arrivals, notably from Portugal and Italy. In 2000, its population was closely split between Protestants (38%) and Roman Catholics (31%).

The 175,894 inhabitants (as of 2020) are fairly evenly distributed with many small towns and villages lining the shore of the Lake of Neuchâtel. The average population density is 209 inhabitants per square kilometre (540/sq mi). Neuchâtel (2020 population: 33,455) is the canton's capital while La Chaux-de-Fonds (2020 population: 36,915) is the canton's largest settlement. Some 38,000 of the inhabitants, or a little less than a quarter of the population, are of foreign origin.

=== Historical population ===
The historical population is given in the following table:

Historic population
Year	Total population	Swiss	Non-Swiss	Population share of total country
1850	70,753	65,773	4 980	3.0%
1880	102,744	93,791	8,953	3.6%
1900	126,279	113,090	13,189	3.8%
1950	128,152	121,357	6,795	2.7%
1970	169,173	132,478	36,695	2.7%
2000	167,949	129,377	38,572	2.3%
2020	175,894			2.0%

== Economy ==
The canton is well known for its wines, which are grown along the Lake Neuchâtel shore, and for its absinthe. The Val-de-Travers is famous as the birthplace of absinthe, which has now been re-legalized both in Switzerland and globally. There are dairy farming and cattle breeding in the valleys, but it is for the breeding of horses that Neuchâtel has a fine reputation. Watchmaking is well-established in the canton, with fine mechanics and microchip production being established more recently. Higher educational institutions include Haute école Arc (representing Bern, Jura and Neuchâtel) and the University of Neuchâtel.
