= Constable of Normandy =

The Constable of Normandy was a high office of the Duchy of Normandy, who commanded the Duke of Normandy's army. In 1204, the King of France confiscated the Duchy of Normandy and subsumed it into the crown lands of France. Thereafter, the ducal title was held by several French princes.

== List of Constables of Normandy ==
- 1041 - Raoul de Gacé
- 1066 - Hagues II de Monfort
- 1107 - Robert de Montfort
- 1144 - Richard I du Hommet
- 1150 - Richard de La Haye
- 1180 - Guillaume du Hommet
- 1212-1252 - Guillaume III du Hommet
- 1252-1253 - Jean I du Hommet
- 1253-1272 - Jourdain III du Hommet
- 1272 - Robert de Mortemer
- 1277 - Guillaume de Mortemer
- 1283 - Guillaume Crespin
- 1283 - Guillaume du Bec-Crespin
- 1382 - Jean II de Melun
- 1382-1385 - Jean III de Melun
- 1385-1415 - Guillaume IV de Melun
- 1417-1423 - Jacques II d'Harcourt
- 1423-1487 - Guillaume d'Harcourt
- 1488-1491 - François I d'Orléans-Longueville
- 1491-1512 - François II d'Orléans-Longueville
- 1512-1516 - Louis I d'Orléans, duc de Longueville
- 1516-1524 - Claude d'Orléans-Longueville
- 1524-1537 - Louis II d'Orléans, Duke of Longueville
- 1537-1551 - François III d'Orléans, Duke of Longueville
- 1551-1573 - Léonor d'Orléans, duc de Longueville
- 1573-1595 - Henri I d'Orléans, duc de Longueville
- 1595-1663 - Henri II d'Orléans, Duke of Longueville
- 1663-1669 - Jean Louis Charles d'Orléans-Longueville
- 1669-1672 - Charles-Paris d'Orléans-Longueville
- 1726 - Charles I Frédéric de Montmorency-Luxembourg
- 1726-1764 - Charles II Frédéric de Montmorency-Luxembourg
- 1764-1799 - Anne Léon II de Montmorency-Fosseux
