= Duchess of Longueville =

== Countess of Longueville ==
=== House of Orléans-Longueville, 1443–1505 ===
Picture	Name	Father	Birth	Marriage	Became Countess	Ceased to be Countess	Death	Husband
	Marie of Harcourt, Lady of Parthenay	Jacques II, Baron of Montgomery (Harcourt)	-	26 October 1439	1443 title created	1 September 1464		John I
	Agnes of Savoy	Louis, Duke of Savoy (Savoy)	1446	2 July 1466	24 November 1468 husband's accession	25 November 1491 husband's death	15 March 1509	Francis I

== Duchess of Longueville ==
=== House of Orléans-Longueville, 1505–1694 ===
Picture	Name	Father	Birth	Marriage	Became Duchess	Ceased to be Duchess	Death	Husband
	Françoise d'Alençon	René, Duke of Alençon (Valois-Alençon)	1490	6 April 1505		12 February 1512 husband's death	14 September 1550	Francis II
	Joanna, Countess of Neuchâtel	Philipp, Margrave of Baden-Hochberg (Zähringen)	1480	3 November 1504	12 February 1512 husband's accession	1 August 1516 husband's death	21 September 1543	Louis I
	Marie de Guise	Claude, Duke of Guise (Guise)	22 November 1515	4 August 1534		9 June 1537 husband's death	11 June 1560	Louis II
	Marie, Duchess of Estouteville	Francis I, Duke of Estouteville (Bourbon)	30 May 1539	2 July 1563		7 August 1573 husband's death	7 April 1601	Eleonor
	Catherine Gonzaga	Louis Gonzaga, Duke of Nevers (Gonzaga-Nevers)	21 January 1568	1 March 1588		2 May 1595 husband's death	1 December 1629	Henry I
	Louise de Bourbon, Mademoiselle de Soissons	Charles de Bourbon, comte de Soissons (Bourbon-Soissons)	2 February 1603	10 April 1617		9 September 1637		Henry II
	Anne Geneviève de Bourbon	Henri de Bourbon, Prince of Condé (Bourbon-Condé)	27 August 1619	2 June 1642		11 May 1663 husband's death	15 April 1679	Henry II

== See also ==
- List of consorts of Neuchâtel
