= List of consorts of Neuchâtel =

This is a list of consorts of Neuchâtel, the capital of the Swiss canton of the same name.

== Countess of Neuchâtel ==
=== House of Zähringen, 1457–1543 ===
| Picture | Name | Father | Birth | Marriage | Became Countess | Ceased to be Countess | Death | Spouse |
|---|---|---|---|---|---|---|---|---|
| | Margaret of Vienne | William of Vienne | - | 1449 | 1457 husband's accession | 12 April 1487 husband's death | - | Rudolph IV |
| | Marie of Savoy | Amadeus IX, Duke of Savoy (Savoy) | 1455 | 1478 | 12 April 1487 husband's accession | 9 September 1503 husband's death | 1511 | Philipp |

== Princess of Neuchâtel ==
=== House of Orléans-Longueville, 1543–1707 ===
| Picture | Name | Father | Birth | Marriage | Became Princess | Ceased to be Princess | Death | Spouse |
|---|---|---|---|---|---|---|---|---|
| | Marie, Duchess of Estouteville | Francis I, Duke of Estouteville (Bourbon) | 30 May 1539 | 2 July 1563 | | 7 August 1573 husband's death | 7 April 1601 | Leonor |
| | Catherine Gonzaga | Louis Gonzaga, Duke of Nevers (Gonzaga) | 21 January 1568 | 1 March 1588 | | 2 May 1595 husband's death | 1 December 1629 | Henri I |
| | Louise de Bourbon, Mademoiselle de Soissons | Charles de Bourbon, comte de Soissons (Bourbon) | 2 February 1603 | 10 April 1617 | | 9 September 1637 | | Henri II |
| | Anne Geneviève de Bourbon | Henri de Bourbon, Prince of Condé (Bourbon) | 27 August 1619 | 2 June 1642 | | 11 May 1663 husband's death | 15 April 1679 | Henri II |

=== House of Hohenzollern, 1707–1806 ===
| Picture | Name | Father | Birth | Marriage | Became Princess | Ceased to be Princess | Death | Spouse |
|---|---|---|---|---|---|---|---|---|
| | Sophia Louise of Mecklenburg-Schwerin | Frederick, Duke of Mecklenburg-Grabow (Mecklenburg-Schwerin) | 6 May 1685 | 28 November 1708 | | 25 February 1713 husband's death | 29 July 1735 | Frederick I |
| | Sophia Dorothea of Hanover | George I of Great Britain (Hanover) | 16 March 1687 | 28 November 1706 | 25 February 1713 husband's accession | 31 May 1740 husband's death | 28 June 1757 | Frederick William I |
| | Elisabeth Christine of Brunswick-Bevern | Ferdinand Albert II, Duke of Brunswick-Lüneburg (Brunswick-Bevern) | 8 November 1715 | 12 June 1733 | 31 May 1740 husband's accession | 17 August 1786 husband's death | 13 January 1797 | Frederick II |
| | Frederika Louisa of Hesse-Darmstadt | Louis IX, Landgrave of Hesse-Darmstadt (Hesse-Darmstadt) | 16 October 1751 | 14 July 1769 | 17 August 1786 husband's accession | 16 November 1797 husband's death | 25 February 1805 | Frederick William II |
| | Louise of Mecklenburg-Strelitz | Charles II, Grand Duke of Mecklenburg-Strelitz (Mecklenburg-Strelitz) | 10 March 1776 | 24 December 1793 | 16 November 1797 husband's accession | 1806 husband's desposition | 9 July 1810 | Frederick William III |

=== House of Berthier, 1806–1814 ===
| Picture | Name | Father | Birth | Marriage | Became Princess | Ceased to be Princess | Death | Spouse |
|---|---|---|---|---|---|---|---|---|
| | Maria Elisabeth Franziska of Bavaria | Duke Wilhelm in Bavaria (Wittelsbach) | 5 May 1784 | 9 March 1808 | | 1814 husband's desposition | 1 June 1849 | Louis-Alexandre Berthier |

=== House of Hohenzollern, 1814–1857 ===
| Picture | Name | Father | Birth | Marriage | Became Princess | Ceased to be Princess | Death | Spouse |
|---|---|---|---|---|---|---|---|---|
| | Elisabeth Ludovika of Bavaria | Maximilian I Joseph of Bavaria (Wittelsbach) | 13 November 1801 | 29 November 1823 | 7 June 1840 husband's accession | 1857 husband's abdication | 14 December 1873 | Frederick William IV |

== See also ==
- List of Prussian consorts
- List of consorts of Brandenburg
- Duchess of Longueville
