= Catherine de Nevers =

French Duchess of Longueville (1568–1629)

- Born: Catherine de Gonzague; 21 January 1568; Nevers, France
- Died: 1 December 1629 (aged 61); Paris, France
- Occupation: Noblewoman
- Spouse: Henri I of Orléans-Longueville (1568–1595)
- Children: Henri II of Orléans-Longueville (1595–1663)
- Parents: Louis IV de Gonzague-Nevers (father); Henriette de Nevers (mother)

Catherine de Gonzague de Nevers (21 January 1568 – 1 December 1629), French Duchess of Longueville, was the wife of Henri I of Orléans-Longueville and took over as the regent of Neuchâtel (now part of Switzerland) for 11 years during her son's (the heir's) early years; from 1601 to 1613.

== Biography ==
Catherine was born in Nevers, France as the eldest daughter of Louis IV de Gonzague-Nevers (prince of Mantua and part of the influential Italian Gonzaga family) and the noblewoman Henriette de Nevers (Duchess of Nevers and Rethel). Catherine is sometimes referred to as Princess Catherine; Queen Caterine de Medicis of Italy was her godmother and gave the infant her name. During Catherine's lifetime she held several official titles, such as Caterine of Gonzague de Cleves, Duchess of Longueville and Toutville.

In 1588 at the Louvre Museum in Paris, Catherine married Henri I of Orléans-Longueville (1568–1595), with whom she had a son, Henri II of Orléans-Longueville (1595–1663). Henri II became heir to his father's fortunes when he died, which was the same year Henri II was born. In the child's early years, her mother-in-law Marie II de Saint-Pol (one of the many women named Marie de Bourbon) served as regent and after her death in 1601, Catherine assumed the regency of the county of Neuchâtel. When Henri II reached the age of 18 in 1613, he assumed the leadership from his mother.

She founded several churches and monasteries. The Council of State of Neuchâtel permitted Catherine to build a church there, which was consecrated on 2 December 1604.

In 1613, Catherine founded the Notre-Dame de Grace priory on the territory of Ville l'Évêque near Paris, and in 1615 she sought out a relative, Louise de Pierrevive, a novice at the abbey Saint-Avit-les-Guêpières in the Loire Valley, to assist in its foundation.

Catherine died at 61 in Paris on 1 December 1629 and was buried in the cloister of the Carmelite Monastery that she had founded.
