= Grand Chamberlain of France =

Important position within the French royal court during the Ancien Régime

Ornaments

The Grand Chamberlain of France (French: Grand Chambellan de France) was one of the Great Officers of the Crown of France, a member of the Maison du Roi ("King's Household"), and one of the Great Offices of the Maison du Roi during the Ancien Régime. It is similar in name, but should not be confused with, the office of Grand Chamberman of France (Grand Chambrier de France), although both positions could accurately be translated by the word chamberlain.

At its origin, the position of Grand Chamberlain entailed oversight of the king's chamber and his wardrobe, but in October 1545, the position absorbed the duties of the position of Grand Chambrier, which was suppressed by François I, and the Grand Chamberlain became responsible for signing charters and certain royal documents, assisting at the trial of peers, and recording the oaths of homage to the Crown, among other duties.

The Grand Chamberlain also played an important role during coronation: he ceremonially admitted the clerical peers to the room of the king, and fitted the king with boots, dalmatic, and mantle for coronation. In the protocol of the reign of Louis XIV, the Grand Chamberlain was in the second rank during ambassadorial receptions, he served the king at table, and, at the ceremony of the Levée or royal awakening, he presented the king with a shirt. The position played a key role in state affairs in the sixteenth century, but became merely honorific in the seventeenth and eighteenth centuries.

The political importance of the Grand Chamberlain stemmed from his having permanent access to the King's Chamber. His symbol of office was the keys to the royal apartments, which he always carried; in token of which, he was permitted to place two gold keys in saltire behind his coat of arms. He also was entitled to carry the banner of France. In rank, the position was between the Grand Maître de France and the Grand Écuyer. During a lit de justice, he sat at the king's feet.

In the first half of the 16th century, the position was always held by a member of the Orléans-Longueville family, then by the Duke of Guise, and finally – until the end of the monarchy – by a member of the La Tour d'Auvergne-Bouillon family.

== List of Grand Chamberlains of France ==
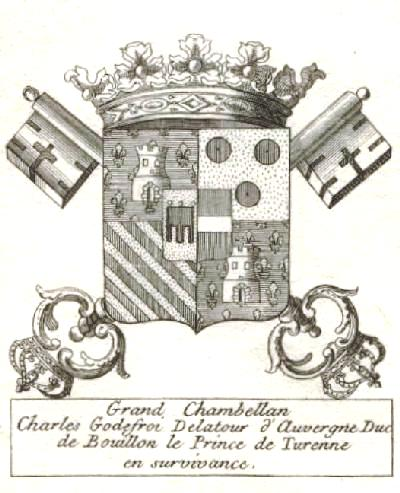
Grand Chambellan

- Renaud de Clermont (b. 1010, d. 1087; Served ?–1087, Reign of King Henry I of France)
- Gauthier de Villebéon (1196-1205)
- Gauthier II de Nemours (1205-1220)
- Philippe II de Nemours (1220-1222)
- Adam de Villebéon (1223-1238)
- Pierre de Nemours (1238-1270)
- Mathieu de Marly (1272-?)
- Pierre de La Broce (?–1278)
- Raoul of Clermont (1283–1302)
- Matthew IV of Montmorency (?–1304)
- Pierre de Chambly (?–1308)
- Mathieu II de Trie (?–?)
- Enguerrand de Marigny (?–1315)
- Jean I de Melun (1318–1350)
- Jean II de Melun (1350–1382)
- Jean III de Melun (1382–1385)
- Arnaud Amanieu, Lord of Albret (1385–1397)
- Jacques II de Bourbon (1397–1401)
- Guy IV de Damas de Couzan (1401–1407)
- Louis, Count of Vendôme (1407–1423)
- Jean II de Montmorency (1424–1427)
- Georges de la Trémoïlle (1427–1443)
- Jean Dunois, Count of Dunois and Longueville (1443–1468)
- Antoine de Châteauneuf (?–?)
- René II, Duke of Lorraine (1486–1486)
- François d'Orléans, Count of Dunois (1484–1491)
- Philippe de Hochberg, marquis de Hochbert, comte de Neufchâtel (1491–1492)
- Philippe de Crèvecœur d'Esquerdes, maréchal de France (1492–1494)
- Louis de Luxembourg, prince d'Altemure (1495–1503)
- François II, Duke of Longueville (1504–1513)
- Louis I d'Orléans, Duke of Longueville (1513–1516)
- Claude d'Orléans, Duke of Longueville (1519–1524)
- Louis II d'Orléans, Duke of Longueville (1524–1537)
- François III d'Orléans, Duke of Longueville (1537–1551)
- Francis, Duke of Guise (1551–1563)
- Charles of Lorraine, Duke of Mayenne (1563–1589)
- Henry I of Orléans, Duke of Longueville (1589–1595)
- Henry of Lorraine, Duke of Mayenne (1596–1621)
- Claude, Duke of Chevreuse (1621–1643)
- Louis, Duke of Joyeuse (1643–1654)
- Henry II, Duke of Guise (1655–1658)
- Godefroy-Maurice de La Tour d'Auvergne, duc de Bouillon (1658–1715)
  - Louis Charles de La Tour d'Auvergne (1682–1692)
- Emmanuel Théodose de La Tour d'Auvergne, duc de Bouillon (1715–1728)
  - Frédéric Maurice Casimir de La Tour d'Auvergne (1717–1723)
- Charles-Godefroy La Tour d'Auvergne, duc de Bouillon (1728–1747)
- Godefroy-Charles-Henri La Tour d'Auvergne, duc de Bouillon (1747–1775)
- Henri Louis Marie de Rohan, duc de Montbazon (1775–1790)
- French Revolution
- Charles-Maurice de Talleyrand-Périgord, prince de Talleyrand (1815–1830)

== See also ==
- Great Officers of the Crown of France
- Maison du Roi
- Gentleman of the bedchamber
- Alexandre Bontemps – Premier valet to Louis XIV
