= Municipalities of the canton of Neuchâtel =

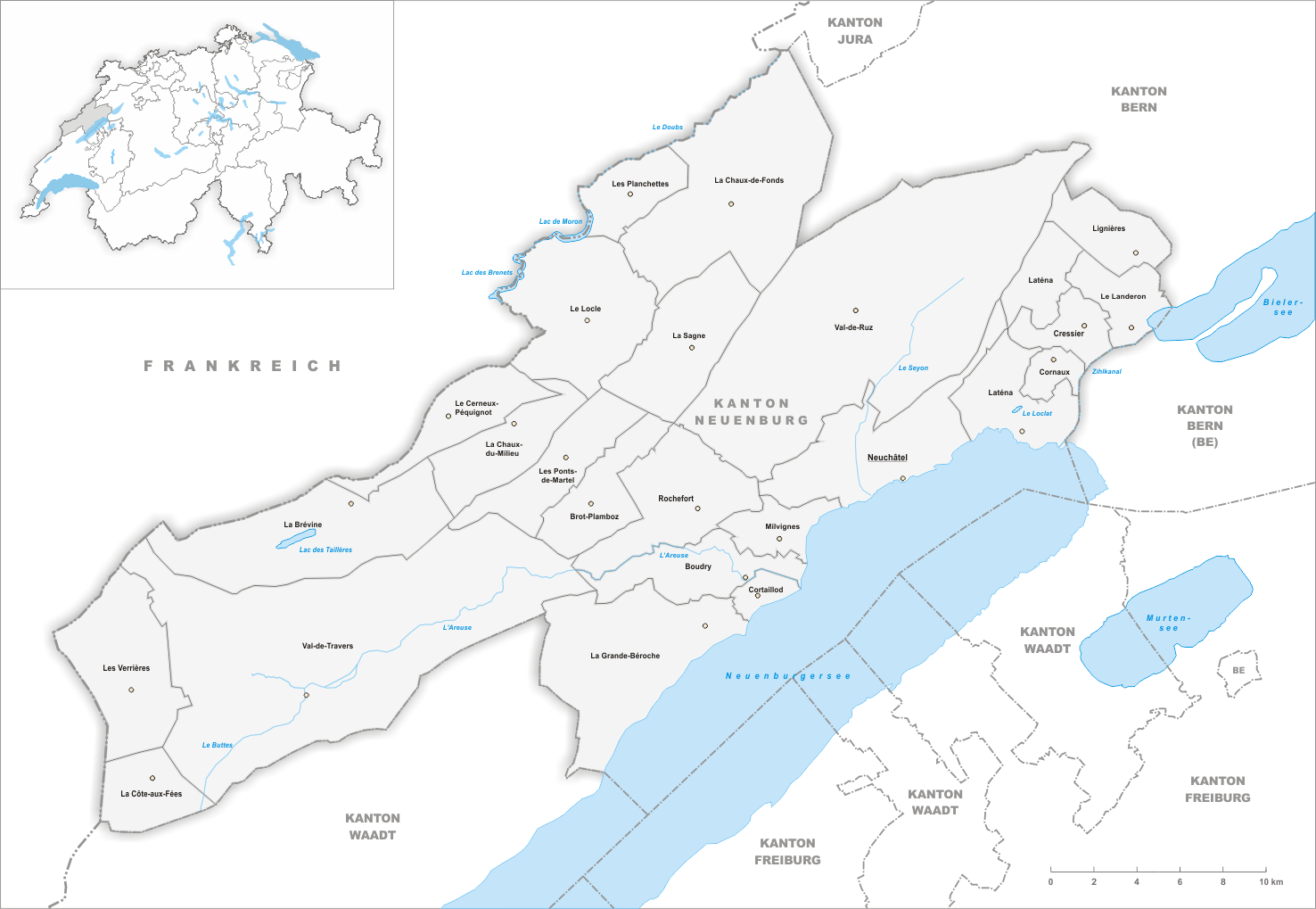
Municipalities in the canton of Neuchatel

The following are the 24 municipalities of the canton of Neuchâtel, as of 2025.

== List ==
- Boudry
- Brot-Plamboz
- Cornaux
- Cortaillod
- Cressier (NE)
- La Brévine
- La Chaux-de-Fonds
- La Chaux-du-Milieu
- La Côte-aux-Fées
- La Grande-Béroche
- La Sagne
- Laténa
- Le Cerneux-Péquignot
- Le Landeron
- Le Locle
- Les Planchettes
- Les Ponts-de-Martel
- Les Verrières
- Lignières
- Milvignes
- Neuchâtel
- Rochefort
- Val-de-Ruz
- Val-de-Travers
