= Hugh de Montfort, Lord of Montfort-sur-Risle =

Anglo-Norman nobleman

Hugh de Montfort
- Lord of Montfort-sur-Risle
- Born: Montfort-sur-Risle, Eure, Duchy of Normandy
- Died: c. 1088; England
- Spouse: 2
- Issue: 4
- Father: Hugh (I) the Bearded de Montfort-sur-Risle

Hugh de Montfort (Hugh II) (died 1088 or after) was a Norman nobleman. He was Lord of Montfort-sur-Risle, Constable of Normandy and a companion of William the Conqueror. Hugh's father was killed in combat with Valkelin de Ferrières in 1045.

The son of Hugh "the Bearded" de Montfort-sur-Risle, Montfort was an early ally of William, fighting in the Battle of Mortemer in 1054, a defeat for King Henry I of France. He participated in the Council of Lillebonne in January 1066 where the decision to invade England was made. In support of the actual invasion, Hugh provided 50 ships and 60 knights. In return, Hugh was installed at William's fortress at Winchester, and he received numerous holdings in Essex, Kent, Norfolk and Suffolk.

Hugh married first a daughter of Richard de Beaufour. They had one daughter:

- Alice de Montfort-sur-Risle, married to Gilbert de Gant, Lord of Folkingham, and so ancestors to a line of Earls of Lincoln.

Hugh and his second wife (name unknown) had three children:

- Robert I de Montfort-sur-Risle (d. before 1111), accused of treason in 1107
- Hugh de Montfort, Lord of Haughley (d. before 1100)
- Adeline de Montfort-sur-Risle, married William of Breteuil, eldest son of William FitzOsbern, 1st Earl of Hereford.

Hugh died in England sometime after 1088.

== Sources ==
- Douglas, David C., and Greenaway, George W. (Editors.) English Historical Documents 1042–1189, William of Poitiers: the Deeds of William, Duke of the Normans and King of the English, London, 1959
