= Jane Popincourt =

French noblewoman and tutor (c. 1484 – c. 1530)

Jane Popincourt (c. 1484 – c. 1530 CE) was a French noblewoman, tutor, and maid-of-honour. She served in the courts of Henry VII and Henry VIII of England.

For around twelve years, she had a position at the English court, first in the reign of Henry VII, as a distinguished tutor engaged to teach French to the princesses Margaret and Mary; and later in 1509, on the accession of Henry VIII, she was appointed a maid-of-honour to his wife, Catherine of Aragon. In 1514, there were rumors that Jane had become the King's mistress.

During the Battle of the Spurs in 1513, the King's troops captured a number of French nobles, notably Louis I d'Orléans, duke of Longueville. It is unknown if the Duke had met Jane at the French court, but as her countryman they seem to have been introduced upon his arrival at the English court and they soon began a liaison. Although he was technically a hostage, he was used as a supplementary ambassador in arranging the marriage of Mary Tudor and Louis XII, and was treated with respect as such. This damaged the reputation of Jane, who was probably then in her mid-to-late twenties, an age by which a woman would have been expected to be married. When the Duke returned to France in 1514, Jane remained at the English court and, some rumours suggested, may have begun a brief affair with Henry VIII. However, she seems to have wanted to return home. It has also been speculated that she was no longer welcome at the English court. She was listed as an attendant to Henry's sister, Princess Mary, who was about to become the queen of France. Louis XII refused to accept Jane as an attendant for his new wife, however, apparently on the grounds of believing Jane was promiscuous.

Jane remained in England until 1516, when she returned to France. She is said to have reignited her affair with the Duke and received a parting gift of £100 from Henry.
