= Jacqueline de Rohan, Marquise de Rothelin =

French court official and aristocrat (c. 1520–1587)

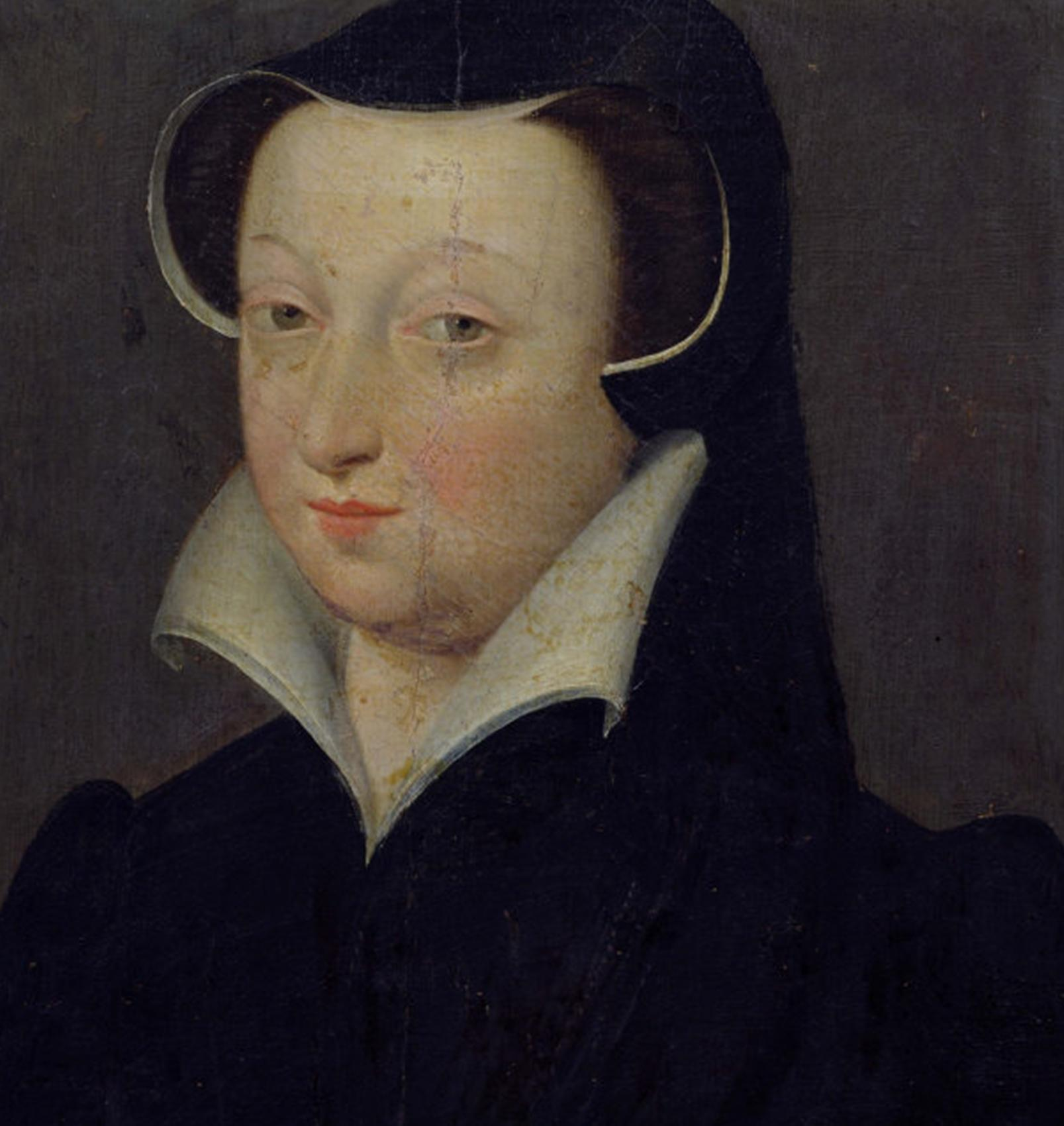
- Portrait by François Clouet
- Born: c. 1520
- Died: 1587
- Noble family: House of Rohan
- Spouse: François of Orléans-Longueville
- Issue: Leonor, Duke de Longueville; Françoise d'Orléans-Longueville
- Father: Charles de Rohan
- Mother: Jeanne de Saint-Severin

Jacqueline de Rohan, Marquise de Rothelin (c. 1520–1587) was a French court official and aristocrat. She was the daughter of Charles de Rohan and Jeanne de Saint-Severin, and regent of the Neufchâtel and of Valangin during the minority of her son Leonor, Duke de Longueville, Duke d' Estouteville.

== Biography ==
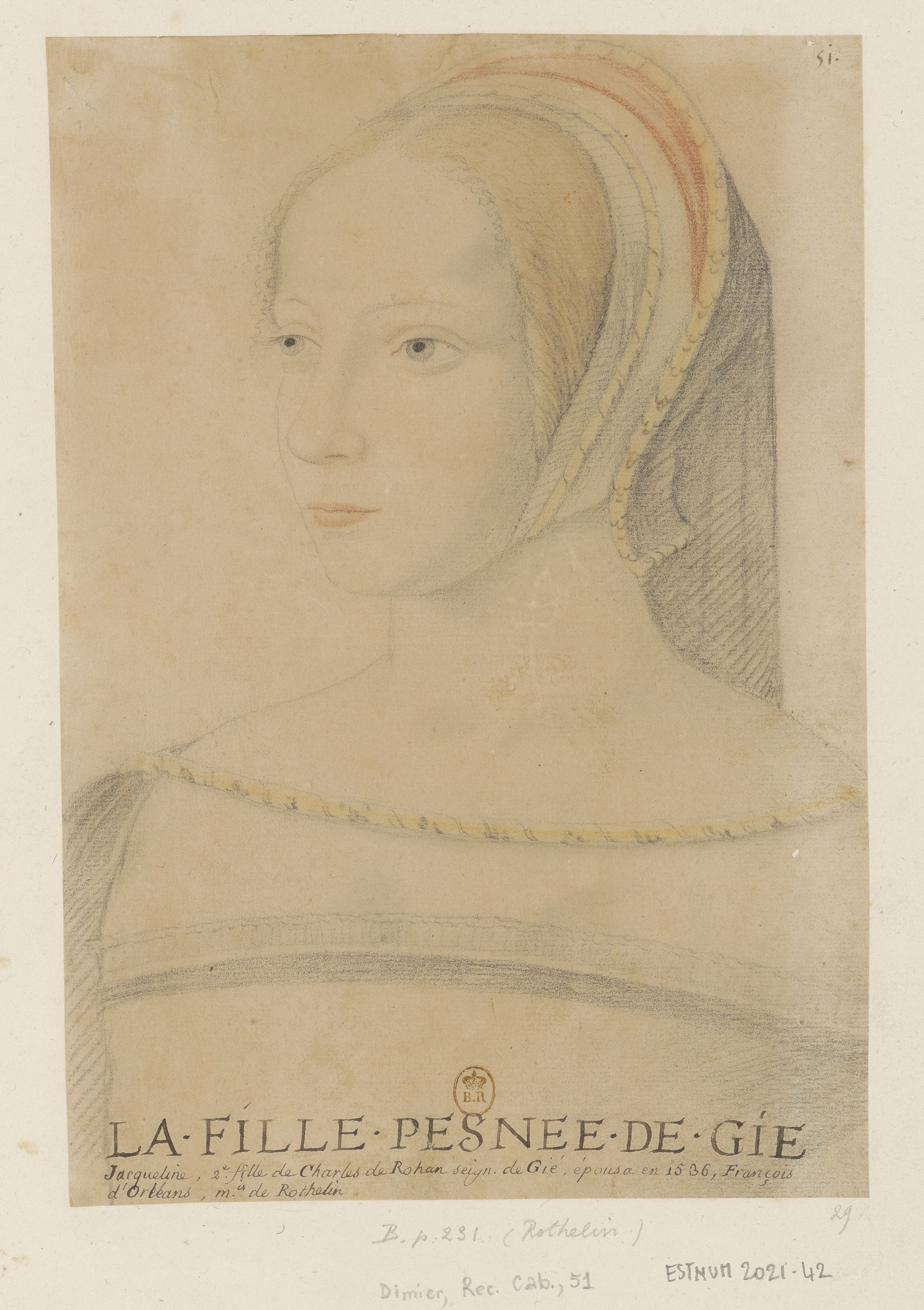

Jacqueline was the daughter of Charles de Rohan and Jeanne de Saint-Severin. She served as lady-in-waiting to both Eleanor of Austria (fille d'honneur 1531-1536 and Dame d'honneur 1538-1543) and Catherine de Medici.

Jacqueline's husband, Francois of Orleans-Longueville, Marquis de Rothelin, died on 25 October 1548, and in watching her son Leonor's interests in Neuchâtel she was brought into contact with the reformers in Switzerland. She then embraced Protestantism and turned her château at Blandy, in Brie, into a refuge for Huguenots. In 1567 she underwent a term of imprisonment at the Louvre for harbouring Protestants.

== Marriage and children ==
On 19 June 1536, at Lyon, Jacqueline married François of Orléans-Longueville, Marquis de Rothelin, Prince of Chalet-Aillon, Viscount of Melun (2 March 1513 – 25 October 1548), son of Louis I d'Orléans, duc de Longueville, Duke of Neufchatel and Johanna of Baden-Hochberg, Countess of Neufchatel and Margravine of Rothelin, with whom she had:

1. Leonor, Duke de Longueville, Duke d' Estouteville, Prince of the Blood (1540–1573), married in 1563, Marie d'Estouteville
2. Françoise d'Orléans-Longueville (5 April 1549 – 11 June 1601), who was born posthumously. On 8 November 1565, she married Huguenot leader Louis I de Bourbon, Prince de Condé, as his second wife, by whom she had issue.

== Sources ==
- Barbier, Jean Paul (2002). Ma Bibliotheque Poetique (in French). Librairie Droz S.A.
- Carroll, Stuart (1998). Noble Power During the French Wars of Religion: The Guise Affinity and the Catholic Cause in Normandy. Cambridge University Press.
- Labourdette, Jean-François (2018). Charles IX, un roi dans la tourmente des guerres civiles (1560-1574) (in French). Honoré Champion éditeur. ISBN 9782745349286.
- Vester, Matthew (2012). Renaissance dynasticism and apanage politics : Jacques de Savoie-Nemours, 1531-1585. Truman State University Press.
