= Marie de Nemours =

- Duchess of Nemours
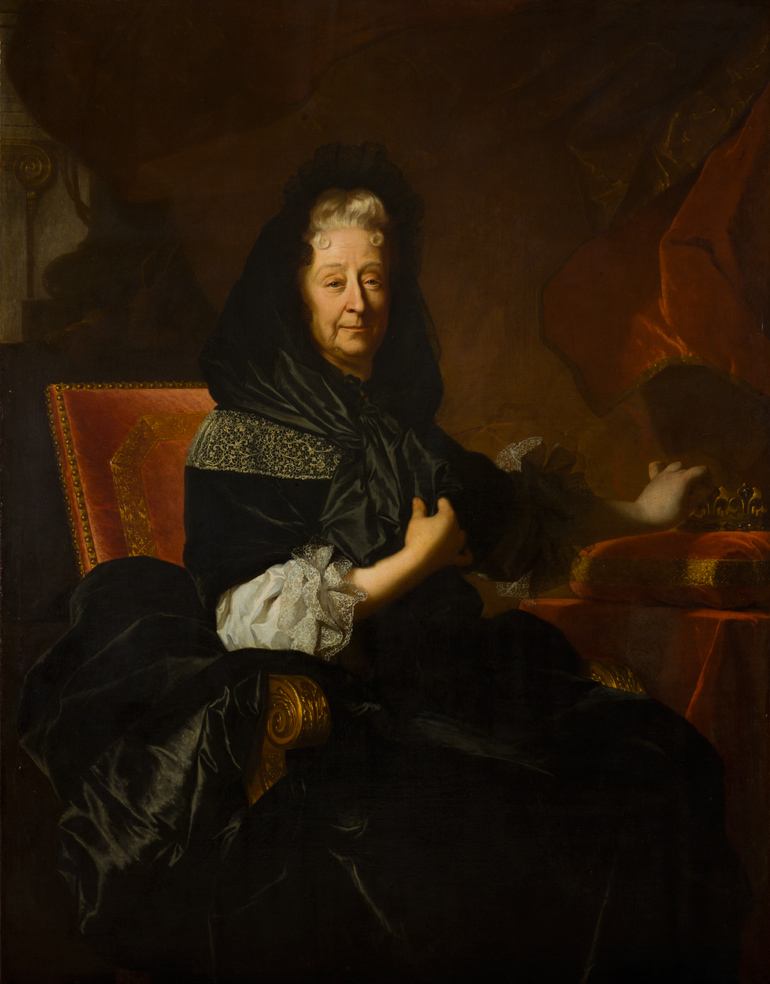
- Portrait by Hyacinthe Rigaud, 1705
- Born: 5 March 1625; Paris, France
- Died: 16 June 1707 (aged 82); Paris, France
- Spouse: Henri II of Savoy, Duke of Nemours
Names
- Marie d'Orléans
- Father: Henri II d'Orléans, Duke of Longueville
- Mother: Louise de Bourbon-Estouteville

Marie de Nemours, originally known as Marie d'Orléans-Longueville (1625–1707), was the reigning Princess of Neuchâtel from 1694 to 1707. After the death of her brother Jean Louis Charles d'Orléans, Duke of Longueville in 1694 she succeeded him as sovereign Princess of Neuchâtel, although she remained a prominent member of the French royal court. From her reign to her death she was the last living member of the House of Valois through a cadet line.

== Biography ==
de Nemours was the daughter of Henri II d'Orléans, duc de Longueville and his first wife, Louise de Bourbon. At an early age she was involved in the first Fronde, of which her father and stepmother, Anne Geneviève de Bourbon, were leaders. She married Henri II, Duke of Nemours in 1657. When he died in 1659, leaving her childless, the rest of her life was mainly spent in contesting her inheritance with her stepmother. Her Savoyard nieces included Marie Jeanne, Duchess of Savoy and Marie Françoise, Queen of Portugal.

The Dukes of Longueville had acquired the principality of Neuchâtel through marriage to Johanna of Hachberg-Sausenberg. After the death of her brother Jean-Louis-Charles d'Orléans in 1694, she succeeded him as Princess of Neuchâtel.

== Legacy ==
de Nemours left some memoirs, published by C. B. Petitot in the Collection complete des memoires (1819–1829).

de Nemours was the muse for Jean Loret's Muse historique (1650, 1660, 1665), a collection of weekly gazette burlesque reporting on the news of Paris society and the court of Louis XIV in the form of letters to Marie d'Orléans-Longueville which are considered an early example of French journalism.

de Nemours died on 16 June 1707, aged 82. Without children or close relatives, her death opened a conflict about her inheritance.

Marie de Nemours Orléans-Longueville Cadet branch of the House of Valois Born: 1625 Died: 16 June 1707
Regnal titles
Preceded by John Louis Charles	Princess of Neuchâtel; 1694 — 1707	Succeeded by Frederick I
