= Jean d'Orléans =

Jean d'Orléans may refer to:

- Jean de Dunois
- Jean, Count of Paris
