= François III d'Orléans, Duke of Longueville =

French nobleman

François III de Longueville (1535–1551) was the eldest son of Louis II d'Orléans, Duke of Longueville and Marie de Guise. He succeeded his father, who died on 9 June 1537, to the duchy of Longueville.

== Life ==
François was born on 30 October 1535. His mother, Marie de Guise, was from the powerful House of Guise. His father, Louis, was the son of Louis I d'Orleans, Duke of Longueville.

Following his father's death and his mother's marriage to James V of Scotland, François' care was entrusted to his grandmother, Antoinette de Bourbon. François kept correspondence with his mother, sending her a piece of string to show how tall he was, and his portrait. James V's daughter, probably Lady Jean Stewart, sent him a gold chain and he sent her another, with blue and green enamelled gold beads

After receiving a letters brought by Henri Cleutin and probably news of the Scottish defeat at the battle of Pinkie, François wrote to Mary, Queen of Scots, from the Palace of Fontainebleau on 12 January 1548. He mentioned his exercises wearing armour and running at the ring. He hoped that by learning these martial skills he would be able to help her against her enemies.

By 1550 François was ill. His mother had returned to France as part of the betrothal of his half-sister Mary to Francis, Dauphin of France. She tended him through what would be his final illness. François died shortly before his mother returned to Scotland.

== Sources ==
- Potter, David (1995). A History of France, 1460-1560: The Emergence of a Nation State. St. Martin's Press.
- Wood, Marguerite, ed., Balcarres Papers, vol. 1 (Edinburgh: SHS, 1923).

== External list ==
- Liste des ducs de Longueville

François III d'Orléans, Duke of Longueville House of Orléans-Longueville Cadet branch of the House of Valois Born: 1535 Died: 1551
French nobility
Preceded by Louis II	Duke of Longueville; 1537–1551	Succeeded by Léonor
Preceded by Johanna	Sovereign Count of Neuchâtel; 1543–1551	Succeeded by Léonor
