= Elisabeth, Countess of Neuchâtel =

Elisabeth, Countess of Neuchâtel or Isabelle de Neuchâtel (died 25 December 1395) was ruling countess suo jure of the County of Neuchâtel from 1373 until 1395. She was the daughter of Louis I of Neuchâtel and Jeanne de Montfaucon and married Rodolphe IV de Nidau.
