= Charles Paris d'Orléans, Duke of Longueville =

Duke, prince, count, and elected candidate for the Polish throne (1649–1672)

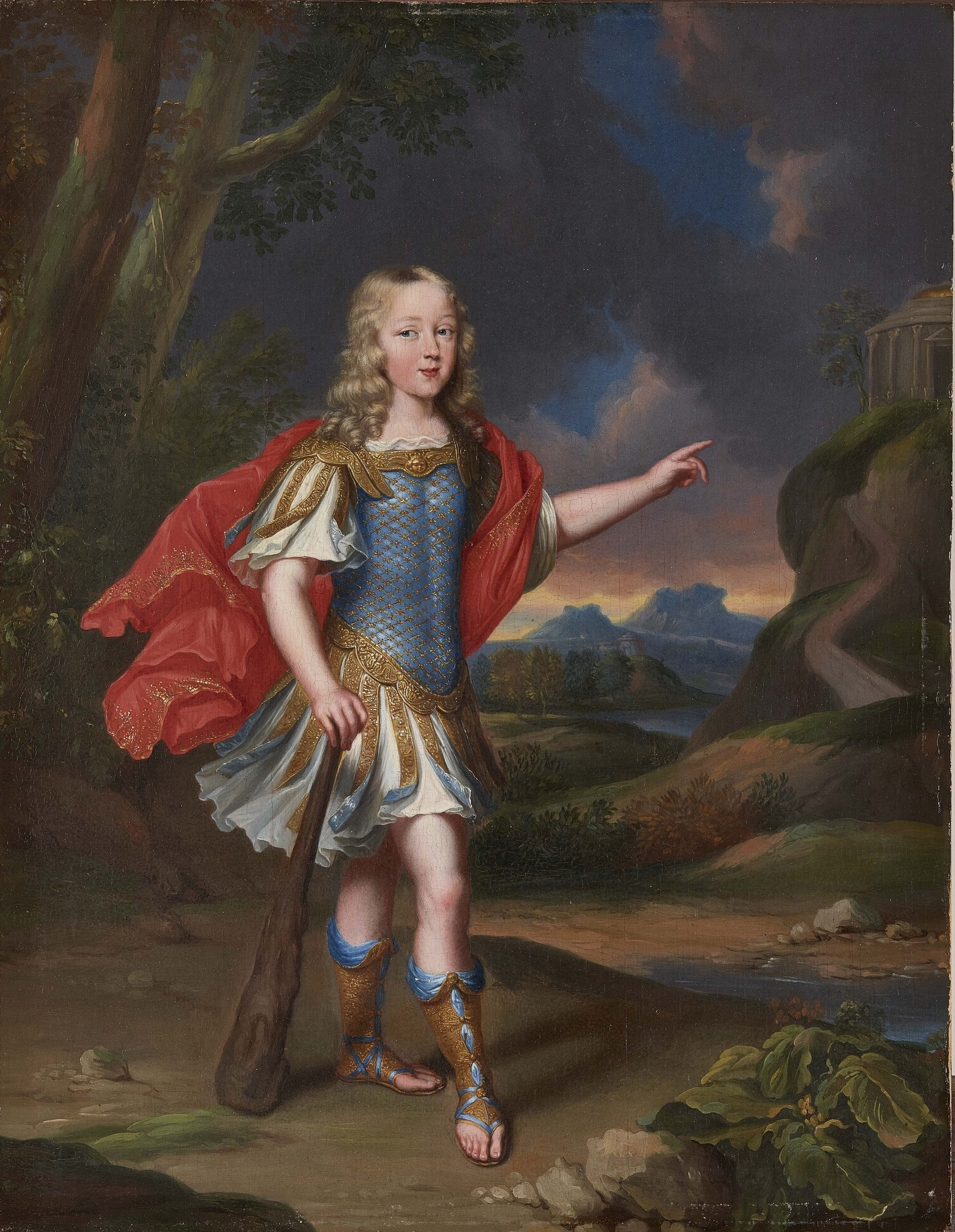
Portrait as Hercules by Louis Ferdinand Elle the Elder, 1658-1660

Charles Paris d'Orléans, (Paris, 28 January 1649 – Tolhuis, Netherlands, 12 June 1672) was Duke of Longueville, Duke of Estouteville, Prince of Neuchâtel, Count of Dunois, Count of Saint-Pol, Count of Tancarville and a military commander.

== Biography ==
Charles Paris of Longueville was officially the child of Duke Henry II of Longueville, but was probably a natural child of Henry's second wife, Anne Geneviève de Bourbon and the French writer, Duke François de La Rochefoucauld, with whom his mother had an affair before his birth. When his elder (half-)brother Jean-Louis d'Orléans joined the Jesuits in 1668, Charles inherited the titles of Duke of Longueville and Count of Saint-Pol as the second son.

Charles Paris of Longueville participated in the War of Devolution in Flanders and Franche-Comté, and by the end of 1668 in the unsuccessful attempt to lift the Siege of Candia against the Turks.

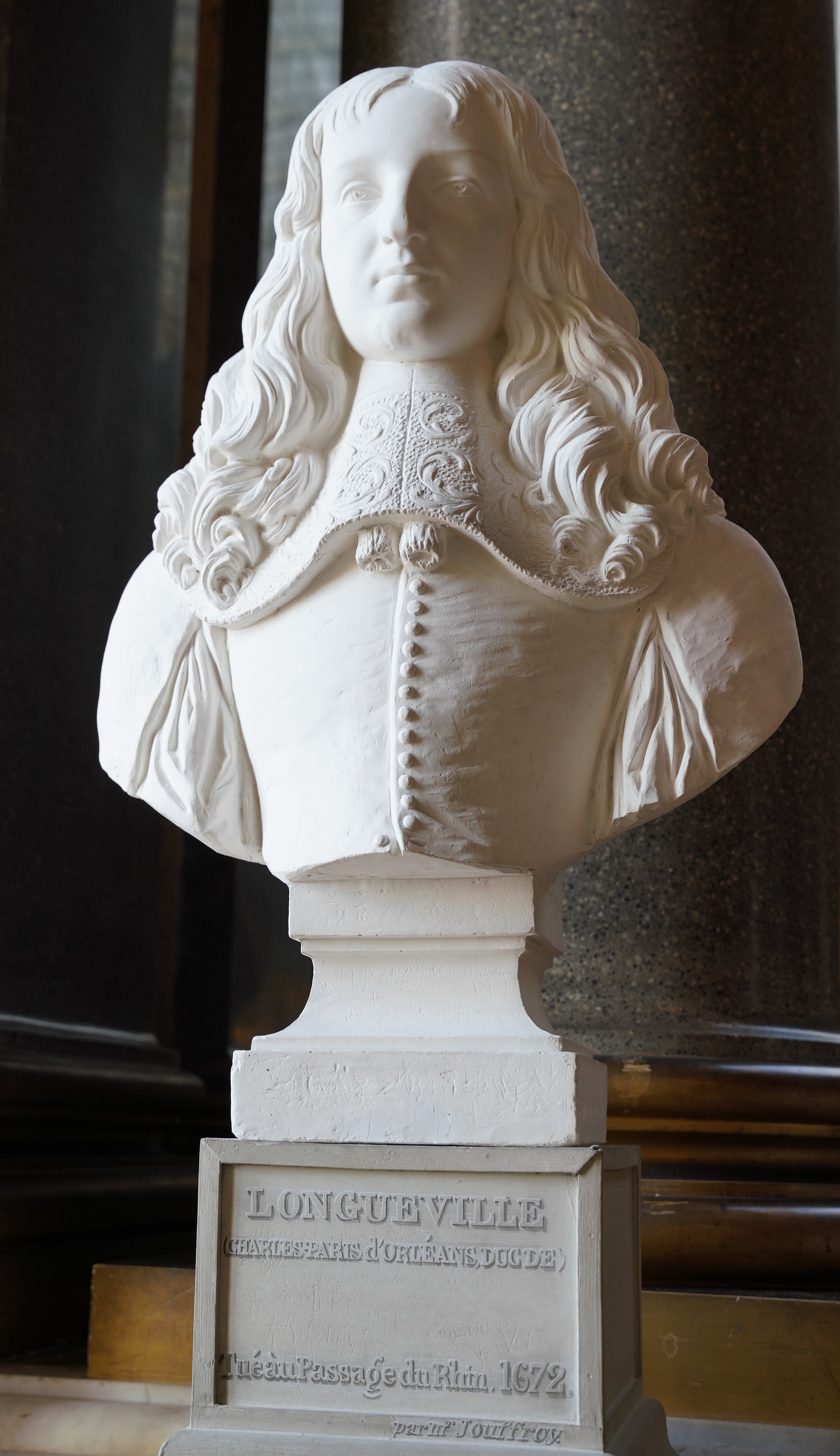
Bust by François Jouffroy in the Galerie des Batailles

At the start of the Dutch campaign in 1672, he was part of the French cavalry, which crossed the Rhine at Elten in order to invade the Netherlands from there. On Sunday 12 June, on the left side of the river, near Tolhuis, some Dutch Frisian officers were surrendering, but Charles Paris shot down one of them without a cause. This irresponsible act led to a firefight with the Frisian prisoners, apparently not yet fully disarmed, in which Charles Paris, as the instigator of the event, was killed. Twenty senior officers on the French side were also killed in this exchange of fire, as were an unknown number of Frisian prisoners of war. The French commander-in-chief, his uncle the Prince of Condé was so badly wounded that he had to hand over command to Turenne.

Although unmarried, Charles of Longueville had in 1670 a bastard son with Madeleine d'Angennes, wife of Marshal Henri de La Ferté-Senneterre. This son, Charles-Louis d'Orléans, was killed aged 18 at the Siege of Philippsburg (1688). Because he left no legal children, his half-brother Jean-Louis had to take up his old titles again.

Some years before his death, François de Callières had been working to make Charles Paris eligible for the vacant Polish crown, which in 1669 fell to his main competitor, Michał Korybut Wiśniowiecki.

Charles-Paris is remembered with a bust in the Galerie des Batailles in the Palace of Versailles.

== Sources ==
- Anselm de Guibours, Histoire généalogique et chronologique, Band 1, 1726, Page 223f
- Charles Clémencet, Maurus Dantine, Ursin Durand, L’art de vérifier les dates…, Band 12, 1818, Page 411
- Detlev Schwennicke, Europäische Stammtafeln, Band 3.2, 1983, Table 311
