= Léonor d'Orléans, duc de Longueville =

Léonor d'Orléans
- duc de Longueville
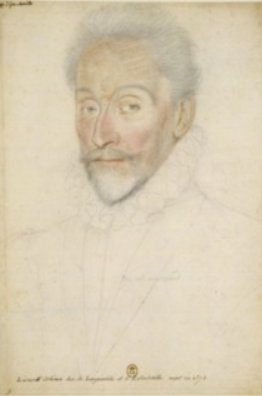
- Portrait of Longueville
- Other titles: Governor of Picardy, prince de Châtellaillon, marquis de Rothelin, comte de Neufchâtel, Montgommery et Tancarville, vicomte d'Abbeville
- Born: c. 1540
- Died: c. 1573; Kingdom of France
- Family: House of Orléans-Longueville
- Spouse: Marie de Bourbon, duchesse d'Estouteville
- Issue: Henri I d'Orléans, duc de Longueville; François III d'Orléans, comte de Saint-Pol; Antoinette d'Orléans; Éléonore d'Orléans
- Father: François, marquis de Rothelin
- Mother: Jacqueline de Rohan, Marquise de Rothelin

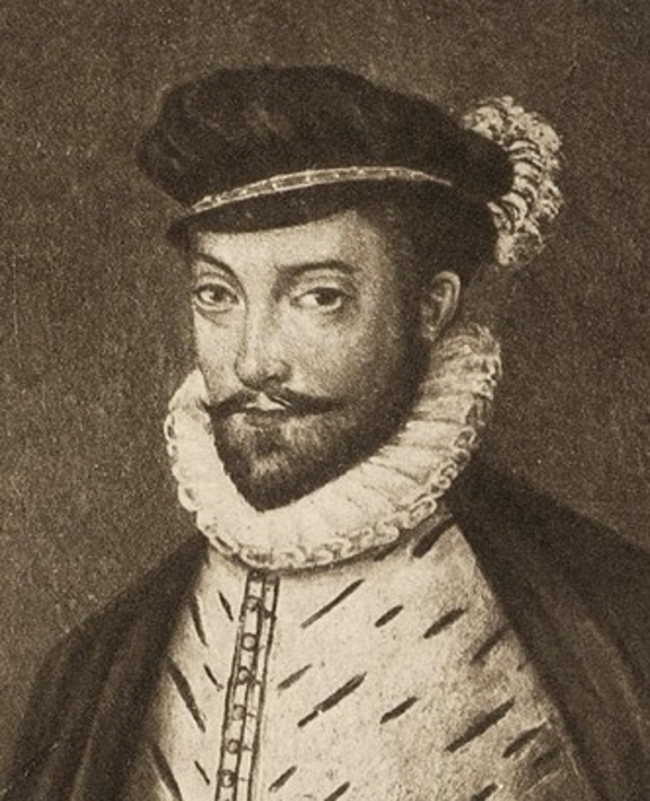
Léonor d'Orléans-Longueville from a 19th-century print

Léonor d'Orléans, duc de Longueville (1540 – 7 August 1573) was prince de Châtellaillon, marquis de Rothelin, comte de Montgommery et Tancarville, vicomte d'Abbeville, Melun, comte de Neufchâtel et Valangin. Longueville was governor of Picardy, the leader of one of the Prince étranger families of France and a descendant of the bastard of Orléans who was in turn a descendant of Charles V of France.

By Longueville's time his family was close to that of another princely house, that of the Guise, the Guise had controlled much of his family's estates during the life of his cousin, but when he died in 1551 the title of Longueville reverted to Léonor, and his mother championed his re-acquisition of the family estates. He fought in the later Italian Wars serving at the battle of Saint-Quentin in which he was captured. Close to the Guise, he received little help from court in paying off his ransom, but his mother petitioned the Guise to help him, who obliged. His mother, Jacqueline de Rothelin, was an open Protestant and Longueville adopted his mother's faith, corresponding with Calvin.

Upon the death of Henri II Longueville found himself slighted by the ascendant Guise, who took the title of grand chambellan from him. Nevertheless a betrothal was arranged between him and the duke's daughter. This engagement was broken off by François, Duke of Guise upon it becoming clear that Longueville would refuse to attend Mass. Despite these increasingly sour relations, Longueville was with Guise in his departure from court that October, leaving the regency government under Catherine de Medici perilously thin in terms of support. He remained loyal when civil war erupted between much of the Protestant nobility and the crown in early 1562, one of many princely Protestants whose sympathies with the reform ended at rebellion.

By 1563 he had abjured his Protestantism and was welcomed back by the Guise with open arms. A new marriage was arranged for him by the family, this time with Marie de Bourbon, Duchess of Estouteville. Longueville supported the Guise in their feud with the House of Montmorency over the assassination of the duke of Guise, a murder they blamed on Anne de Montmorency's nephew Gaspard II de Coligny. During the third civil war he commanded the rear-guard of the royal army at the battles of Jarnac and Moncontour. After the murder of Louis, Prince of Condé at the end of the former, he salvaged the prince's body from where it had been displayed. Condé had been governor of Picardy, and with his death Longueville became the governor of the critical region.

In 1572 he was ordered in his capacity as governor of Picardy to prevent Protestants from crossing the border to militarily assist their co-religionists in the Spanish Netherlands. His efforts in this regard were undermined by Charles IX who covertly supported an expedition, hoping to weaken Spanish power. During the Massacre of Saint Bartholomew he opposed the expansion of the killings into his territory as they spread across France. The following year he partook in the siege of La Rochelle. Shortly after he died, with Henri, Prince of Condé succeeding him to the governorship of Picardy.

== Early life and family ==
Born in 1540, he was the son of François, marquis of Rothelin, and Jacqueline de Rohan, Marquise de Rothelin. His mother was openly Protestant, and she instilled her faith in her son, who privately converted, corresponding in secret with Jean Calvin. He was the grandson of Louis I d'Orléans, duc de Longueville and he succeeded his first cousin, François III d'Orléans as duc de Longueville.

A close, faithful supporter of the Guise, he was betrothed on 23 January 1559 to the six-year-old daughter of the duke, Catherine. To offset the dowry the Guise highlighted the monetary assistance they had provided Longueville with his ransom from Spanish captivity. The engagement would be called off in April 1561, with François, Duke of Guise disgusted by Longueville's refusal to attend Mass.

He married Marie de Bourbon, Duchess of Estouteville, daughter of the Comte de Saint-Pol and Adrienne d’Estouteville in 1563. The match was engineered by the Guise to reward Longueville for his recent return to the Catholic fold, and to open channels between the Guise and Condé with whom they hoped to ally against the Montmorency. For the wedding, Longueville ordered a suit of clothes in black velvet banded with gold embroidery sewn with pearls from a Parisian embroiderer, Guillaume Corbeau.

Léonor and Marie had:

- Henri I d'Orléans, duc de Longueville
- François III d'Orléans, comte de Saint-Pol
- Antoinette d'Orléans (1572–1618), married Charles de Gondi, mother of Henri de Gondi, duc de Retz
- Éléonore d'Orléans (1573–1639), married in 1596 Charles Goyon de Matignon (1564–1648).
- Two unmarried daughters

== Reign of Henri II ==
The Guise household had held a strong grip on the estates of the Longueville, during the life of Longueville's cousin, a lawsuit followed his death in 1551, which was settled in favour of Léonor and his mother for control of the estates. While the Guise no longer commanded the territories, they remained close as a family with the Orléans.

Captured by the Spanish after the disastrous battle of Saint-Quentin, he was held by the imperial forces in the hope of a ransom. The crown did not rush to assist with his ransom, his proximity to the Guise at a time they were in disfavour making the king ill-inclined to support him. In 1558 Jacqueline de Rohan wrote to the Guise, whom she considered protectors of her son due to the close ties between the families, imploring them to intervene and supply the ransom for her captive son. As such the Guise themselves assisted in the payment of the ransom.

== Reign of François II ==
After the sudden death of Henri II in 1559, the new Guise ascended to the pinnacle of their powers over the crown. the Duke of Guise took the office of grand maître from Henri's favourite, the Constable Montmorency; they further acquired the office of grand chambellan at Longueville's expense. This began to sour relations between the families, but they did not break from each other.

Conscious of the religious and financial crisis facing the kingdom the Guise administration, responsible for the young François II, decided to call an Assembly of Notables. This assembly, comprising all the leading nobles of the kingdom, met at Fontainebleau in August 1560. Longueville was among the catalogue of grand nobles present, the only absentees being the renegade Bourbon princes Condé and Navarre who were conscious they would be arrested for their suspected involvement in the Conspiracy of Amboise if they showed. During the same year Charles, Cardinal of Lorraine was named guardian of Longueville's estates until he reached his legal majority. Longueville held vast holdings in Normandy where the Guise were also expanding their reach. His château at Tancarville became a haven for Protestants who were fleeing persecution.

== Reign of Charles IX ==
Longueville was among those who departed court with the end of the Guise government, as the young François II died and was succeeded by his brother Charles IX of France and a formal regency under his mother Catherine de Medici. In January Claude, Duke of Aumale and Longueville left court, Lorraine followed in February.

As the regency of Catherine developed, the crown took on an increasingly tolerant policy towards Protestantism. In early 1561 a flashpoint developed over the Pré aux Clercs affair. Despite Protestantism still being illegal in France, the seigneur de Longjumeau hosted regular services for many of the nobles of Paris in his residence. Longueville was among those who regularly frequented his residence for services. Angry Catholic militants, frustrated at the crown allowing this to continue with their full knowledge in Paris, attacked the residence; many of the Protestant nobles caught inside during the service armed themselves in defence. A riot followed, the result of which was the Parlement of Paris ordering the exile of Longjumeau from Paris. Following this the Guise became aware that Longueville had converted to Protestantism.

=== Departure from court ===
Shortly after the Colloquy of Poissy in which the crown had sought to re-unite the two faiths, Guise and his brother decided to depart court, frustrated at the failure of the Colloquy and ill inclined to follow the crown's increasing tolerant policy. Accompanying them in their grand departure from court were Longueville, Jacques, Duke of Nemours and several hundred horse. The presence of Longueville in this grand exit from court indicate that religious differences with the crown were not the sole reason for disillusion with the regency government. Montmorency joined the exodus from court, leaving a rump administration under Catherine, Navarre and a handful of Protestant councillors.

=== Loyalist ===
Despite his Protestantism, at the outbreak of the French Wars of Religion in 1562, the limits of Longueville's Protestantism were revealed. While he would offer concern and refuge to Protestants, he would not enter rebellion for them. In this regard he followed a similar path to his fellow princely Norman magnate the duke of Bouillon.

=== Abjuration ===
By 1563 Longueville had abjured his Protestantism, returning to the Catholic fold and providing a reconciliation with the Guise. His name was among those signatories in a petition to the king for justice following the assassination of the duke of Guise. The Guise family blamed Gaspard II de Coligny for the murder, bringing the Guise network into conflict with the Montmorency network, Montmorency determined to defend his nephew.

=== Feud ===
He continued to support the Guise in their feud with Montmorency after the failure of legal channels to achieve satisfaction. His support alongside that of Nevers was counted on when the notion of forming a militant league was floated in 1565. Ultimately this would come to nought and the only armed confrontation would be during the attempted Guise entry into Paris that year, during which they were humiliated.

As a provision of the Peace of Longjumeau the crown agreed to pay off the reiters that the Protestant rebels had hired for the campaign. To this end 500,000 livres were appropriated from the royal chest in Amboise. To ensure the full sum was delivered to Germany, Longueville and François de Montmorency went as security.

=== Third war of religion ===
During the third civil war, with the Protestant nobility operating out of the west, the main royal army under the nominal command of the king's young brother Anjou joined the king's cousin Louis, Duke of Montpensier in an abortive attack on Poitiers before the onset of winter. Longueville found himself in command of the royal force's rear-guard. Longueville's forces continued to support the main royal body during the battles of Jarnac in which the Protestant rear-guard was caught and destroyed, and the far more decisive victory at Moncontour over the remaining Protestant forces the following year. At the former battle, the Protestant leader the prince of Condé was killed in cold blood after his capture. As a result his governorship of Picardy became vacant, and Longueville was selected to fill the office. Longueville was disgusted at the treatment of the prince and retrieved his mutilated corpse from where it had been displayed by Anjou.

=== Crisis in the Netherlands ===
By 1572 the situation in the Spanish Netherlands was deteriorating for the authorities as rebellion spread. French Protestants, sympathetic for their compatriots abroad, began crossing the border in Picardie under arms to militarily support them. The Spanish protested vehemently to the crown about this provocation, and Charles instructed Longueville to prohibit crossings of the frontier. The king's opposition to border crossings was however circumspect and he covertly agreed to an unofficial expedition under the sieur de Genlis, however this was met with disaster and crushed by the duke of Alva. As the Saint Bartholomew's Day Massacre which had exploded in Paris spread out into the provinces, Longueville in his capacity as governor of Picardy used his influence to oppose attempts to introduce subsidiary massacres in his governorate.

=== La Rochelle ===
After the massacres across France, La Rochelle broke its submission to the crown, holding it responsible for orchestrating the massacres. As a result the city was put to siege, though it proved resilient. Frustrated, the crown entrusted Longueville to reach out to La Noue, one of the leading Protestant nobles in rebellion, to convince him that a settlement was in their best interest. While La Noue was successfully convinced, he in turn was unable to persuade the leaders of La Rochelle.

=== Death ===
Léonor died in 1573. at Blois and was buried at Châteaudun. His office of governor of Picardy was succeeded by the young Condé who had inherited his father's Protestantism. This appointment frustrated Louis de Gonzague, Duke of Nevers who had hoped for the office.

== Ancestry ==
Ancestors of Léonor d'Orléans, duc de Longueville

Jean d'Orléans, Count of Dunois
François d'Orléans, Count of Dunois
Marie d'Harcourt, Duchess of Parthenay
Louis I, Duke of Neufchatel
Louis, Duke of Savoy
Agnes of Savoy
Anne de Lusignan
François d'Orléans, Marquis de Rothelin
Rudolph IV, Margrave of Baden-Hochberg
Philip of Baden-Hochberg
Marguerite de Vienne
Johanna of Baden-Hochberg
Amadeus IX of Savoy
Marie of Savoy
Yolande of Valois
Léonor d'Orléans
Louis I de Rohan
Pierre de Rohan, Viscount of Fronsac
Marie, Dame de Montauban
Charles de Rohan, Viscount of Fronsac
Guillaume de Penhoët
Françoise de Penhoet
Françoise de Maillé
Jacqueline de Rohan, Marquise de Rothelin
Girolamo de Saint-Séverin
Bernard de Saint-Séverin, Prince of Besignano
Mondella Caetani
Jeanne de Saint-Séverin
Antonio Todeschini Piccolomini
Jeanne Eléonore Piccolomini
Maria Marzano of Aragon

== Sources ==
- Baird, Henry (1880). History of the Rise of the Huguenots in Two Volumes: Vol 2 of 2. Hodder & Stoughton.
- Carroll, Stuart (2005). Noble Power during the French Wars of Religion: The Guise Affinity and Catholic Cause in Normandy. Cambridge University Press.
- Carroll, Stuart (2009). Martyrs and Murderers: The Guise Family and the Making of Europe. Oxford University Press.
- Durot, Éric (2012). François de Lorraine, duc de Guise entre Dieu et le Roi. Classiques Garnier.
- Harding, Robert (1978). Anatomy of a Power Elite: the Provincial Governors in Early Modern France. Yale University Press.
- Knecht, Robert (2016). Hero or Tyrant? Henry III, King of France, 1574-1589. Routledge.
- Potter, David (1995). A History of France, 1460-1560: The Emergence of a Nation State. St. Martin's Press.
- Potter, David, ed. (2004). Foreign Intelligence and Information in Elizabethan England: Two English Treatises on the State of France, 1580-1584. Cambridge University Press.
- Roelker, Nancy (1996). One King, One Faith: The Parlement of Paris and the Religious Reformation of the Sixteenth Century. University of California Press.
- Shimizu, J. (1970). Conflict of Loyalties: Politics and Religion in the Career of Gaspard de Coligny, Admiral of France, 1519–1572. Geneva: Librairie Droz.
- Thompson, James (1909). The Wars of Religion in France 1559-1576: The Huguenots, Catherine de Medici and Philip II. Chicago University Press.

Léonor d'Orléans, duc de Longueville House of Orléans-Longueville Cadet branch of the House of Valois Born: 1540 Died: 7 August 1573
French nobility
Preceded by François III	Duke of Longueville; 22 September 1551 – 7 August 1573	Succeeded by Henri I
Regnal titles
Preceded by François III	Sovereign Count of Neuchâtel; 1551–1573	Succeeded by Henri I
