= Johanna of Hachberg-Sausenberg =

French countess (c.1485 – 1543)

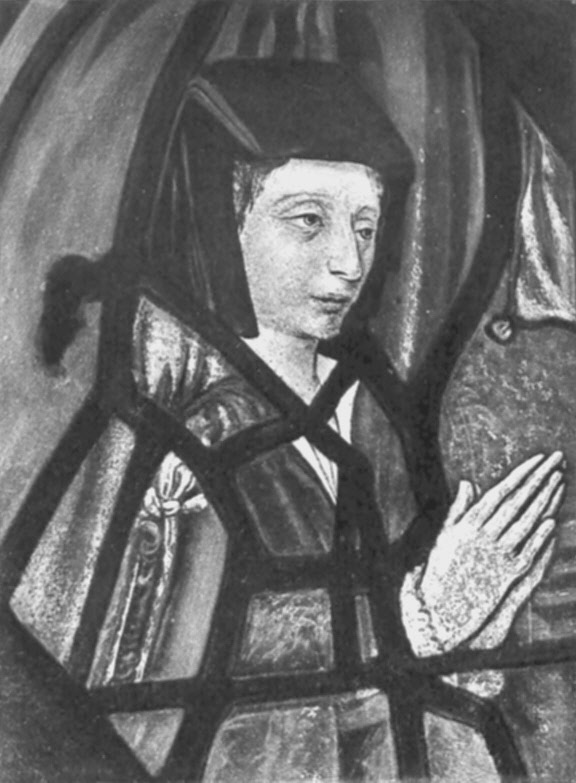
- Presumed portrait of Johanna in a stained glass window at Saint-Aspais Church, Melun
- Born: between 1485 and 1487
- Died: 23 September 1543; Époisses, Burgundy, France
- Noble family: House of Zähringen
- Spouse: Louis I d'Orléans, Duke of Longueville
- Father: Philip of Hachberg-Sausenberg
- Mother: Maria of Savoy

Johanna of Hachberg-Sausenberg (French: Jeanne de Hochberg; between 1485 and 1487 – 23 September 1543) was Countess regnant of Neuchâtel from 1503 to 1512 and again from 1529 until her death.

== Life ==
Born between 1485 and 1487, Johanna was the daughter of Philip of Hachberg, Count of Neuchâtel and Maria of Savoy. She inherited the rule of Neuchâtel from her father in 1503. In 1504, Johanna married Louis I d'Orléans, Duke of Longueville. As was the custom with female rulers at the time, her husband became her co-ruler.

From the beginning of her rule, Johanna continued her father and grandfather's policy of cooperation with the Swiss Confederation, renewing Neuchâtel's alliances with the Swiss cantons of Bern, Fribourg, Lucerne and Solothurn. However, the pro-French stance of Johanna's spouse and co-regent, which was regarded as a security threat by the Swiss, cast doubt on the credibility of this policy. The deterioration of Franco-Swiss relations due to King Louis XII's involvement in the Italian Wars led the cantons, especially Bern, to move to secure their northwestern border. In 1512, Switzerland occupied the County of Neuchâtel and turned the territory into a common bailiwick.

Johanna was actively involved in negotiations with the Swiss cantons to end the occupation and regain access to her county, and when she was widowed in 1516 her position in the negotiations improved. The occupation of Neuchâtel was discontinued in 1529, along with a sizeable reparation, and she was able to resume her reign. After returning to power, Johanna proved herself a poor administrator, particularly in financial matters, to the point that she considered selling the county, but ultimately leased it to the city of Neuchâtel from 1536 to 1544. The introduction of the Protestant Reformation in 1530, led by William Farel, dealt a further blow to her declining authority in the face of the demands of the vassals and burghers of Neuchâtel. Johanna died on 23 September 1543 in Époisses, France and was succeeded by her grandson François III d'Orléans, Duke of Longueville.

== Issue ==
Johanna and Louis had:

- Claude (1508 – November 9, 1524), Duke of Longueville and peer of France.
- Louis II (1510 – June 9, 1537), married Mary of Guise, succeeded his brother.
- François (1513–1548), Marquis of Rothelin, married Jacqueline de Rohan
- Charlotte (1512–1549), Mademoiselle de Longueville prior to her marriage to Philippe, Duke of Nemours.

== Legacy ==
In 1943, a street in Neuchâtel, the Rue Jehanne de Hochberg, was named after her.

== Sources ==
- Potter, David (1995). A History of France, 1460-1560: The Emergence of a Nation State. St. Martin's Press.
- Scott, Tom (2017). The Swiss and their Neighbours, 1460-1560: Between Accommodation and Aggression. Oxford University Press.
- Frédéric de Chambrier: Histoire de Neuchâtel et Valangin jusqu’à l’avénement de la maison de Prusse. Neuchâtel 1840, pp. 292–319

Preceded by Philip of Hachberg-Sausenberg	Sovereign Count of Neuchâtel; 1503–1543 (With Louis I d'Orléans, duc de Longueville)	Succeeded by François III d'Orléans, Duke of Longueville
