= Louis II d'Orléans, Duke of Longueville =

French aristocrat (1510–1537)

Louis II d'Orléans, duc de Longueville and comte de Dunois (1510 – 9 June 1537) was a French aristocrat and the first husband of Mary of Guise, who later became queen consort of Scotland and mother to Mary, Queen of Scots. He was the second son of Louis I d'Orléans, duc de Longueville by his wife Jeanne of Hochberg, and succeeded his brother Claude when the latter died in 1524.

He married Mary of Guise on 4 August 1534 at the Louvre Palace. During their brief marriage, the couple had two children:

- François, born 30 October 1535, who would later succeed to the dukedom
- Louis, a posthumous child born 4 August 1537, who died four months later.

Louis died at Rouen on 9 June 1537, (Note: Stuart Carroll states 1536) Mary would later marry James V, King of Scots.

== Ancestry ==
Ancestors of Louis II, Duke of Longueville

8. Jean, Count of Dunois
4. François d'Orléans, Count of Dunois
9. Marie d'Harcourt, Lady of Parthenay
2. Louis I, Duke of Longueville
10. Louis I, Duke of Savoy
5. Agnes of Savoy
11. Anne of Lusignan
1. Louis II, Duke of Longueville
12. Rudolf IV, Margrave of Hachberg-Sausenberg
6. Philip, Margrave of Hachberg-Sausenberg
13. Margaret of Vienne
3. Johanna, Countess of Neuchâtel
14. Amadeus IX, Duke of Savoy
7. Maria of Savoy
15. Yolande of Valois

== Sources ==
- Carroll, Stuart (1998). Noble Power During the French Wars of Religion: The Guise Affinity and the Catholic Cause in Normandy. Cambridge University Press.
- Potter, David (1995). A History of France, 1460-1560: The Emergence of a Nation State. St. Martin's Press.
- Warnicke, Retha M. (2006). Mary Queen of Scots. Taylor & Francis.

Louis II d'Orléans, Duke of Longueville House of Orléans-Longueville Cadet branch of the House of Valois Born: 1510 Died: 9 June 1537
French nobility
Preceded by Claude	Duke of Longueville; 1524–1537	Succeeded by François III
