= Philip of Hachberg-Sausenberg =

French count (1454–1503)

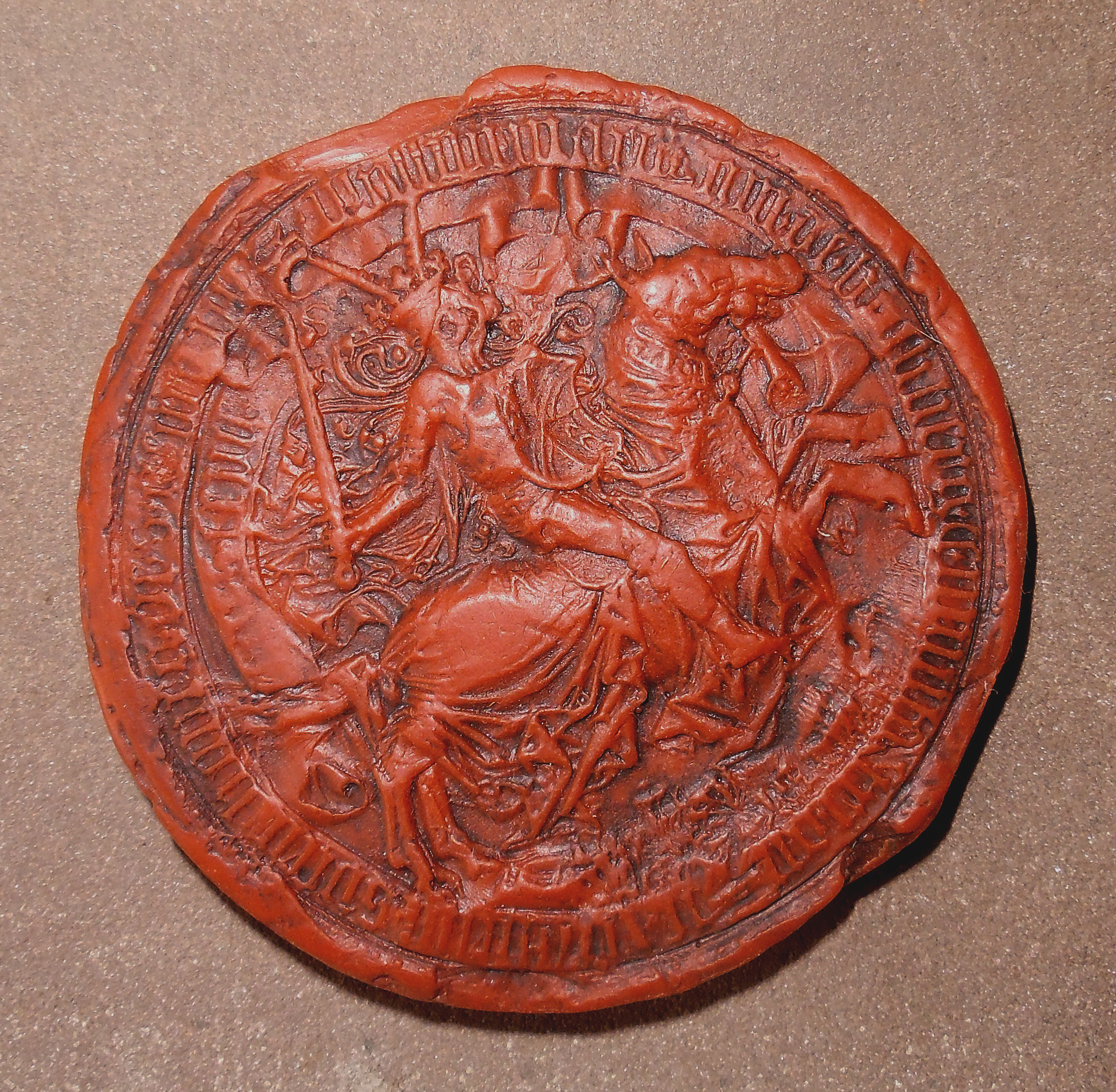
- Seal of Margrave Philip of Hachberg-Sausenberg (1490) in the museum of Rötteln Castle.
- Born: 1454
- Died: 9 September 1503 (aged 48–49); Montpellier, France
- Noble family: House of Zähringen
- Spouse: Maria of Savoy
- Issue: Johanna of Hachberg-Sausenberg
- Father: Rudolf IV, Margrave of Hachberg-Sausenberg
- Mother: Margaret of Vienne

Philip of Hachberg-Sausenberg (German: Philipp von Hachberg-Sausenberg; 1454 – 9 September 1503), known in French as Philippe de Hochberg, was Margrave of Hachberg-Sausenberg and Count of Neuchâtel from 1487 until his death. From 1466 he called himself Lord of Badenweiler.

== Career in Burgundy and France ==
Born in 1454, Philip was the son of Rudolf IV, Margrave of Hachberg-Sausenberg, and Margaret of Vienne. Like his father, he undertook a brilliant military and diplomatic career in service of the Duchy of Burgundy. During the Burgundian Wars, Philip participated in the Siege of Neuss and in the capture of Nancy, in 1474 and 1475; and served under Duke Charles the Bold at the battles of Grandson and Morat in 1476. After the duke's defeat and death at the 1477 Battle of Nancy, he turned away from Burgundy and sided with France, in an effort to avoid losing his Burgundian possessions. Following the attachment of the duchy to the French crown, Philip was appointed Marshal of Burgundy, remaining in that role until 1498. In 1484, he attended the coronation of King Charles VIII of France in Reims.

In 1478, Philip married Maria of Savoy, daughter of Duke Amadeus IX of Savoy and Yolande of France, the sister of King Louis XI of France; his marriage confirmed the new direction of his alliances. Philip became a close ally of Charles VIII, then of Louis XII, and was granted a seat in the Royal Council in 1484. The French monarchy bestowed upon him several offices and titles: he was made a member of the Order of Saint Michael in 1483, Grand Chamberlain of France in 1491 and Governor of Provence in 1491. Philip exerted a significant influence on French policy in Burgundy, a territory claimed by Maximilian I of Austria after his marriage to Charles the Bold's daughter, Mary of Burgundy.

== Reign ==
Philip succeeded his father as Margrave of Hachberg-Sausenberg and Count of Neuchâtel in 1487. He administered the County of Neuchâtel from afar, although with the same desire to defend his sovereign rights and prerogatives as his father. As Count of Neuchâtel, Philip continued his father's cooperation with the neighboring Swiss Confederation, a policy directed against Maximilian I. In 1494, he inaugurated a new mansion at his Rötteln Castle. The lavish interior of Neuchâtel Castle is also attributed to him. Philip died in Montpellier on 9 September 1503, aged about 49. He was succeeded by his daughter and only child Johanna of Hachberg-Sausenberg.

== Family ==
As part of his alliance with France, Philip married Maria of Savoy, daughter of Amadeus IX of Savoy, and one of the nieces of Louis XI, King of France, in 1478. With Philip's death, the male line of the Hachberg-Sausenberg family died out.

Philip's father, Rudolf IV, had begun negotiations with the senior line of the House of Zahringen (of which Rudolf's Hachberg-Sausenberg line was a cadet branch), which ruled the margraviate of Baden on the possibility of an inheritance treaty. Philip continued the negotiations with Christopher I, Margrave of Baden and on 31 August 1490, they came to an agreement on reciprocal inheritance. The treaty is known as the "Rötteln Match". The background of this treaty was that Christopher I intended his son and heir Philip I to marry Joan, the heiress of Hachberg-Sausenberg. This marriage did not materialize, due to political pressure from the French king.

His daughter, Johanna of Hachberg-Sausenberg (born ca. 1485 – died 1543), became Countess of Neuchâtel after her father's death in 1503, while Christopher obtained Sausenberg, Rötteln, Badenweiler and Schopfheim. In 1504, she married Louis d'Orléans-Longueville who, not yet having inherited his father's dukedom of Longueville, became known, jure uxoris, as the Marquis de Rothelin (Rötteln) (after Joan died in 1543, her son François assumed the title of Marquis de Rothelin, thereby starting the cadet line of Orléans-Rothelin). Joan and the House of Orléans-Longueville contested the Rötteln treaty and they tried to rally support for their case from the Swiss cantons of Solothurn, Lucerne, Fribourg and Bern. The dispute was settled in 1581, with the House of Baden paying 225000guilders to the House of Orléans-Longueville, but securing for Christopher's great-grandson Margrave Georg Friedrich of Baden-Durlach Sausenberg, Rötteln and Badenweiller in 1584.

== Gallery ==
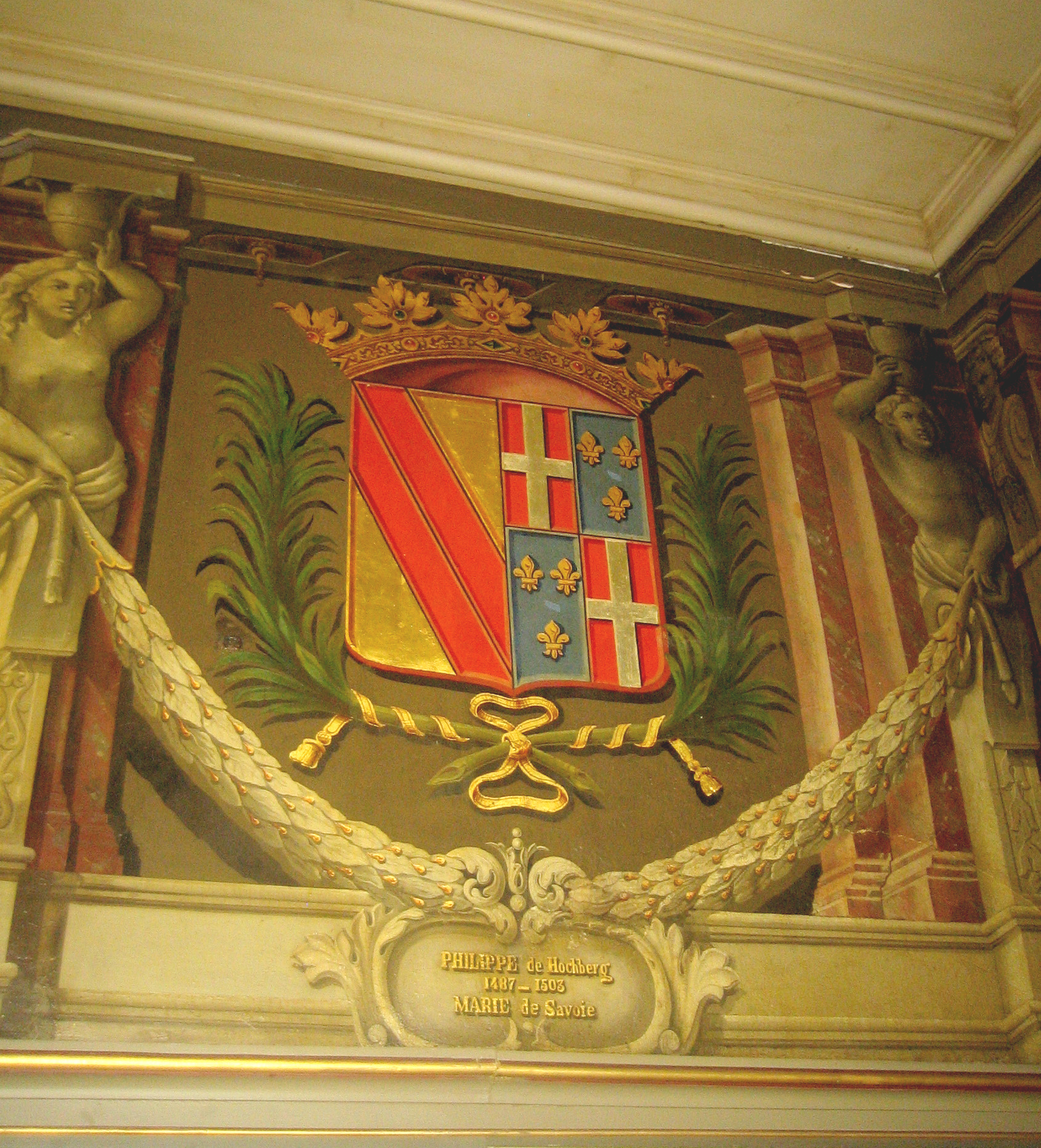
Panel with the coat of arms of Margrave Philip of Hachberg-Sausenberg (Philippe de Hochberg) and his wife Marie de Savoy at the Neuchâtel Castle

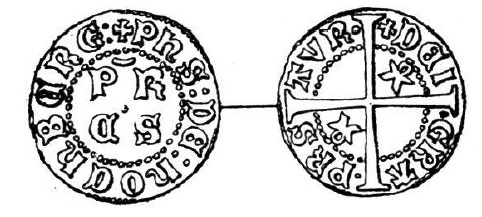
Denier of Philip 1478-1482: Ph[ilippu]s Hoahberg Pr As – Dei Gra[tia] Pr[incep]s Aur[ena] (= Orange).

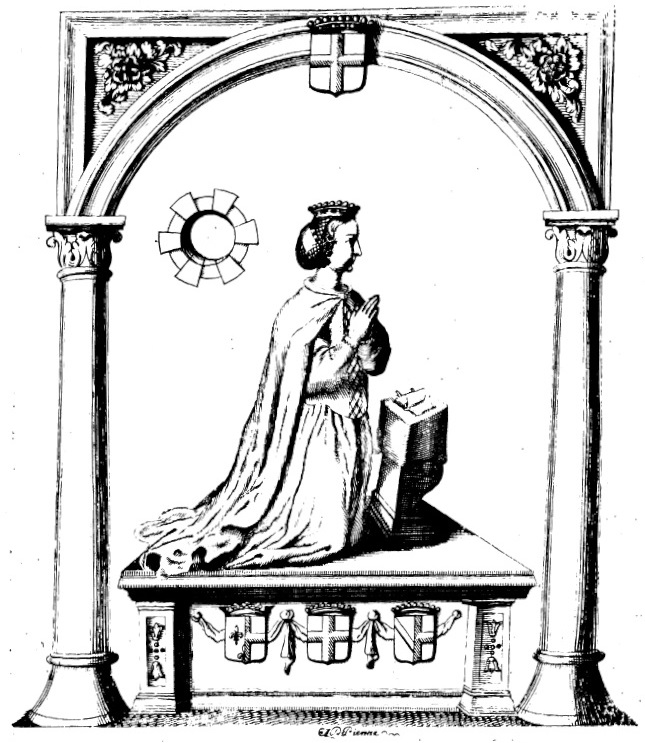
Maria of Savoy

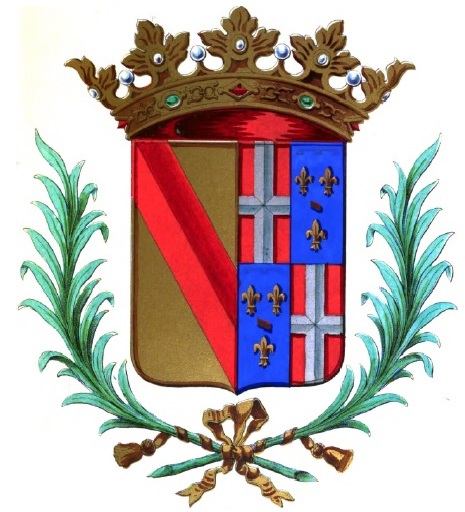
left part:Hachberg, right part:Savoy-Valois

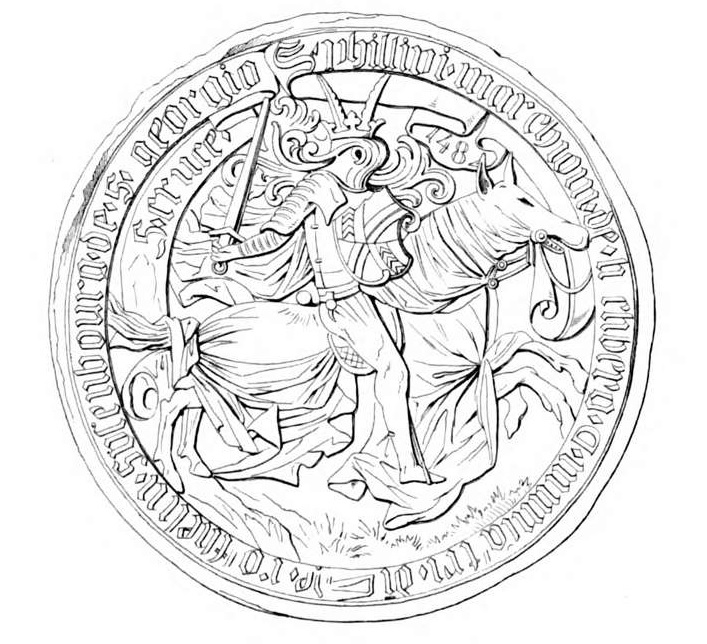
Seal (sigillum) of Philip

== References and sources ==
- Fritz Schülin: Rötteln-Haagen, Beiträge zur Orts-, Landschafts- und Siedlungsgeschichte, Lörrach, 1965, pp. 80–82.
- Fritz Schülin: Binzen, Beiträge zur Orts-, Landschafts- und Siedlungsgeschichte, Schopfheim, 1967, p. 525/526 (Genealogy of the House of Hachberg-Sausenberg).
- Karl Seith: Die Burg Rötteln im Wandel ihrer Herrengeschlechter, Ein Beitrag zur Geschichte und Baugeschichte der Burg, special edition published by Röttelbund e.V. in Haagen, place and year unknown, pp. 23–28; cited by Schülin as In: Markgräflerland, vol. 3, issue 1, 1931
- Hans Jakob Wörner: Das Markgräflerland – Bemerkungen zu seinem geschichtlichen Werdegang, in: Das Markgräflerland, issue 2/1994, Schopfheim, 1994, p. 64
- August Huber: Über Basels Anteil am Röteler Erbfolgestreit im Jahre 1503, in: Basler Zeitschrift für Geschichte und Altertumskunde, vol. 4, 1905, online
- Johann Christian Sachs: Einleitung in die Geschichte der Marggravschaft und des marggrävlichen altfürstlichen Hauses Baden, Frankfurt and Leipzig, 1764, part 1, pp. 575–588
- The inheritance treaty is reprinted in: John Staub: The contract of inheritance between Margrave Christoph I of Baden, Margrave Philip of Hachberg of 31 Aug. 1490, in: The Markgräflerland, No. 1 / 1991, Schopfheim, 1991, pp. 93–103

== Footnotes ==
Philip of Hachberg-Sausenberg House of Baden-Hachberg-Sausenberg Born: 1454
Preceded by Rudolf IV	Margrave of Hachberg-Sausenberg; 1487–1503	Succeeded by Christopher I
Preceded by Rudolf IV	Sovereign Count of Neuchâtel; 1487–1503	Succeeded by Johanna
