= Duke of Longueville =

Title created in 1505 for François d'Orléans

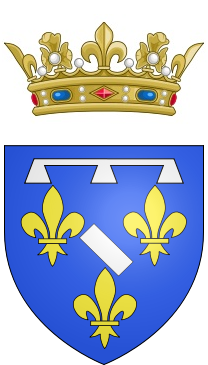
Coat of arms of the Dukes of Longueville

Duke of Longueville (Longueville-sur-Scie) was a title of French nobility, though not a peerage of France.

== History ==
The title was created in 1505 by King Louis XII of France for his first cousin once removed, François d'Orléans, Count of Dunois, son of François d'Orléans, Count of Dunois, son of Jean d'Orléans, himself an illegitimate son of the Duke of Orléans. The title became extinct in 1694, following the death of Jean Louis Charles d'Orléans, who was the brother of Marie de Nemours.

From 1648, the Duke of Longueville was also Sovereign Prince of Neuchâtel, a Swiss territory. In 1654, the eighth duke was created a peer as Duke of Coulommiers, but the peerage was never registered and so became extinct at his death.

== Dukes of Longueville ==
1. François II (1478–1513).
2. Louis I (1480–1516), brother of the preceding.
3. Claude (1508–1524), son of the preceding.
4. Louis II (1510–1537), brother of the preceding.
5. François III (1535–1551), son of the preceding.
6. Léonor (1540–1573), first cousin of the preceding.
7. Henri I (1568–1595), son of the preceding.
8. Henri II (1595–1663), son of the preceding.
9. Jean Louis Charles (1646–1694), son of the preceding. He resigned the title to his brother in 1668.
10. Charles Paris (1649–1672), brother of the preceding. On his death, the title went back to his brother.
11. Jean Louis Charles (1646–1694).

Name	Portrait	Birth	Marriages	Death
Léonor d'Orléans; 1551–1573		1540 eldest son of François d'Orléans, Marquis de Rothelin and Jacqueline de Rohan	Marie, Duchess of Estouteville; 2 July 1563 six children	7 August 1573; Blois aged 32–33
Henri I d'Orléans; 1573–1595		1568 eldest son of Léonor d'Orléans and Marie, Duchess of Estouteville	Catherine Gonzaga; 1 March 1588; Paris one son	8 April 1595; Amiens aged 26–27
Henri II d'Orléans; 1595–1663		6 April 1595 only son of Henri I d'Orléans and Catherine Gonzaga	(1) Louise de Bourbon; 10 April 1617; Paris three children (2) Anne Geneviève de Bourbon; 2 June 1642; Hôtel de Conti four children	11 May 1663; Rouen aged 68
Jean Louis Charles d'Orléans; 1663–1668		12 January 1646 eldest son of Henri II d'Orléans and Anne Geneviève de Bourbon	never married	2 April 1694; Abbey of Saint-Georges, Boscherville aged 48
Charles Paris d'Orléans; 1668–1672		29 January 1649; Hôtel de Ville, Paris youngest son of Henri II d'Orléans and Anne Geneviève de Bourbon	never married	12 June 1672; Crossing of the Rhine near Tolhuis aged 23
Jean Louis Charles d'Orléans; 1672–1694		12 January 1646 eldest son of Henri II d'Orléans and Anne Geneviève de Bourbon	never married	2 April 1694; Abbey of Saint-Georges, Boscherville aged 48

== Other members of the family ==
- Jean d'Orléans, brother of the first and second dukes.
- Marie of Lorraine ("Mary of Guise"), wife of the fourth duke.
- Jacqueline de Rohan, mother of the sixth duke.
- Françoise d'Orléans, Princess of Condé, sister of the sixth duke.
- the Dukes of Fronsac, descended from the sixth duke.
- Louise de Bourbon and Anne Geneviève de Bourbon, wives of the eighth duke.
- Marie de Nemours, daughter of the eighth and sister of the ninth and tenth dukes.
- Charles d'Orléans de Rothelin, descended from an illegitimate half-brother of the sixth duke.
- Princess Charlotte Louise de Rohan wife of Louis Antoine, Duke of Enghien
