= Henri I d'Orléans, duc de Longueville =

French aristocrat and military officer

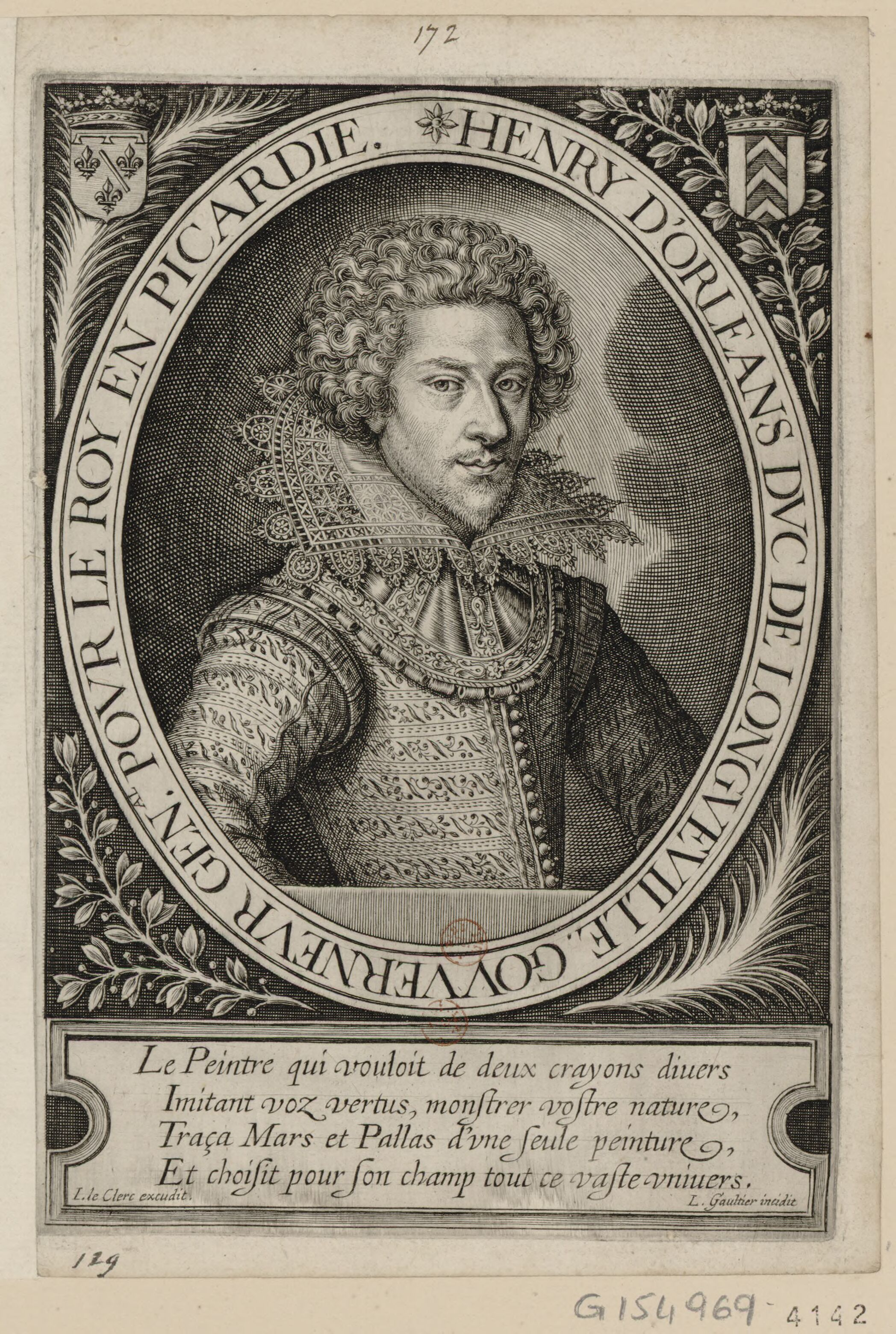
Portrait by Léonard Gaultier

Henry I of Orléans-Longueville (1568 – April 8, 1595) was a French aristocrat, military leader and Grand Chamberlain of France between 1589 and 1595.

== Biography ==
Henry was the eldest son of Léonor d'Orléans, duc de Longueville (1540–1573) and Marie de Bourbon, duchess of Estouteville and countess of Saint-Pol (1539–1601). He succeeded his father in 1573 as Duke of Longueville, Prince of Neuchâtel, Count of Saint-Pol, Count of Dunois and Tancarville. On 1 March 1588, he married Catherine Gonzaga (1568–1629), daughter of Louis Gonzaga, Duke of Nevers, and had one son, Henry II.

Henry was governor of Picardie and defeated the forces of the Catholic League under Charles, Duke of Aumale at Senlis in May 1589. When Henry III was assassinated later that year, Longueville pledged loyalty to his successor Henry IV of France and received command over the forces in Picardy and became Grand Chamberlain of France.

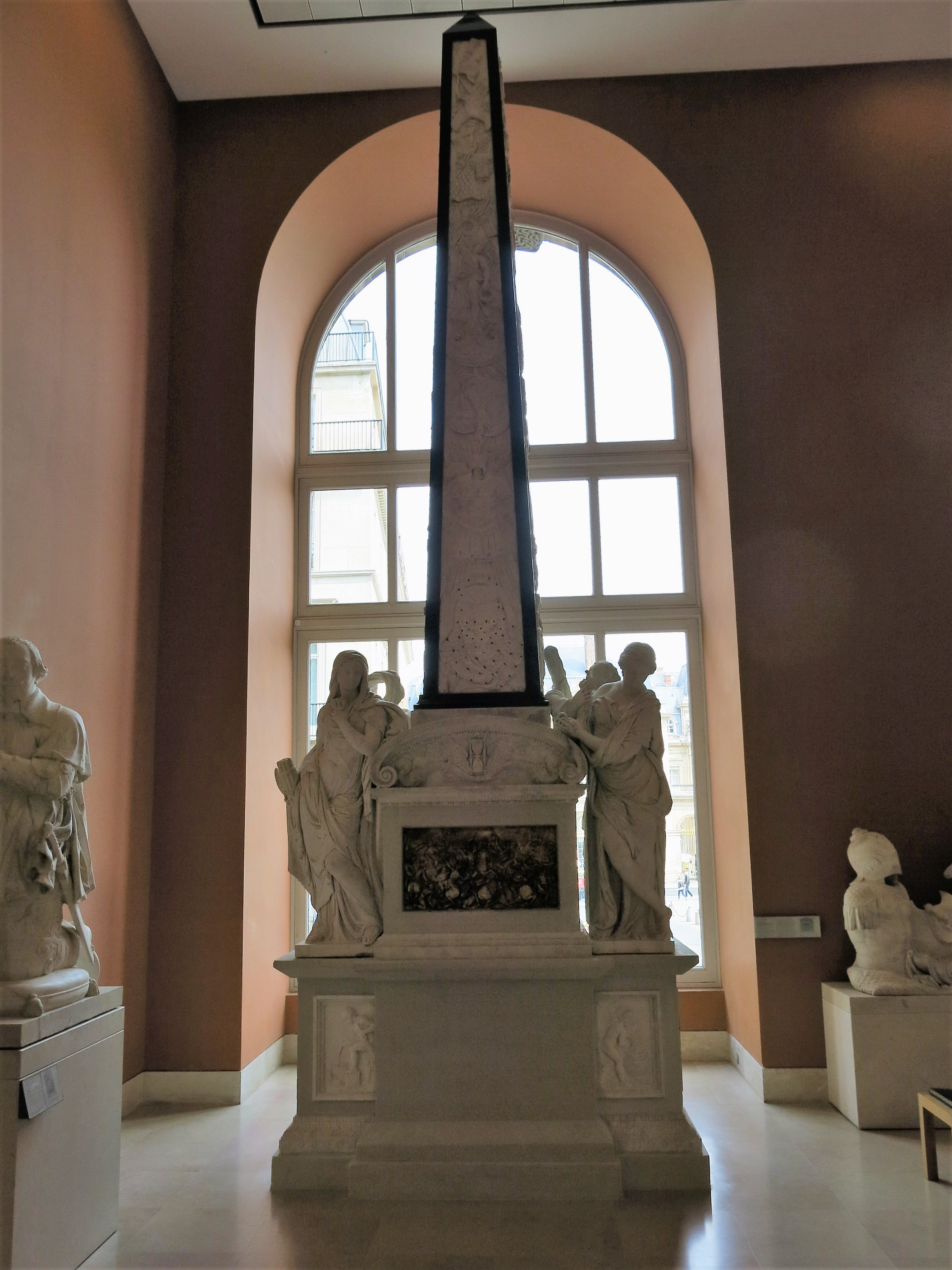
Funerary monument of the heart of Henri I d'Orléans in the Louvre Museum, by François Anguier

Longueville died in Amiens in 1595.

He was the loose inspiration behind the character of Longueville in William Shakespeare's Love's Labour's Lost.

== Sources ==
- Balsamo, Jean, ed. (2002). Les funérailles à la renaissance XIIe colloque international de la Société française d'étude du seizième siècle Bar-le Duc, 2-5 décembre 1999 (in French). Droz.
- Boltanski, Ariane (2006). Les ducs de Nevers et l'État royal: genèse d'un compromis (ca 1550 - ca 1600) (in French). Librairie Droz.
- Butler, A.J. (1904). "The Wars of Religion in France". In Ward, A.W.; Prothero, G.W.; Leathes, Stanley (eds.). The Cambridge Modern History. Vol. III. Cambridge at the University Press.
- Hibbard, G.R., ed. (1990). Love's Labour's Lost. Oxford University Press.
- Johnson, A.H. (2018). Europe in the Sixteenth Century 1494-1598: Period IV. Outlook Verlag.
- Potter, David, ed. (2005). Foreign Intelligence and Information in Elizabethan England: Two Treatises on the State of France, 1580-1584. Cambridge University Press.
- Spangler, Jonathan (2016). "Holders of the Keys: The Grand Chamberlain, the Grand Equerry and Monopolies of Access at the Early Modern French Court". In Raeymaekers, Dries; Derks, Sebastiaan (eds.). The Key to Power?: The Culture of Access in Princely Courts, 1400-1750. Brill. pp. 153–177.
- Ward, A.W.; Prothero, G.W.; Leathes, Stanley, eds. (1911). The Cambridge Modern History. Vol. XIII. Cambridge at the University Press.

== External list ==
- Liste des ducs de Longueville

Henri I d'Orléans, duc de Longueville House of Orléans-Longueville Cadet branch of the House of Valois Born: 1568 Died: 8 April 1595
French nobility
Preceded by Léonor	Duke of Longueville; 7 August 1573 – 8 April 1595	Succeeded by Henri II
Regnal titles
Preceded by Léonor	Prince of Neuchâtel; 7 August 1573 – 8 April 1595	Succeeded by Henri II
