= Louis I d'Orléans, duc de Longueville =

French aristocrat (1480–1516)

Louis I d'Orléans, Duke of Longueville (1480 – Beaugency, 1 August 1516), was a French aristocrat and general, Grand Chamberlain of France and governor of Provence.

Louis was the second son of François d'Orléans, Count of Dunois and Agnes of Savoy. He succeeded his elder brother François II in 1512, and became 2nd Duke of Longueville, Count of Montgommery, Count of Tancarville, Prince of Châlet-Aillon, Marquis of Rothelin and viscount of Abberville. His paternal grandfather, Jean, Count of Dunois, was the illegitimate son of Louis I, Duke of Orléans – son of King Charles V of France.

On 16 August 1513, Louis was taken prisoner by the English at the battle of the Spurs when he attempted to bring relief to the siege of Thérouanne. He was sent to Catherine of Aragon, who first lodged him in the Tower of London while she dealt with the Scottish invasion and the battle of Flodden. Longueville was treated very well in England, having a relationship with Jane Popincourt. He stood in for Louis XII of France in the marriage ceremony with Mary Tudor in Greenwich Palace on 13 August 1514.

Louis married in 1504, Johanna of Hachberg-Sausenberg, daughter of Philip of Hochberg.
They had:

- Claude (1508 – November 9, 1524), Duke of Longueville and peer of France
- Louis II (1510 – June 9, 1537), married Marie of Lorraine (Mary of Guise), succeeded his brother
- François (1513–1548), Marquis of Rothelin, married Jacqueline de Rohan and had issue:
  - Léonor d'Orléans, duc de Longueville, and Francoise d'Orléans
  - Another source claims the Marquis had an affair with Françoise de Blosset, resulting in a daughter, Francoise d'Orléans-Rothelin.
- Charlotte (1512–1549), Mademoiselle de Longueville prior to her marriage to Philippe, Duke of Nemours

== Sources ==
- Barbier, Jean Paul (2002). Ma bibliothèque Poétique (in French). Librairie Droz S.A.
- Gunn, Steven J. (2018). The English People at War in the Age of Henry VIII. Oxford University Press.
- Hayward, Maria, ed. (2017). Dress at the Court of King Henry VIII. Routledge.
- La Chenaye-Desbois, François Alexandre Aubert (1771). Dictionnaire de la Noblesse. Briqueville.
- Potter, David (1995). A History of France, 1460-1560: The Emergence of a Nation State. St. Martin's Press.
- Richardson, Walter Cecil (1970). Mary Tudor, the White Queen. University of Washington Press.
- Scott, Tom (2017). The Swiss and their Neighbours, 1460-1560: Between Accommodation and Aggression. Oxford University Press.

Louis I d'Orléans, duc de Longueville House of Orléans-Longueville Cadet branch of the House of Valois Born: 1480 Died: 1 August 1516
French nobility
Preceded by François II	Duke of Longueville; 1513–1516	Succeeded by Claude
Preceded by Johanna	Sovereign Count of Neuchâtel; 1504–1516 (With Johanna)	Succeeded by Johanna
