= Henri II d'Orléans, Duke of Longueville =

French prince and governor (1595–1663)

Henri II d'Orléans
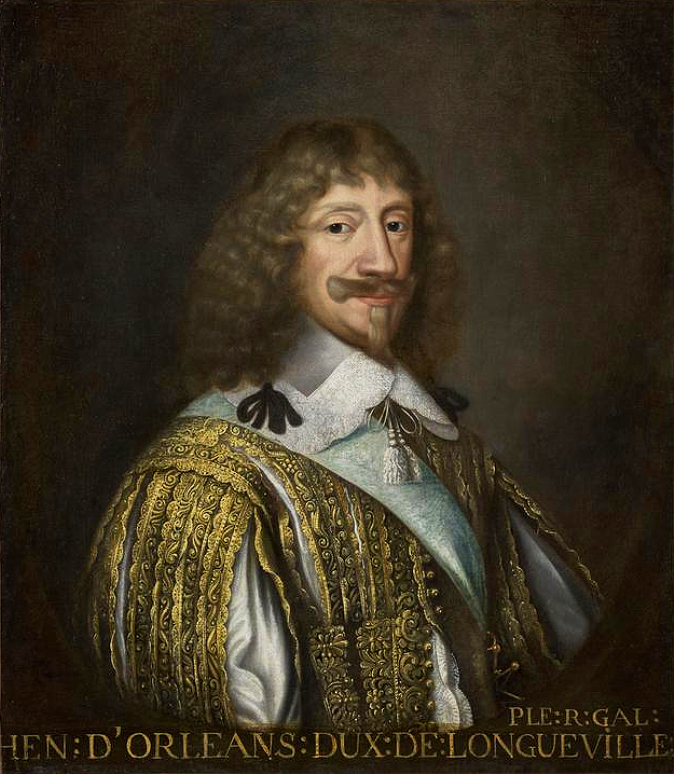

Duke of Longueville
- In office 1595–1663

Prince of Neuchâtel
- In office 1595–1663

Personal details
- Born: 6 April 1595
- Died: 11 May 1663 (aged 68)
- Spouses: Louise de Bourbon; Anne Geneviève de Bourbon
- Children: 7, including Marie and Charles Paris d'Orléans, Duke of Longueville
- Parents: Henri I d'Orléans, duc de Longueville (father); Princess Catherine Gonzaga (mother)

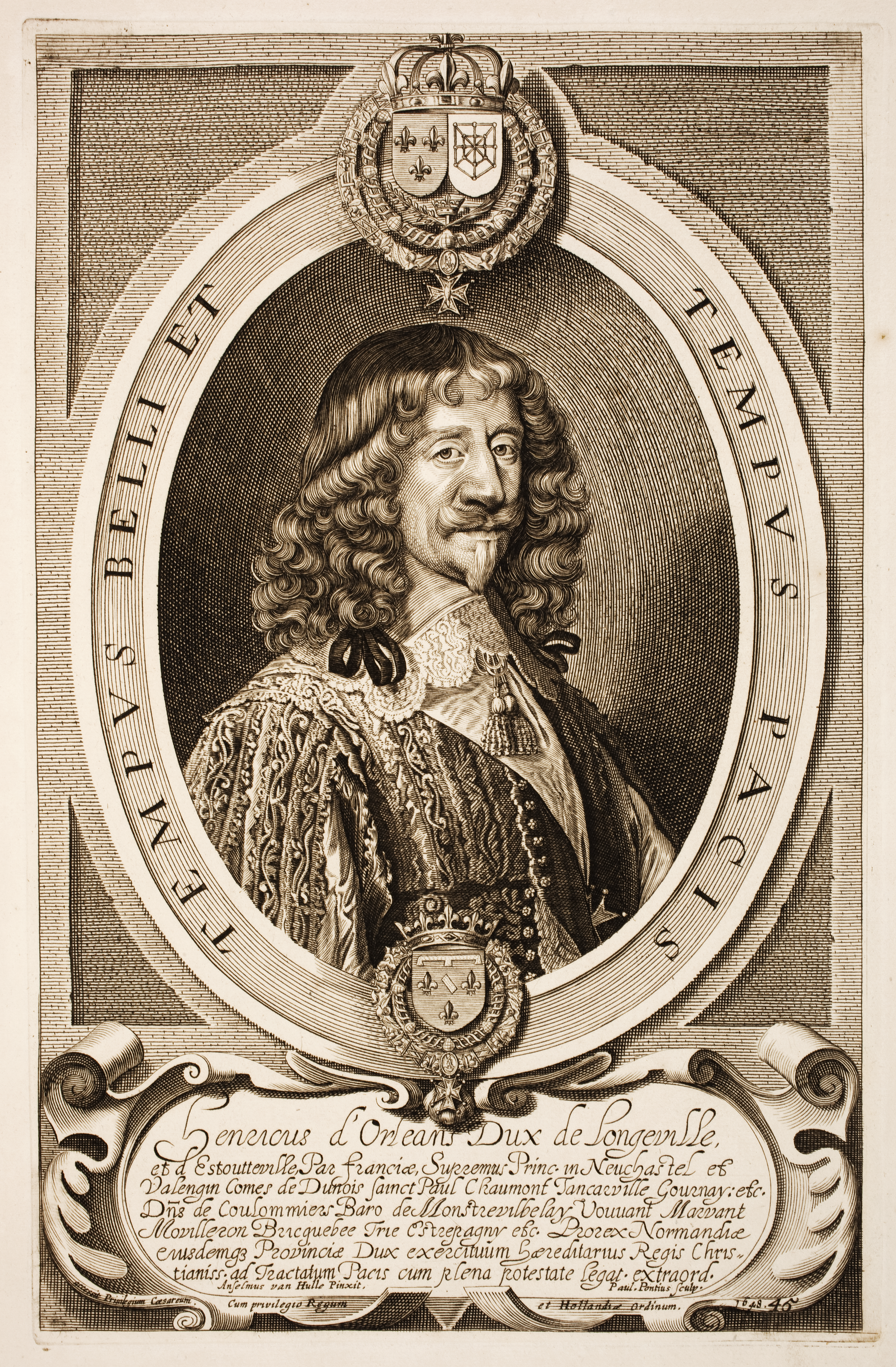
Engraving by Paulus Pontius.

Henri II d'Orléans, duc de Longueville or Henri de Valois-Longueville (6 April 1595 – 11 May 1663), a legitimated prince of France (of royal descent) and peer of France, served as governor of Picardy, then of Normandy, and was a major figure during the Fronde. (Note: He was also duc d'Estouteville and of Coulommiers, sovereign prince of Neuchâtel and Valangin, prince de Châtellaillon, comte de Dunois.)

== Life ==
He was the only son of Henri I d'Orléans, duc de Longueville and Princess Catherine de Nevers who belonged to the influential Gonzaga family.

As an opponent of Concino Concini, the favourite of Marie de' Medici, he joined the plot mounted in 1616 by Henri II of Bourbon-Condé, during which his forces occupied the city of Péronne, Concini's last remaining stronghold in Picardy. In 1619, he gave the governorship of Picardy to Louis XIII's favorite, Charles d'Albert, duc de Luynes, obtaining in exchange that of Normandy. In the summer of 1620, he joined the revolt of Marie de Medici, but the Parliament of Rouen and the city of Dieppe, which he besieged, remained loyal to the king. Longueville was suspended from his duties for a few months.

Longueville headed the French delegation in the talks that led to the Treaty of Westphalia which ended the Thirty Years War (1648). During the peace proceedings, his insistence on being called Altesse, added to the conflict regarding ambassadorial titles.

In his role as sovereign prince of Neuchâtel, and acting as antagonist of the Habsburg power rather than as liberal benefactor, he succeeded in obtaining formal exemption from the Holy Roman Empire for all cantons and associates of the Swiss Confederacy.

In 1642 he married Anne Geneviève de Bourbon; his brother-in-law was Louis II de Bourbon, Prince de Condé, leader of the aristocratic party in the Fronde. After the Peace of Rueil (11 March 1649) had ended the first phase of the civil war, Mazarin's sudden arrest of the Grand Condé, his brother the prince de Conti and their brother-in-law the duc de Longueville, on 14 January 1650 precipitated the next phase of the Fronde, the Fronde des nobles.

== Family ==
He married his first wife Louise de Bourbon in Paris on 10 April 1617, their children were:

- Marie (1625–1707), who married Henri II, Duke of Nemours
- Louise (1626–1628)
- X (1634–1634)

After his first wife's death, he married Anne Geneviève de Bourbon in 1642, their children were:

- Charlotte Louise, Mademoiselle de Dunois (1644–1645)
- Jean Louis Charles d'Orléans, Duke of Longueville (1646–1694)
- Marie Gabrielle (1646–1650)
- Charles Paris d'Orléans, Duke of Longueville (1649–1672).

== Sources ==
- d'Aubigné, Agrippa (2007). Fanlo, Jean-Raymond; Ferrer, Véronique; Fragonard, Marie-Madeleine; Schrenck, Gilbert (eds.). Œuvres complètes: Écrits politiques. Champion.
- Cook, Chris; Broadhead, Philip (2006). The Routledge Companion to Early Modern Europe, 1453-1763. Routledge.
- Croxton, Derek (2013). Westphalia: The Last Christian Peace. Springer.
- Hillman, Jennifer (2014). Female Piety and the Catholic Reformation in France. Routledge.
- Kettering, Sharon (2008). Power and Reputation at the Court of Louis XIII: The Career of Charles D'Albert, Duc de Luynes (1578-1621). Manchester University Press.
- Lord, Arthur Power (1903). The Regency of Marie de Médicis: A Study of French History from 1610 to 1616. New York: Henry Holt and Company.
- May, Niels F. (2017). "Stage sovereignty or aristocratic values? Diplomatic ceremonial at the Westphalian peace negotiations (1643-1648)". In Sowerby, Tracey A.; Hennings, Jan (eds.). Practices of Diplomacy in the Early Modern World c.1410-1800. Routledge.
- Mousnier, R. (1970). "French Institutions and Society 1610-61". The New Cambridge Modern History. Vol. 4, The Decline of Spain and the Thirty Years War. Cambridge University Press.
- Ward, A.W.; Prothero, G.W.; Leathes, Stanley, eds. (1911). The Cambridge Modern History. Vol. XIII. Cambridge at the University Press.

== External list ==
- Liste des ducs de Longueville

Henri II d'Orléans, Duke of Longueville House of Orléans-Longueville Cadet branch of the House of Valois Born: 6 April 1595 Died: 11 May 1663
French nobility
Preceded by Henri I	Duke of Longueville; 8 April 1595 – 11 May 1663	Succeeded by Jean Louis Charles
Regnal titles
Preceded by Henri I	Prince of Neuchâtel; 8 April 1595 – 11 May 1663	Succeeded by Jean Louis Charles
