= Leonora (given name) =

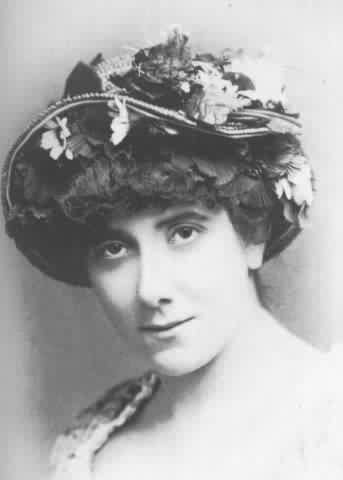
- Leonora Braham as Patience in the opera Patience
- Pronunciation: /liːəˈnɒrə/
- Gender: Female

Origin
- Origin: Italian, Spanish
- Region of origin: Europe

Other names
- Related names: Eleanor

Leonora is a feminine given name which is a variation of Eleanor. It was relatively common in the 19th century in Western countries, ranking as the 314th most popular female given name in the United States in 1880. The name has declined in popularity but remains in use. Sixty-four newborn American girls were given the name in 2020.

== People ==
- Leonara Elizabeth Grant (1931–2016), New Zealand actress, known as Lee Grant
- Leonora Ainsworth (1871–1939), American screenwriter
- Leonora de Alberti, English historian and suffragette
- Leonora Blanche Alleyne (1851–1933), English author, editor and translator
- Leonora Amar (1926–2014), Brazilian actress
- Leonora Anson, Countess of Lichfield (born 1949), British aristocrat
- Leonora LaPeter Anton, American journalist
- Leonora Armellini (born 1992), Italian pianist
- Leonora Armstrong (1895–1980), first Bahá’í to live in Brazil
- Leonora Arye (1931–2001), American sculptor and writer
- Leonora Baroni (1611–1670), seventeenth century musician and composer
- Leonora Barry (1849–1923), Irish-American labor activist
- Leonora Bilger (1893–1975), American chemist
- Leonora Braham (1853–1931), English opera singer and actress
- Leonora Brito (1954–2007), Welsh writer
- Leonora Carrington (1917–2011), Mexican surrealist painter
- Leonora Cohen (1873–1978), English suffragette and magistrate
- Leonora Corbett (1908–1960), British actress
- Leonora Scott Curtin, American botanist and philanthropist
- Leonora Demaj (born 1997), Danish-Kosovan handball player
- Leonora Dodge, American politician
- Leonora Dori (1568–1617), Italian-French courtier
- Leonora Duarte (1610–1678), Flemish musician and composer
- Leonora Ejupi (born 2000), Kosovan footballer
- Leonora Beck Ellis (1862–1951), American educator, author, poet, social reformer
- Leonora Eyles (1889–1960), English feminist writer
- Leonora Fani, Italian former film actress
- Leonora van den Heever (1926–2025), South African judge
- Leonora A. Hohl (1909–1997), American microbiologist
- Leonora Hornblow (1920–2005), American novelist, children's writer and socialite
- Leonora Hughes (1897–1978), American dancer
- Leonora Payne Ison, British architectural draughtsperson and artist
- Leonora Jakupi (born 1979), singer from Kosovo
- Leonora Jiménez, former Miss Asia Pacific International
- Leonora King (1851–1925), Canadian physician
- Leonora Lafayette (1926–1975), American soprano
- Leonora Jessie Little (1865–1945), Australian zoologist and philanthropist
- Leonora MacKinnon (born 1994), Canadian fencer
- Leonora Marescoe (1637–1715), English merchant
- Leonora Jackson McKim (1879–1969), American violinist
- Léonora Miano (born 1973), Cameroonian author
- Leonora O'Brien, Irish pharmacist and entrepreneur
- Leonora O'Reilly, American feminist, suffragist, and trade union organizer
- Leonora Okine (born 1981), Ghanaian actress
- Leonora von Ottinger, American actress
- Leonora Philipps (1862–1915), British feminist activist
- Leonora Piper (1857–1950), American trance medium
- Leonora Polkinghorne (1873–1953), Australian writer and women's activist
- Leonora Pujadas-McShine (1910–1995), Trinidadian women's rights activist
- Leonora Jeffrey Rintoul (1878–1953), Scottish ornithologist and author
- Leonora Milà Romeu, Catalan pianist and composer
- Leonora Ruffo (1936–2007), Italian film actress
- Leonora Sansay (1773–1821), American novelist
- Leonora Sanvitale
- Leonora St. George Rogers Schuyler (1868–1952), American socialite and clubwoman
- Leonora Selmer (1851–1930), Norwegian actress
- Leonora Sparkes (1879–1969), British-American mezzo-soprano
- Leonora Speyer (1872–1956), American violinist and poet
- Leonora Cannon Taylor (1796–1868), member of the Relief Society
- Leonora Tyson (1883–1959), English suffragette
- Leonora Christina Ulfeldt, Danish princess
- Leonora Wigan (1805–1884), British actor
- Leonora Wray (1886–1979), Australian golfer
- Leonora Zheleva (born 1999), Bulgarian footballer
- Leonora (singer) Danish singer, representing Denmark at the Eurovision Song Contest 2019
- Leonora Celestine Turzanski Ahlers (1839–1879) First female music teacher appointed by the Brooklyn Board of Education in 1871

=== Fictional characters ===
- Leonora Johnson, in the 2013 videogame GTA V.
- Leonora Orantes, in the 2011 film Contagion, played by Marion Cotillard
- "Leonora" is used for Eleonora di Guienna, a main character in Donizetti's opera Rosmonda d'Inghilterra
- Leonora, the heroine of Verdi's operas La forza del destino and Il trovatore
- Leonora Ashburnham, in the Ford Madox Ford novel The Good Soldier
- Leonora Clyde, in the 1960 film The Little Shop of Horrors
- Leonora, in the film Topsy-Turvy
- Leonora, the villain of the Mexican TV series Miss XV
- Leonora, in the video game Final Fantasy IV: The After Years

== See also ==
- Leonore (given name)
- Leonor, Princess of Asturias, Spanish princess
