= Charles de Bourbon =

Charles de Bourbon may refer to:

- Charles I, Duke of Bourbon (1401–1456)
- Charles II, Duke of Bourbon (1434–1488), archbishop of Lyon and a cardinal
- Charles III, Duke of Bourbon (1490–1527), Bourbon-Montpensier
- Charles de Bourbon, Duke of Vendôme (1489–1537), Bourbon-La Marche
- Charles, Cardinal de Bourbon (born 1523), of the Vendôme branch, archbishop of Rouen and a cardinal
- Charles, Cardinal de Bourbon (born 1562), archbishop of Rouen and a cardinal
- Charles III de Bourbon (archbishop of Rouen) (1554–1610), of the Vendôme branch
- Charles de Bourbon, comte de Soissons (1566–1612), Bourbon-Soissons
- Charles, Duke of Berry (1686–1714)
- Charles de Bourbon, Count of Charolais, second son of Louis III (1700–1760)
- Charles III of Spain, known as Charles of Bourbon (1716–1788), King of Spain, Naples, and Sicily
