= Siege of Rouen =

Siege of Rouen may refer to:

- Siege of Rouen (1143–1144), the siege and capture of the town by Geoffrey Plantagenet, Count of Anjou
- Siege of Rouen (1204), the siege and capture of the town and castle by the French during the French annexation of Normandy
- Siege of Rouen (1418–1419), the siege and capture of the town and castle by the English during the Hundred Years' War
- Siege of Rouen (1449), the siege and capture of the town and castle by the French during the Hundred Years' War
- Siege of Rouen (1562), the siege that set the stage for the main battle of the war at Dreux several months later
- Siege of Rouen (1591–1592), the unsuccessful siege of the town and castle during the French Wars of Religion, by the Protestant King Henry IV of France
