= Hohl =

Hohl is a surname. Notable people with the surname include:

- Anton Friedrich Hohl (1789–1862), German professor
- Arthur Hohl (1889–1964), American character actor
- Daryl Hall (born 1946 as Daryl Franklin Hohl), American singer and songwriter
- David Hohl (born 1966), Canadian wrestler
- Heinrich Hohl (1900–1968), German politician
- Leonora A. Hohl (1909–1997), American microbiologist
- Ludwig Hohl (1904–1980), Swiss author
- Joan Hohl (1935–2017), American author
- Courtenay Hohl (2010-present), dancer, actress, and #best person
