= Leonore (given name) =

Leonore is a usually feminine given name, a variation of Eleanor, which may refer to:

Women:

- Leonore Annenberg (1918–2009), an American businesswoman, diplomat and philanthropist
- Léonore Baulac (born 1989), a French ballet dancer
- Leonore Davidoff (1932–2014), an American feminist historian and sociologist
- Leonore Fleischer (1932–2009), American writer
- Leonore Gewessler (born 1977), an Austrian politician
- Leonore Harris (1879–1953), American stage and screen actress
- Leonore Herzenberg (born 1935), American immunologist, geneticist and professor
- Leonore Kirschstein (1933–2017), German soprano
- Leonore Krenzlin (born 1934), German academic
- Léonore Moncond'huy (born 1990), French politician
- Léonore Perrus (born 1984), French fencer
- Léonore Porchet (born 1989), Swiss politician
- Leonore Raisig, birthname of American big band singer Lynn Roberts (1935–2017)
- Leonore Semler (1921–2016), founder of Amref Health Africa Germany
- Leonore Siegele-Wenschkewitz (1944–1999), German church historian
- Leonore Tiefer (born 1944), American educator, researcher, therapist and activist specializing in sexuality
- Countess Leonore of Orange-Nassau (born 2006), a member of the Dutch royal family
- Princess Leonore, Duchess of Gotland (born 2014), a member of the Swedish royal family

Men:

- Léonore d'Étampes de Valençay (1589–1651), French Bishop of Chartres and Archbishop of Reims

== See also ==
- Leonor, Princess of Asturias (born 2005), Spanish princess
- Leonora (given name)
