= Charles, Cardinal de Bourbon (born 1523) =

French cardinal

His Eminence Charles I de Bourbon
- Cardinal; Archbishop of Rouen; Primate of Normandy
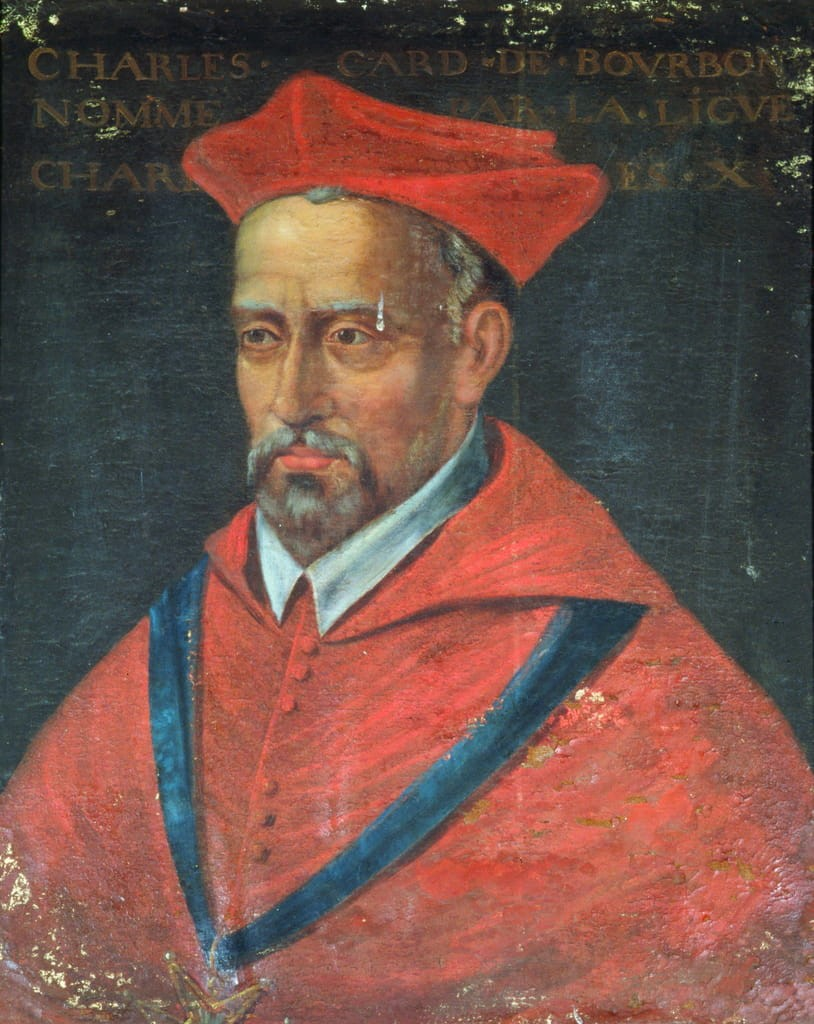
- Portrait of Cardinal Bourbon
- Church: Catholic Church
- Diocese: Rouen
- Appointed: 3 October 1550
- Term ended: 9 May 1590
- Predecessor: Georges II d'Amboise
- Successor: Charles II de Bourbon-Vendôme
- Other post: Cardinal Priest of San Crisogono
- Previous posts: Bishop of Nevers (1540-1546); Bishop of Saintes (1544-1550); Bishop of Carcassonne (1550-1553, 1565-1567); Bishop of Beauvais (1569-1575)

Orders
- Created cardinal: 8 January 1548 by Pope Paul III
- Rank: Cardinal-priest

King of France
- Reign: 2 August 1589 – 9 May 1590
- Predecessor: Henry III
- Successor: Henry IV
- Contender: Henry IV
- Born: 22 September 1523; La Ferté-sous-Jouarre, Kingdom of France
- Died: 9 May 1590 (aged 66); Fontenay-le-Comte, Kingdom of France
Names
- Charles de Bourbon
Regnal name
- Charles X
- House: Bourbon-Vendôme
- Father: Charles, Duke of Vendôme
- Mother: Françoise d'Alençon

Charles de Bourbon (22 September 1523 – 9 May 1590), known as the Cardinal de Bourbon, was a French noble and prelate. He was the Archbishop of Rouen from 1550 (as Charles I) and the Catholic Ligue candidate for King of France as Charles X from 1589.

Born the third son of Charles of Bourbon, Duke of Vendôme and Françoise d'Alençon he was destined for a career in the church. As a member of the House of Bourbon-Vendôme, he was a prince du sang. Already having secured several sees, he was made a cardinal by Pope Paul III in January 1548. In 1550 he received the office of Archbishop of Rouen making him the Primate of Normandy. The following year the promotion of Bourbon to Patriarch of the French church was threatened by King Henry II to secure concessions from the Pope. During the Italian Wars which resumed that year, Bourbon played a role by supporting Catherine de Medici's regency governments in France and briefly holding a lieutenant-generalship in Picardy. In 1557 the Pope appointed the Cardinals Bourbon, Lorraine and Châtillon as the leaders of an inquisition in France to root out heresy. The effectiveness of their inquisition would be obstructed by both the king and the Parlements and by July 1558 their appointments were voided by the Parlement of Paris.

Under the Guisard government that accompanied the reign of Francis II, Bourbon allied himself with the Guise, against his brothers. With his brother the Prince of Condé implicated in the Conspiracy of Amboise in March 1560, and further troubles in the south in the following months, Bourbon was tasked with coaxing the renegade prince to show himself at court, which he succeeded in doing in September, allowing Condé to be arrested and charged with treason. After the premature death of the king, Bourbon navigated himself into favour with the regency government of Catherine for Charles IX. In March 1562 he again assumed his duties in Paris, trying to avoid an explosive confrontation between Condé and the Duke of Guise. After the first civil war that followed that year, Bourbon was entrusted with pushing the terms through the Parlement, which he achieved. In the years that followed, Bourbon positioned himself on the centre of Catherine's council. He was increasingly disillusioned with his brother Condé and the Queen of Navarre, conducting a lawsuit against her without success. During the next two civil wars, he continued to fulfil diplomatic responsibilities for the crown. Bourbon was tasked with leading the mass that would celebrate the wedding between his nephew Henry of Navarre and Marguerite de Valois at their wedding. The lack of papal approval for the marriage terrified him, but he was eventually convinced to perform the ceremony.

After the fifth civil war, Bourbon virulently opposed the Peace of Monsieur, leading attempts to block it in Rouen. The new king Henry III entrusted him with persuading the Estates General to provide money for the resumed war effort, forced on the crown by the widespread opposition to the peace. He achieved little success. Henry was keen to overhaul the kingdom's finances and Bourbon participated in the various efforts towards this end in 1582 and 1586. However in the former assembly, Bourbon derailed proceedings with an outburst. He demanded for the king to expunge heresy.

In 1584, the king's brother Francis, Duke of Anjou died, making Bourbon's Protestant nephew the new heir to the throne. Neither Bourbon nor many other Catholics could tolerate such a prospect, and the notion of his succession to the throne as an alternative was established, formalised in a treaty with Spain in the Treaty of Joinville. In the following years, Bourbon supported the Catholic League in its efforts to enforce Catholic uniformity on Henry III. Henry was forced to agree to void Navarre's right to the succession, consequently making Bourbon his heir. After the day of the barricades, the liguer Estates General nominated Bourbon as the leader of the first estate. However the League was outflanked when Henry killed the young Duke of Guise and his brother. In the aftermath of this shocking development, much of the kingdom voided its allegiance to Henry and swore loyalty to the League and Bourbon as Charles X. Bourbon though had been arrested by the king in this sudden strike and he moved from château to château to keep him out of the hands of the League. In August 1589, Henry was in turn assassinated and the Parlement of Paris declared that Bourbon was now king. Nominally recognised as such across the League-dominated regions, he remained in the captivity of Henry of Navarre, dying in May 1590.

== Early life and family ==
=== Family ===
Charles was born in 1523 at La Ferté-sous-Jouarre, in what is now the department of Seine-et-Marne, the eighth child of Charles of Bourbon, Duke of Vendôme and Françoise d'Alençon. The third son to make it out of infancy, he was destined for a career in the church. His elder brother Antoine of Navarre, became King of Navarre through his marriage to Jeanne d'Albret. Meanwhile, his younger brother Louis de Bourbon converted to Protestantism, and would lead the rebels in the first three religious wars.

Charles acted as godfather to his nephew the young Henry son of Antoine and Jeanne. He took great interest in his Catholic nephews Soissons and Conti, sons of his brother Louis, hoping to ensure that the Norman territories the family possessed were well maintained for the princes.

=== Ecclesiastical empire ===
Charles rose rapidly in the Roman Catholic hierarchy, becoming a Cardinal in 1548. He resigned his office as Bishop of Carcassonne in 1550, receiving a 2/3 pension on his departure. After the death of his successor to the office in 1565 he attempted to regain the bishopric through rights of regression. The canons of Carcasonne resisted, however the king pressured them to allow his return. The vast array of ecclesiastical offices he held made him one of the most prominent pluralists of Francis I's reign. Indeed, by 1547 he held 3 Sees simultaneously. That same year Pope Paul III declared that Cardinals should only hold one bishopric. While this was initially ignored in France, by 1550 pressure was beginning to be brought to bear on pluralism. To this end the various Cardinals of France began trying to sell off their bishoprics. He acquired the rich abbey of Saint-Germain-en-Prés in Paris. He held a considerable number of abbeys in Normandie, among them Saint-Ouen Abbey, Rouen and Jumièges Abbey. By 1588 the majority of his income of 63,000 livres was derived from Norman benefices.

=== Reputation ===
Charles had a reputation as a drunk, more interested in wine cellars than he was in the finer points of politics. Many historians have considered him unintelligent and a puppet of more able men. Others have argued he ably exploited his position in the succession.

== Reign of Henry II ==
=== New favourites ===
With the death of King Francis I, the house of Bourbon entered a period in the political wilderness. Charles and his brothers were left out in the cold by Henry II who preferred his favourite Anne de Montmorency for many of the honours and privileges of court. Though the family was denied the ascendency typical to the princes of the blood in many reigns, Charles was already Bishop of Saintes and Carcassonne in 1548 when he was granted the honour of being elevated to the Cardinalate. He received the special promotion from Pope Paul III on 9 January 1548, as a show of the Papacy's favour towards France, his cousin Charles of Lorraine had been made Cardinal not six months prior.

=== Coronation ===
That same year Henry II decided to make an entry into the city of Lyon. The prominent French cardinals sat with him through the festivities and tournaments that followed. The queen had not yet been crowned, and to this end a coronation was arranged for 10 June 1549. Several days before the event the king and queen travelled to the Basilica of Saint-Denis where they were received by Bourbon, who welcomed them to the abbey. On the day of the coronation it was the duty of Charles and the Cardinal of Lorraine to fetch the queen and her entourage and bring them to the abbey. Charles had the most critical role to play in the ceremony itself, anointing Catherine with the sacred oils.

=== Patriarch ===
Despite having been made Archbishop of Rouen in 1550, an office he would hold until his death, Charles would very rarely visit his diocese, spending the majority of his time at court. This was not uncommon at this time, archbishops in general rarely had connections to their dioceses. In 1551 a council proposal was raised to elevate Charles to Patriarch of the French church, a radical response to the dispute that had engulfed Franco-Papal relations over the vacancy of the See of Marseille. Opposition to such a proposal came from both the Parlement of Paris, and the Cardinal of Lorraine. Charles for his part lacked much enthusiasm for the proposal, fearful of the potential for a further fracturing of the Catholic church when unity was needed against the Ottoman Empire. Regardless, the threats of establishing such a church had the desired effect and Pope Julius III conceded on most points in the dispute, which would be submerged the following year by the Franco-Papal alliance against Charles V Despite the threat of creating a French Patriarch, Henry had a low opinion of Charles's intelligence, thinking him unqualified to serve on his council.

=== Italian Wars ===
==== Three Bishoprics ====
The Italian Wars which resumed in 1551, led the following year to the French occupation of the Three Bishoprics, strategic cities in Alsace. Henry II, delighted by the acquisitions, visited Metz in 1552. Catherine de' Medici was placed at the head of a regency council, and set herself about governing with considerable energy. One of her first acts was to write to Charles in his capacity as governor of the city of Paris urging him to have preachers who denounced Henry's alliance with Protestant princes of the Holy Roman Empire arrested. Charles was to find new clergy who would support the king in his taxation of the church to fund the war effort. As Bishop of Laon, he was granted the title of 'peer of France', he maintained this title, even after he resigned the office in 1552.

==== Picardy ====
The Italian Wars entered the province of Picardy in 1553, as Emperor Charles V sought revenge on France for the humiliation of the capture and successful defence of Metz the previous year. Charles was appointed as lieutenant-general of Amiens under the authority of Jacques d'Albon who held lieutenant-general powers over the wider province. The campaign season would not be a success, with the destruction of Thérouanne.

=== Inquisitor ===
On 26 April 1557, Charles, Cardinals Lorraine and Châtillon were appointed as inquisitors for the Kingdom of France. This gave Charles the right to hear appeals and delegate authority over heresy cases. In July of that year the king confirmed the three cardinals position as leaders in the fight against heresy through a decree. However the decree provided more limits on their authority, with appeals courts set up in every Parlement town, in which twelve persons would sit of which half had to be Parlementaires. Over the next years little progress would be made against Protestantism in France, and the inquisition proved fairly toothless in comparison with its Spanish counterparts. This is largely due to the fact the papal commission to the three Cardinals were resisted strongly by the Parlement of Paris, which resented Papal intrusion on French religious affairs. As such, the commissions were not registered until January 1588, and were subsequently rescinded in June 1558. Even prior to the rescinding the commissions had largely been a dead letter. Henry preferred to prosecute the war against heresy through the secular courts, and to this end established the Edict of Compiègne in 1557 which established new penalties for various offences related to 'heresy'.

=== Guise ascendency ===
With word reaching Paris of the disastrous defeat of the royal army under Constable Montmorency at the Battle of Saint-Quentin, the regent, Catherine jumped into action. Together with Bourbon and the keeper of the seals she proceeded to the Hôtel de Ville where with the desperate situation highlighted and a speech given, she was granted 300,000 livres by the city to raise troops for the defence of the kingdom. As a consequence of the Constable's capture at Saint-Quentin, the Guise were ascendent in France, and able to secure for themselves a marriage between the Dauphin and their niece. The celebrations took place in Paris in 1558 with Cardinals Bourbon, Lorraine, Guise, Sens, Meudon and Lenoncourt proceeding ahead of the dauphin who was brought forth for the ceremony by Bourbon's brother Antoine of Navarre.

== Reign of Francis II ==
=== Dispersal ===
Upon the death of Henri in 1559, the Guise ascended to the apogee of their political power as the uncles of François II's wife. In the aftermath of the kings death Bourbon who was at court, did little to advocate for the political rights of his secular brothers. The Guise aimed to consolidate their hold on the administration, which had the potential to be challenged by a concerted push from the princes, as such they dispersed many of the senior princes on various missions. the Prince of Condé, Bourbon's brother was sent to Picardie to negotiate with Philip II, Cardinal Bourbon and his cousin Charles, Prince of La Roche-sur-Yon meanwhile were tasked with conducting Philip's new bride Elisabeth de Valois to her new home in Spain, and as such they departed south to the border in September.

=== Conspiracy of Amboise ===
After the Conspiracy of Amboise shook the Guise regime to its core in early 1560. Cardinal Bourbon was among those notables present for the reorientation of the crown's religious policy with the Edict of Amboise, the first French religious edict to draw a distinction between the crimes of 'heresy' and sedition, which had previously been considered one and the same offence. The edict afford amnesty to those only guilty of the former provided they live as good Catholics going forward. At this time Bourbon was close to the Guise administration, allied alongside Marshal Saint-André and Louis, Duke of Montpensier to the family, while many of the other leading nobles found themselves pushed aside.

=== Arrest of Condé ===
Alongside the beginnings of religious reform in March 1560, it was agreed that the crown would call for an Estates General to meet later in the year. It was hoped that this body would consider a package of financial and religious reforms to quiet the instability that racked the country in the wake of the crushing of Amboise. Following from this, an Assembly of Notables met in August 1560, containing all the grandees of the realm, except for Bourbon's brothers Antoine of Navarre and Condé, who were suspected of involvement both in Amboise and subsequent disturbances in the south. Bourbon and the other notables agreed to call for an Estates General to meet to tackle France's financial situation, while a general council of the church would restore religious unity. François was upset that Navarre and Condé had avoided attendance at the assembly, and wanted them to account for their involvements in the disorder of the year. Resultingly, Bourbon was tasked by the king in September of going south to Nérac to persuade his brothers to show themselves at court. After a considerable amount of cajoling the brothers agreed to head north for the Estates General at Orléans on 17 September, upon arrival Condé was promptly arrested and charged with treason.

== Reign of Charles IX ==
=== Catherine's regency ===
Only a few months into this new status quo, the young king died of an ear infection in December, and Charles IX inherited the crown. Charles IX was young and would require a formal regency as opposed to the de facto one that had been instituted for his brother. To this end Catherine de Medici using the leverage of Bourbon's imprisoned brother Condé, secured for herself the regency, granting Bourbon's other brother Navarre the role of lieutenant-general of the kingdom. The family were for the first time in years ascendent in French politics, with the Guise family and those who supported them departing court in January 1561. During the year 1561 Bourbon made one of his rare visits to his diocese at Rouen. The Spanish ambassador recorded that his visit was greeted by 'thousands of insults' from Protestants, who took the liberty to decorate his pulpit with a flock of geese, a traditional award given to the 'king of liars'. With the failure in 1561 of the Colloquy of Poissy and the Edict of July to resolve the religious question, Catherine attempted a new strategy in early 1562, convoking an assembly at St-Germain in January to draw up a new edict. While the Guise family and Montmorency would be absent, Bourbon was among the notables who participated in the proceedings. However he was unable to prevent Catherine and Michel de l'Hôpital forcing through their plans for full legal toleration of Protestantism, as embodied in the Edict of January.

=== First war of religion ===
Following the Massacre of Vassy and with tensions rising between Guise and Condé forces in Paris, Catherine de' Medici appointed him governor of Paris, hoping that he would be a suitable compromise candidate who would appease both sides. Charles attempted to get both men and their forces to leave the city, Condé and his supporters dutifully left on 23 March, briefly retiring to their estates, while Guise left the capital the following day, heading to Fontainbleau with Jacques d'Albon and Anne de Montmorency where they took possession of Catherine and Charles. Several days later Condé made for Orléans, seizing the city and declaring himself to be in rebellion against the 'tyranny of the Guise'. With Condé entering rebellion, his authority as governor of Picardy was voided. In his place Bourbon assumed his responsibilities for the duration of the civil war. Several weeks after the showdown in Paris, Montmorency entered Paris and oversaw the tearing down and burning of the Protestant churches in the city. After the fatal wounding of Navarre during the siege of Rouen in October, the dying Navarre was conducted by boat back to Paris. Bourbon came aboard at Les Andelys to have a last meeting with his brother. He brought with him a Jacobin friar, however Navarre was uninterested in the Jacobin, preferring his Protestant physician's company. Shortly thereafter he died.

=== Peace of Amboise ===
The first war of religion was brought to a close through the Peace of Amboise which offered a degree of toleration to Protestantism, though less extensive than that of the Edict of January in early 1562. The Edict of January had been bitterly resisted by the Parlements which had to register all edicts before they became law. To avoid a repeat of this the crown tasked Cardinal Bourbon and Louis, Duke of Montpensier to oversee the Parlement's registration session in Paris, to ensure that the court didn't get any rebellious ideas. On 27 March the Parlement reluctantly agreed to register the edict, though it was not until 30 March that they assented to publish it in Paris. While the court lacked the strength to block the edict, it set about sabotaging its implementation. As a component of the peace religious sites needed to be selected for the Protestant community across France. For the baillage of Senlis, the crown selected the faubourg of Pontoise. Cardinal Bourbon reacted with fury to this choice, as did many of the more militant Catholic inhabitants, but the king was unmoved, delegating authority to either keep or change the site to Marshal Montmorency, governor of the Île de France. This same year, tiring of his ecclesiastical life, he petitioned the Pope to release him from his religious obligations, however the Pope did not respond favourably.

=== Years of peace ===
During the following years Bourbon occupied a middle position on the council, between the Protestant party represented by figures such as Gaspard II de Coligny and the militant Catholics like Louis de Gonzague, Duke of Nevers. In 1564 he was a witness for the betrothal of Léonor d'Orléans, duc de Longueville to Marie de Bourbon, duchesse d'Estouteville. The marriage was a reward for Longueville's return to the Catholic fold and acted as more connective tissue between the Guise family and the Bourbons, who they hoped to reach out to in alliance against the Guise.

Bourbon would continue to take grievance with the applications of the peace, complaining to Catherine in 1566, while the court resided at Moulins, that Jeanne d'Albret and Condé were in violation of the edict through the preachers they brought to court with them, and that she should intervene to put a stop to this. Nothing would come of his intervention. He further escalated his family dispute that year with his attempts to reacquire lands he had waived his right to as part of the Bourbon-Vendôme inheritance with the marriage of Navarre and Albret, accusing Albret of fomenting trouble in the kingdom. However he had little success in this either with Catherine providing the crown's support to Albret, who exercised authority over the lands in question.

=== Second civil war ===
The abortive second civil war that was ignited by the Surprise of Meaux in 1567 and brought to a close with the Peace of Longjumeau in March 1568 would require provisions to ensure the removal of the German reiters that Condé had introduced into the country to support him against the crown. In negotiations the crown agreed that the funds to buy the reiters off into leaving would come from the royal treasury. 500,000 livres was acquired from the treasury, and to cover the remainder of the sum Cardinal Bourbon, the Duke of Montpensier and Marshal Montmorency were sent as security. In February 1568, Bourbon chided the radical Catholic preacher Simon Vigor, who was making a name for himself in Paris for his militant opposition to Protestantism, for inflaming the population of the city against Catherine de' Medici. Within several months the king attempted to co-opt Vigor towards royal policy by naming him prédicateur de roi, however he continued his sarcastic critiques of the administration, though more cautiously.

=== Third civil war ===
The peace of Longjumeau proved ephemeral however, and in September 1568 civil war resumed again, with the crown criminalising Protestantism and revoking the prior toleration edicts. To mark the start of the war in Paris a procession was held in which the symbols of royal authority were paraded through the streets. Cardinal Guise and Bourbon escorted Cardinal Lorraine as he held the consecrated host aloft. The three of them walked under a canopy supported by the four Montmorency brothers. After they passed, the remaining Princes of the Blood brought the royal sceptre and crown forth. The king followed the procession on his horse. In October he travelled with the new lieutenant-general of the kingdom the Duke of Anjou, brother to the king, to the town of Étampes from where he planned to begin the campaign against the rebels. The Protestant rebels suffered a heavy blow with the death of their commander Condé during a skirmish at Jarnac, however more German mercenaries were raised and they evaded attempted interception by the Duke of Aumale at the border. The German army, under command of Wolfgang, Count Palatine of Zweibrücken successfully captured the important Loire town of La Charité, affording them the ability to link up with the remainder of the Protestant forces under Admiral Coligny in the west of France. Concerned for the morale of the royal army after this embarrassment Catherine travelled to the royal camp in Saintonge with Cardinal Lorraine and Bourbon. Arriving at the royal camp they provided moral support to the forces.

Bourbon was instructed by Pope Pius V to use his influence on the court to disrupt the peace negotiations in 1570 that concluded in the Peace of Saint-Germain-en-Laye. He would not however succeed in offering an impediment to the treaty.

=== Two marriages ===
In 1571 the second Prince of Condé married Marie of Cleves, his first cousin. Bourbon witnessed the signing of the marriage contract with disgust, accosting his nephew to ask how he could dare to marry in the Protestant fashion, and further without the required Papal dispensation to absolve him for marrying a close relative. Condé retorted that the only dispensation he required was that of the king. Bourbon, incensed by his response turned his back on his nephew. Alongside the other leading Catholics at court, he refused to attend the marriage ceremony later that year.

Bourbon was tasked by Catherine with playing a leading role in the marriage of Henry of Navarre and the kings' sister Marguerite of Valois. He was confronted about his proposed participation by the Papal legate Salviati, who was disappointed to find the Cardinal optimistic about the prospects of peace that the marriage would bring about. Cardinal Lorraine was dispatched to Rome to secure the required Papal dispensation for this inter-religious marriage, he was however unsuccessful in securing the Pope's blessing. This struck a blow to the optimism that Bourbon had expressed to Salviati. In response to the news Bourbon was terrified of what his involvement might mean for his standing with the church and as a result he locked himself in his abbey at Saint-Germain-des-Prés. It took visits from Catherine, Marshal Tavannes, Marshal Biron and Secretary of State Villeroy for him to be coaxed back to court. Catherine was eventually able to overcome his objections to secure his involvement in the proceedings. Having been coerced into participation, he oversaw the nuptial mass and other key religious elements required to host the marriage.

== Reign of Henry III ==
Of all the princes of the blood, by 1574 the only two granted privy to the discussions of the conseil privé were Louis, Duke of Montpensier and Cardinal Bourbon. This gave them access to the heart of royal decision making in the first days of Henry III's reign.

=== First ligue ===
==== Peace of Monsieur ====
The Peace of Monsieur which brought the fifth war of religion to a close, offered generous terms to the Protestants, in the hopes of re-securing the loyalty of the kings brother Alençon. Alençon himself would see his appanage greatly expanded and find himself granted surety towns in Picardy. In response to these developments, militant Catholics formed Catholic leagues', the first of which was founded in Péronne, aimed at opposing the peace. Bourbon took the moment to act, disowning his nephews Navarre and Condé for their Protestantism. In his capacity as Archbishop of Rouen, he opposed any reintroduction of Protestantism into his diocese as would have been a requirement of the peace. Hoping to obstruct the peace he and his local noble supporters evoked their obscure right to sit as members of the Parlement of Rouen. However they were unsuccessful in persuading the Parlement to reject the peace. Having failed through legal channels, he confronted Protestants as they travelled to worship in July at their recently re-opened temple, causing many to flee in terror.

His chief adviser in Rouen was François de Roncherolles. Roncherolles found himself in trouble with the king for advocating that non-Catholic princes be removed from the line of succession. This policy would advantaged the count of Soissons and Bourbon. Bourbon was guardian to the boy, and Roncherolles was the young man's guardian, as such both had advantage to be gained in Soissons climbing the ranks of succession. Even at this time Bourbon was not ignorant to the notion of his own succession to the throne, and pondered the prospect of petitioning the hope to allow him to leave his holy orders.

==== Fifth war of religion ====
The League movement would spread across France, dominating the Estates General called as a term of the peace, and pressuring Henry III to declare war on Protestantism once more. Henry decided to co-opt the movement, and led the League into the sixth civil war in 1577 as its leader, having re-modelled the League to suit his own interests after taking control. To prosecute the war however Henry required money, and Bourbon was one of the leaders he tasked with going to the second estate to shake them down for as much money as they could. He reminded the nobles that it was their duty to serve the king through services of arms, however his efforts would be a failure and the estates granted only a paltry sum to the king. Not satisfied, Henry dispatched his brother Alençon to see if he could succeed where the Cardinal and other notables had failed. Alençon again hammered on the notion of the nobles duty to fight, before trying to cajole the second estate into serving the king without pay for six months, with the promise that he would lead the crown's war effort in person. The cahiers of the estates submitted in February 1577 were unanimous in their desire for a resumption of war, however no more funds were offered than before Bourbon's appeals. The war which was thus resumed would be short, concluded with the harsher Treaty of Bergerac that sated the majority of the League demands, causing the movement to fade away for the moment.

=== Royal reform and invasion plans ===
On 31 December 1578 he was made the first commander in the Order of the Holy Spirit. That same year he travelled with Catherine to the south on a mission to restore peace to the troubled region. During 1581 he made another of his infrequent visits to his archdiocese of Rouen. He came for the purpose of assembling a council to discuss how to implement the Tridentine Decrees. The assembly promulgated various articles for how to achieve this, however they remained unimplemented. This council was the first such of its kind in France. In 1582 Henry III embarked on a program of reform, to curb royal expenditure and resolve problems in the administration of the kingdom. An Assembly of Notables met in November 1583 with the intention of addressing these issues and evaluating various proposals. Bourbon quickly attempted to derail the proceedings, first quarrelling with the Archbishop of Tours, Francis de La Guesle, who had proposed ending the right of the Archbishop of Rouen to release one prisoner of the city every Easter. Bourbon denounced La Guesle and the judiciary at large as a corrupt institution, La Guesle objected to this attack on the judiciary, but Bourbon quickly switched tact, dropping to his knees and begging the king to take more action against 'heresy' in the kingdom. This earned him a frustrated rebuke from Henry who cried 'uncle, these speeches come not from yourself: I know from where they come, speak no more to me of it.'. During 1582 and 1583 Bourbon was supportive of Guise's plan for an invasion of England, to liberate Mary Queen of Scots from Elizabeth I's captivity and restore Catholicism in the country. He held councils with the governor Meilleraye, Mayenne and Guise. Ultimately these plans would be jeopardised both by financial issues and domestic developments as related to Alençon.

=== Death of Alençon ===
Alençon, who had often been sickly, increasingly neared death in early 1584 as sickness consumed him. Bourbon began to make noises that it would make more sense for him to succeed Henry to the throne than Henry of Navarre, as France would not accept a Protestant king. The Duke of Guise was interested in this notion, and voiced his support in May of that year. At this time Bourbon secured a papal dispensation allowing him to marry, he had also divested himself of the majority of his abbey's and episcopal responsibilities. During the early summer King Henry called on Bourbon at his Norman palace, to inquire as to his inclinations regarding the throne. He inquired playfully whether the Cardinal had designs on the throne to which Bourbon denied everything, Henry pressed further and Bourbon admitted that the thought had crossed his mind. Henry laughed, and remarked that while Paris would surely accept him, the Parlement would not.

With the death of Henri's brother Alençon in June 1584, the succession, which had always been tenuous, defaulted to the king's cousin Henry of Navarre. Navarre was a Protestant, and the prospect of his ascent to the throne was unacceptable for many Catholics in France. The king for his part invited Navarre to the capital, and asked him to abjure from Protestantism, however Navarre refused. In September 1584 a conference was held at Nancy in which the Guise family assembled with their allies. The Norman sieur de Menneville attended in lieu of Bourbon's presence to represent his interests in the discussions that followed. Together the representatives agreed on the need to form an opposition movement to Henry III.

=== Second Ligue ===
==== Bourbon as king ====
To this end, a second national Catholic League was formulated, this one explicitly concerned with the matter of succession in contrast to the first which had concerned itself with the Peace of Monsieur. The Duke of Guise and Charles, Duke of Mayenne were leaders in this new League and they argued that due to Navarre's Protestantism he had defaulted on his right to succeed to the French crown. As such on the king's death royal authority would pass to his uncle, Cardinal Bourbon as Charles X. In the secret Treaty of Joinville of 31 December 1584 Bourbon was recognized by the leaders of the league and a representative of Philip II of Spain as the heir to Henry III of France. It was agreed that as king he would void the French alliance with the Ottoman Empire implement the Tridentine decrees and cease raids on Spanish shipping. In return for these concessions Philip promised to forward 600,000 livres, though this would be reimbursed once Bourbon was securely in control of his kingdom. This represented a radical act in itself with the rules of succession being altered to allow princes to select who they felt should succeed the door was opened to the notion of the Estates General electing a king as they would attempt to do after the death of Bourbon. Bourbon himself was not present for the treaty, and he stayed in Paris until 15 March when he departed for his Norman palace.

==== Treaty of Nemours ====
The League leaders began to seize much of the north and east of the country from their respective powerbases in Burgundy and Normandy. With many cities falling under their authority, the aged Cardinal was moved to Reims, the traditional site of royal coronations. The king wrote to Bourbon on 16 March speaking of him as a second father and asking for advice for how he should proceed. On 21 March, Guise promulgated the Manifesto of Péronne, in which he explained why Cardinal Bourbon and many of the peers of France had rejected the possibility of a Navarre succession. In addition to the religious warnings of persecuted Catholics under a Navarre government, all taxes introduced since the reign of Charles IX were to be abolished, and Estates General meetings were to become triennial. Much of the manifesto was devoted to lambasting the regime for its tolerance of Protestantism in the prior decade. In hopes of defending himself from Protestant accusations that he planned to make himself king, Guise instructed his cousin the Duke of Elbeuf to conduct Bourbon to Péronne, birthplace of the first Catholic League in 1576. In April Catherine met with Guise and Bourbon to negotiate, having brought them to the table with threats of negotiations with Henry of Navarre. Bourbon was excited to hear the king was willing to outlaw 'heresy', but stressed that it was necessary to go further and actually remove 'heresy' from France. They met again a little while later, now Bourbon and Guise demanded surety towns, with Bourbon flying into a rage when Catherine hesitated on this point, arguing fiercely that these towns were not for the League but to protect Catholicism. Catherine retorted that the kings offer should be good enough for them, causing both to walk out of the meeting. With the League military increasingly consolidating and the king having been little able to oppose it, he was forced to sign the League friendly Treaty of Nemours in July 1585, in which Navarre was excluded from the succession, thus making Bourbon the heir, and the League was granted 'surety' towns to ensure his compliance. The surety town of Soissons was granted to Bourbon specifically.

=== Fiscal Reform ===
Henry III again tried to kickstart his program of fiscal reform, pushing through many edicts on the matter to the Cour des Comptes, Bourbon was given the task of presenting the legislation for registration, something he attempted on 25 June 1586, the edicts interfered with the Parlements through the introduction of a tax on procureurs Pasquier provided a withering assessment of the edicts to Bourbon, and after being informed of the Parlements reaction by the Cardinal, the king was forced to retreat from the tax. In Champagne, a long running spat between the Duke of Nevers and Guise over who would be governor of Mézières was settled with Nevers' reinstallation of the original governor, Vieuville. Guise at last assented to the return of Vieuville, having been assured by Bourbon that Vieuville was his servant, and would not impede their project. In May 1587 Catherine again met for negotiations with Guise and Bourbon, who were fighting with the Duke of Bouillon. She managed to get them to extend by several weeks a recently declared truce with the duke. However she was unable to convince them to hand over Doullens or Le Crotoy which the League had seized in Picardy, to the region's new governor Nevers.

=== Day of the Barricades ===
In the wake of the Day of the Barricades in which the king was humiliated in Paris and forced to depart from the city for fear of his personal safety, he entered into new negotiations with the League. These negotiations led to the Edict of Union in July 1588, signed during Henry's stay at Rouen in which he reaffirmed his support for the Treaty of Nemours, upheld the succession of Cardinal Bourbon, provided new governorships to the Guise and made the Duke of Guise lieutenant-general of the kingdom. These were largely disingenuous concessions however, as Henry was playing for time. To this end he dismissed all his ministers, and called an Estates General hoping to outflank and isolate the Guise with carefully chosen representatives to the body. His efforts were however a failure, as the League was able to dominate the Estates General. The first estate, nominated Cardinal Bourbon and Cardinal Guise as their presidents, while the liguer Brissac led the second estate and the liguer La Chapelle-Marteau led the third estate. The estates in general demanded more financial concessions from him which Henry tentatively agreed to but the third estate wanted more, arguing that the king was ultimately answerable to the estates. This was unacceptable to Henry.

=== Assassination of the Duke of Guise ===
Fearing that his authority as king was slipping away, Henry decided in a radical course of action to regain the initiative. In December, while staying at the Château of Blois Henri struck at the leadership of the League. Having invited the Duke of Guise and Cardinal Guise to a council under false pretences on 23 December 1588, he had them both killed for plotting against him on 23 and 24 December respectively. Bourbon for his part was arrested on the same day, and held in the castle of Blois alongside the Archbishop of Lyon, Duke of Nemours and Duke of Elbeuf, and the late Guise's son the Prince of Joinville. In January, Catherine came to visit the imprisoned Bourbon. She offered him the kings forgiveness, and promised that he would be set free. Bourbon was however furious at his treatment, denouncing her for 'bringing about this butchery'. He was transferred from one castle to another to prevent his escape. His prison was considered too close to Catholic territory, so he was again transferred, this time to Fontenay-le-Comte. In May Pope Sixtus V wrote a rebuke to Henry, demanding he have Bourbon and the Archbishop of Lyon released from captivity, and then come to Rome within 60 days to explain his actions on pain of excommunication.

== King ==
=== Prisoner ===
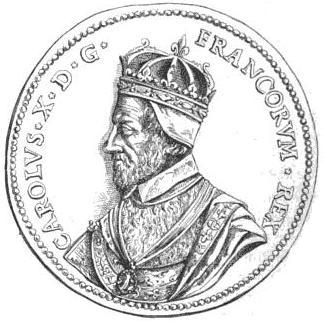
Medal featuring a portrait of Charles as king

On Henri III's death in 1589, the Catholic League proclaimed Bourbon king, while he was still a prisoner in the Château de Chinon under the authority of Henry of Navarre. In Rouen the banners of the Penitents displayed a rendition of his face poking out from the bars of his cell, the city having quickly fallen under the authority of a League government which established a council of 12, largely composed of men who owed their careers to Bourbon or Guise. Although he functioned now as a convenient compromise candidate for the various powerful magnates that compromised the noble leadership of the League there was increasing resentment between the various regional power brokers, Philippe Emmanuel, Duke of Mercœur in Bretagne, Elbeuf and Aumale in Normandie, Guise in Champagne and Mayenne in Bourgogne. He was recognized as Charles X by the Parlement of Paris on 21 November 1589. The liguer controlled towns also swore their loyalty to him as their king, though many had already done this after the 'tyrant' killed the Duke of Guise the previous year.

=== Captive king ===
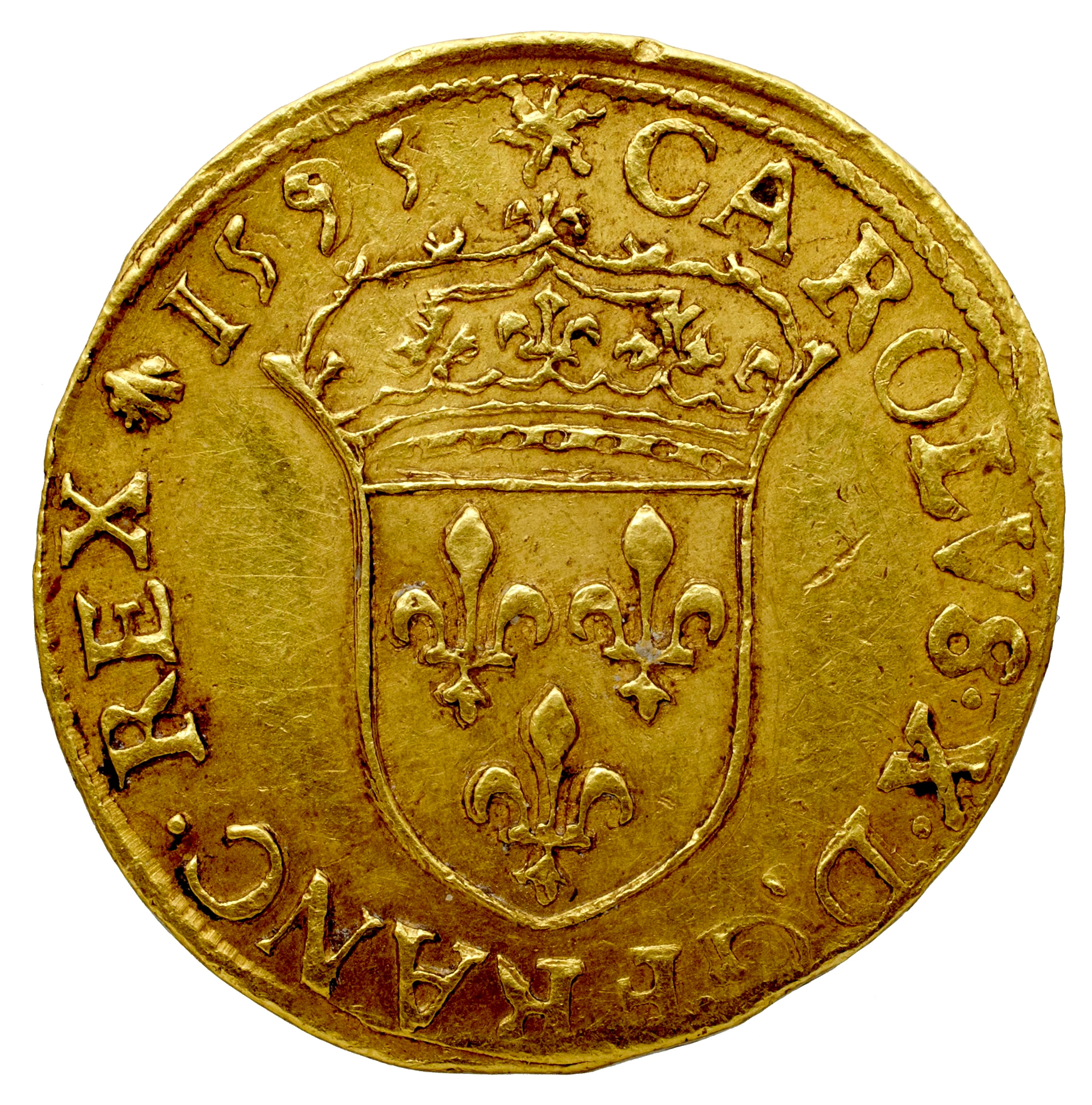
1595 gold coin issued posthumously in Charles X's name

The Catholic League issued coins in his name from 2 August 1589 to his death from 15 Mints, including Paris. Bourbon for his part however, was either uneasy with this radical remaking of the body-politic, or compelled by his captors to make it clear he renounced the royal title and recognised his nephew Henry of Navarre as King Henry IV after the assassination of Henry III. however it did little to affect the League whose loyalty to him was largely a theoretical fig leaf. He died in the castle of Fontenay-le-Comte in May 1590 after suffering a kidney ailment.

=== Succession ===
His death caused a re-orientation in the radical sections of the League, away from rights of succession and towards notions of estate power, that had first been floated during the 1588 Estates General. Other noble factions in the League cared less about who was the new king now Bourbon was dead, than securing their regional powerbases. Due to the demands of the war it would not be until 1593 that a liguer Estates General was summoned to elect his successor. The various Guise grandees jockeyed for ascendency, Charles, Duke of Mayenne and Charles, Duke of Guise both pushed their claims to become king. Mayenne was horrified at the prospect of his young nephew having power over him. The Spanish muscled into the proceedings proposing the estates elect the Infanta Isabella who would be married to Archduke Ernest of Austria. This horrified the estates delegates, who baulked at having a foreign king rule over them. Spain backed down and proposed marrying the Infanta to the Duke of Guise, but it was too late. The estates broke up without a candidate.

== Sources ==
- Andrade, Tonio; Reger, William, eds. (2016). The Limits of Empire: European Imperial Formations in Early Modern World. Routledge.
- Baumgartner, Frederic (1986). Change and Continuity in the French Episcopate: The Bishops and the Wars of Religion 1547-1610.
- Baumgartner, Frederic (1988). Henry II: King of France 1547-1559. Duke University Press.
- Benedict, Philip (2003). Rouen during the Wars of Religion. Cambridge University Press.
- Boltanski, Ariane (2006). Les Ducs de Nevers et L'État Royal: Genèse d'un compromis (ca.1550 - ca 1600). Librairie Droz S.A.
- Carroll, Stuart (2005). Noble Power during the French Wars of Religion: The Guise Affinity and the Catholic Cause in Normandy. Cambridge University Press.
- Carroll, Stuart (2009). Martyrs and Murderers: The Guise Family and the Making of Europe. Oxford University Press.
- Cloulas, Ivan (1985). Henri II. Fayard.
- Diefendorf, Barbara (1991). Beneath the Cross: Catholics and Huguenots in Sixteenth Century Paris. Oxford University Press.
- Durot, Éric (2012). François de Lorraine, duc de Guise entre Dieu et le Roi. Classiques Garnier.
- Holt, Mack P. (2002). The Duke of Anjou and the Politique Struggle During the Wars of Religion. Cambridge University Press.
- Holt, Mack P. (2005). The French Wars of Religion, 1562-1629. Cambridge University Press.
- Holt, Mack (2020). The Politics of Wine in Early Modern France: Religion and Popular Culture in Burgundy 1477-1630. Cambridge University Press.
- Jouanna, Arlette (1998). Histoire et Dictionnaire des Guerres de Religion. Bouquins.
- Jouanna, Arlette (2007). The St Bartholomew's Day Massacre: The Mysteries of a Crime of State. Manchester University Press.
- Knecht, Robert (1994). Renaissance Warrior and Patron: The Reign of Francis I. Cambridge University Press.
- Knecht, Robert (2010). The French Wars of Religion, 1559-1598. Routledge.
- Knecht, Robert (2014). Catherine de' Medici. Routledge.
- Knecht, Robert (2016). Hero or Tyrant? Henry III, King of France, 1574-1589. Routledge.
- Konnert, Mark (2006). Local Politics in the French Wars of Religion: The Towns of Champagne, the Duc de Guise and the Catholic League 1560-1595. Ashgate.
- Martin, A. Lynn (1973). Henry III and the Jesuit Politicians. Librairie Droz.
- Potter, David (1993). War and Government in the French Provinces: Picardy 1470-1560. Cambridge University Press.
- Roberts, Penny (2013). Peace and Authority during the French Religious Wars c.1560-1600. Palgrave Macmillan.
- Roelker, Nancy (1968). Queen of Navarre: Jeanne d'Albret 1528-1572. Harvard University Press.
- Roelker, Nancy (1996). One King, One Faith: The Parlement of Paris and the Religious Reformation of the Sixteenth Century. University of California Press.
- Shimizu, J. (1970). Conflict of Loyalties: Politics and Religion in the Career of Gaspard de Coligny, Admiral of France, 1519–1572. Geneva: Librairie Droz.
- Salmon, J.H.M (1975). Society in Crisis: France during the Sixteenth Century. Metheun & Co.
- Sutherland, Nicola (1962). The French Secretaries of State in the Age of Catherine de Medici. The Athlone Press.
- Sutherland, Nicola (1973). Bosher (ed.). French Government and Society, 1500–1850 Essays in Memory of Alfred Cobban. Athlone Press.
- Sutherland, Nicola (1980). The Huguenot Struggle for Recognition. Yale University Press.
- Thompson, James (1909). The Wars of Religion in France 1559-1576: The Huguenots, Catherine de Medici and Philip II. Chicago University Press.

Charles de Bourbon House of Bourbon Cadet branch of the House of Capet Born: 22 September 1523 Died: 9 May 1590
Preceded by Henry III	— DISPUTED — King of France; 1589–1590; Disputed by Henry III of Navarre; Reason for dispute: French Wars of Religion and Henry's Calvinism	Succeeded by Henry IV as sole claimant, crowned in 1594 after converting to Catholicism
