= Louise de la Béraudière =

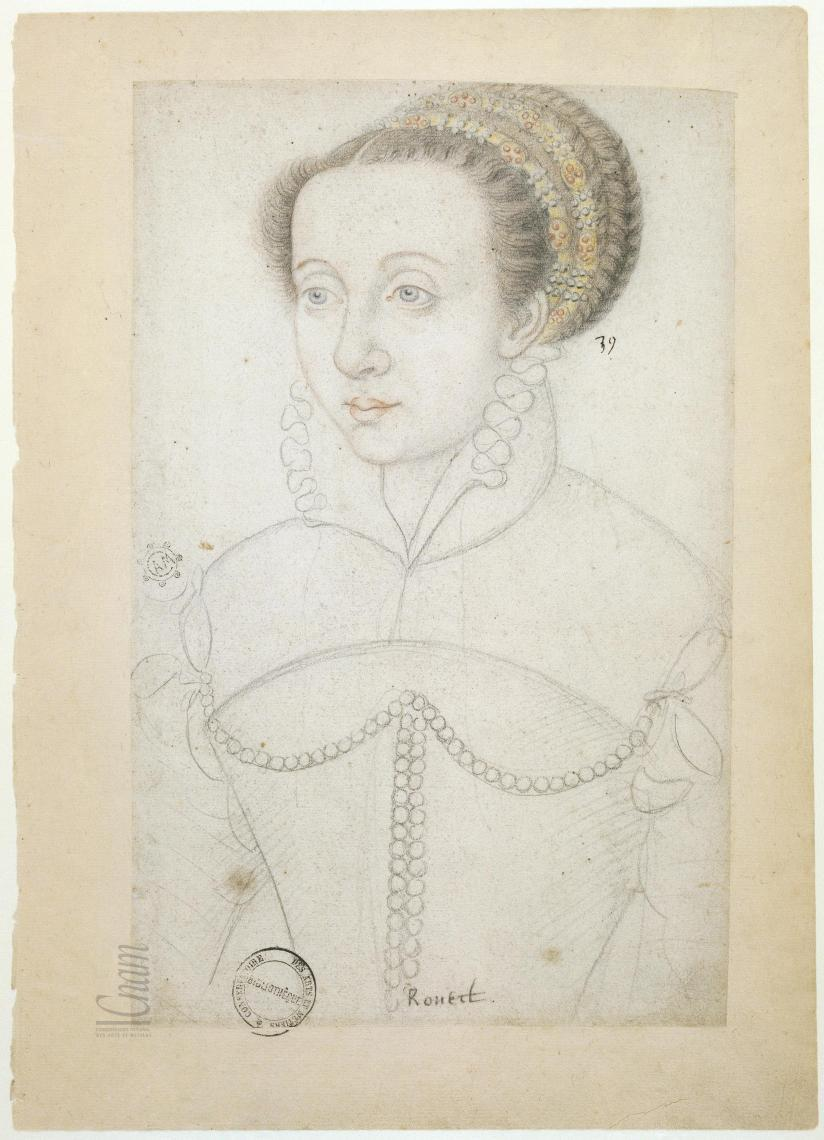
- Born: 1530
- Died: 1611 (aged 80–81)
- Occupation: Maid-of-honour to Catherine de Medici
- Known for: Mistress of Antoine of Navarre
- Title: Dame d'atour to Louise of Lorraine
- Term: 1575–1590
- Predecessor: Margaret de La Marck-Arenberg
- Successor: Leonora Dori
- Children: Charles III de Bourbon
- Parents: René de Béraudière (father); Madeleine du Fou (mother)
- Family: de la Béraudière

Louise de la Béraudière, known as La belle Rouhet (1530–1611) was a French court official. She served as Fille d'honneur to queen Catherine de Medici, and dame d'atour to the queen of France, Louise of Lorraine, from 1575 until 1590. She was known for her affair with king Antoine of Navarre.

== Life ==
She was the daughter of René de Béraudière and Madeleine du Fou. She became maid-of-honour to queen Catherine de Medici. She had an affair with king Antoine of Navarre, and it was believed that it was she who convinced Antoine to return to Catholicism on the mission of Catherine de Medici. She became the mother of Charles III de Bourbon (1554–1610) by Antoine. She left her employment as maid-of-honour and married.

She is also known for her love affairs with Michel de Montaigne and Robert de Combault. She was rumored to have had affairs with both king Charles IX of France and king Henry III of France, but this is unconfirmed.

In 1575, she was appointed Dame d'atour to the new queen. As such it was her task to manage the queen's wardrobe and supervise her 10 chamber maids, but she had also been appointed because of her sense of fashion, and it was her task to advise the queen in how to dress, a task which was important for the fashion-interested king, which she is said to have performed with success.

== Sources ==
- Bryson, David (1999). Queen Jeanne and the Promised Land: Dynasty, Homeland, Religion and Violence in Sixteenth-Century France. Brill.
- Trinquet, Roger (1956). "En Marge des Essais: La Vraie Figure de Madame d'Estissac ou les Pieges de l'Homonymie". Bibliothèque d'Humanisme et Renaissance (in French). 18 (1). Librairie Droz.

Court offices
Preceded by Marguerite de La Marck-Arenberg	Dame d'atour to the Queen of France; 1575–1590	Succeeded by Leonora Dori
