= Charles, Cardinal de Bourbon (born 1562) =

Charles II de Bourbon
- Cardinal, Archbishop of Rouen
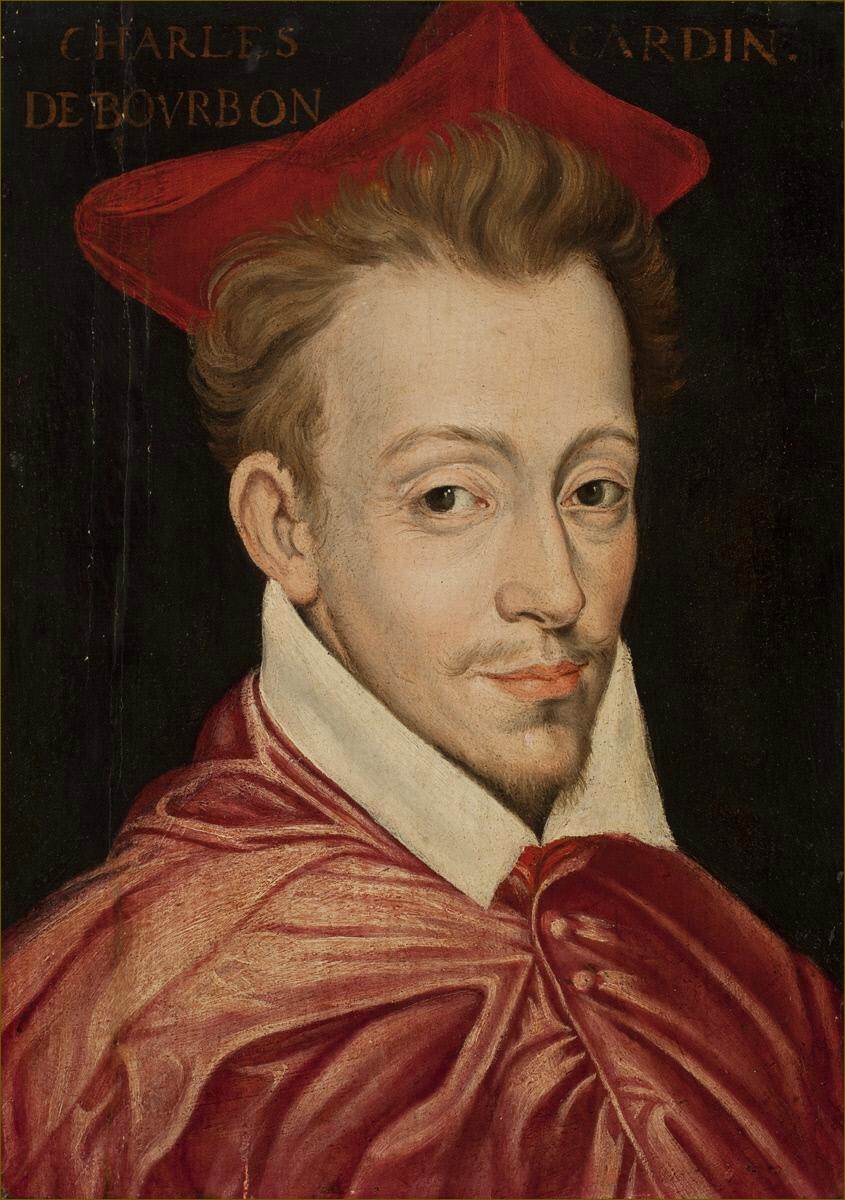
- A 16th century painting of Charles of Bourbon-Vendome.
- Church: Roman Catholic
- In office: 1590–1594
- Predecessor: Charles I de Bourbon
- Successor: Charles III de Bourbon

Orders
- Created cardinal: 12 December 1583 by Pope Gregory XIII
- Rank: Cardinal-deacon

Personal details
- Born: 18 August 1562 Gandelus-en-Brie
- Died: 30 July 1594 (aged 31) Paris

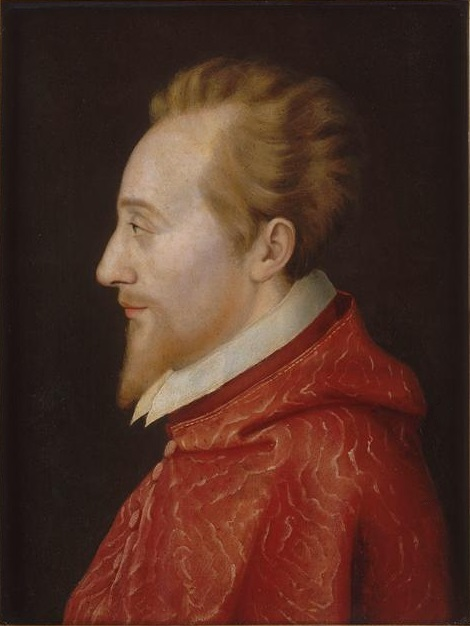
A 17th century portrait of Charles of Bourbon-Vendome.

Charles II of Bourbon (19 August 1562 – 30 July 1594), known as Cardinal de Vendôme and later as Cardinal de Bourbon, was a prince of the blood of the House of Bourbon. When his Protestant cousin became King Henry IV of France in 1589, he raised the hopes of Catholics hostile to the League and was a candidate for the crown of France.

== Family ==
Born August 19, 1562, at Gandelus-en-Brie, Charles was the son of Louis I de Bourbon-Conde, Prince of Conde (uncle of French King Henry IV) and Duke of Enghien, and Eleonore de Roye. He was the nephew of Cardinal Charles de Bourbon.

== Biography ==
He did not receive priestly ordination. Elected coadjutor archbishop of Rouen with right of succession on 1 August 1582, he did not receive episcopal consecration.

He was created cardinal deacon by Pope Gregory XIII in the consistory of December 12, 1583, but he did not receive the red hat or a titular church. He was known as the Cardinal de Vendôme (the name of the branch of the Bourbon family which he came).

He was advisor to King Henry III of France. He was a director of the diocese of Bayeux from 1586 to 1590. In 1589 he was appointed abbot of Saint-Denis in commendam. He also held the commendams of the abbeys of Saint-Germain-des-Prés, Saint-Ouen in Rouen, Bourgueil, St. Catherine of Rouen, St. Pierre of Corbie and Ourscamp.

During the events of the League, he chose, unlike his brothers, to follow his uncle, Charles, Cardinal de Bourbon in his action against the Protestants. He showed himself unfavorable to Henry I, Duke of Guise and according to historian Jacques Auguste de Thou was allegedly used by King Henry III to break the influence that Lorraine had over the Cardinal de Bourbon. In 1588, he participated in the Estates General of Blois.

The principal is the government which remained in Tours during the vacancy of the throne after the death of Henry III. He recognized Henry IV as king and momentarily became Minister of Justice before the king, who feared the ambition of his young cousin's withdraws.

When his uncle died in 1590, he became known as Cardinal de Bourbon. He was appointed archbishop of Rouen (May 9, 1590) in succession to his uncle, but the cathedral chapter refused to acknowledge him. Only after the siege by Henry IV was he accepted. He offered himself as candidate for the throne of France and formed the third party in which were grouped many Catholic nobles unhappy not to see Henry IV to convert to Catholicism. The political interest in the person of Cardinal in 1593, was one of the factors that prompted Henry to convert.

He did not participate in any of the five papal conclaves held while he was a cardinal: 1585 to elect Pope Sixtus V, 1590 to elect Urban VII, 1590 to elect Gregory XIV, 1591 to elect Innocent IX, or 1592 to elect Clement VIII.

He died July 30, 1594, of dropsy at the Abbey of Saint-Germain-des-Prés. He is buried in the monastery of Gaillon.
