= Charles III de Bourbon (archbishop of Rouen) =

Illegitimate son of Antoine, King of Navarre

The Most Reverend Charles III de Bourbon
- Archbishop of Rouen
- Church: Roman Catholic
- Appointed: 26 March 1597
- Term ended: 1 December 1604
- Predecessor: Charles II de Bourbon
- Successor: François de Joyeuse
- Other post: Abbott of Marmoutier
- Previous post: Bishop of Lectoure (1569–97) Bishop of Comminges (1569–97)

Orders
- Consecration: 28 December 1597 by Pierre de Gondi

Personal details
- Born: c. 1554
- Died: 15 June 1610
- Parents: Antoine of Navarre; Louise de la Béraudière

Charles III de Bourbon (c. 1554 – 15 June 1610), was Archbishop of Rouen, and the illegitimate son of Antoine de Bourbon, king of Navarre, and his mistress Louise de La Béraudière du Rouhet. His half-brother was King Henry IV of France.

== Biography ==
On 13 March 1569, Charles was captured by the Catholic forces at the battle of Jarnac. Later that year, he became Bishop of Comminges, then officially bishop of Lectoure in 1590. In both circumstances Charles was an "administrator", since he did not seek to intervene in political or religious life unlike his predecessors. His half-brother Henry tried to establish him as archbishop of Reims in 1591 but he was unable to remove the ecclesiastical see from the control of the House of Guise.

Following Philippe Desportes's refusal of archiepiscopal seat of Rouen, Charles, who was quickly ordained a priest, was elevated to Archbishop of Rouen in 1594. (Note: Vincent J. Pitts states Charles became Archbishop of Rouen in 1597.) In 1599 at the behest of his half-brother Henry, he officiated the wedding of his half-sister Catherine de Bourbon and Henry II, Duke of Lorraine. After briefly making a suggestion to hold the ceremony privately in the king's study, Charles, being overruled, performed the ceremony as instructed.

He kept his position until his resignation in 1604 in favour of Cardinal Francois de Joyeuse. In 1604, he became Abbott of Marmoutier, and was buried there in 1610.

== Sources ==
- Bergin, Joseph (1996). The Making of French Episcopate, 1589-1661. Yale University Press. ISBN 978-0300067514.
- Bryson, David (1999). Queen Jeanne and the Promised Land: Dynasty, Homeland, Religion and Violence in Sixteenth-Century France. Brill.
- Lelong, Charles (1987). "L'abbatiale de Marmoutier au Xe siècle". Bulletin Monumental (in French). tome 145, n°2 (2): 165–171. doi:10.3406/bulmo.1987.2921.
- Pitts, Vincent J. (2009). Henri IV of France: His Reign and Age. The Johns Hopkins University Press.
