= François de Joyeuse =

French churchman (1562–1615)

His Eminence François de Joyeuse
- Cardinal, Archbishop of Rouen; Primate of Normandy
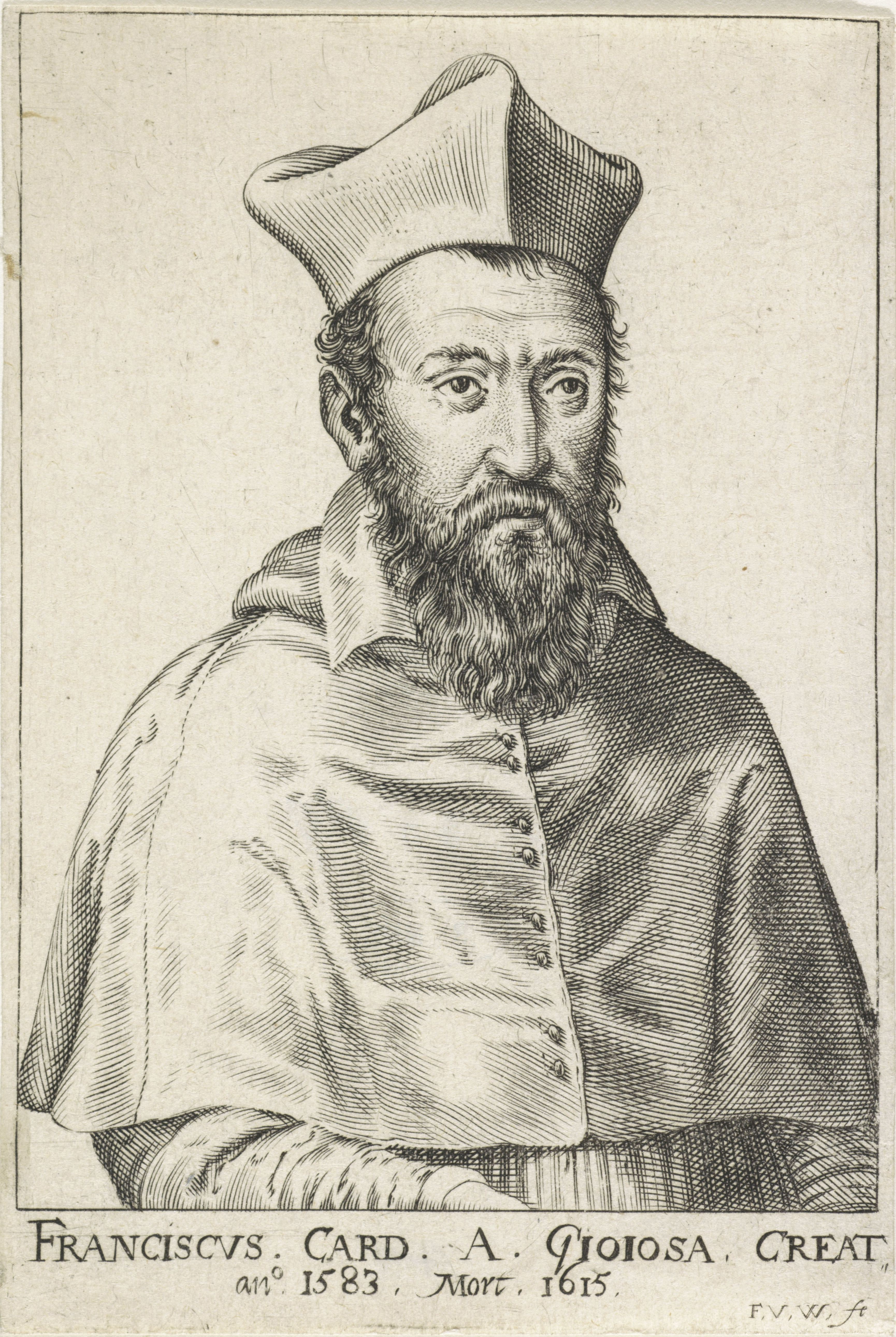
- Church: Roman Catholic
- Archdiocese: Rouen
- In office: 1604–1615
- Predecessor: Charles III de Bourbon
- Successor: François II de Harlay
- Other posts: Cardinal-Bishop of Ostia e Velletri (1611–15); Prefect of the Congregation of Bishops and Regulars (1605–15)
- Previous posts: Cardinal-Bishop of Sabina; Cardinal-Priest of San Pietro in Vincoli; Archbishop of Toulouse; Cardinal-Priest of Santissima Trinità al Monte Pincio; San Silvestro in Capite; Archbishop of Narbonne

Orders
- Created cardinal: 12 December 1583 by Pope Gregory XIII
- Rank: Cardinal-Bishop

Personal details
- Born: 24 June 1562 Carcassonne, France
- Died: 23 August 1615 (aged 53) Avignon, Papal States
- Coat of arms

François de Joyeuse (24 June 1562 – 23 August 1615) was a French churchman and politician.

== Biography ==
Born at Carcassonne, François de Joyeuse was the second son of Guillaume de Joyeuse and Marie Eléanor de Batarnay. As the younger son of a seigneur in an intensely religious family of bishops and soldiers, he was destined for a career in the church. He studied in Toulouse, then at the Collège de Navarre, Paris, and received his doctorate degrees in canon and civil law at the University of Orléans. Thanks to the influence of his elder brother Anne de Joyeuse, a favourite of King Henry III of France who created him duke and peer in 1581, he became a privy councillor to the King and rose rapidly in the church. He was made Archbishop of Narbonne on 20 October 1581 (with a papal dispensation for not having reached canonical age), a cardinal on 12 December 1583 (still aged only 21), Archbishop of Toulouse on 4 November 1588, and Archbishop of Rouen on 1 December 1604. He was a Knight of the Order of the Holy Spirit.

His brothers Anne and Claude were captured in 1587 after the Battle of Coutras and killed in the general massacre that followed. As a result, François became Duke of Joyeuse. In 1590 the title of Duke of Joyeuse was passed to another of his younger brothers, Scipion, who drowned himself in the Tarn after the defeat of Villemur in 1592, then to Henri de Joyeuse, the youngest brother, who died in 1608. The title passed to Henri's daughter Henriette, who had married Henri de Montpensier in 1597.

On 16 February 1587 he was appointed by Henry III French minister to the Holy See, cardinal protector of France; he retained his predecessor's secretary, Arnaud d'Ossat, a skilled diplomat with long experience in Rome who served as liaison with the papacy during Joyeuse's numerous absences. Joyeuse returned to France after King Henry's murder in 1589 and joined the Catholic League. However, he broke with the League in 1593 to support Henry of Navarre (King Henry IV of France), and returned to Rome where he obtained papal absolution for Henry from Pope Clement VIII in 1595. Reappointed cardinal protector in January 1596, he returned to France and was returned to Rome by Henry IV in September 1598, arriving the following February; that year he negotiated the annulment of King Henry's marriage to Marguerite de Valois, opening the way for a second marriage to Marie de' Medici.

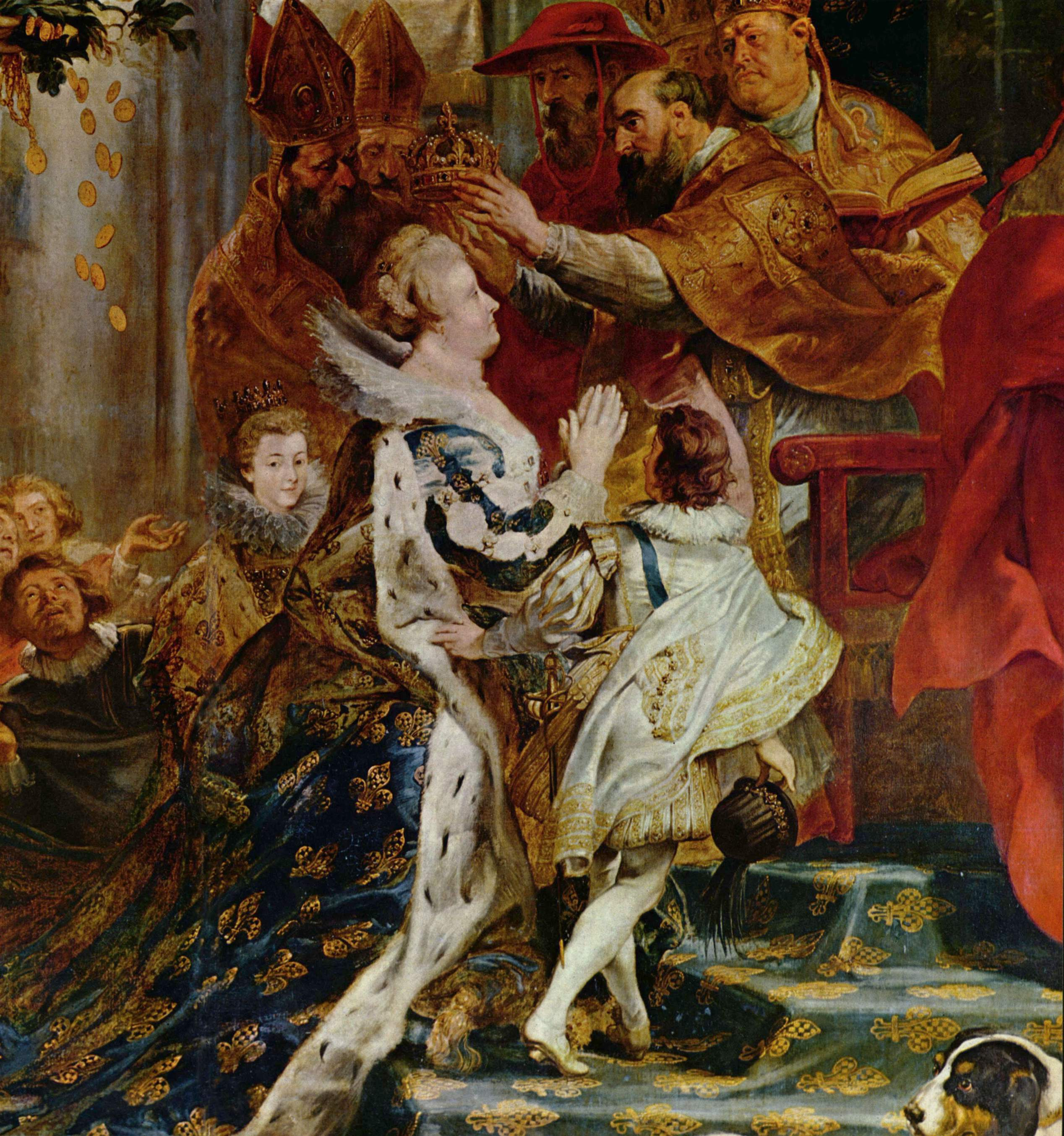
Peter Paul Rubens: Cardinal François de Joyeuse anoints Queen Dowager Marie de' Medici, 1610.

François became Archbishop of Rouen in 1604, though he did not take up residence. He participated in the papal conclaves of 1605. Between 1606 and 1607 he played a decisive role in negotiating a rapprochement between the Papacy and Venice, at the time of the Venetian Interdict. After the murder of Henry IV in 1610 he lost influence at the court of the Regent, Marie de' Medici. He died at Avignon, aged 53, while travelling to Rome.
