= Gandelu =

- Commune
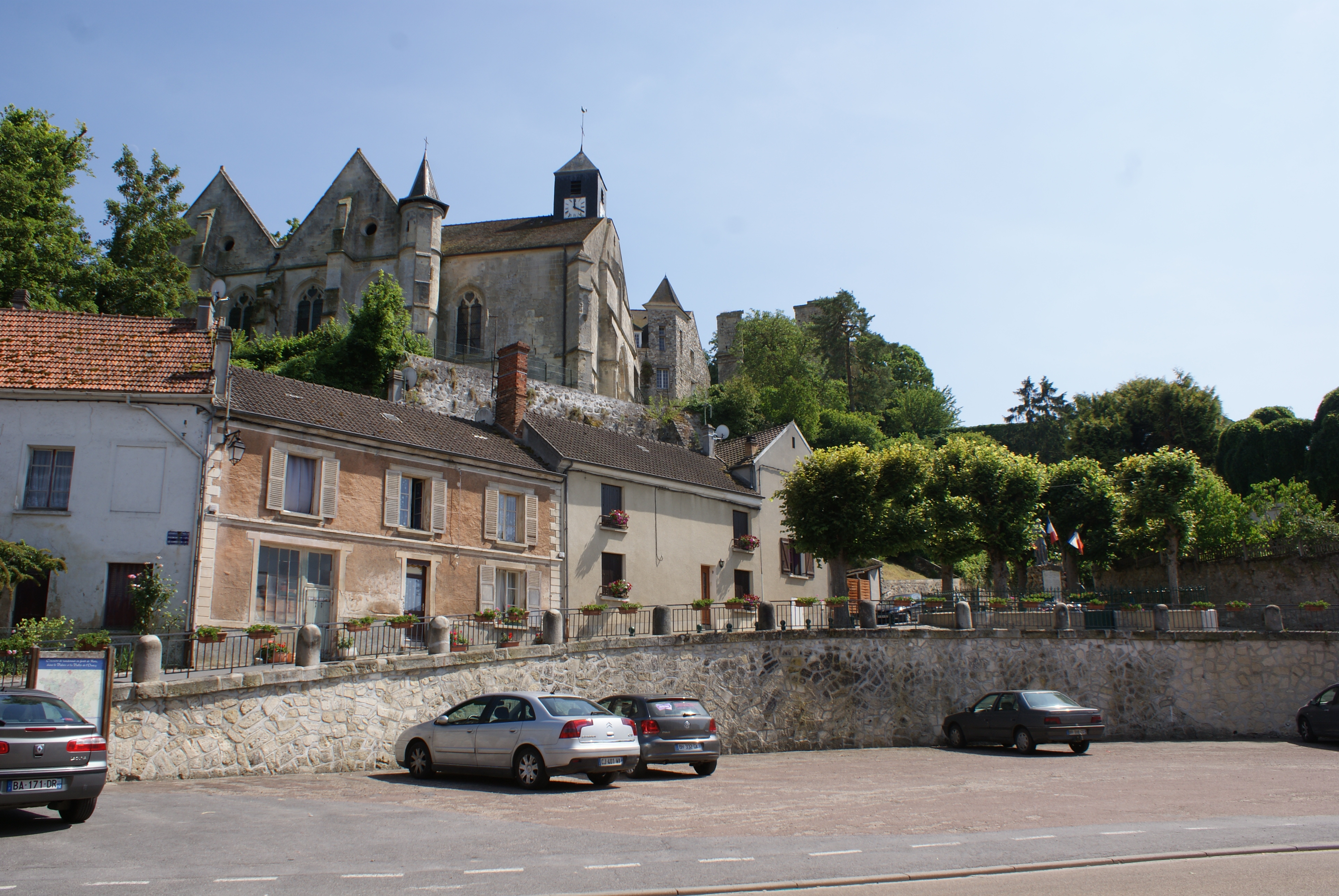
- The church and square of Gandelu
- Location of Gandelu
- Location within France Location within Hauts-de-France
- Coordinates: 49°05′44″N 3°11′02″E
- Country: France
- Region: Hauts-de-France
- Department: Aisne
- Arrondissement: Château-Thierry
- Canton: Villers-Cotterêts
- Intercommunality: CA Région de Château-Thierry

Government
  - Mayor (2026–32): Caroline Barriere
- Area^{1}: 10.03 km^{2} (3.87 sq mi)
- Elevation: 77 m (253 ft)
- Highest elevation: 166 m (545 ft)
- Lowest elevation: 68 m (223 ft)
- Population (2023): 683
  - Density: 68.1/km^{2} (176/sq mi)
- Time zone: UTC+01:00 (CET)
  - Summer (DST): UTC+02:00 (CEST)
- INSEE/Postal code: 02339 /02810
- ^{1} French Land Register data, which excludes lakes, ponds, glaciers > 1 km^{2} (0.386 sq mi or 247 acres) and river estuaries.

Gandelu (French pronunciation: [ɡɑ̃dly]) is a commune in the Aisne department in Hauts-de-France in northern France. It belongs to the arrondissement of Château-Thierry and to the canton of Villers-Cotterêts.

== Population ==
Historical population
Year	Pop.	±% p.a.
1968	326	—
1975	291	−1.61%
1982	346	+2.50%
1990	537	+5.65%
1999	641	+1.99%
2007	675	+0.65%
2012	686	+0.32%
2017	687	+0.03%
2023	683	−0.10%
Source: INSEE

== See also ==
- Communes of the Aisne department
