= Siege of Rouen (1562) =

Siege in Rouen, France in 1562

- Part of First French War of Religion (1562–1563)
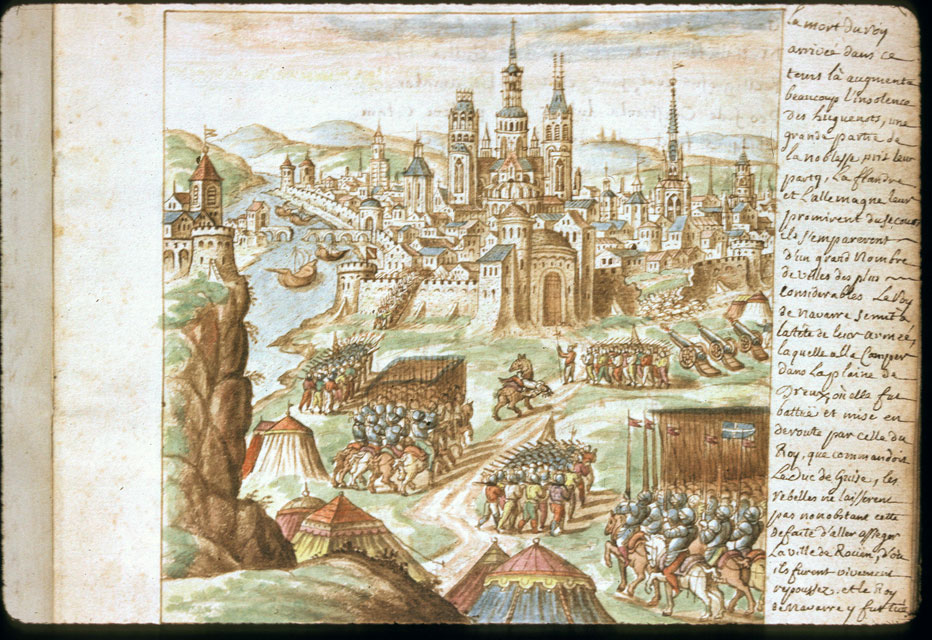
- Siege of Rouen and the death of Antoine of Navarre
Date	28 May – 26 October 1562
Location	Rouen 49.4428°N 1.0886°E
Result	Crown victory

Belligerents
French crown	Rebels; Kingdom of England

Commanders and leaders
Claude, Duke of Aumale; Antoine of Navarre †; Francis, Duke of Guise	Seigneur de Morvillier; Gabriel de Lorges, 1st Earl of Montgomery

Strength
First siege: 3,000; Second siege: 30,000	First siege: 4,000 garrison Second siege: 4,000 garrison with 500 English

Casualties and losses
Unknown	At least 1,000 killed in sacking

The siege of Rouen was a key military engagement of the first French War of Religion. After having been seized by those opposing the crown on 16 April, the siege, beginning on 28 May and culminating on 26 October brought the important city of Rouen back into the crown's control. The fall of Rouen would set the stage for the main battle of the war at Dreux several months later.

== Background ==
=== Rouen in the 1560s ===
==== The city and its religious communities ====
At the time of the siege, Rouen was one of the leading cities of France representing both a commercial centre in its function as a port city and also an administrative capital, home to a Parlement. Protestantism had come to the city in the 1520s as an unstructured movement, gaining a cohesive form with the invitation of a Calvinist preacher to the community in 1557. By 1562 the community had reached a strength of 15,000 members, making it a sizeable minority in the town, particularly among artisans.

The growth of Calvinism in the city inspired a reactive change in the town's more hardline Catholic population, with the Rouen Confraternity of the Holy Sacrament established in the city in 1561 to defend transubstantiation from the ideological attacks it was increasingly being subject to. The ultra-Catholic Guise faction which was increasingly influential in the wider region of Normandy could also count on several allies in the city including the President of the Parlement Louis Pétremol, the Procurer Général Jean Péricard and the Bailli Villebon d'Estouteville. This influence was however counterbalanced in the Calvinist Governor of Normandy the Duke of Bouillon.

Rouen's Parlement and elite more generally were dominated by moderate Catholics, as such upon the issuing of the Edict of Saint-Germain in Jan 1562 that granted limited toleration to Protestant worship, the Rouen Parlement would be the first to ratify it, whilst the Paris Parlement resisted until March. Meanwhile the Council of 24, the chief governmental apparatus of the town itself was divided, its 7 elected Conselliers-Échevins split between 4 Calvinists and 3 Catholics.

==== Religious conflict ====
Beginning with the Affair of the Placards in the reign of Francis I, Protestantism was subject to organised persecution in France. This continued through the reign of Henry II and Francis II, however with the latter's early death the regency of Catherine de' Medici for her young son Charles IX offered a new policy of limited toleration. Frequent heresy trials would be a feature of Rouen life from the 1530-50s, the nascent community’s first preacher being forced to flee the kingdom after an order of banishment in 1546. With a Parlement order of execution for any Calvinist minister arrested, and the seizing of the property of anyone found to be hosting an assembly many converts chose to flee to Geneva prior to 1559.

Those converts that chose to remain however were not idle, beginning in 1535 sporadic acts of iconoclasm and placard distribution were recorded. Illegal gatherings for worship likewise continued, and by 1560 they were confident enough in their numbers to gather publicly and sing psalms. When the Cardinal Charles de Bourbon visited the town he was heaped with insults and had his pulpit vandalised, At Lent in 1562 the Calvinists destroyed the Cathedral Portal while a Franciscan was preaching and then invaded the building to insult him. With the continuation of executions for heresy the Calvinists organised several prison breaks for their comrades in 1560, even pulling down another of their flock from the stake in 1561 despite the city’s attempt to move the execution grounds to a more secure site.

=== Wassy and the beginning of civil war ===
==== National events ====
It was in this context of religious tension in Rouen that national events would propel matters into open violence. On 1 March 1562 while travelling from his estates at Joinville to Paris, Francis, Duke of Guise committed a Massacre of Huguenot worshippers in the town of Wassy. This done he ignored the regent Catherine's demands to come to court and explain himself, going instead to Paris where he received a heroes welcome for his actions. Fearing the potential violence of both the Duke of Guise and his Calvinist enemy the Prince of Condé being present in the city, Catherine ordered them both to vacate, but only Condé obeyed. The Duke of Guise and his Triumvir allies, having met prior to his entry to Paris on 12 March then headed to Fontainebleau where they took possession of the King and Regent. While Catherine, realising the vulnerability of her position had previously requested Condé come to her defence, he instead headed towards Orléans seizing it on 2 April and issuing a manifesto for his revolt on 8 April. Condé's intended strategy was to seize a network of strategic town's and utilise this to force a favourable settlement. To this end local Huguenots in centres across France were encouraged to seize control of their cities, with Tours, Blois, Montpellier and Rouen among others falling to the rebels over the following months.

==== Local events ====
News of the massacre of Wassy and subsequent actions by the Duke of Guise reached Rouen quickly, inducing a climate of fear and militancy among the town's Huguenots. Coupled with the event of the previous September in which Pierre Quitard of Bourges was executed in Rouen for possessing a list of the town's 400 leading Huguenots there was fear that this presaged a similar massacre in Rouen. Letters circulated in the Huguenot circles warning of the need to be ready to support their fellow churches with arms if necessary, and armed guards began to protect their local assemblies.

The nearby town of Dieppe fell to a Huguenot coup on 22 March, and with the outbreak of formal hostilities in April Claude, Duke of Aumale was given special authority in the Normandy region as Lieutenant General with his deputy Matignon. This angered the Governor of Normandy the Duke of Bouillon who, while not allying with Condé, endeavoured to assert his local authority by besieging Matignon in Cherbourg catching him off guard. Over the months of April and May much of the urban centres of Normandy would fall to those opposing the crown including Le Havre, Vire and Rouen.

== The siege ==
=== Prelude ===
==== Incident of the captains ====
On 7 April, two Catholic captains, Nicolas le Gras and Nicolas Maze, under the authority of the Triumvirate, entered Rouen and began to drum the streets for recruits to fight for the crown against Condé. Fearful that any raised troops would be used against them the Huguenots of the town set upon them killing le Gras and wounding Maze who managed to escape the town. The Huguenots of the town justified their actions in a remonstrance to the Duke of Bouillon later in April citing their concern that the recruiters were operating as agents of the Guise client the baron de Clères.

==== The coup of 15 April ====
In the wake of this violent action on 13 April, the Bailli of Rouen, the Guisard Villebon d'Estouteville returned to the city. In the later partisan account of the Histoire Ecclesiastique the Huguenots would assert that he had been plotting their extermination and their actions had been to forestall this, however it is notable that this occurred during a wave of town coups across France. On the night of 15 April the town's Huguenots acted, first seizing the convent of the Celestines, then the town hall before besieging Estoubeville in his chateau. He was quickly forced to surrender and flee the town, leaving the Huguenots in control. The Catholics of Rouen had been caught completely by surprise, and soon power would be consolidated with Huguenot control of the gates and a Protestant dominated night watch.

The rebel elite did not announce allegiance to Condé but rather to the King, justifying their rebellion on preventative grounds to avoid a new Wassy. Those Catholic members of the Council of 24 were allowed to continue to hold office, the largely Catholic Parlement continued to sit and a soldier who had injured the Prior of the Celestines during the coup was executed.

On 19 April, the Duke of Bouillon arrived in front of the city hoping to talk down the rebels, he was however unable to do so and frustrated left his lieutenant Charles de Bacqueville-Martel in the city and departed.

==== Internal radicalisation ====
Inside the town, a fraught dynamic quickly developed between the moderate rebels and those who wished to go further, a split in part on lines of class between the elders and the artisan converts. On 3–4 May a wave of systematic iconoclasm swept the city with armed Protestants breaking into churches to destroy the altars, smash icons and loot precious metals. The iconoclasts further invaded the houses of members of the Catholic elite, in particular those members associated with the Guise, seizing what arms they found in them.

The Huguenot elite would quickly distance themselves from the actions, writing a formal apology in which they asserted it had been a spontaneous outbreak led by children. The letter would however go on to point out that the act must demonstrate divine displeasure with the display of idolatry, providing a degree of tacit endorsement. Further reports of the iconoclasm being conducted in bands also suggest a degree of organisation.

Regardless of elite involvement the council soon commissioned Nicolas de l'Isle a Mantire de la Mornau with the responsibility of collecting, weighing and melting down the looted gold plate. The total value came to 57,934 Livres and would be used to pay for the costs of garrisoning and defending the city, though it only provided enough for a month’s wages.

The fallout of the iconoclasm arrived over the following days with first leading Catholic merchants and priests departing the city and then on 10 May the Parlement departing, declaring it no longer safe. Those 3 Catholic Conseillers-Échevins ceased attendance of the Council of 24 leaving the Huguenots in more total political control and with a reduced council until the July elections. Martel, the Duke of Bouillon's representative in the town departed on 14 May in response to the prior events, leaving it without a crown representative entirely.

=== The first siege ===
==== Arrival of the Duke of Aumale ====
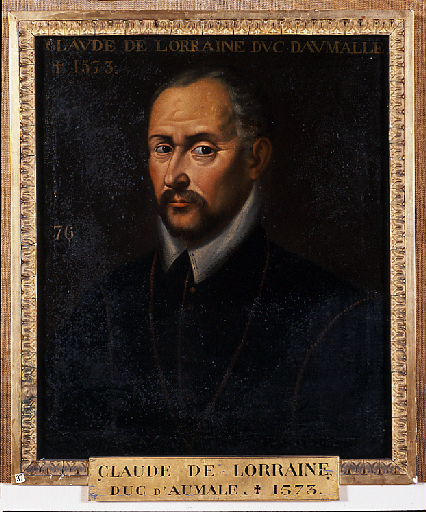
Claude, Duke of Aumale, leader of the first siege

Starting in April and continuing after the wave of iconoclasm in May, Catherine sought a negotiated settlement with the rebels of Rouen, proposing a readmission of the crown's officials in return for leniency for the rebels. This proposal ran afoul of the Catholic hardliners at court upon whom Catherine's power was dependant and the rebels, who wanted the Duke of Aumale's recently given commission over Normandy revoked as part of any deal, as such it came to nought. The Duke of Aumale himself arrived at the gates of Rouen on 28 May and summoned the city to yield to him but the rebels refused. Aumale began a siege, but having only 3,000 men to his command and no siege guns, his bombardment of the town was ineffectual. After several days he was compelled to break camp when the garrison of the town was reinforced by the arriving forces of the Seigneur de Morvillier. Morvillier would assume leadership of the defence of the town.

==== Stalemate and local fighting ====
With the failure of the direct siege and the continued absence of the main royal army, Aumale changed tactics, beginning a campaign of harassment and trying to counteract forays from the town. Short on funds for his troops he seized cloth from Rouennais merchants in Brionne and commissioned the élu of Rouen to collect the décimis tax for him. He further armed and encouraged the peasantry around the towns of Rouen and Dieppe in the hopes they would fight back against any attempted sorties from Rouen and hamper reinforcement efforts.

Meanwhile Protestant reinforcements continued to make their way into the city of Rouen in preparation for a renewed siege later in the year. The troops proved prone to robbing the locals of the town and in their sorties into the surrounding area looted the nearby towns of Elbeuf, Caudebec-lès-Elbeuf and Darnétal in iconoclastic raids. Among these troops arrived Gabriel de Lorges, 1st Earl of Montgomery who received a commission from Condé in August to assume leadership of the defence of the town, tying it closer to the larger rebellion. His large taxation on his coreligionists in the town left him unpopular, some demanding the return of Martel.

==== Spiralling radicalisation ====
On 22 July, the Parlement of Rouen reconvened at Louviers as a rump, now more aligned with the ultra-Catholic faction that had previously been in the minority among its members, with ties to Aumale through Péricard. New laws were issued sanctioning the detaining of all heretics, and should they resist arrest, their summary execution. Further the destruction of church property was to be punishable by the forfeit of all property. The hanging of otherwise non-combatant Huguenots led the royal council to intervene in August, sending Michel de Castelnau to intervene and put a stop to what they felt was excessive brutality.

The authorities of Rouen retaliated to these moves, with the remaining leading Catholics in the city either forced to convert to Protestantism or being imprisoned, the property of those who had fled now seized by the city. Any Catholic services had already ceased in the city during the month of June. In the 4 July elections for the Council of 24 the vacant three seats were filled, providing a full Huguenot council.

==== Appeals to the English ====
With the Royal Army beginning to move North on a path to clear the Loire, and Catholic Breton troops entering Normandy, the city began to consider reaching out abroad for aid. On 15 August a deputy of the city and the Vidame of Chartres headed to England to entreat Elizabeth I's support, several weeks later with the fall of Bourges to the Royal Army an urgent appeal was sent to her. Finally on 20 September the Treaty of Hampton Court was finalised between the Prince of Condé and Elizabeth with Le Havre being offered to the English in return for a 6,000 man relief force for the towns of Rouen and Dieppe. Focusing first on securing Le Havre, it would not be until 4 October that the first 200 troops arrived at Rouen, by which time the city was already under siege, only another 300 troops would ever arrive by which time the city would be on the cusp of falling. While more had been intended one of the 6 ships the English used to transport troops up the river to Rouen had struck a sandbar and was quickly intercepted by Damville.

In disgust at the treaty, several Protestant notables of Rouen would defect to the crown and depart from the city in September. Among those who disapproved of negotiation would be Morvillier, who ceded command of the defence of the town to the recently arrived Montgomery.

=== The second siege ===
==== Arrival of the Royal Army ====
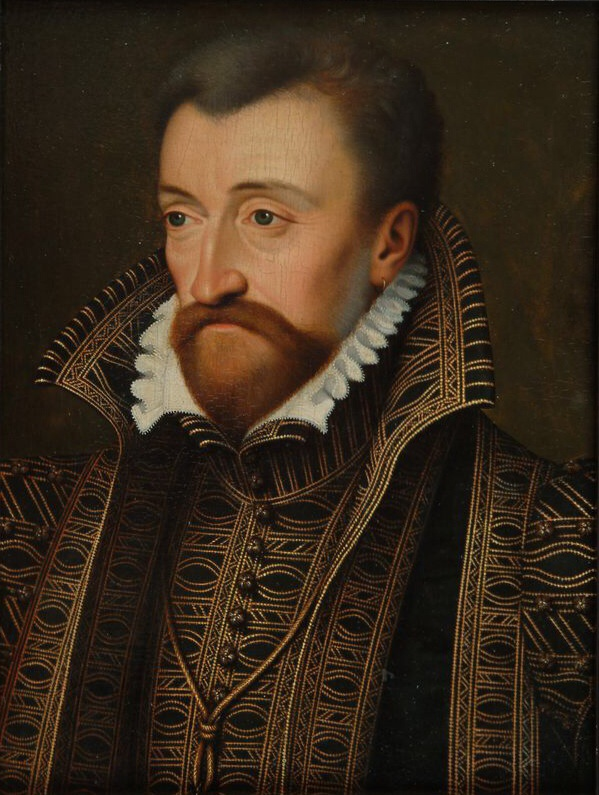
Antoine, King of Navarre, leader of the second siege

Having successfully subdued Bourges in early September, the Royal Army made the decision to bypass Orléans and begin a second siege of Rouen, aware of the recently signed treaty with Elizabeth and desiring to pre-empt any English reinforcements from reaching the city. Arriving at the city on 28 September they established a comprehensive siege with 30,000 men under Antoine of Navarre. Outside of its walls the city was principally defended by the Fort Sainte Catherine which commanded access from the South East and overlooked the town.

==== The death of Navarre ====
On 13 October, while inspecting the siege trenches, Navarre was mortally wounded by a musket shot to his shoulder. Though he was attended by the famous surgeon Ambroise Paré, he could not be saved, and died of his wound on 17 November. It was reported that his last rites were taken in the Lutheran custom and thus rumours of his religious un-orthodoxy despite fighting for the crown would accompany his passing. With his death leadership of the siege effort passed to the Duke of Guise.

==== Fall of Fort Sainte Catherine ====
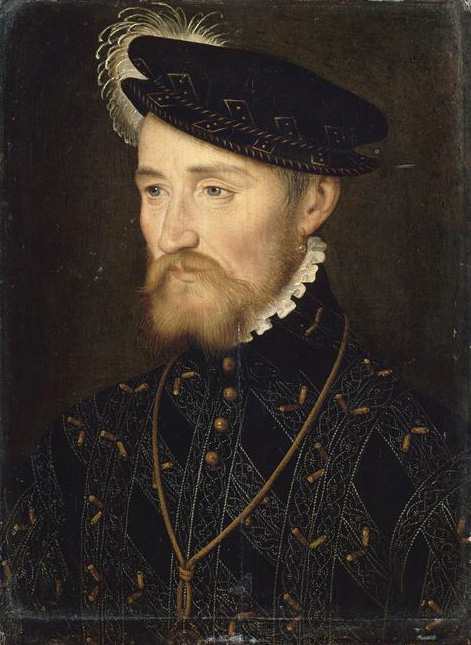
Francis, Duke of Guise, leader of the second siege after the death of Navarre

Soon after Navarre's wounding, the citadel fort of Saint Catherine fell to the besiegers, making it only a matter of time until the city itself capitulated. The assault of the fort had been bitterly contested, lasting seven hours, with Montgomery threatening execution for any deserters. At this time, laughing off the protestations of the Duke of Guise and Anne de Montmorency, Catherine came to the fort to confer with the two captains and survey the city. Concerned about the potential power that would concentrate in the hands of Guise if total victory was achieved, and desiring the rich city of Rouen remained an intact inheritance for her son, Catherine continued to seek a negotiated end to the siege. While the merchants and bourgeois of the city were keen to accept such an offer, the military commander Montgomery, backed by the city’s artisans and refugees from elsewhere in Normandy rejected her advances. They proposed instead a counter offer which included a provision that all Protestant ministers in the city be allowed to remain, which was unacceptable to the besiegers.

==== Assault and sack ====
On 21 October, a week after assuming command, the Duke of Guise ordered an all-out assault on the city's walls. After five days of assault, a breach was achieved on 26 October with mining and explosive charges creating a hole in the wall large enough for a horse to ride through. The Duke, as keen as Catherine to avoid a sack promised double pay to all the troops present on condition of maintained discipline. Fearful of what was to come some of the city’s leaders fled in the dark of the night or on boats down the Seine. Over the next three days, the city was subject to massacre and looting with Huguenot homes and Catholic churches alike being pillaged by the soldiers. The Spanish ambassador Chantonnay estimated that a thousand died in the sacking. Some of those who survived found themselves going as far as Paris to buy back their possessions that the soldiers had pawned.

== Aftermath ==
=== The end of the first war ===
With the fall of Rouen, only the key city of Orléans remained a threat to Paris and the royal cause. The royal army, outnumbering Condé's, failed to prevent a linkup between his force and German mercenary reinforcements brought across France by François de Coligny d'Andelot but were able to pre-empt his march on Paris leading to him turning North instead, hoping to link up with the English who had the funds he critically needed to pay his troops. As he marched North into Normandy he was intercepted and brought to battle at Dreux a decisive victory for the crown that forced the rebels to retreat into the city of Orléans. Having lost Montmorency as a prisoner and their other leader Jacques d'Albon, Seigneur de Saint André on the field of Dreux, Guise was now left in sole command of the crowns war effort, and despite Catherines desire for a negotiated settlement sought a decisive engagement with a victory at Orléans. Establishing a siege, Guise brought it close to conclusion, before he was assassinated shortly prior to the final assault, allowing Condé, Montmorency and Catherine to establish the compromise Edict of Amboise which brought the first war of religion to a close.

With matters temporarily settled between the rebels and the crown, a unified front was created to expel the English who had occupied the towns of Le Havre and Dieppe. On 28 July Le Havre was finally reconquered finishing the re-establishment of French control.

=== Continued enmities ===
After the fall of Rouen, the rump Parlement of Louviers returned to the city, re-establishing itself. It voided the July Council of 24 election on the grounds of excluding Catholics and established a new election, which would see no Huguenot councillors elected, none would ever hold office on the council again. While the Parlement wanted harsh reprisals Catherine pushed for a conciliatory line, with four leaders to be executed and a forced loan of 140,000 écus to be extracted from the city to prop up the crowns finances. Once the royal administration had moved on from the city the local authorities went further, disarming all Huguenots in the town and mandating a special tax for Protestants to pay to fix the damage in the wall. An all Catholic militia was formed, and members of the Parlement who suggested their Huguenot colleagues be allowed to return to their former office were threatened on the street.

Despite the damages done to the community the Huguenots of Rouen rebounded quickly, reaching their pre-siege population levels by 1564. However, they would obtain few new converts from this point forward and the community would increasingly find itself forming a well defined group with different naming and social practices. As late as the 1580s, the Huguenots would find their 1562 iconoclasm blamed for plague. The Edict of Amboise would only be enforced after a series of violent murders and confrontations in April, and further violent incidents would continue in the city up to the 1572 massacre of Huguenots inspired by the St. Bartholomew's Day massacre.

== See also ==
- 1559–1562 French political crisis
- French Wars of Religion
- First French War of Religion (1562–1563)
- First French War of Religion in the provinces
- Battle of Dreux
- Massacre of Vassy
- St. Bartholomew's Day massacre
