= Marmoutier Abbey =

Marmoutier Abbey may refer to:

- Marmoutier Abbey, Alsace
- Marmoutier Abbey, Tours
