= Antoine of Navarre =

King of Navarre from 1555 to 1562

Antoine
- Duke of Vendôme
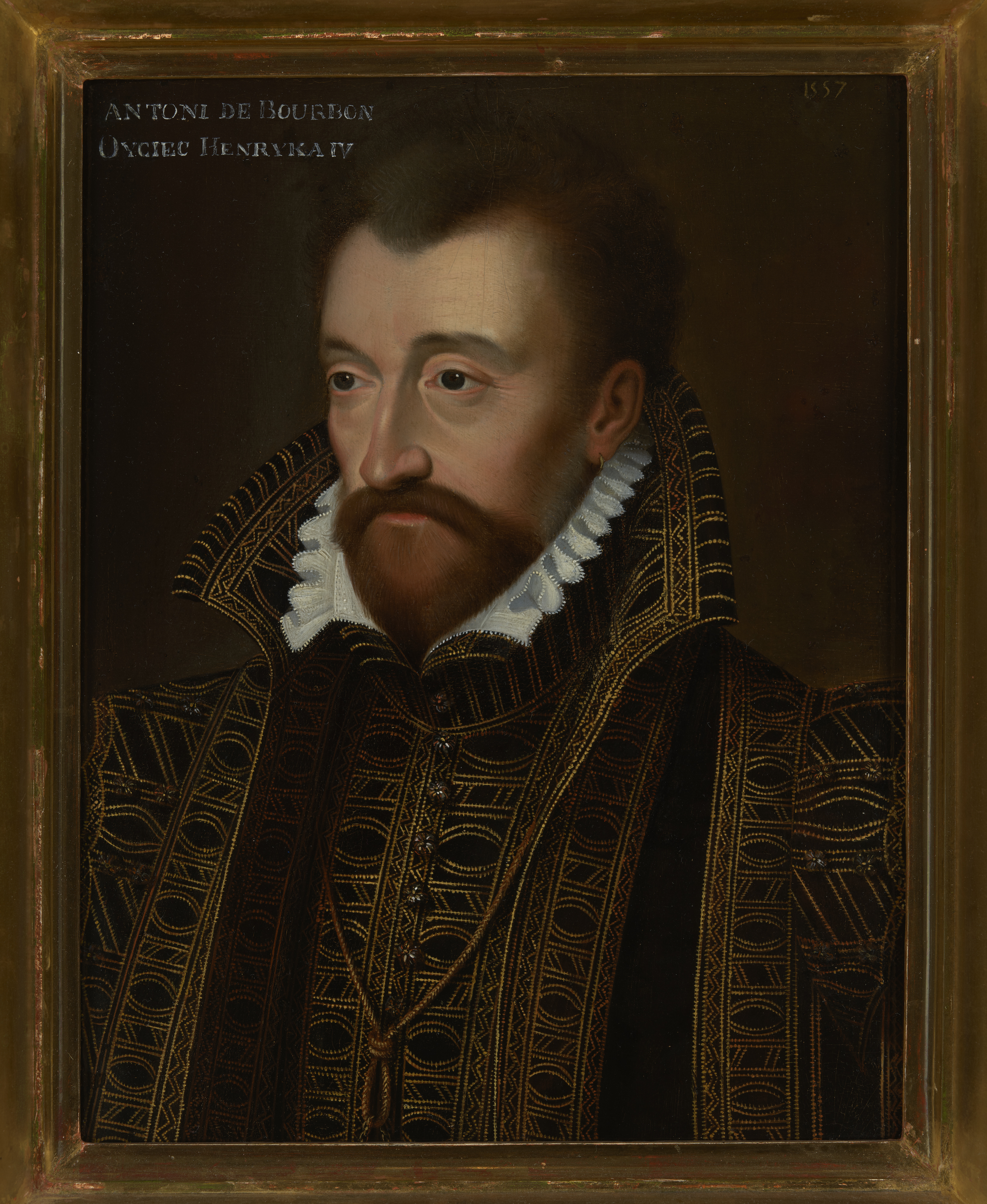
- Portrait, 1557

King of Navarre
- Reign: 25 May 1555 – 17 November 1562
- Predecessor: Henry II
- Successor: Jeanne III
- Co-monarch: Jeanne III
- Born: 22 April 1518; La Fère, Picardy, France
- Died: 17 November 1562 (aged 44); Les Andelys, Normandy, France
- Burial: Vendôme
- Spouse: Jeanne III of Navarre (m. 1548)
- Issue among others...: Henry IV of France; Catherine, Hereditary Princess of Lorraine; Charles, Archbishop of Rouen (ill.)
Names
- French: Antoine de Bourbon; Spanish: Antonio de Borbón
- House: Bourbon-Vendôme
- Father: Charles, Duke of Vendôme
- Mother: Françoise of Alençon

Antoine (Spanish: Antonio; Basque: Antonio; 22 April 1518 – 17 November 1562), sometimes called Antoine of Bourbon, was King of Navarre from 1555 until his death in 1562 as the husband and co-ruler of Queen Jeanne III. He was the first monarch of the House of Bourbon, of which he became head in 1537. Despite being first prince of the blood in France, Navarre lacked political influence and was dominated by King Henry II of France's favourites, the Montmorency and Guise families. When Henry II died in 1559, Navarre found himself sidelined in the Guise-dominated government, and then compromised by his brother's treason. When Henry's son, King Francis II of France, soon died in turn, Navarre returned to the centre of politics, becoming Lieutenant-General of France and leading the army of the crown in the first of the French Wars of Religion. He died of wounds sustained during the Siege of Rouen. He was the father of King Henry IV, France's first Bourbon king.

== Early life ==
Coat of Arms of Antoine of Bourbon and the Kings of Navarre

Antoine of Bourbon was born at La Fère, Picardy, France, the second son of Charles of Bourbon, Duke of Vendôme (1489–1537), and his wife, Françoise d'Alençon (died 1550). He was the older brother of Louis of Bourbon, Prince of Condé, who would lead the Huguenots during the early French Wars of Religion.

== Reign of Henri II and Francis II ==
=== Henri II ===
Antoine found himself in a disadvantageous position in the court of Henri, due to the disgrace that had befallen his house after the defection of Charles III, Duke of Bourbon to Charles V in 1523. Regardless, he was able to secure the kingship of Navarre jure uxoris in 1555. In the same year the critical border governorship of Picardy was removed from him and given to Admiral Coligny arousing significant protest. However, he was bought off with the rich southern governorship of Guyenne. In 1556, upon hearing that Jacques, Duke of Nemours had made his cousin-by-marriage pregnant, he threatened bloody consequences for Savoie and his family, causing the man to take the excuse of a campaign into Italy to leave France. In February 1557, Navarre, Jeanne and their son Henry travelled to the French court in Paris; while there Henri suggested a betrothal between his daughter Margaret and Henry. Desiring to reverse the Spanish occupation of much of his kingdom, he entered into negotiations with Charles V; however these went nowhere and compromised his position at court still further. Navarre demonstrated early sympathy towards the reformation, corresponding with the Genevan pastor Boisnormand as early as 1557, and providing protection to the Huguenot church of Guyenne in 1558 through his capacity as governor. In 1558 he attended the psalm singing at the Pré-aux-Clercs to the considerable fury of Henri. He fought for the crown in the last stage of the Italian wars in 1558. The Huguenot leadership were animated by the prospect of bringing Navarre into their camp causing Calvin and Beza to devote considerable efforts to the project.

=== Francis II ===
When in 1559 king Henri died, opponents of the Guise, including Anne de Montmorency flocked to meet Navarre in Vendôme hoping he would establish himself in the government. The Guise were however able to neutralise him by buying him off with the governorship of Poitou and sent him off to escort Elisabeth of Valois to the Spanish border. In 1560, the organisers of the Amboise conspiracy tried to recruit him as a figurehead for their efforts against the Guise government, but Navarre was apathetic. After the failure of Amboise, unrest continued in the south of France; Navarre's brother Condé intrigued concerning an uprising in Lyon, with plans to send 1200 men in support. His letter on the matter was intercepted by the Guise, however, and both brothers were summoned to court in August for an Assembly of Notables. Condé and Navarre were the only grandees not to attend, and thus played no part in that assembly's calling of an estates general. To further isolate Navarre, Condé and the house of Bourbon-Vendôme, the Guise created two super governorships, giving them to their cousins Charles, Prince of La Roche-sur-Yon and Louis, Duke of Montpensier, separating the princes of blood from each other. On 31 August the Guise wrote Navarre they had 40,000 troops ready to move into the south, and to present themselves at court. Navarre and Condé, possessing only around 6000 troops, were unable to resist, and came north without a fight. Upon their arrival Condė was detained and sentenced.

== Reign of Charles IX ==
=== Death of Francis ===
In December 1560 the young Francis II died and was succeeded by his brother Charles IX. Charles, being too young to rule, required a regent, a position Navarre was entitled to as first prince of the blood. Catherine however possessed considerable leverage over him due to the imprisonment of his brother Condé for treason. The two agreed that in exchange for Catherine being regent, Navarre would become Lieutenant General of the kingdom and Condé would be brought back into favour.

=== Collapse of the regency ===
Navarre found himself increasingly in opposition to the religious policy of Catherine's administration, finally breaking with her concerning the Edict of Saint-Germain, writing urgently to Guise to return to court so they could present a united front against the edict. On his way to Paris, Guise's men committed the Massacre of Vassy, plunging France into civil war. Navarre in his role as Lieutenant General would be the supreme commander of the crown's forces in the coming conflict.

=== First French War of Religion and death ===
In May he issued a decree expelling all Protestants from Paris, much to the delight of radicals in the capital. His army and that of Condé faced off against each other in June near Orléans. The sides only came to light skirmishing however, as negotiations between the sides to avoid bloodshed continued. With Condé now retreating, Navarre and the other leaders began retaking rebel towns, capturing Blois, Tours and Amboise. In August the main royal force under Navarre besieged and overcame the rebel garrison in the key town of Bourges. When his wife, Jeanne d'Albret, allowed the Huguenots to sack the chapel and the churches of Vendôme, he threatened to send her to a convent. Having taken Bourges, the royal army was faced with a choice, to march on the Huguenot capital of Orléans immediately, or first strike at the northern town of Rouen, which Aumale was currently unsuccessfully trying to besiege with his small force. Navarre wanted to immediately push on Orlėans, but the plague in the town, the threat of the English, and the hopes of Catherine that he might yet prevail on his brother to abandon rebellion, persuaded the court against this policy. Navarre's army invested the city of Rouen on 28 September and began trying to subdue the town. On 13 October, while inspecting the siege trenches, Navarre was mortally wounded by a musket shot to the shoulder. Despite the efforts of the famed surgeon Ambroise Paré, he could not be saved, and died of his wounds on 17 November. It was rumoured that his last rites were taken in the Lutheran custom, compounding long-held suspicions of his religious unorthodoxy.

== Marriage and children ==
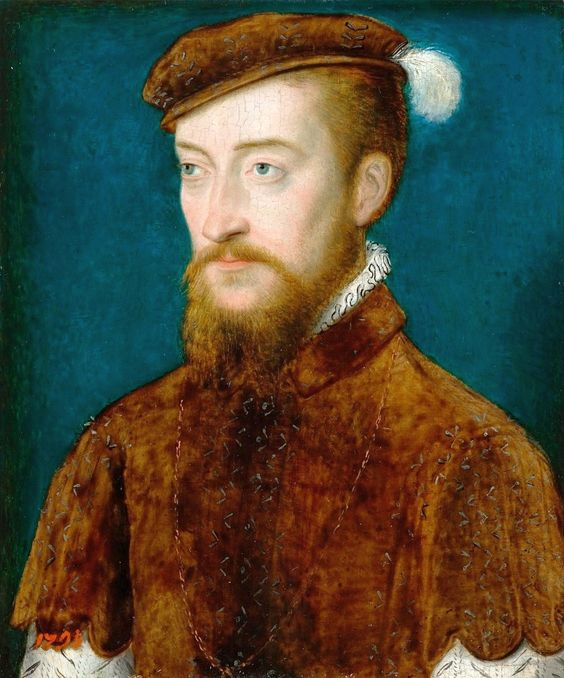
A detailed portrait of the King of Navarre by Corneille de Lyon (1548). Royal Castle, Warsaw

On 20 October 1548, at Moulins, Antoine married Jeanne d'Albret, the daughter of Henry II of Navarre and his wife Marguerite de Navarre. After his father-in-law's death in May 1555, he became King of Navarre, Count of Foix, of Bigorre, of Armagnac, of Périgord, and Viscount of Béarn. It was reported that Jeanne was much in love with him. His reconversion to Catholicism separated him from his wife and he threatened to repudiate her.

Antoine and Jeanne had:

- Henry (1551–1553), Duke of Beaumont
- Henry IV of France (1553–1610)
- Louis (1555–1557), Count of Marle
- Madeleine (1556–1556)
- Catherine (1559–1604), married Henry II, Duke of Lorraine in 1599

With his mistress, Louise de La Béraudière de l'Isle Rouhet, Antoine had:

- Charles, Archbishop of Rouen from 1554 until 1610.

== Sources ==
- Bergin, Joseph (1996). The Making of the French Episcopate, 1589–1661. St. Edmundsbury Press Ltd.
- Bryson, David (1999). Queen Jeanne and the Promised Land. Koninklijke Brill.
- Carroll, Stuart (2009). Martyrs & Murderers: The Guise Family and the Making of Europe. Oxford University Press.
- Commire, Anne (2000). Women in World History. Vol. 10. Yorkin Publications.
- Harding, Robert (1978). Anatomy of a Power Elite: The Provincial Governors of Early Modern France. Yale University Press.
- Holt, Mack P. (2005). The French wars of religion, 1562–1629. Cambridge University Press.
- Knecht, Robert (1998). Catherine de' Medici. Longman.
- Louisa, Angelo (1992). "Antoine de Bourbon". In Dupuy, Trevor; Johnson, Curt; Bongard, David L. (eds.). The Harper Encyclopedia of Military Biography. Castle Books.
- Pitts, Vincent J. (2009). Henri IV of France: His Reign and Age. The Johns Hopkins University Press.
- Robin, Diana Maury; Larsen, Anne R.; Levin, Carole (2007). Encyclopedia of women in the Renaissance: Italy, France, and England. ABC-CLIO, Inc.
- Roelker, Nancy Lyman (1968). Queen of Navarre, Jeanne d'Albret, 1528–1572. Harvard University Press.
- Sutherland, Nicola (1962). "Calvinism and the Conspiracy of Amboise". History. 47 160.
- Sutherland, Nicola (1973). Bosher (ed.). French Government and Society, 1500–1850 Essays in Memory of Alfred Cobban. Athlone Press.
- Thompson, James (1909). The Wars of Religion in France, 1559–1576: The Huguenots, Catherine de Medici and Philip II. Chicago University Press.
- Vincent, Marylène (2015). Henri IV et les femmes. De l'amour à la mort (in French). Sud Ouest.

Antoine of Navarre House of Bourbon Cadet branch of the Capetian dynasty Born: 22 April 1518 Died: 17 November 1562
Navarrese royalty
Preceded by Henry II	King of Navarre; 25 May 1555 – 17 November 1562 with Jeanne III	Succeeded by Jeanne III
French nobility
Preceded by Charles of Bourbon	Duke of Vendôme; 25 March 1537 – 17 November 1562	Succeeded by Henry of Bourbon
