= Leonora Dori =

Italian-French courtier (1568–1617)

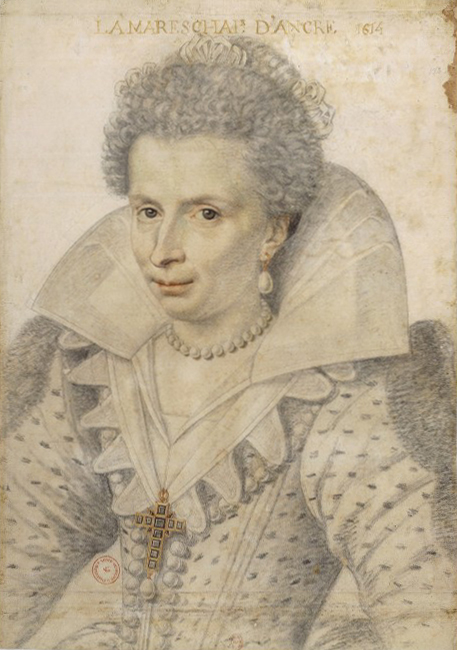
Leonora Dori Galigaï

Leonora Dori Galigaï (19 May 1568 – 8 July 1617) was a French courtier of Italian origin, an influential favourite of the French regent Marie de' Medici, mother of King Louis XIII. Galigaï was married to Concino Concini, the later marquis and then marshal d'Ancre, during Marie's reign as queen mother and regent of France.

== Early life and France ==
Galigaï, the daughter of a carpenter named Dori, grew up in Florence in the Palazzo Pitti as a young attendant of Marie de' Medici, who managed to buy her adoption from the Galigai, a poor but noble Florentine family.

In 1600, she followed her mistress to France who married King Henry IV of France, who named Galigaï Dame d'atour (lady-in-waiting) to the Queen Marie, immediately after her marriage to the Florentine nobleman Concini.

Galigaï suffered from debilitating depressions and paralyzing spasms, which may have been symptoms of epilepsy, which the queen and her courtiers believed to be due to demonic possession, but which were resistant to exorcism. She was treated by the Portuguese-born, Italian-Jewish court physician of Marie and Louis XIII: Filotheo Eliau Montalto (died 1616).

In an age when people believed in witchcraft and sorcery, Galigaï was hired by the queen to perform exorcisms and white magic to counter black magic and curses. She earned huge sums of money by these tasks, as well as from bribes for giving people access to the queen. Galigaï amassed an enormous fortune, which she invested in banks and in real estate in France and Italy.

In 1610 King Henri IV, the husband of Marie de' Medici, was assassinated, and his widow became the Queen Mother of Louis XIII and the Regent of France. After Concini was murdered by his political enemies in 1617, his wife Galigaï was arrested, imprisoned in Blois and charged with lèse majesté through practicing black magic, witchcraft and "Judaizing". Galigaï was judged guilty of having bewitched the regent. She was beheaded and her body subsequently burned at the stake at the Place de Grève in Paris. Concurrent with these times, in 1616 and 1617, various songs and tracts were published in Paris, Rouen, and London (English translations), concerning the couple, their activities and fate.

== Legacy ==
Galigaï's life is the subject of Alfred de Vigny's 1831 tragedy La Maréchale d'Ancre and the 1839 Italian opera La Marescialla d'Ancre, with a libretto by Giovanni Prati, based on the de Vigny work, and music by Alessandro Nini.

== Bibliography ==
- D iscovrs svr la mort dee Eleonor Galligay Femme de Conchine Marquis d'Ancre : Executee en Greue le Samedy 8.de Iuillet. 1617
- Fernand Hayem, Le Maréchal d'Ancre et Léonora Galigaï, Plon, Paris, 1910
- François Poncetton, Galigaï [A biographical romance. On the life of Leonora Concini, Marchioness d'Ancre.] Paris, Gallimard, 1937
- Giachetti Cipriano, La tragica avventura dei Concini 1600–1617, Milan, Mondadori, 1939.
- Georges Mongrédien, Léonora Galigaï. Un procès de sorcellerie sous Louis XIII, Paris, Hachette, 1968.

Court offices
Preceded by Louise de la Béraudière	Dame d'atour to the Queen of France; 1600–1610	Succeeded by Antoinette d'Albert de Luynes
