= Leonore Krenzlin =

- Born: 1934 (age 91–92); Leipzig, Germany
- Occupation: Academic
- Years active: 1959–present
- Spouse: Dieter Schiller (in 1979)
- Parent: Herbert Zschelletzschky (1902-1986)

Leonore Krenzlin (born 1934, in Leipzig, Germany) studied at the Humboldt University of Berlin beginning in 1953. From 1970 to 1990 she was a research assistant at the Central Institute of Literary History of the Academy of Sciences of the German Democratic Republic. In 1978, she completed her Doctorate of Philosophy in German Studies with a dissertation on Hermann Kant and has become an expert on German literary figures. Her work on Kant was first published in 1980 and has since been republished three times. Among other literary figures, Krenzlin has written about Friedrich Griese, Willy Sachse and Ernst Wiechert, as well as the migration issues which occurred in 1945.

Since 1979, she has been married to the fellow German scholar, Dieter Schiller.

== Selected works ==
- Krenzlin, Leonore (1980). Hermann Kant, Leben und Werk (in German). Berlin: Volk und Wissen.
- Krenzlin, Leonore (1997). Grosse Kontroverse oder kleiner Dialog?: Gesprächsbemühungen und Kontaktbruchstellen zwischen "inneren" und "äusseren" literarischen Emigranten (in German). Niederkorn: s.n.
- Krenzlin, Leonore (April 1999). "Roter Matrose und Widerstandskämpfer, der unbekannte Schriftsteller Willy Sachse" (PDF). Utopie kreativ (in German). H (102). Berlin: Rosa Luxembourg Foundation: 47–56.
- Krenzlin, Leonore (2004). Gerhard Scholz und sein Kreis: zum 100. Geburtstag des Mitbegründers der Literaturwissenschaft in der DDR (in German). Berlin, Germany: Helle Panke.
- Krenzlin, Leonore (2005). Geschichte des Scheiterns–Geschichte des Lernens?: Überlegungen zur Lage während und nach der 'Großen Kontroverse' und zur Motivation ihrer Akteure (in German). Göttingen, Germany: Wallstein.
- Krenzlin, Leonore; Weigelt, Klaus (2010). Ernst Wiechert im Gespräch: Begegnungen und Einblicke in sein Werk (in German). Berlin: Walter de Gruyter. ISBN 978-3-11-023775-7.
- Krenzlin, Leonore (2010). Thomas Mann und Ernst Wiechert (in German). Berlin, Germany: Walter de Gruyter.
- Krenzlin, Leonore (2015). "Franz Villons kleiner Bruder: der junge Biermann in der DDR (1953 - 1965)". Autorinnen und Autoren: Roland Berbig (in German). Reizland DDR: 149–177.
