= Leonora Jessie Little =

Australian zoologist

Leonora Jessie Little (1865 – 27 May 1945), later Leonora Jessie Wilsmore, was an Australian scientist and philanthropist. She was the first woman to graduate with a science degree from the University of Melbourne.

== Life ==
Little was born in Melbourne in 1865. She was the second daughter of Leonora Smyth and Dugald Little, a merchant from Scotland.

Little graduated from the University of Melbourne with a BSc in 1893 and completed an MSc two years later.

On 28 June 1894 at St. John's Church of England, Camberwell, she married Norman Thomas Mortimer Wilsmore, a fellow science graduate, who was later Professor of Chemistry at the University of Western Australia. The couple wore academic dress and were unattended. The occasion was a double wedding, as Little's sister, Grace Lillias Little married Herbert Foley Rodda.

A paper she wrote, entitled "Barriers to migration, and their effects as shown in the Australian region", was published in The Victorian Naturalist in 1894 by the Victorian Naturalists' Club to which she had been elected member in 1893.

When her only child, a son born in Scotland, had begun school, Little enrolled at University College London where she studied zoology and described seven new species sea anemones, including Epiphellia browni, Epiphellia capitata and Peachia hilli.

== Death and legacy ==
Little died in Perth, Western Australia on 27 May 1945. In her will, Little left an income from assets to her two unmarried sisters in Melbourne. Upon their deaths, any residue was to be given to the University of Melbourne for them to set up the Norman Thomas Mortimer Wilsmore Research Fund, in memory of her husband, who had predeceased her in 1940.
