= Leonora O'Brien =

Irish pharmacist and entrepreneur

- Born: Castlerea, County Roscommon, Ireland
- Occupation(s): Pharmacist, entrepreneur
- Awards: Cartier Women's Initiative Awards

Leonora O'Brien is an Irish pharmacist and entrepreneur. Having worked in pharmacy regulation, she was the founder and chief executive officer of Pharmapod, a cloud-platform for pharmacists and physicians to monitor safety of dispensing processes and drive the safe dispensing of medicines. O'Brien has won a number of awards for her business endeavours and is a leading voice in the field of women in business.

== Early life and career ==
O'Brien was born in Castlerea, County Roscommon. O'Brien qualified as a pharmacist. She worked in pharmacy regulation and policy development in both Ireland and the European Union. She moved out of pharmacy regulation into the private sector in 2012, having noticed a gap in the market for inter-pharmacy interaction.

== Pharmapod ==
O'Brien developed the business case for Pharmapod in the 12-week-long LaunchPad entrepreneur hub at the National Digital Research Centre (NDRC) in Dublin in early 2012. O'Brien founded Pharmapod in November 2012, as an online tool which assists pharmaceutical dispensaries (including doctors) to keep track of and report anomalies, which can cause fatalities. By 2014, Pharmapod was operating in Ireland, the United Kingdom (in a deal with the NHS) and Kenya (a focus was put on the developing world, where the product was considered very useful, especially with a view to capturing trends in counterfeit medicines), with an employee base of 10 people. Seeking up to €5 million in December 2014, by the end of 2017, Pharmapod had raised over €1.8 million in capital, with both institutional and angel investors.

== Awards and prizes ==
- €5,000 prize fund at the Tech Entrepreneurs workshop in Dublin as part of the European Digital Agenda Assembly, June 2013
- European Laureate Cartier Women's Initiative Awards 2013 (€20,000). (First Irish women to have been nominated in the category)
- Image magazine Entrepreneur of the Year
