= Leonora A. Hohl =

American microbiologist

- Born: 9 March 1909
- Died: 30 June 1997 (aged 88)
- Citizenship: United States
- Education: University of California, University of Michigan
- Known for: Studies on the freezing and preservation of produce, physiology of yeast
- Scientific career
- Fields: Microbiology, Mycology, Botany
- Workplaces: University of California, Berkeley, Peerless Yeast Co., Acme Brewery
- Thesis: (1939)

Leonora A. Hohl (9 March 1909 – 30 June 1997) was a microbiologist from the College of Agriculture at the University of California, Berkeley. She was educated at the University of California and University of Michigan. She returned to UC Berkeley for the vast majority of her professional life. She specialized in the study of sugar content and acid production of Saccharomyces cerevisiae.

== Education ==
Hohl began her education at the University of California, receiving her B.A. in 1931. She then matriculated to University of Michigan where she obtained her M.A. in 1934. She returned to University of California to complete her doctoral education (1939).

== Scientific career ==
Hohl's early work focused on the characterization of acids produced by S. cerevisiae during fermentation of sugar. Later in her career, she worked on freezing preservation of fruits and vegetables with Maynard A. Joslyn.

In 1992, Hohl was named a fellow of the California Native Plants Society, the highest honor awarded by the society to its members.

== Selected publications ==
- Hohl, Leonora A. (1942). "A Study of Organisms Found in Lactic Acid Fermentation of Lettuce". Journal of Food Science. 7 (4): 309–312. doi:10.1111/j.1365-2621.1942.tb17655.x.
- M. A. Joslyn and Leonora A. Hohl. (1948). The commercial freezing of fruit products. California Agricultural Experiment Station Bulletin 703.
- Hohl, Leonora A. “Application of peptic enzymes to maceration of plant tissues for microscopic study.” Stain technology 23 3 (1948): 129-31.
