= Edict of 19 April =

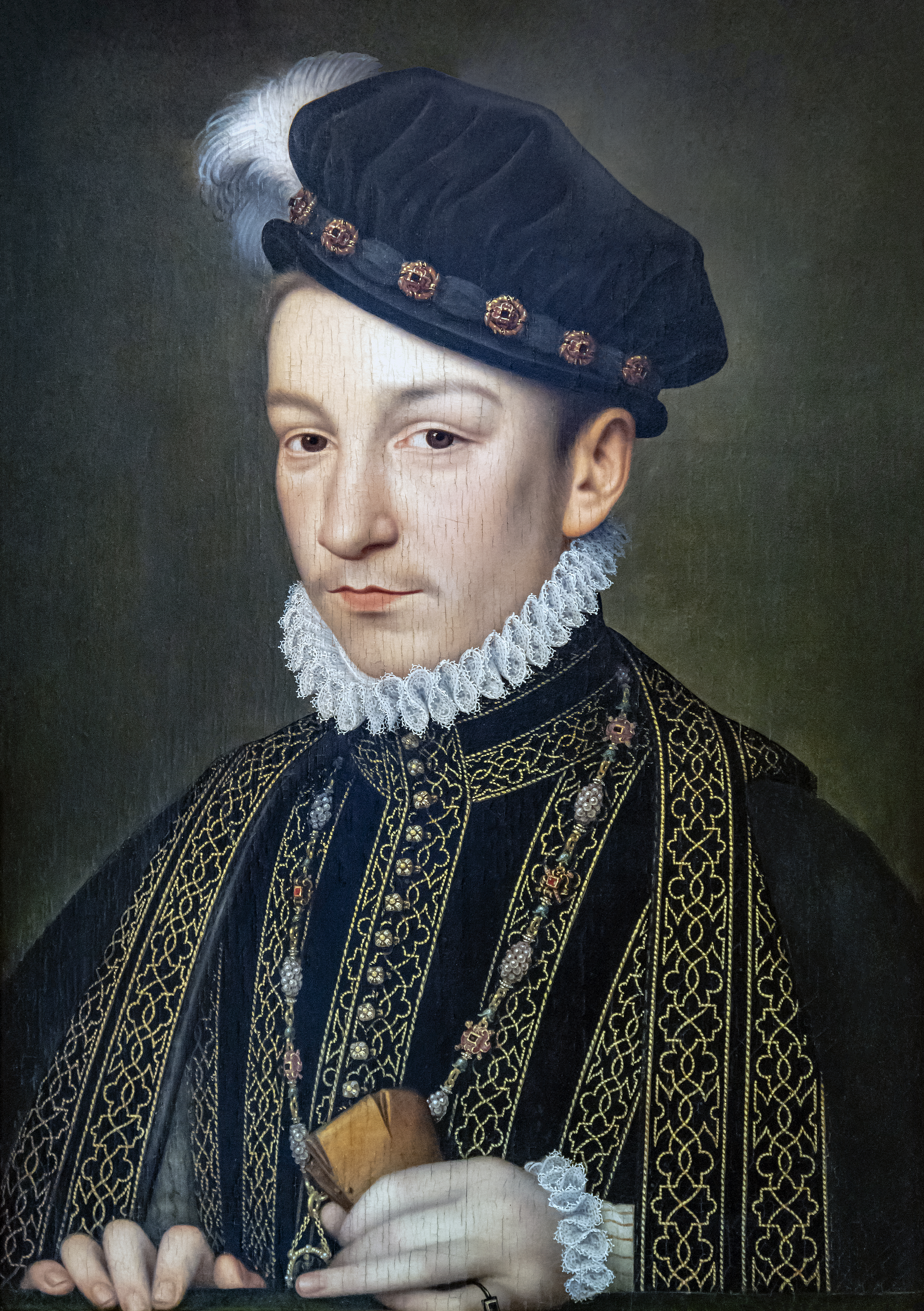
Portrait of Charles IX of France, under whom the edict was issued, by François Clouet

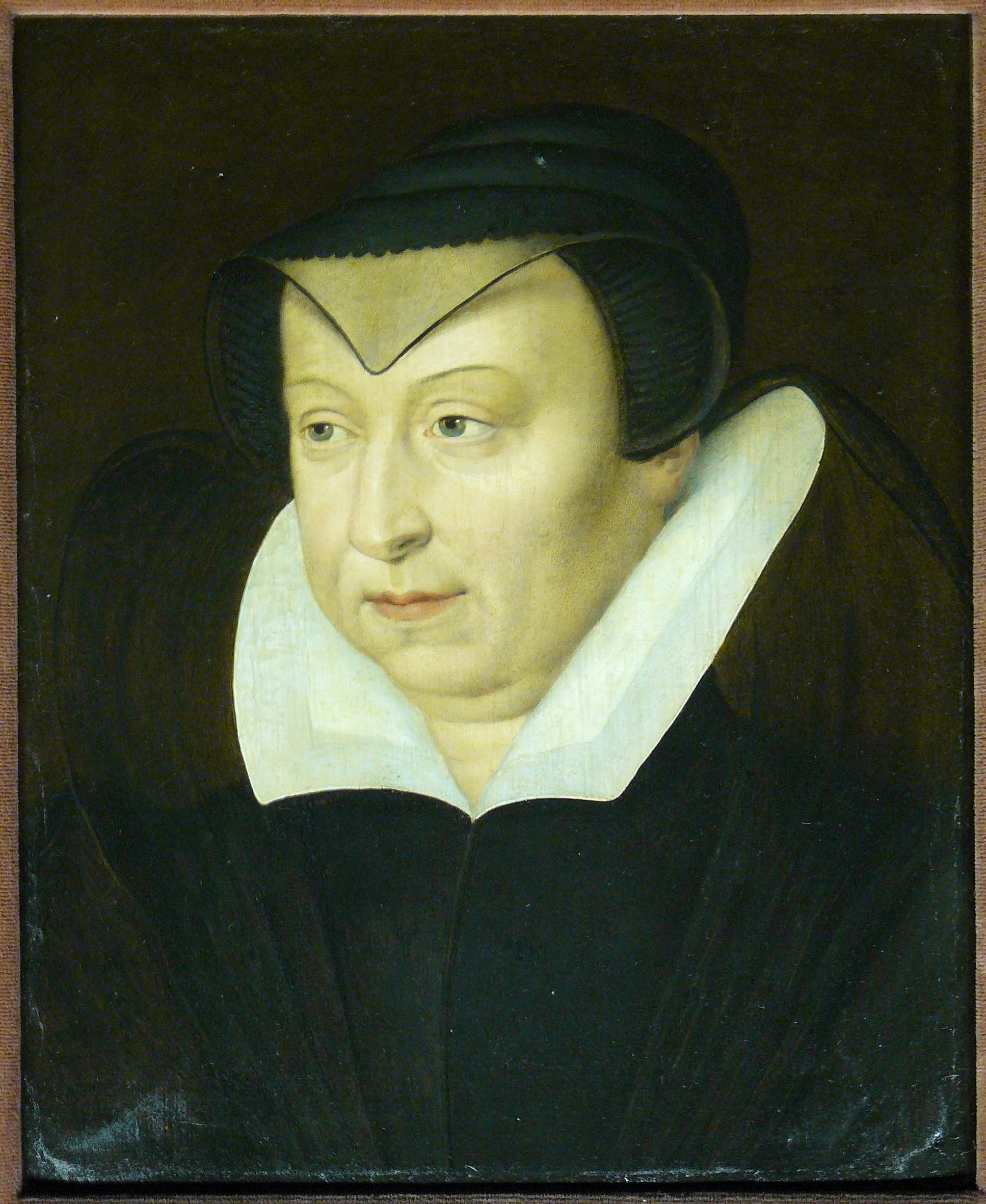
Portrait of Catherine de' Medici

The Edict of 19 April was a religious edict promulgated by the regency council of Charles IX of France on 19 April 1561. The edict would confirm the decision of the Estates General of 1560-1 as regarded the amnesty for religious prisoners. The edict would however go further in an effort to calm the unrest that was sweeping France, outlawing the use of religious epithets and providing a pathway for religious exiles to return to the country. Despite not being an edict of toleration for Protestantism, the more conservative Catholics would interpret the edict as a concession to the Huguenots, leading to the Parlement of Paris to remonstrate the crown. The edict would be endorsed and furthered in the more sweeping Edict of July a few months later, before it in turn was superseded by the first edict of toleration, the Edict of Saint-Germain.

== Background ==
=== Prior edicts ===
The growth of Protestantism in France, under Henry II of France was of great concern to the king. He passed several edicts, hoping to stamp the religion out, with first the Edict of Châteaubriant in 1551, then the Edict of Compiègne in 1557, and finally the Edict of Ecouen in 1559. He was not however able to devote his full attentions to the stamping out of the new sect in France, distracted as he was by the Italian Wars. With their conclusion at the Peace of Cateau Cambresis King Henry hoped to change his attentions to matters at home, but an accident during a joust took his life. With the kings sudden death, the young François II took the throne, his policy directed by his maternal uncles, François, Duke of Guise and Charles, Cardinal of Lorraine. They initially sought continuity with the prior regime, passing four more edicts between the death of Henri and February 1560, in which they decreed any house found to have held Protestant worship, would be razed, landlords who harboured Protestant tenants, would be prosecuted.

The crisis that ensued from the Amboise conspiracy offered an opportunity for them to change tactics in the face of concerted opposition. The first Edict of Amboise (1560) published a week before the attempt on the castle separated the concept of heresy from that of sedition as two separate crimes, with those convicted of the former prior to the edicts publication, to be freed on amnesty. The Edict of Romorantin continued in this more liberal framework, transferring the trial of heresy cases to the purview of the ecclesiastical courts, which lacked the ability to sentence defendants to death. While this did not abolish the death penalty for heresy as they could still refer cases to the Parlements for sentencing, it acted as a de facto abolition of the death penalty for heresy.

=== Estates general and the death of François II ===
The Italian wars had pushed France into serious debt, which combined with the religious crisis and young king, left the government of France on very shaky footing. As a result in August the Guise oversaw the convocation of the Estates General, to meet in December, to help solve France's various issues. Before they could meet however, the young François acquired an ear infection while out hunting, his condition worsened, and he died on 5 December. This created a new crisis as while he had been young, he had been technically old enough to rule, whereas now, his brother Charles would require a regency council. Catherine de' Medici using the leverage of the imprisoned Louis, Prince of Condé, negotiated Antoine de Bourbon out of his rights as first prince of the blood to the regency, securing it for herself.

While the estates were unable to come to any broad solution to France's religious crisis, it was agreed, that an amnesty, upon the lines of that of Amboise be issued for all religious prisoners, of which there had been a considerable increase during the tumult that followed the conspiracy of Amboise across France.

== Crisis ==
=== Courtly crisis ===
Protestant growth in France, continued apace in early 1561, and with it a violent Catholic backlash. The Catholic fear was only furthered by what they saw at court, with the return of Condé to council in early 1561, and the more open Protestantism of Gaspard II de Coligny and Odet de Coligny. This turbulence peaked in the month of April, during Easter, with the crown selecting Jean de Monluc as the courts Lenten preacher, a bishop known to be highly sympathetic to Protestantism. This, combined with libellous rumours about the young king singing psalms (an activity Catholics would not engage in at this time) convinced many conservative Catholics in the court that the monarchy was becoming Protestant.

The religiously conservative Anne de Montmorency and the duke of Guise, outraged at Monluc's sermon, travelled together into the servants quarters on Easter Sunday, to hear a more reliably Catholic sermon. They would follow this up with an exchanging of the kiss of peace under the auspices of François de Tournon, temporarily putting their long running feud on hold to work together against the crown becoming Protestant. Shortly thereafter, both families and their retinues departed court, leaving Catherine politically isolated with Condé and Coligny.

=== Popular crisis ===
The situation in Paris in particular was fast deteriorating in April 1561. Protestants, growing in confidence from their influence at court, began more openly meeting to worship in the city, gathering in the Pre-aux-Clercs to hear Easter sermons. Noble Protestants also met in the house of the Duke of Longjumeau, among them Léonor d'Orléans, duc de Longueville, to hear sermons, to the knowledge and apathy of the court. This infuriated many Catholic students, who marched on the residence. Longjumeau, aware of this, stocked arms in his house, and when the angry crowd approached, he and the others inside, fought their way out of the building, leaving several dead and dozens wounded. Longueville, angry at this popular intrusion on his residence, appealed to the Parlement to punish the students responsible. The Parlement prohibited the students from further attempts on his property, but also declared to Longueville, that his property would be forfeit if he did not leave Paris, and exile himself to his chateau, which he promptly did.

The Parlement, distraught at the crisis in the city, deputised President Christophe de Thou and Procureur Général Bourdin to travel to Catherine to implore her and the chancellor, Michel de l'Hôpital to find a solution to this wave of unrest, and restore order to the kingdom. On 18 April l'Hôpital presented the edict they had drawn up in response to quiet the unrest.

== Terms of the edict ==
The first clause of the edict concerned itself with the prohibition of religious epithets, singling out 'Huguenot' and 'Papist' respectively as two terms that would be prohibited from being uttered against others. The edict then moved on to the topic of private houses. Here it broke with past edicts and stated that the only acceptable time for entry into a private citizen's house where heretical preaching is suspected is with a warrant, and conducted by officials. The edict then offered a re-affirmation of the agreed upon decision of the estates in January, outlining again that all those imprisoned for heresy were to be released without a requirement for a formal recantation. Those who had been exiled from France for their heresy would be permitted to return, and reclaim their property if they agreed to live as 'good Catholics.' Further those abroad who decided they did not wish to abjure Protestantism, the requirement for returning, would be granted permission to sell their assets.

== Legacy ==
=== Reactions ===
==== Catholics ====
The publication of the edict only furthered the anger of the more militant parts of the Catholic population. The ambassador to Spain, de Chantonnay, angrily demanded an audience with Catherine which he received, lambasting her for bringing the Catholics of the country to the brink of despair. She retorted that, the king, the council and herself remained resolutely committed to living and dying as Catholics, and that the edict was a necessary measure to quiet the troubles which were consuming France. It did not escape the attention of many conservative Catholics that the edict which prohibited the invasion of homes to search for (still) illegal Protestant services coincided with the attack on the residence of Longueville.

The enforcement of the edict depended much upon the will of the governor and magistrates in the province. Anne de Joyeuse the governor of Languedoc complained to Catherine that his magistrates were confused by the diversity of the edicts they had received over the last few years, suggesting Parlement should be allowed to remedy this muddled situation so that Protestants in the legal profession could not use the confusion to their advantage. Catherine responded that it was necessary to deal with the legislative ambiguities in a moderate fashion until such time a council could be called.

==== Parlement of Paris ====
The edict was disseminated directly to the provincial baillage and senechaussee courts, alongside the governors of the realm, so that they could quickly enforce its terms. This infuriated the Parlement of Paris, which took it as its prerogative that all prospective legislation was to be properly examined by their court, prior to it being published, let alone distributed to lower courts. The Parlement set about drawing up a remonstrance to the crown in May, under the direction of Baillet, Chambon and Faye of the moderate conservative faction that comprised the majority of the court.

Their remonstrance began with a lengthy denunciation of the way the edict had been published, decrying it as unconstitutional and of dubious legality if any case created by it was appealed to their court. After six paragraphs of this the remonstrance moved on to the substance of the edict. The first issue it took was with the prohibition of insults from either Protestants or Catholics on the matter of religion. While this didn't directly approve of the diversity of religion the Parlement read this to mean that it was acceptable Protestants openly exist in the country, and thus that two religions were now tolerated. The Parlement noted that no prior king of France had ever been found to be a heretic, and that France had a 'proud' tradition of dealing with heresy going back to the Albigensian Crusade. The remonstrance noted that while it agreed it was certainly laudable to try and combat sedition, that this edict would do quite the opposite, by communicating to Protestants that their heresy was acceptable, it would cause them to multiply, thus compounding the sedition in the country. They counter proposed that to solve sedition the king should make it clear he would die in the faith of his forebears, and compel all his subjects to swear to uphold the Catholic faith. The Parlement then turned its attentions to the specific terms, decrying how 'Papist' was being treated as a slur, despite obedience to the Pope on religious matters being a commendable thing, not deserving of placement alongside this newly invented word 'Huguenot.'

The prohibition on entry into residences without a warrant to investigate religion was critiqued as 'contradicting prior edicts' which called for suspected heretical services to be banned. The notion of allowing ex-heretics to return to live in France was derided as likely to cause great scandal and difficulty. Further the term 'good Catholics' was unacceptable to the Parlement, because the heretics think of themselves as Catholic already, thus they felt it should be made clear that they are to live in obedience to the Roman church as had the kings forebears. The provision on allowing practicing heretics to sell their assets and keep the money was also attacked. The Parlement argued this contravened the law on prohibiting the taking of money out of France to aid the kings enemies. On the matter of amnesty for religious prisoners, the court asked the king to enforce prior edicts, which called for ex-religious prisoners to be expelled from the kingdom on release. Finally the Parlement ended with an attack on the present state of the church, calling for the king to oversee a reform in the morals of the clergy and a return to ecclesiastical elections for church office.

Catherine retorted to the Parlement that Lorraine had approved of the terms agreed at the estates general in January, and further noted that this edict was only a provisional measure, to calm France, until such time a church council could solve the religious question. While the Parlement considered trying to remove l'Hôpital from office, they moved on their focus to attacking the ordinance of Orléans.

==== Protestants ====
The edict proved a boon to Protestants, as their numbers continued to grow through early 1561. John Calvin remarked in a letter that he was astonished at the amount of preachers that France was now requesting be sent from Geneva to manage communities in the country. The aristocratic Protestants too were emboldened, and on 11 June presented a petition to the crown asking for temples to worship in, so that they might dispel the libellous rumours as to what Protestants get up to in their nightly services.

=== Subsequent edicts ===
Having received this petition, and still being pressured by conservative Catholics in court and Parlement to retreat from the edict of 19 April, Catherine decided to host a pourparlers in the hopes such a discussion could provide a more definitive and satisfactory edict on the religious question. Hosted by Hòpital they would host 3 sessions of grandees to discuss the matter. After some heated discussion it was agreed that Protestantism would remain banned, but that Protestants would be allowed to sell their possessions before leaving the kingdom, with no return to the era of burnings that had occurred in the 1550s. The edict closed the loophole in Romorantin that allowed for the death penalty, fully removing it as a penalty, alongside corporal punishment. This edict in turn would be superseded by the far more ambitious and radical Edict of Saint-Germain in January 1562, which for the first time provided textual tolerance to Protestant worship in outlined areas of France, as opposed to what had been seen as implicit non textual tolerance through the prohibition of investigating houses. The controversy over this edict would lead to first the Massacre of Vassy and then the French Wars of Religion in April 1562.
