= Edict of Amboise (1560) =

French decree on religion

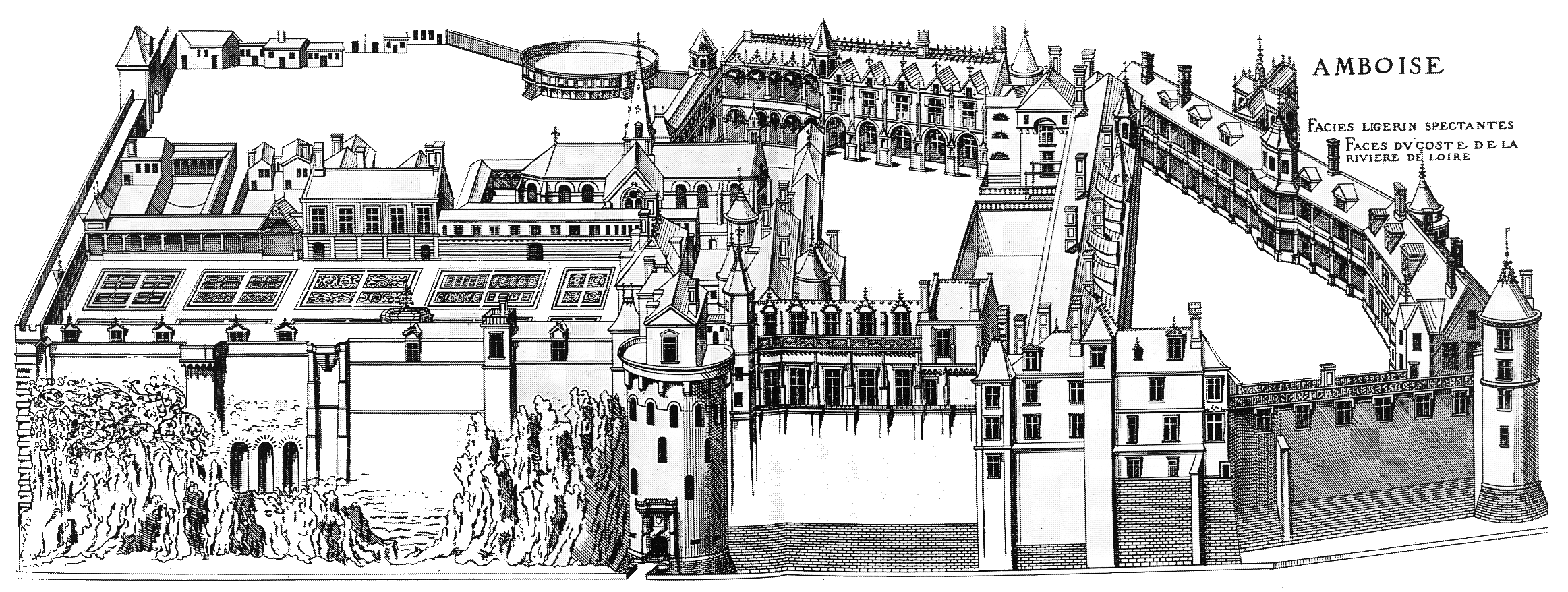
The Chateau d'Amboise, where the edict was formulated shortly before the conspiracy of Amboise

The Edict of Amboise (1560) was a decree that created the framework to separate heresy from sedition, promulgated by the young king Francis II on the advice of his council and mother Catherine de' Medici. The edict was the first promulgated in France that lessened the persecution of Huguenots through the provision of amnesty for past religious crimes on the condition the offender returned to the Catholic fold. The edict was published during the Amboise conspiracy whilst the royal court was resident in the Château d'Amboise and their authority over France was shaken. It would be superseded first by the Edict of Romorantin in May of the same year, then the Edict of July and finally the Edict of Saint-Germain.

== Background ==
=== Religious policy of Henri II and Francis II ===
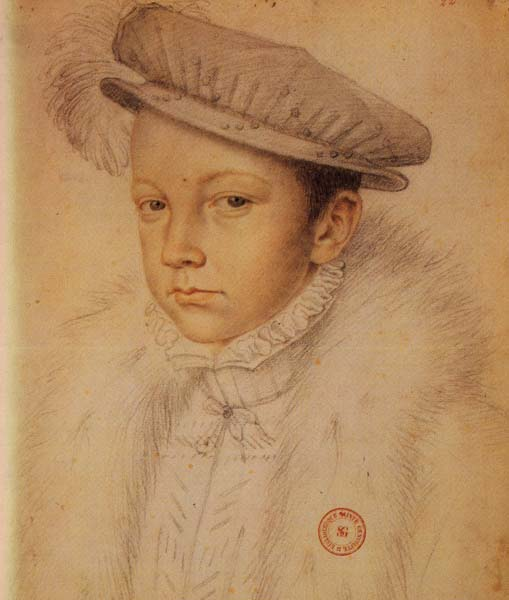
Portrait of Francis II

Under Henri II France's Huguenots had faced considerable persecution. Henri had sought to eradicate the nascent movement, with several edicts, notably the edicts of Chateaubriant (1551), Compiegne (1557) and Ecouen (1559). The substance of these edicts was the criminalisation of heresy, with the Chambre Ardente set up to burn heretics and special prosecutors sent out into the provinces to oversee this process. His reign would however be cut short by a jousting accident, just as he had concluded the Habsburg–Valois Wars with the desire to turn his intention in a more focused manner to the 'problem of heresy.' He would be succeeded by his young son Francis II, who was sickly, and his policy was largely set by his two uncles François, Duke of Guise and Charles, Cardinal of Lorraine.

They initially sought continuity with the previous regime, and from July 1559 to February 1560 would pass four more persecutory edicts, including such provisions as the razing of any house which a Protestant meeting occurred in, and the prosecution of landlords who knowingly had heretics as tenants. The final persecutory edict prior to Amboise was that of February 1560, in which the edict noted that while prior edicts had successfully stamped out religious gatherings in the cities, 'seditious' Protestant worship had continued on the estates of the rural nobility, who protected the gatherings under their own legal authority for their land. Henceforth prosecutions of such cases were to be handled by the Parlement as opposed to the seigneur.

=== Unrest and discontent ===
With the death of Henri II and the ascension of such a young king, factions began to arise in opposition to the new regime. These coalesced around two main axes, the first religious opposition to the persecution, led by the Protestant clergy. This had already reached a flashpoint in 1559 with riots after the trial and execution of Anne du Bourg in Paris, with the Guise doing door to door searches of the city after the revenge killing of President Minard. The Guise further alienated elites with their financial and political policies, with their apogee the house of Bourbon and house of Montmorency were eclipsed in opportunity, souring their relations to the court, particularly those of Louis I, Prince of Condé. Payments to the army were deferred, angering the soldiers, and crown lands not in the possession of the Guise or their clients were resumed, frustrating the former nobles who had held such properties. They further created new taxes, and suppressed venal office.

== Edict of Amboise ==
=== Conspiracy of Amboise ===
A full-fledged conspiracy first consolidated in August 1559, aiming to push the dubious rights of Condé to the regency, over that of the Guise, despite Francis being of age to rule. The conspiracy was led in his stead by the seigneur de la Renaudie. He coalesced around him a mix of discontented rural nobility and Protestant clerics such as La Roche Chandieu. The conspirators met for the final time on 1 February 1560 to swear an oath and plan the specifics of the operation. By this time rumours of a conspiracy had long reached the Guise administration, and they received final confirmation, when, on the road from Longueville's estates to Amboise, the duke's lawyer road up to him with the secretary des Avenelles, who had got cold feet. He outlined the nature of the conspiracy to the Guise with considerable detail. The Guise hurried on to Amboise, and decided to invite much of the suspect nobility to the castle, to bear witness to the defeat of the coup. The fighting began on 11 March, and over the next ten days more bands of soldiers would be identified and mopped up.

=== Meeting of the council ===
With Coligny invited to Amboise alongside much of the upper nobility, his counsel was also sought as concerned France's religious policy, which in this unfolding crisis, was felt to be unsustainable by the crown. It had long been clear to Lorraine, that the current approach to heresy had utterly failed, and that Protestants were only growing in number despite the brutality. Chancellor François de Olivier agreed with this assessment, blaming the current policy for all the unrest France was experiencing. Coligny offered a radical solution noting how many Protestants there now were in the kingdom. He proposed the end to persecution, and the toleration of Protestantism, until such time as a church council could address and resolve the religious question. While Catherine and Michel de l'Hôpital would adopt such a policy in 1562, for now the council decided against it, in favour of the proposal of Lorraine.

=== Terms of the edict ===
The edict they established was published on 8 March, several days before the fighting began at Amboise. It began by deploring the bloodshed persecution had wrought on men, women and children over the previous years, noting that Francis little desired to begin his reign with such brutality as it was against his nature and young age. The edict offered amnesty to all past offenders convicted of the crime of heresy on certain conditions. They would be released from prison if they agreed to live their lives as good Catholics from this point forward. The edict would not however grant such rights to arrested Protestant preachers, whose convictions would stand. Further those committing seditious acts under the appearance of religious disagreement would also not be exempt. The edict was also not forward applicable, applying only to past crimes of religion, those found to be heretics after the edicts publication would still be liable for arrest.

== Long term significance ==
=== Registration ===
Despite some expectations to the contrary, the cautious edict passed through the registration process required by the Parlements to become law relatively smoothly. This would not be the case when the Parlements were faced with legislation upon the lines of Coligny's proposal at Amboise.

=== Amboise amnesties ===
Several days after the publication of this amnesty, a more specific one would be outlined by the crown, offering a pardon for all those currently outside Amboise castle, who within 48 hours put down their weapons and returned home. The amnesty was only part of the distributed letter though, with a warning that any who was found to still be outside the castle after that period had elapsed, would be treated as a traitor, and executed. This amnesty would be amended on 22 March with an exclusion for the political leadership of the current coup, such as La Renaudie and the baron de Castlenau. The option to nominate a representative for a group who was returning home, to petition the crown peacefully on religious grounds was also granted, in recognition of the mix of motives among the coup plotters and the inclusion of what the crown termed 'simple people'.

=== Subsequent legislation ===
The edict of Romorantin later the same year would follow on from the framework established by the edict of Amboise, in it those heretics whose only crime was religion, would be tried by the episcopal courts, while clergy, pamphleteers and other seditious rebels would be tried by the Présidaux court. The former lacked the power to give the death penalty, practically speaking abolishing the death penalty for heresy in France on Amboise lines. In the edicts of April 19 and July civilian investigation of whether heretical worship was being conducted in a house was prohibited. The edict of July further closed a technical loophole that allowed the episcopal courts to refer cases to the Parlements, which still had the capacity to give the death penalty, completing the abolition of the punishment, alongside also prohibiting corporal punishment for heresy. Finally in January 1562 the crown promulgated the Edict of Saint-Germain this landmark edict fell upon the lines proposed at Amboise by Coligny, with complete toleration for Protestantism, within certain confines, and total liberty of conscience. The fallout from this edict would begin the French Wars of Religion.
