= Edict of Romorantin =

1560 French edict on punishing heretics

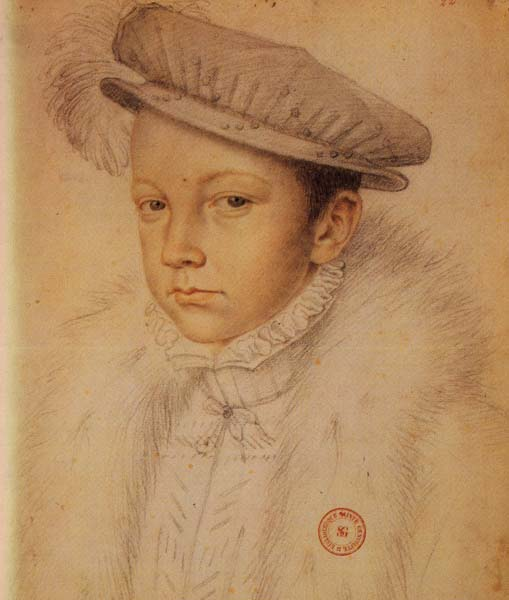
François II, the boy-king under whom the edict was promulgated

The Edict of Romorantin, was a decree designed to alter the prosecution of heretics, promulgated by the King of France, François II, in May 1560. The decree came in the wake of the Amboise conspiracy in which many Protestant Huguenots had participated. Conscious that the previous policy of persecution embodied in the edicts of Châteaubriant and Compiègne had thus failed, the crown and the chancellor altered their strategy by distinguishing for the first time between heretics and rebels. The edict would transfer the prosecution of heretics who had committed no other offence to the ecclesiastical courts, which lacked the power to give death sentences. The edict would be confirmed in January 1561 then superseded, first by the Edict of July, which maintained its provision concerning ecclesiastical courts, and by the more radical Edict of Saint-Germain.

== Persecution and Amboise ==
=== Henri II ===
During the reign of Henry II several attempts were made to crush the nascent Protestant movement in France. With the edicts of Chateaubriant (1551) Compiegne (1557) and Ecouen (1559) he sought to tackle this issue, however distracted as he was by the Habsburg–Valois Wars he was unable to devote his full attention to crushing heresy. When at last those wars were concluded in 1559 with the Treaty of Cateau-Cambrésis he prepared to switch his focus to the matter of heresy, however during a joust celebrating the peace he was struck by a lance, and died, leaving his young son François II on the throne. The substance of his policy had been in the model of the Spanish system, with the Chambre Ardente established to collectively burn accused heretics and special commissioners who would be sent out into the provinces to oversee heresy cases.

=== François II and Amboise ===
His son initially sought to continue and further his policy; with suspected houses of Protestant worship to be razed, and landlords to be prosecuted for harbouring heretics among their tenants. However he faced growing pushback due to the amount of the judiciary that had now converted to Protestantism. Further issues arose in the more militant demonstration of the Amboise conspiracy where a cabal of provincial Protestant nobles attempted to seize him, so as to remove him from the influence of his uncles, François, Duke of Guise and Charles, Cardinal of Lorraine.

=== Aftermath of Amboise ===
With this coup a failure, François was left with a decision of what to do with the eclectic group of rebels involved in the conspiracy. The tumult had involved both nobles like the baron de Castlenau or La Renaudie, but also many unarmed preachers who had believed themselves to be attempting to present a petition to the king. As such while all the nobles were executed, the Edict of Amboise (1560) was promulgated, pardoning those who had been convicted of heresy offences alone, provided they returned to live good Catholic lives. This was explained to the Parlements as a result of the king not desiring to open his reign with bloodshed.

== The edict ==
=== Establishment ===
The edict was put forward whilst Morvilliers, a client of the Guise held the seals of the Chancellorship, as he was filling in for François Olivier due to him being unwell. It derives its name from the royal residence at Romorantin-Lanthenay, where the court was staying whilst it was written.

=== Terms ===
The edict opens with a denouncement of the spread of heresy, and a note on the failure of the methods that have been used against its spread in the past. The crown states it is determined to restore unity to the church through the following terms, as recommended by the queen mother and members of the Conseil du Roi.

Jurisdiction of unarmed heresy cases was transferred from the Parlements to the Episcopal courts run by the clergy. Prosecution of illegal assemblies, preachers and pamphlets was by contrast granted to the Présidaux courts which had been established under Henri II. This court in contrast to the Episcopal courts could sentence a defendant to death. In service of reunifying the church, prelates were to set an example to their flock through residence in their sees, and the living of a moral life. A new penalty was also established, if accusers were found to be false in their testimony, they would be liable for the same punishment they had sought for the defendant. Those who carried arms to their assemblies would be treated as treasonous rebels.

The crown hoped that these measures would avoid libellous accusations and get the court system functioning again in regards to heresy.

== Legacy ==
=== Enforcement ===
While not intended by its authors as a move towards legalisation of Protestantism in France, the removal of the death penalty for heresy was a radical shift in royal policy and the effective end of executions for the crime of heresy alone in France. The edict would not however ever be seriously enforced beyond this provision, as the lower courts either lacked the will or the means to continue prosecutions in the prescribed fashion, particularly in the south of France.

=== Modification ===
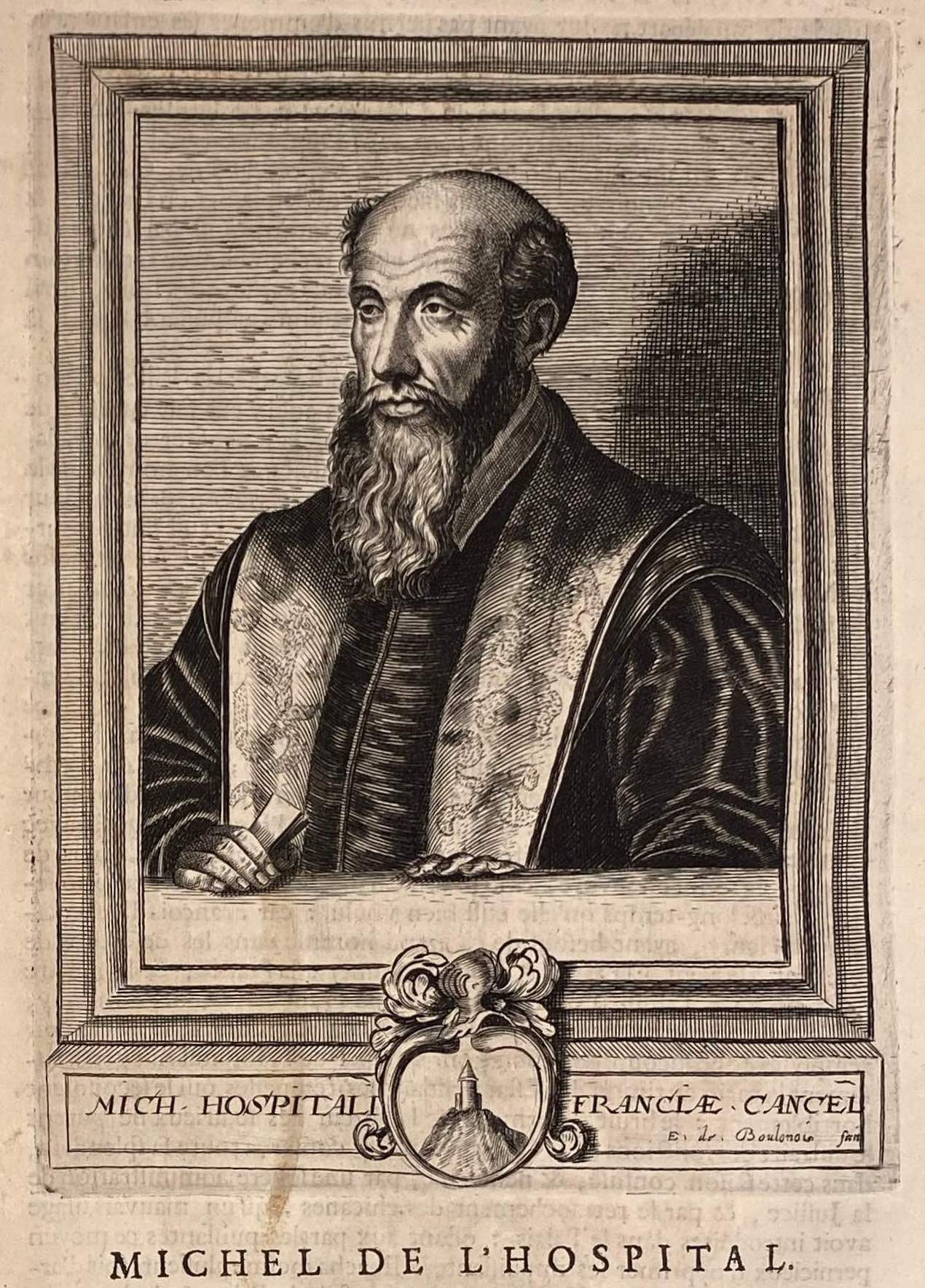
Portrait of Michel de l'Hôpital who succeeded Olivier to the chancellorship and published the edict.

Soon after this edict was written, chancellor Olivier would pass away, and the seals which had been in the temporary possession of Morvilliers, would be passed to the liberal humanist Michel de l'Hôpital. He would oversee the pushing of the edict through Parlement, which was a requirement of registration and would be accomplished fairly swiftly. The edict would not however be published by the crown until July 17 and would be quickly supplemented by a modification in August that added stipulations for bishops and curates to reside in their sees. The edict would come before the scrutiny of the Estates General of 1560-1 and on their recommendation Catherine de' Medici would see it confirmed on January 7, on the agreement that it would stand until such time a church council could be called to settle the religious question.

=== Supersession ===
The Edict of 19 April and July would then embody it in a more substantive fashion later the same year by upholding its central alterations to the prosecution system and penalties for false accusers and adding provisions concerning the prohibition of corporal punishment for heresy, civilians investigating religious crimes of their neighbours and the use of religious epithets. These edicts would all be superseded by the far more ambitious liberal Edict of Saint-Germain in January 1562, which legalised Protestant worship outside of urban areas. Worship inside towns was likewise permitted if just for the members of a household. The fallout from this far reaching edict would be in the beginning of the French Wars of Religion three months later.

== See also ==
- Amboise conspiracy
- Edict of July
- Edict of Saint-Germain
