= Edict of Saint-Germain =

1562 French decree on religious tolerance

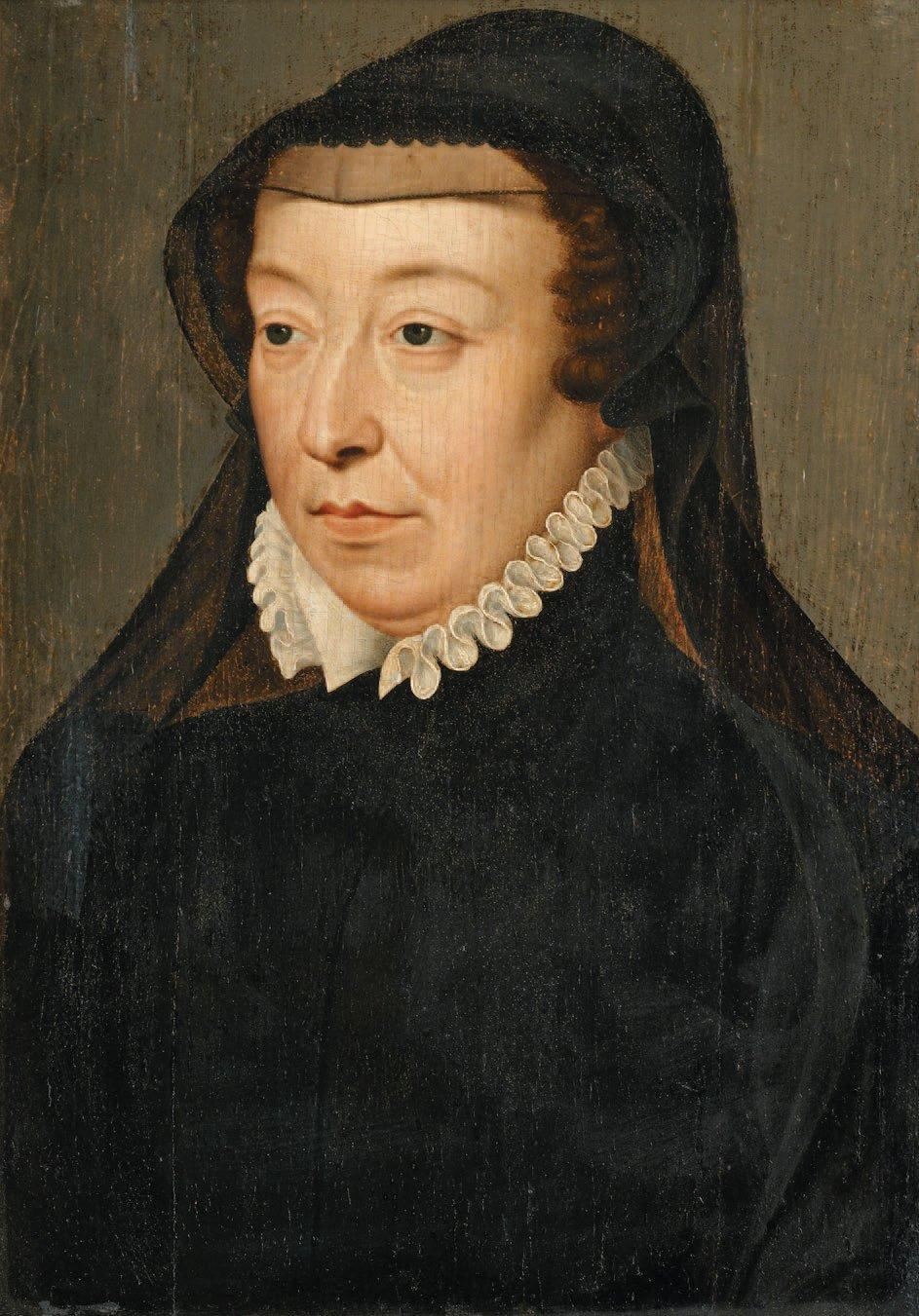
Catherine de' Medici

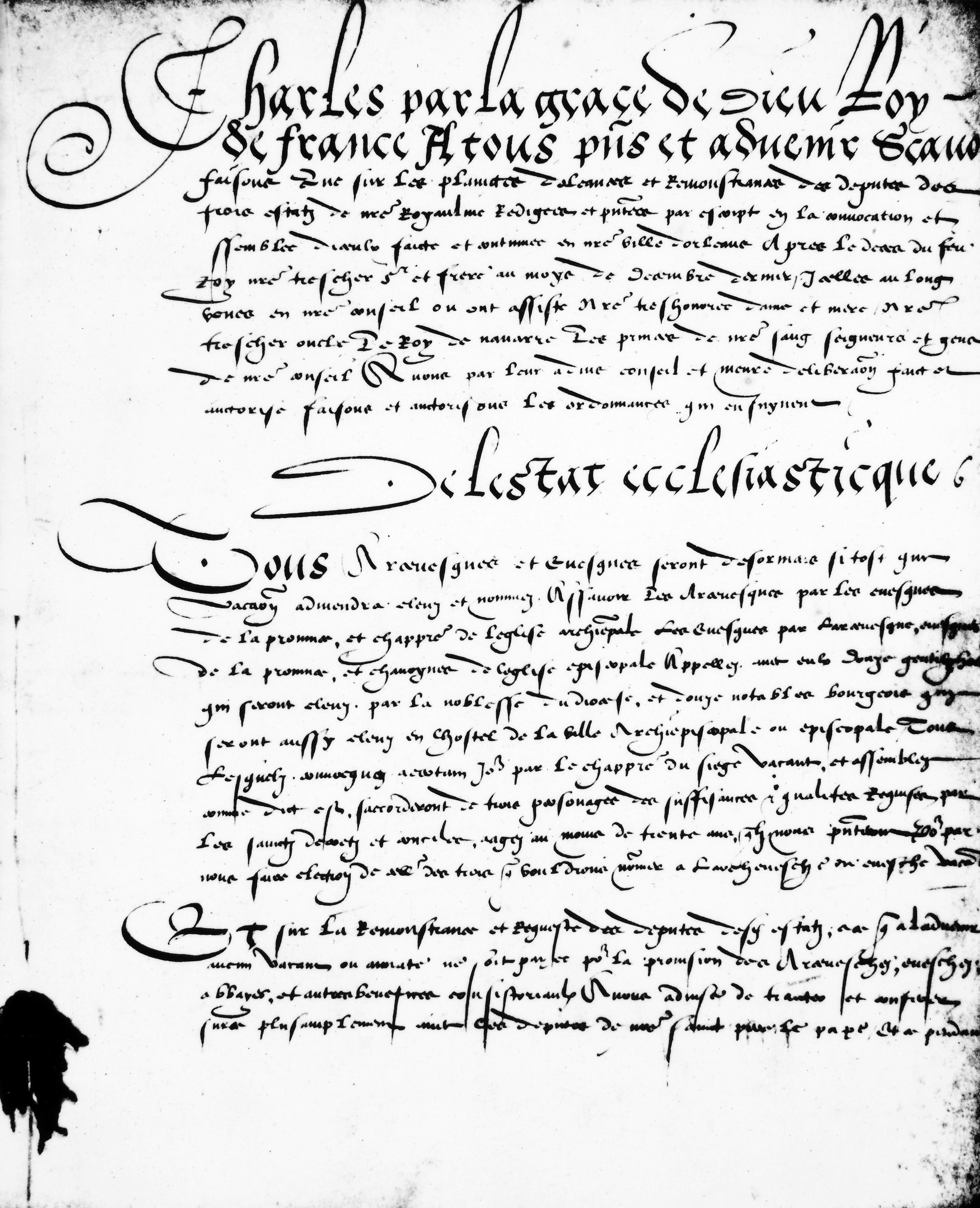
First page of the Edict of Saint Germain

The Edict of Saint-Germain (French: édit de tolérance de Saint-Germain), also known as the Edict of January (Édit de janvier), was a landmark decree of tolerance promulgated by the regent of France, Catherine de' Medici, in January 1562. The edict provided limited tolerance to the Protestant Huguenots in the Catholic realm, though with counterweighing restrictions on their behaviour. The act represented the culmination of several years of slowly liberalising edicts which had begun with the 1560 Edict of Amboise. After two months the Paris Parlement would be compelled to register it by the rapidly deteriorating situation in the capital. The practical impact of the edict would be highly limited by the subsequent outbreak of the first French Wars of Religion but it would form the foundation for subsequent toleration edicts as the Edict of Nantes of 1598.

== Prior legislation ==
During the reign of King Henry II, Protestantism had been subject to persecution in France under the Edicts of Chateaubriant, Ecouen, and Compiègne. This legislation aimed to correct what Henry felt was lax enforcement of prior heresy laws by the local courts, through the re-establishment of the Chambre Ardente and the sending out of special commissioners to take charge of the local court cases.

With the unexpected early death of Henry II during a joust in 1559, this new program of persecution was put on hold, as first the sickly Francis II and then Charles IX became king. Already in the reign of Francis II a new approach began to be forged, with the 1560 Edict of Amboise, which pardoned those convicted of religious offenses on the condition they went on to live good Catholic lives. The further legislation of the Edict of Romorantin in May later that year moved the trial of heresy cases to the purview of the ecclesiastical courts, which did not have the authority to impose death penalties.

This was followed in July 1561, during the reign of Francis' brother Charles IX, with the Edict of July, which reaffirmed Romarantin's move of heresy cases to the ecclesiastical courts and removed the penalty of corporal punishment for heresy, alongside prohibiting investigation of neighbours' houses to find heretical services.

== The road to Saint-Germain ==
In the wake of the Conspiracy of Amboise, a failed attempt by several prominent Huguenots to seize power, the urgency of the need for religious peace was heightened. It was to this end that Charles, Cardinal of Lorraine announced plans for a national religious council to reconcile the two faiths.

Later that year, in an Assembly of Notables at Fontainebleau, the Moyenneur faction aimed to put forward a program of Gallican reforms to quell the abuses of the Catholic church that had angered the Protestants, allowing the faiths to reunify. This attempt would prove naïve, as the Protestant Louis, Prince of Condé came forward with a counterproposal for the two faiths to exist alongside one another, throwing the meeting into disarray. The assembly was however able to endorse plans for a national council to solve the religious question, endorsed in a royal edict on August 31, 1560.

On June 12, 1561, the decision was made to summon the national council on July 20. It would however be delayed and not open until September 9. The meeting which became known as the Colloquy of Poissy would be a failure, with the Calvinists under Theodore Beza unwilling to subscribe to the Confession of Augsburg proposed by Lorraine. Frustrated with the failures of the colloquy, Catherine appealed to Rome instead for doctrinal concessions regarding the taking of the Eucharist in both kinds. This too came to nought.

Unfazed by all this failure, Catherine arranged for carefully chosen moderate deputies from the various Parlements of France to attend a conference at Saint-Germain-en-Laye where they would eventually draw up the edict on January 17, 1562. Alongside two liberal representatives of each Parlement, members of the conseil privé and order of St Michael were invited. The Paris Parlement sent the famous liberal de Thou and the elderly cleric Viole. While the Guises and the Constable boycotted the event, Cardinal Bourbon and Tournon would attend, alongside François de Montmorency and the triumvir Saint André. The proceedings were led by Michel de l'Hôpital who tackled the subject of religion head on with the assembly, in contrast to prior laws where the notion of public order had been emphasised.

The edict written, it would be delivered to the Paris Parlement on January 23.

== Terms ==
=== Introduction ===
The edict was intended to be only a provisional solution to the religious problem, pending the hopefully-reconciliatory outcome of the general church Council of Trent. The edict made clear that it was not to be taken as approval of the 'new religion' but a necessary expedient for as long as the king willed it. The king stated that he had come to see it as necessary because of the provisional nature of the edict of July and on the recommendation of his uncle Antoine of Navarre the princes, the privy councillors and the chief magistrates of the Parlements.

=== Parameters of worship ===
It outlined the spaces and times in which Protestant worship could occur: not in towns or under arms or at night. It could not take place in buildings that had been consecrated as Catholic churches. Sermons could not be held by itinerant preachers within a city. Exceptions were made for noble estates upon which the faith could be practiced freely. Further services could be held within towns in houses if they were only for the members of the household. The crown superseded its previous edict of July such that when Protestants met outside of towns, they were not to be troubled by men of any quality. If people sought to do them harm during their comings and goings, magistrates had to intervene and punish them.

The king's officers were always to be granted access to the sites of worship if they requested entry. A pastor was obligated to inquire into the identity of attendees of a Protestant service so that they could be handed over to the authorities easily if they needed to be arrested.

=== Other terms ===
Protestants would not be allowed to levy taxes towards their religious buildings, and would have to rely on voluntary donations. The political law of the Roman church as it related to marriage and holidays was to be maintained by them, and they were to return any property they had acquired or stolen from the Catholics in the course of the last few troubled years. There could be no creation of laws or magistrates among the Protestants independent from the crowns and Catholic church's offices. All Protestant synods were to occur either with the permission or attendance of the Lieutenant-General of the respective province. Reproachful language against the Catholic church was made a misdemeanour. Iconoclasm and sedition were to be punished with death. Likewise death sentences for distributing prohibited books. Priests were required to swear to uphold this edict, and were ordered not to manufacture further heresies or preach contrary to the Nicene Creed. Clergy of either faith were forbidden from inciting their flocks to violence.

== Registration and resistance ==
=== Paris Parlement ===
The Paris Parlement resisted the registering of the edict, a necessary prerequisite to it becoming law, and remonstrated against the crown. They were backed in their disapproval by the city council, the clergy and the Sorbonne. They were buoyed in their opposition to the edict by the fact their pay was in arrears, which they saw as useful leverage against registering.

==== Edict examined ====
The edict was read before the assembled Parlement on January 24 in the presence of Marshal Montmorency and Antoine of Navarre, with an implied threat that the Parlement should register it immediately. Even the moderate Parlementaires did not accept this, however, and both the ultra Le Maistre and moderate de Harley demanded copies of the edict, so they could apply proper scrutiny to it. Montmorency oversaw the printing of copies at the weekend and by the Monday several copies were in Parlementaire hands. The crown, eager to hurry these proceedings along, sent representatives every couple of days to the Parlement to keep up the pressure. On February 7, having voted, the Parlement announced they could not verify or publish the edict and would send a remonstrance to the crown. To explain this de Thou and Viole were sent back to the crown.

The remonstrance was drawn up on February 12 and signed by Le Maistre and Gayant. They argued in their remonstrance that the solution for disorder was to expel all Protestant pastors, dismissing the notion the Protestants were a sizeable enough minority as to require managing. On February 14 de Thou and Viole were harangued by the king, who explained that the court did not understand the situation of the country like the crown did. He gave assurances, however, that he would always remain a Catholic, and clarified a contentious passage of the bill relating to official attendance at Protestant services, as only being a police matter.

==== Moderates defect ====
This in hand de Thou returned on February 16 to Parlement, announcing he now felt comfortable registering the edict. The other moderates, de Harlay and Baillet, concurred. Yet even with the moderates on their side the crown's forces lacked a majority in the court, and the bill was voted down again on February 18.

Catherine arrived in Paris on February 20, and summoned Viole, who explained that members of the court had suggestions on an alternative proposal. A meeting was arranged for February 23 to discuss this, though only 69 members were present, and they were largely on the conservative edge of the court.

==== Counter proposal ====
The members of the Parlement opposing the edict suggested banning all Protestant services, exiling pastors, banning all non-Catholic property transactions, and making all royal officials sign a profession of faith. Catherine received this on February 25, and prepared her own response to be delivered by Charles, Prince of La Roche-sur-Yon. In this they argued the courts' proposal was simply impractical in the current situation, and that the Parlement was worsening the situation in the country, pushing the Protestants towards arming. Moreover, Charles highlighted other Parlements had already registered the edict and had seen disorder fall resultingly. On March 4 students rioted in the Palais de Justice, demanding the bill be registered and threatening to seize temples if they were not given any.

==== Registration ====
All this finally pushed the Parlement into capitulating, with the avocat du roi du Mesnil who had led the opposition crossing the aisle to support it along with the gens du roi. On March 5 it was agreed to register the edict the following day. Five members, including Le Maistre and Saint-Andre, who led the courts' ultra wing, absented themselves from the final registration. The courts' approval was, moreover, disclaimed in the Parlement's secret register.

=== Other Parlements ===
The Parlement of Rouen proved more malleable, and registered the edict on February 16. The Parlement of Dijon refused to register the edict, and would not be compelled to prior to the outbreak of civil war, which rendered it a dead letter. The Parlement of Aix-en-Provence would prove particularly resistant to registering the edict, and would, after their continued resistance post-Amboise, have their most recalcitrant members dismissed from the Parlement.

== Enforcement and resistance ==
Most of the princes of the realm opposed the edict, with the exceptions of the Prince of Condé, Antoine III de Croy, Count of Porcien, and Charles, Prince of La Roche-sur-Yon. Antoine of Navarre, who was Lieutenant-General of the Kingdom, voted against the edict in council, and appealed for Guise to return to Paris to aid his opposition.

Several commissioners had been sent out into the regions of Guyenne, Languedoc and Provence in late 1561, with the hopes of quieting the disorder that had engulfed the provinces over the previous year. To achieve this they were given broad powers, and with the establishment of the Edict of Saint-Germain, they were tasked with ensuring its registration and enforcement in their respective areas. They were provided with assistance from the lieutenant-governors of their respective provinces to offer support, alongside the ability to refer cases up to the court if they proved tricky to determine.

=== Provence ===
In Provence, the commissioners Fumée and Ponnat were faced with the rebellious first consul Flassans, who had taken up arms and was terrorising the region's Protestants. He refused to meet the commissioners or disarm. With the authorities of Aix refusing entry to the commissioners they set themselves up at Marignane and called officers out to meet with them; only Flassans refused among the municipal officers. The clergy capitulated and met with them on February 5. This allowed them access to the town and they set about working on their commission. After the defeat of Flassans in the field, it was decided not to prosecute his followers. In the meanwhile they set about replacing recalcitrant consulate members in April, though by September all of them had been let back into the political fold, including Flassans. Such were the difficulties enforcing the edict that Provence would be exempt from the Edict of Amboise regarding Protestant churches.

=== Languedoc ===
In Languedoc the situation was reversed, and it was the task of the commissioners to restore the Catholic clergy to their office, and remove the Protestants from the churches they had occupied in the towns. The Huguenots of Nîmes and Montpellier petitioned the commissioners to be allowed to continue private worship in the towns they occupied. In this task the commissioners were largely unsuccessful.

=== Guyenne ===
In Guyenne, the commissioners Compaing and Girard were delayed in their arrival, and thus de Montluc and de Burie oversaw the appointment of two replacement commissioners in their stead, who lacked the broad remit of the royally assigned ones. The Bordeaux Parlement sought to interfere, arguing it had the local knowledge to better and more affordably provide justice in the region, despite this being the very thing the commissioners were trying to avoid. When Compaing and Girard finally arrived, they quickly became unpopular with the local nobility and Montluc, who perceived their decisions as favouring the Protestant party. Burie and Montluc argued against their interpretation of the Edict of Saint-Germain, saying it shouldn't introduce Huguenot ministers into areas they had not been in before. The Cardinal of Armagnac joined in these attacks on the commissioners claiming they had granted minister requests without consulting the local clergy (which was not a provision of Amboise.) With all these attacks they were finally dismissed from their offices.

== Vassy and civil war ==
Having been called back to Paris by Navarre, Francis, Duke of Guise stopped en route on March 1 at the town of Vassy, which had become a Protestant stronghold in the largely Catholic countryside of Champagne. Enraged by the sound of Protestant bell ringing in the town, he and his company of gentlemen decided to enter, on the pretext of hearing mass. In the town he was further incensed to find that the Protestants were meeting in the castle district, which was on his property.

Controversy arose later over the legality of the service Guise had encountered. While this meeting took place after the issuance of the Edict of Saint-Germain, it took place before the Parlement of Paris had been forced to register it.

Guise sent out a gentleman ahead of him, who got into an altercation at the door to the barn where the Protestants were worshipping. Violence ensued and, as Guise's company rushed forward, a massacre began, with 50 parishioners killed. Continuing onto Paris despite Catherine's orders for him to come to her and explain himself, he entered the city to a hero's welcome.

In the city Condé and his men were present, and thus a potential powder keg if he and Guise crossed paths. Recognising this, Catherine ordered both to vacate the city, but only Condé complied, heading to Orléans where he raised the standard of rebellion on April 2 beginning the first French War of Religion.

== See also ==
- Edict of Fontainebleau, 1685 revocation of the Edict of Nantes by Louis XIV
- Declaration of the Rights of Man and of the Citizen, 1789 civil rights document of the French Revolution
