= Michel de l'Hôpital =

French statesman and lawyer (1506–1573)

- Chancellor of France
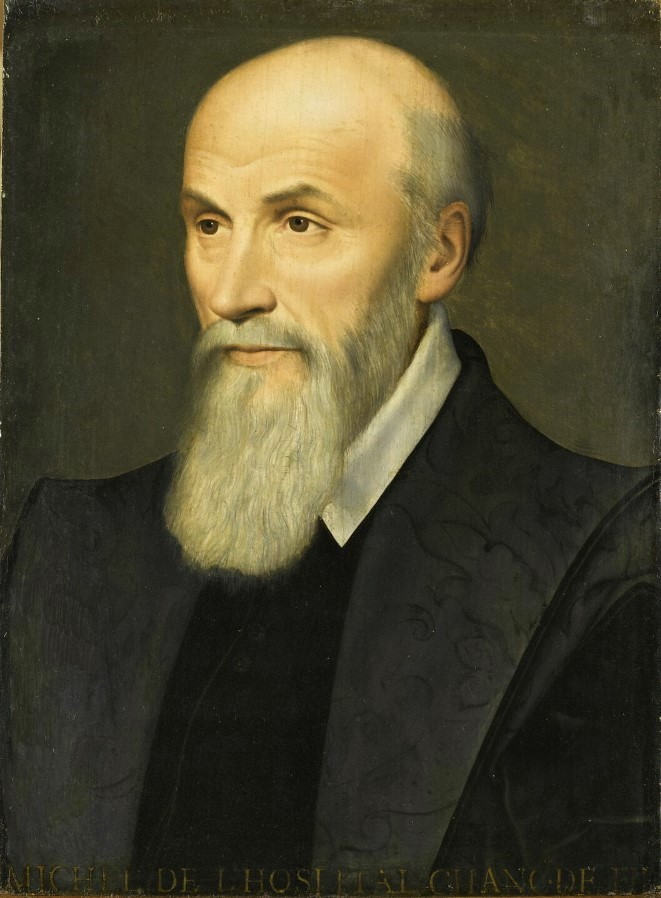
- Portrait of the chancellor
- Born: c. 1506
- Died: 13 March 1573
- Spouse: Marie Morin
- Issue: Magdalaine de l'Hôpital

Michel de l'Hôpital (or l'Hospital; 1506 – 13 March 1573) was a French lawyer, diplomat and chancellor during the latter Italian Wars and the early French Wars of Religion. The son of a doctor in the service of Charles III, Duke of Bourbon he spent his early life exiled from France at Bourbon's and then the emperors court. When his father entered the service of the House of Lorraine, he entered the patronage network of Charles, Cardinal of Lorraine. Through his marriage to Marie Morin, he acquired a seat in the Parlement of Paris. In this capacity he drew up the charges for the king, concerning the defenders of Boulogne who surrendered the city in 1544, before taking a role as a diplomat to the Council of Trent in 1547. The following year he assisted Anne d'Este in the details of her inheritance to ensure she could marry Francis, Duke of Guise.

In 1553 he entered Lorraine's service, providing support to the family in return for receiving offices from them. That year they secured for him the position of maître des requêtes for the hôtel du roi, an important post. The following year he was elevated to the chambre des comptes as président, granting him considerable influence in the financial administration of the kingdom. With his patron assuming overall control of the kingdoms finances in the late 1550s, he entered the conseil privé. Early into the reign of Francis II the old chancellor, François Olivier died. Lorraine nominated L'Hôpital as his replacement. An energetic reformer, L'Hôpital moved into conflict with the Parlements to ensure the passing of the Edict of Romorantin. Later that year, conscious of the scale of the financial and religious problems that were affecting the kingdom, he was among those advocating for an Assembly of Notables. The Assembly in turn called for a Estates General, which L'Hôpital opened and sought to direct towards widescale reforms. Unable to achieve quite what he sought, he fought the Parlement to push through the Ordinance of Orléans that resulted from the sessions.

Upon the death of Francis II, L'Hôpital did not fall from the centre of royal politics with his patrons. Instead, he supported Queen mother Catherine de' Medici in her religious policy which increasingly put him at odds with Lorraine. He helped formulate and championed the Edict of 19 April, the Edict of July and the Edict of Saint-Germain. The former two which moderated persecution of Protestantism and the latter of which legalised Protestant worship in France. Throughout this he found himself in opposition to Parlement, which resisted both the intrusions on their authority and any legalisation of Protestantism. After the first civil war in the French Wars of Religion, L'Hôpital entered his period of ascendency. He championed King Charles IX's decision to declare his majority at Rouen, to punish the Paris Parlement for its failure to register the peace treaty. He successfully opposed Lorraine's attempt to implement the Tridentine decrees upon his return from Trent. The next year he accompanied the court on its grand tour, with L'Hôpital berating each Parlement in turn for their impudence and failure to follow the king's will. When the court stopped at Moulins he promulgated a wide reaching set of legal reforms, which sought to combat Venal office, severely curtail the number of jurisdictions and overlapping law codes, and limit the power of governors and certain judges to interpret and execute justice that rightfully flowed from the king. By now his influence was waning and he was forced to abandon much of the edict due to the crown's monetary needs during the second civil war. Lorraine had by now returned to court, and he succeeded in besting L'Hôpital concerning a petition raised by the Dijon Parlement against him.

During the civil war he negotiated with the Prince of Condé who was besieging Paris, and urged concessions to the rebels, for which he received a cold reception. After the Peace of Longjumeau in March 1568, he retired from court in May, increasingly aware that his opinions were no longer received well by Catherine or the court. Returning to court in September he made a last attempt to oppose the crown's acceptance of alienated church lands in return for a war on heresy offered by the Pope. Failing in this he was relieved of his seals of office, and though he remained chancellor until his death, he would no longer exercise its authority. Threatened during the Massacre of Saint Bartholomew he and his daughter survived under Catherine and the duke of Guise's protection, he died in March the following year, his daughter inheriting his lands under the administration of his wife.

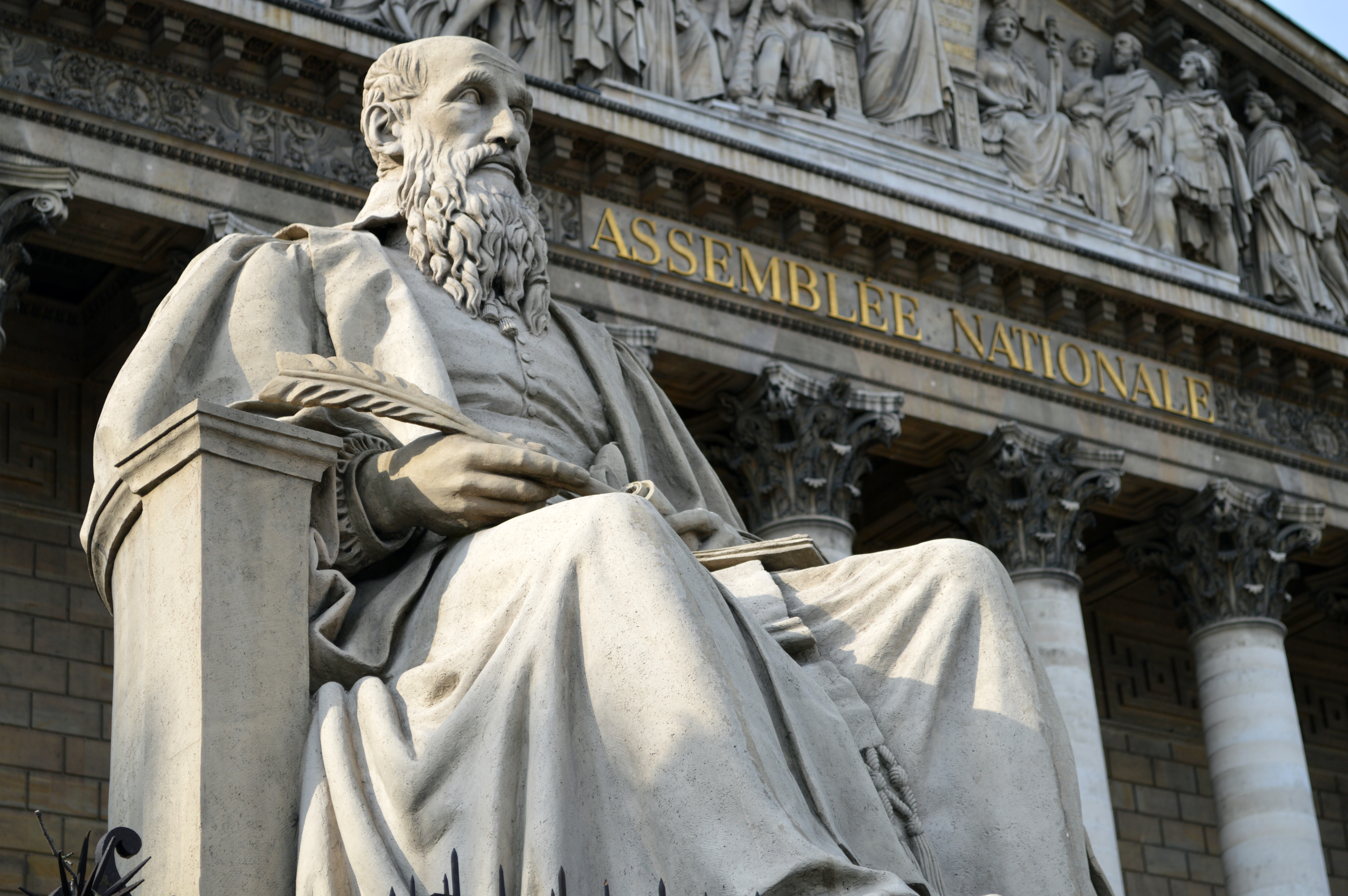
Statue of De l'Hospital by Louis-Pierre Deseine in front of the Palais Bourbon in Paris, installed in 1810.

== Early life and family ==
=== Family ===
Michel de l'Hôpital was born in 1506 in the town of Aigueperse, the son of the duchess of Lorraine's physician. His father also provided medical assistance to the Constable de Bourbon, whose treason in 1525 forced L'Hôpital and his family into an Italian exile. While in Italy, L'Hôpital received his doctorate in law. The family travelled with Bourbon to Spain and Italy in his travels before the Constable's death in 1527. After this the family moved to the court of Lorraine, where his father finished out his life in service to the duchess of Lorraine. Michel having studied law in Italy now studied also in France to further his education.

=== Daughter ===
During the Massacre of Saint Bartholomew, L'Hôpital's only daughter Magdelaine was caught up in the capital. Due to both her Protestantism and her father's religious policy in the proceeding decade she was at great risk of being killed. The Duke of Guise took her under his protection. She would marry Robert de Hurault, a robe noble. In 1555 the Cardinal of Lorraine became godfather to his recently born grandson.

=== Views ===
L'Hôpital was one of several leading French figures who was interested in the philosophy of stoicism. To this end and beyond, L'Hôpital was a great advocate of learning Greek. L'Hôpital opined that there was no provincial or town governor in France who had not in their tenure committed enough graft with the king's money to be executable if the king willed it. He was frustrated by how infrequently the estates had met in the last century, viewing them as a valuable mechanism of receiving feedback on government policies. He was overall autocratic in disposition, arguing that the purpose of the estates was to provide their complaints and receive redress from the king, while the Parlement's were a vehicle through which the king delivered his justice.

=== Contemporary Opinion ===
L'Hôpital's detractors characterised his religious policy as proof that he was a crypto-Protestant. Montaigne referred to both him and François Olivier as being "men extraordinarily sufficient, and endowed with no vulgar virtue [...] great Chancellor of France".

== Reign of Francis I ==
=== Marriage ===
In 1532 he married the daughter of the lieutenant-criminel of the Châtelet, Marie Morin, receiving as part of the dowry his entrance to the Paris Parlement Now serving as a councillor in the Parlement, he was afforded valuable experience for his dealings with the body as chancellor. The Parlement would feel betrayed by his later attempts to curtail their power, due to him having once been one of their own.

=== Lèse majesté ===
As a councillor, he took responsibility for drawing up the charges against the chief defenders of Boulogne (the seigneur de Vervins), who had surrendered the important port town to the English in 1544. Vervins was condemned to death. Marshal de Biez was likewise condemned but would not be killed, with others sent into exile or imprisoned.

In 1547 he was made French ambassador to the Council of Trent.

== Reign of Henri II ==
=== Anne d'Este ===
In 1548 he was in Ferrara, where he assisted Anne d'Este in her renunciation of the Este inheritance that was a precondition for her marriage to the duke of Guise. He accompanied her on her journey back to France to meet her new husband.

During the 1550s, L'Hôpital served as chancellor to the duchess of Savoy, Marguerite, sister to Henri II. Marguerite was sympathetic to Protestantism, and allowed L'Hôpital to obtain a chair of jurisprudence for François Hotman, a virulent Protestant polemicist. In gratitude to the chancellor, Hotman dedicated his work Anti-Tribonian to L'Hôpital.

=== Lorraine ===
In 1553 he entered the service of the Cardinal of Lorraine, serving them as a voracious polemicist and was rewarded by the family with the post of maître des requêtes for the hôtel du roi. He denounced those who characterised the house of Lorraine as 'foreigners', arguing that France rightfully extended to the Rhine. He called his benefactor, Lorraine, the 'hope of the French race'. He further praised the valour of François, Duke of Guise. The following year, Cheverny, future chancellor of France, purchased his councillor seat on the Paris Parlement.

=== Chambre des comptes ===
He took up the position of president of the chambres des comptes in 1554, this granted him experience with the kingdoms financial administration, and also a place in the conseil privé. In 1558 in his capacity at the chambres des comptes he offered a panegyric at the wedding of the dauphin Francis II to Mary, Queen of Scots in which he boasted that the marriage would subdue England without the need for a war or violence.

While much of the French military aristocracy was disgusted by the Peace of Cateau-Cambrésis, which brought the Italian Wars to a close, L'Hôpital praised the treaty, writing a 'carmen de pax' in support of it. While an opponent of the war he had found it necessary to balance this with support for his patrons the Guise, as demonstrated in the poem he composed celebrating the duke of Guise's expedition into Italy in 1557. He wrote further poems in celebration of Guise's capture of Calais in 1558.

== Reign of Francis II ==
=== Finance ===
With Cardinal Lorraine taking charge of the kingdoms finances on the death of Henri II, L'Hôpital served as his chief financial adviser. To salvage the kingdoms credit, he recommended to the Cardinal a radical program in which loans would be rescheduled, taxes raised and spending drastically cut. These policies were met with strong resistance in the provinces. In Normandie, a forced loan of 800,000 livres on the province went unpaid, even decades later the hardship induced by attempts to raise the funds was recalled by those in the province. Peasants fled their villages to avoid having to pay. The size of the army was slashed, but many soldiers were left in arrears over pay, and entered opposition to the regime.

=== Chancellor ===
During the discord that convulsed the kingdom with the Conspiracy of Amboise in early 1560, L'Hôpital was absent from the kingdom, returning to the court in May 1560 before receiving confirmation as chancellor the month after on 30 June 1560 with the support of the Guise, Lorraine recommending him personally to the king for the post.

=== Assembly of notables ===
In May 1560, L'Hôpital oversaw the passing of the first religious edict that moderated persecution, the Edict of Romorantin. This edict had been formulated before his return to court. Upon presenting it to Parlement the body resisted its registration, and he was forced to push it through, regardless it would remain unimplemented, and he later afforded the body a backtrack as regards their authority over illegal assemblies. With the regime floundering in the aftershocks of Amboise, and with continued discord rocking the kingdom in the south, L'Hôpital was among those who pushed for the calling of an Assembly of Notables, to examine a potential package of financial and religious measures. Only through financial, judicial and religious reform could the kingdom be saved, in L'Hôpital's estimation. L'Hôpital opened the Assembly with a speech to the assembled grandees. In it he characterised the kingdom as a sick man, with the package of reforms to represent a cure to the ailments that destabilised and weakened the country.

The assembly soon found itself threatened with derailment by an altercation between Admiral Coligny and Cardinal Lorraine after the former brought forth a petition for Protestants to have temples in which to worship much to the latter's consternation. L'Hôpital took charge of the situation, bringing the conversation away back to financial matters.

In July 1560 L'Hôpital promulgated a law reforming how inheritance worked for the children of second marriages. He issued several sumptuary laws in April 1561 and January 1563. He established a special jurisdiction in Paris for lawsuits between merchants. Expanding this to other towns while the court resided at Moulins in 1566. While staying at Moulins, an edict was also issued outlining the special circumstances by which the royal domain could be temporarily alienated, through the supervision of the Parlement and chambre des comptes.

In September 1560 L'Hôpital spoke before the Paris Parlement, he informed them that daily new word was arriving at court of various seditions across the country. He held responsible for this 'those who use the cloak of religion', an understanding of his, in which the pretext of religion was used to camouflage other grievances. The Parlement frustrated with him for his chastisements, retorted that the true cause of disorder in France was the presence of two Protestants among the great offices of state.

=== Condé ===
The Prince of Condé had failed to show up for the Assembly of Notables, along with his brother the only prince to do so. He was conscious that he was implicated in both the Conspiracy of Amboise and the later disorders in Lyon. The court was not however to be denied his presence and he was summoned to bring himself to the Estates General that was shortly to convene in December. Arriving at court he was promptly arrested, and a trial began on 13 November. Though he repeatedly attempted to derail the proceedings a verdict was at last reached, guilt of lèse majesté. Two judges however refused to sign the conclusion, L'Hôpital, and du Mortier. Condé would be released in December after the death of Francis II made his imprisonment politically untenable. L'Hôpital was responsible for calling the trial to a close.

== Reign of Charles IX ==
=== Estates General ===
L'Hôpital gave the opening address at the Estates General in 1560. During his speech he first cautioned radical Catholics, for their violence against Protestants and general intolerance. He then turned his ire on radical Protestants, chiding them for their provocative impatience in establishing a new order. He emphasised that both Catholic and Protestant must wait until such time as a church council could be convened, to restore unity to the Christian church. In the meanwhile he stressed that it was important for all parties, to be peaceful and law abiding. The Council of Trent had recently been declared reconvened by the Pope, as such L'Hôpital hoped that the delegates would avoid matters of religious debate, leaving those to the bishops and religiously learned.

He provided the assembled delegates an appraisal on the kingdoms finances, informing them all pensions were at least two years in arrears. He further informed the estates that the crown was in 43 million livres worth of debt, and that the only solution was to raise taxes, the deputies baulked at this notion, so the crown turned to the alienation of church land to remain afloat. In financial matters, the estates would recommend certain reforms to the system of the guilds. L'Hôpital however desired to go much further than the estates, and in the ordinance of Orléans he outlined an attack on the guild system. His aims were to reduce the burdens of the apprenticeship system, and release the hold that the guilds had over the labour market. He saw the engine to achieving this as being through attacks on the confraternity system, which operated alongside the guilds and strengthened them. He ordered that their capital be distributed to local schools in the baillages. This attempt to divest the guilds of their capital, would not go unanswered however, the guilds in retaliation, reinvented the confraternity as a religious organisation, and found strong support among the Catholic ultra party. This allowed them to weather his attacks until they faded in 1567 with his loss of influence.

An informal reconciliation between Guise and Montmorency, known as the 'triumvirate' was agreed in April 1561 to oppose the religious policy being pursued by L'Hôpital and Catherine de' Medici. He was also in April attempting to drive the Ordinance of Orléans through the Parlement, issuing lettres de jussion to command them to do so without further protestation. Facing remonstrances he tried to court the senior judges, inviting them to council with the prospect of involvement in high affairs of the state, however the Parlementaires were uninterested and several more rounds of lettres de jussion and remonstrances followed into November of that year. In January 1563 he attempted to mollify Parlementaire opposition through a decree outlining that extraordinary courts established by the crown would be illegal without the Parlement having provided commission to the judges.

=== Religious toleration ===
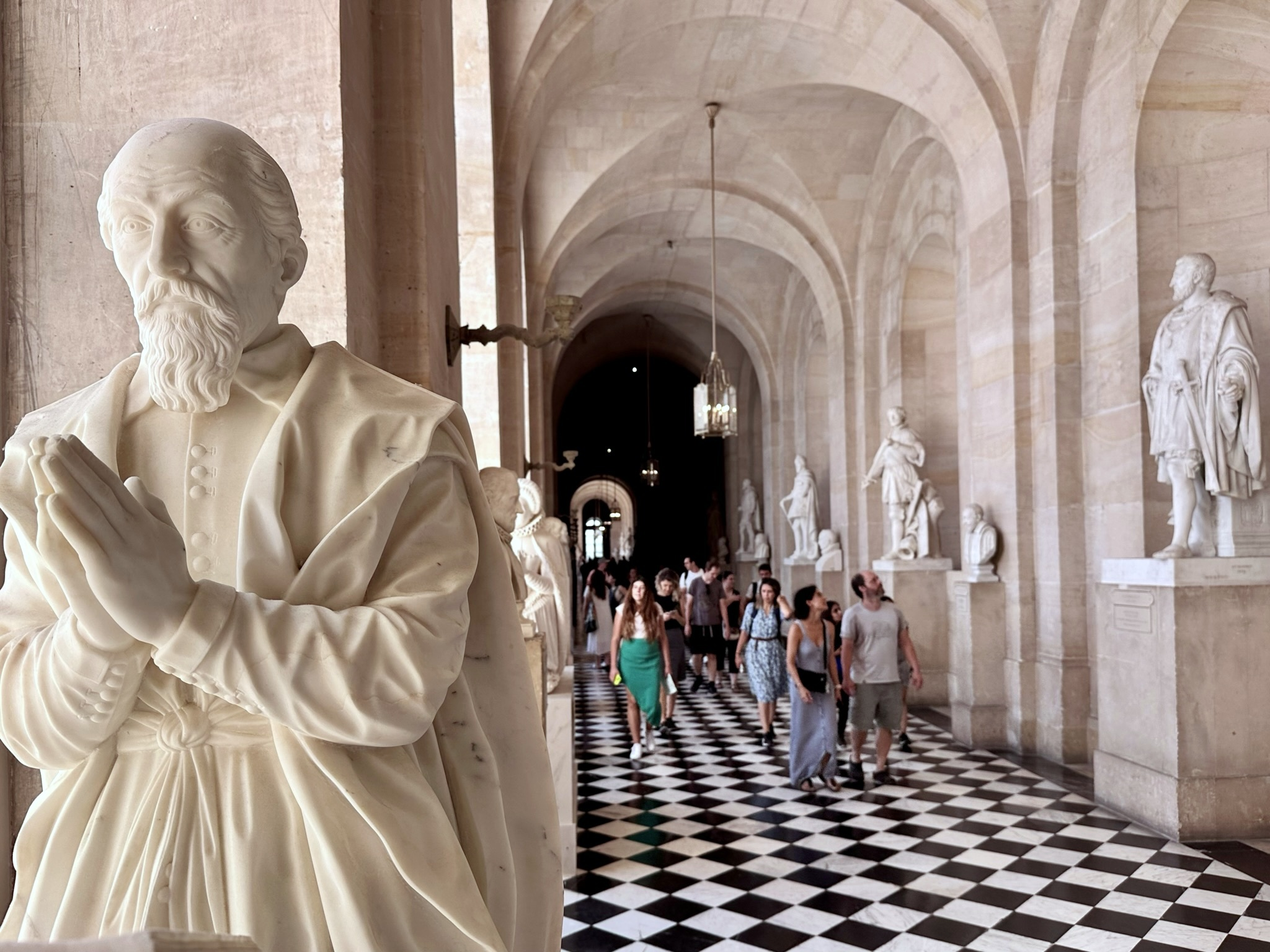
Statue of L'Hôpital in the Palace of Versailles

That same month an edict was issued that prohibited the use of the epithets 'Papiste' and 'Huguenot', two terms that L'Hôpital had taken issue with during his address to the estates in December. The religious situation in France continued to deteriorate in 1561, in June of that year L'Hôpital warned the Paris Parlement that it would be necessary to stop Catholic children from parading through the streets with crosses, as this was viewed as incendiary by the Protestants, making it liable to cause a riot. That same month he shaped the legislation that would form the Edict of July, which affirmed the prohibition on Protestant worship, but at the same time formally removed the penalty of death for heresy, which had been de facto abolished in the Edict of Romorantin, and prohibited those who were not officers of the crown from investigating their neighbours houses in search of heretical worship, which effectively legalised private worship. During the debates in the pourparler that formulated the edict, L'Hôpital had been keen to go further, arguing that the ban on Protestantism was no longer workable, however the council voted against legalisation. In September 1561, a council, along the lines of the one L'Hôpital had envisioned at the Estates General, convened at Colloquy of Poissy, with leading Catholics and Protestants in attendance. L'Hôpital opened the proceedings with a call for the assembled Catholic clergy to listen to the Protestant speakers, in the interests of reaching a harmonious position. Despite proposals of uniting the faiths around the Confession of Augsburg, talks with break down into acrimony over the subject of the Eucharist, leaving the talks to end in failure.

=== Edict of Saint-Germain ===
On 3 January 1562, L'Hôpital gave a speech in front of the Paris Parlement in which he argued for the present necessity of religious toleration for Protestantism, as the only alternative to the kingdom descending into civil war. That same month he aided in the engineering of the Edict of Saint-Germain, which provided formal toleration to Protestantism, pending the reconciliation of the church in a religious council, during the meeting at Saint-Germain, he admitted that the Edict of July had never been quietly repealed, with no window of its implementation. He was assisted in his efforts by Catherine, the Protestant Admiral Coligny and Theodore Beza, the Protestant cleric. The edict immediately ran into furious opposition from the Parlements and much of the Catholic nobility. A little taken aback, Catherine attempted to arrange another Colloquy, such as that which had occurred at Poissy, L'Hôpital took charge of outlining the subjects that would be debated at the conference, however it would be an ignominious failure, breaking down over the first topic of the agenda 'images', shortly after which it was dissolved. L'Hôpital defended the necessity of the edict in front of the Parlement, arguing the only alternative was the expulsion or execution of the Protestants, neither of which was a realistic course of action.

In the wake of the Massacre of Wassy, the kingdom rapidly descended towards civil war, as Protestants began to take arms and seize towns. In the chaotic atmosphere, the Spanish ambassador hoped to gain advantage for his king, and moved that the influence of L'Hôpital was destructive on the crown due to his 'evil reputation', and thus hoping for his removal, however the crown did not oblige.

=== Ascendency ===
During the period 1563–1566, L'Hôpital and his faction were ascendant on the council. In March 1563 the first war of religion was brought to a close in the Edict of Amboise, which granted limited toleration to Protestantism. L'Hôpital opined that the experience of civil war, would induce French citizens to be more forgiving of their neighbours, and less quick to cause disorder. Much of Catholic France was horrified at the terms, and attempted to resist the edicts implementation. De Thou of the Paris Parlement was summoned to meet with L'Hôpital in May, and despite his best efforts to appease the chancellor was compelled to withdraw the courts policy that all its members complete a profession of faith. In August 1563, Charles IX was declared an adult in a session of the Parlement of Rouen. His majority was combined with a formal proclamation of the Edict of Amboise. It was hoped by L'Hôpital and Catherine that by packaging the two together it would be harder for the court to oppose the peace. Rouen was chosen as the location in which to declare the majority by the pair as a way to punish the Paris Parlement for its resistance to the policies they had been promulgating in the previous years, the Parlement was greatly wounded by this blow to its prestige as the premier Parlement. The Parlement remonstrated the king, refusing to recognise either his majority or the permanence of the peace, complaining about the linking of the two. The king reprimanded those representatives that came to visit him, telling them that the role of the Parlement was to administer justice, not to be his mentors, or custodians of the kingdom.

=== Trent ===
In February 1564, the Council of Trent at last concluded, and with this Lorraine returned to the kingdom, hoping to ensure that the councils recommendations would be adopted by the kingdom. L'Hôpital positioned himself in opposition to Lorraine, arguing that the Tridentine decrees would violate the Gallican privileges of France. He further argued that Lorraine was attempting through the presenting of these suggestions, to achieve through council what he had failed to achieve on the battlefield in 1562, i.e. the domination of France by ultra-Catholicism. Lorraine reacted with outrage to these suggestions, characterising L'Hôpital as an ingrate who failed to appreciate what the Guise family had done for him in the past decades. He further shouted that he was no longer sure what religion L'Hôpital followed. L'Hôpital retorted that the office of maître des requêtes that they had afforded him was a minor privilege and while he remained forever grateful for what they had afforded him, the debts that he owed their family could not be weighed against his service towards the king. As a parting shot he remarked that it was the duke of Guise who had brought the kingdom into discord with the Massacre of Wassy in 1562. This spat concluded, the council voted on the adoption of the councils findings, and refused to validate them all, much to Lorraine's disgust.

=== Grand tour ===
Conscious of the crisis of legitimacy that faced the regime, Catherine decided to embark upon a grand tour of the kingdom, to ensure the implementation of the edict, and further to instil the young king's authority on the magnates of the kingdom. The court set off in grand fashion that month, with 2000 persons accompanying them on the journey, including many of the leading nobles of the kingdom such as Constable Montmorency and Cardinal Bourbon. Each of the kingdom's Parlements was to be visited during the royal journey, with L'Hôpital tasked to provide a stern talking to the bodies at each stop, warning them to register the edict and respect the authority of the king. L'Hôpital offered the particularly reticent parlementaires of Aix-en-Provence sharp words during the courts visit warning them that the king was unhappy with their 'disobedience' and the parlementaires as his children should obey their father the king. His speeches, like those of the king that proceeded them, were met with silence by the Parlements. While the court was staying at Crémieux, L'Hôpital modified the terms of the Edict of Amboise, prohibiting the Protestant church from holding provincial synods.

=== Moulins ===
In February 1566 the court arrived at Moulins where an Assembly of Notables was convened with most of the kingdoms grandees in attendance. L'Hôpital presented to them his thesis that the root of evil in the kingdom was the poor administration of justice. He denounced the 'excesses' of those in positions of authority to exercise it engaging in 'tyrannical legislation, venality, avarice, superfluous office' and other ills. He then targeted his attacks towards the organs of law, the Parlements, decrying them for the presumptuousness they showed in interpreting the king's laws and their sedentary nature. He spoke nostalgically of the reign of Louis IX when the laws were few and simple and such a model that foreign nations presented their disputes in it.

Later that month L'Hôpital presented the Ordinance of Moulins, a judicial reform package composed of 86 articles. The ordinance severely curtailed the Parlements powers, allowing the king to put laws into effect even if the Parlement was remonstrating him, or refused to register the edict. The power of the governor was also attacked, with the office no longer to afford the possibility of providing pardons, raising taxes and establishing fairs. Communal judges had much of their authority stripped, reduced to overseeing petty crimes and 1500 offices were abolished or suppressed. Confraternities and leagues were banned. The edict of Amboise was upheld. This edict posed a serious threat to many of the kingdoms grandees, who utilised their positions as governors for the purpose of graft. Though the edict had demanded immediate registration in its second clause, the Parlement ignored this, and L'Hôpital was forced to accept many modifications to the Ordinace in July. During 1566, L'Hôpital created a new fiscal office of Surintendant des Finances, appointing the religiously moderate Marshal Cossé as its first incumbent.

While the court was still residing in Moulins, Lorraine arrived with a petition from the Parlement of Dijon. The Parlement was frustrated that a new interpretative declaration had been made concerning the edict of Amboise, by which Protestant ministers would be allowed to visit the dying and instruct the young. Lorraine argued in front of the assembled grandees that this was a method of proselytizing. This bombshell petition aroused the interest of the council, as it became clear L'Hôpital had not consulted any member of the council before issuing it. L'Hôpital acidly remarked to Lorraine that he had 'returned to court to trouble them', causing Lorraine to fire back that L'Hôpital, who owed his position as chancellor to him, dare say that he arrived as a trouble. From here the council descended into chaos, only salvaged when Catherine intervened. She ordered the interpretative declaration burned and that going forth, L'Hôpital be forbidden from sealing edicts without the councils consent. Lorraine, arrogant in victory declared L'Hôpital always sought to be 'cock of the dunghill' and opined that he would refuse to attend council meetings in the man's presence going forward.

L'Hôpital offered his support in July 1567 to several interpretative declarations concerning the edict of Amboise. The area in which Protestantism was prohibited from being practiced was expanded from the city of Paris, to the wider region of the Île de France. Concurrently Protestants were to be barred from public office in the governorship. While these policies appear out of step with his wider program, L'Hôpital was keen to quiet the disorder in Paris, which had been growing more severe and threatening in the previous years.

=== Meaux ===
The Surprise of Meaux, in which elements of the Protestant nobility attempted a coup to seize the king and kill Lorraine, fatally discredited L'Hôpital's project in the eyes of Catherine. L'Hôpital was with the court when word came that a Protestant force of cavalry was assembling nearby to attack them. He and the Constable advocated for holding firm at Monceaux. The Guise and Duke of Nemours argued by contrast that the court should flee to the safety of Paris. Catherine chose to follow the latter course and the court conducted a fighting retreat to the capital. The failure of the surprise led to the resumption of civil war. Besieged in the capital by Condé's forces, Catherine dispatched L'Hôpital, Morvillier and Marshal Vielleville to negotiate with the prince. Condé was feeling confident in his position, and negotiated aggressively. He demanded that all taxes implemented since the reign of Louis XII be abolished, that four surety towns (including the key border towns of Metz, Calais and Le Havre) be granted to him to secure his position in the kingdom, and that full religious toleration be granted everywhere in France. He further demanded the prosecution of the Guise and the expulsion of Italian financiers. These demands were entirely unacceptable to the negotiators, but they had been dispatched to buy time for an army to be raised by Constable Montmorency, not to reach terms. By this time, Catherine was increasingly weary of L'Hôpital, and when he proposed certain compromises the court could make to end the crisis, including the dispatch of a further embassy to the Protestant leaders so that they might better understand their intentions and aims, she accused him of bearing some responsibility for the current situation. To fund the mercenaries required to prosecute the civil war, L'Hôpital's list of offices to be suppressed on the death of their current holder, a key component of the Ordinance of Moulins was cancelled. Venality was indeed expanded in January 1568, allowing officials to pay a portion of the cost of their posts for the right to have their venal office be inherited.

=== Fall from favour ===
Though the war was formally brought to a close at Longjumeau, it quickly became apparent the peace was ephemeral in the following months, with sporadic fighting continuing in the south. L'Hôpital, who believed in the peace found himself increasingly at odds with the rest of the royal council, that wanted to overturn the peace and return to war. In May a royal council meeting met to discuss the problems of ensuring obedience towards the peace. L'Hôpital blamed the youth of the king as encouraging his vassals to disobey him. Morvillier, another moderate on the council disagreed, arguing that religious plurality was causing issues, as much as the king's youth. That same month, he withdrew from court, dispirited that his influence on the direction of royal policy appeared to be at an end. Soon thereafter he asked to be relieved of his office. Having been informed that negotiations were under way between the crown and the Pope, to receive the alienation of church land in return for the revocation of the Edict of Amboise and a resumption of war on heresy, L'Hôpital returned to the court in September to oppose it. The Pope saw L'Hôpital as one of his chief opponents on the court. L'Hôpital for his part made it clear he would refuse to affix his seals to the alienation of church lands which would require war on heresy. In a fiery session of council L'Hôpital clashed with Lorraine on 19 September, arguing that this course of action would plunge France into civil war and overrun the land with reiters. He refused to affix his seal to any agreement that authorised this policy. Lorraine jabbed at L'Hôpital that he was a hypocrite and that his wife and daughter were both Protestants. L'Hôpital in turn shot back a sarcastic joke about Guisard corruption, enraging Lorraine who attempted to seize L'Hôpital's beard, before François de Montmorency stepped between the two men and attempted to calm the chamber. Lorraine was uninterested in his efforts and turned to Catherine, informing her that L'Hôpital was the chief cause of the kingdoms ills, and that if he was in the hands of the Parlement of Paris, he would be executed within 24 hours. L'Hôpital for his part explained that in fact Lorraine was the cause of the kingdoms ills, but it was apparent to him that he no longer had the power to change the direction of the crowns policy, and he left again shortly thereafter to his estates at Vignay near Étampes. A week later on 28 September L'Hôpital was obliged to yield the seals of his office, and he left for retirement. The crown meanwhile revoked the past toleration edicts, and issued the Edict of Saint-Maur, which outlawed Protestantism, steps L'Hôpital could not have taken.

On 7 October Jean de Morvillier received his seals. His dismissal as garde des sceaux elicited the rapturous excitement of radical preachers in Paris, Simon Vigor celebrated the news, denouncing L'Hôpital as the man who 'put the knife into the hands of our enemy'.

=== Writings ===
Severed from access to power, L'Hôpital turned his attentions to the production of 'discours', the arguments he put forward in these differed greatly from those he presented earlier in his career. No longer were Catholics to tolerate Protestants as an act of Christian clemency. Instead he argued that liberty of conscience was a natural right. He also abandoned his discussions of the two faiths being reunited, no longer viewing such a prospect as realistic, if he ever had.

=== Final years ===
The Parlement, well aware of L'Hôpital's disgrace, sought in 1571, for the seals of his office to be transferred to them, such that they could represent the king's will. While this would have been largely symbolic, Charles IX refused to provide them to the Parlement, conscious that allowing them to substitute themselves symbolically for the chancellor would be to acknowledge them as a legislative body. During marriage negotiations between the king's brother Alençon and Elizabeth I for a marriage that same year, L'Hôpital's advice was sought, and he suggested replacing Alençon, with the king's other brother Anjou. This concurred with the answer the crown wished to hear, however the negotiations did not achieve any more success.

In 1572 during the Massacre of Saint Bartholomew, Catherine dispatched an escort to his residence to ensure no harm befell him. This was just as well, as his death was desired by some of the participants. He died on his estates on 13 March 1573.

Throughout his life L'Hôpital had not accumulated significant wealth, making him atypical for the high robe nobility of his era. In his last will, he bequeathed his property to his only daughter, and assigned his wife as the administrator of his lands.

== See also ==
- Tribunal de commerce de Paris, founded by Michel de l'Hôpital in 1563

== Sources ==
- Baumgartner, Frederic (1988). Henry II: King of France 1547-1559. Duke University Press.
- Benedict, Philip (2003). Rouen during the Wars of Religion. Cambridge University Press.
- Carroll, Stuart (2005). Noble Power during the French Wars of Religion: The Guise Affinity and the Catholic Cause in Normandy. Cambridge University Press.
- Carroll, Stuart (2011). Martyrs and Murderers: The Guise Family and the Making of Europe. Oxford University Press.
- Chevallier, Pierre (1985). Henri III: Roi Shakespearien. Fayard.
- Cloulas, Ivan (1985). Henri II. Fayard.
- Diefendorf, Barbara (1991). Beneath the Cross: Catholics and Huguenots in Sixteenth Century Paris. Oxford University Press.
- Durot, Éric (2012). François de Lorraine, duc de Guise entre Dieu et le Roi. Classiques Garnier.
- Harding, Robert (1978). Anatomy of a Power Elite: the Provincial Governors in Early Modern France. Yale University Press.
- Holt, Mack P. (2005). The French Wars of Religion, 1562-1629. Cambridge University Press.
- Holt, Mack P. (2020). The Politics of Wine in Early Modern France: Religion and Popular Culture in Burgundy, 1477-1630. Cambridge University Press.
- Jouanna, Arlette (1998). Histoire et Dictionnaire des Guerres de Religion. Bouquins.
- Knecht, Robert (2010). The French Wars of Religion, 1559-1598. Routledge.
- Knecht, Robert (2014). Catherine de' Medici. Routledge.
- Knecht, Robert (2016). Hero or Tyrant? Henry III, King of France, 1574-1589. Routledge.
- Roberts, Penny (2013). Peace and Authority during the French Religious Wars c.1560-1600. Palgrave Macmillan.
- Roelker, Nancy (1968). Queen of Navarre: Jeanne d'Albret 1528-1572. Harvard University Press.
- Roelker, Nancy (1996). One King, One Faith: The Parlement of Paris and the Religious Reformation of the Sixteenth Century. University of California Press.
- Salmon, J.H.M (1975). Society in Crisis: France during the Sixteenth Century. Metheun & Co.
- Shimizu, J. (1970). Conflict of Loyalties: Politics and Religion in the Career of Gaspard de Coligny, Admiral of France, 1519–1572. Geneva: Librairie Droz.
- Sutherland, Nicola (1980). The Huguenot Struggle for Recognition. Yale University Press.
- Thompson, James (1909). The Wars of Religion in France 1559-1576: The Huguenots, Catherine de Medici and Philip II. Chicago University Press.
