= Edict of July =

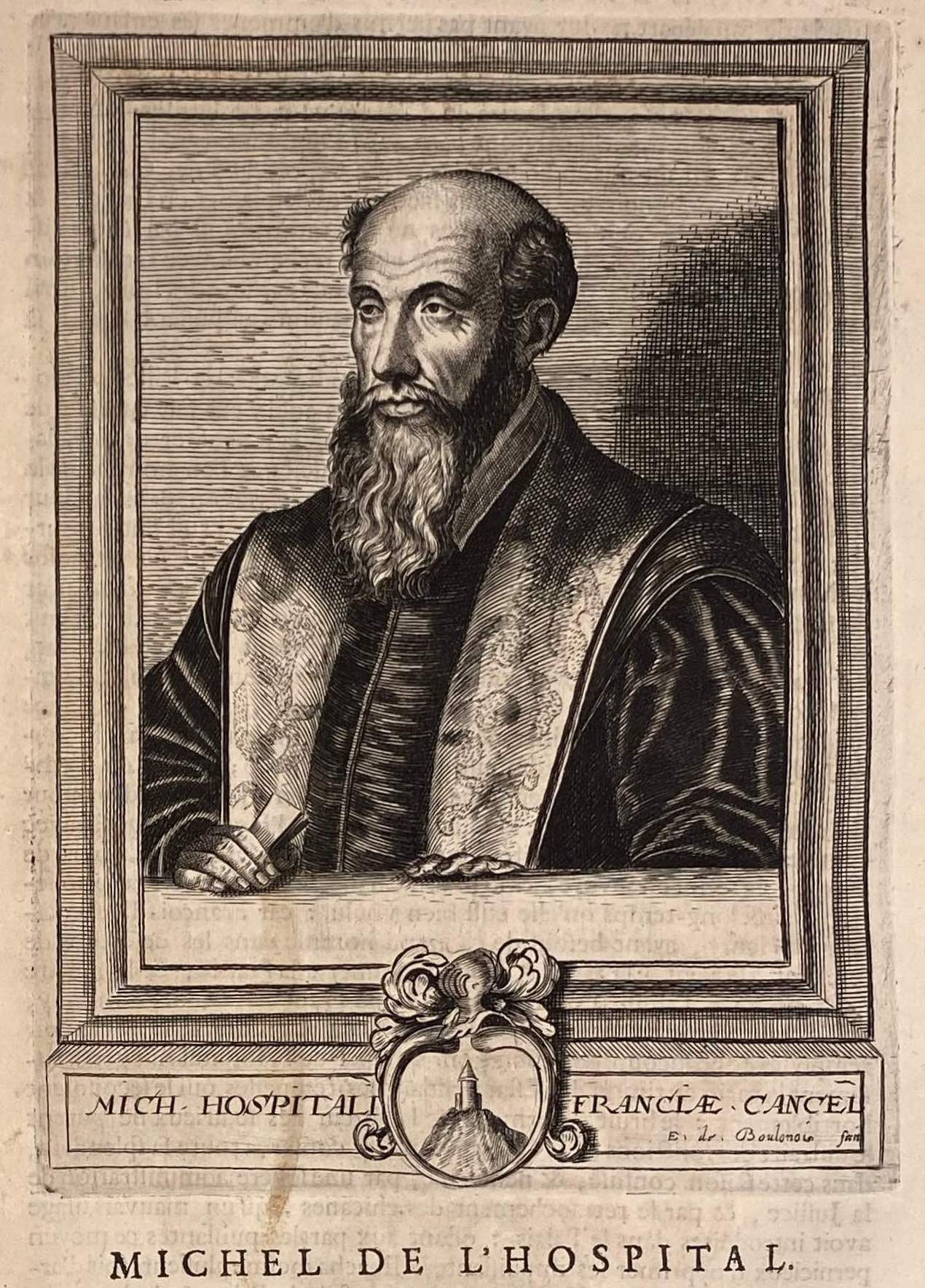
Chancellor of France Michel de l'Hôpital who oversaw the construction of the edict.

The Edict of July, also known as the first Edict of Saint-Germain, was a decree of limited tolerance promulgated by the regent of France, Catherine de' Medici, in July 1561. Whilst it emphasised a continued commitment to banning Huguenot worship in France, it granted pardon for all religious offenses since the reign of Henry II, who had died two years earlier, which was a victory for the Protestant community. A further Protestant victory was in the reaffirmation of the removal of the death penalty for heresy cases. The edict would be overtaken by events, and ultimately left unenforced as France moved first to the landmark Edict of Saint-Germain and then into the Wars of Religion.

== Legislative background ==
During the reign of Henry II, several attempts were made to suppress Protestantism, which had been growing in France whilst Henry was distracted by the Habsburg–Valois Wars. This manifested in the Edicts of Chateaubriand, Ecouen and Compiègne. The substance of these being to push France on a more Spanish approach to heresy, with the re-establishment of the Chambre Ardente and the sending out of special commissioners to tackle heresy cases. This program of repression was cut short with Henry's sudden early death during a joust in 1559. Whilst a similar policy was attempted under his sickly son François II this was abandoned by 1560, with the Edict of Amboise (1560) pardoning those convicted of heresy offenses, provided they returned to good Catholic lives and the Edict of Romorantin in May, which moved heresy cases to ecclesiastical courts, which couldn't give death penalties.

When François in turn died in December 1560 this program of liberalising was accelerated, as Catherine de' Medici, Gaspard II de Coligny and Michel de l'Hôpital took the reins of government for the young Charles IX. In the Edict of 19 April L'Hôpital outlawed the use of hostile religious epithets such as 'Papiste' and 'Huguenot.' He also limited the rights of investigators to search private property. Heretics in exile would be allowed to return if they lived as obedient Catholics, or to sell their property should they remain out of the country. The Parlement of Paris reacted incredulously to this law, attacking it first on procedural grounds, given it had been sent to the Bailli and Senechaussee courts, before moving onto substantive critiques, accusing the King of approving diversity of religion, acting contrary to previous edicts, and funding the enemies of France through allowing exiles to sell their property. The court remonstrated the King to this effect.

On June 11 the crown received a petition from Huguenots unsatisfied with the Edict of 19 April, asking for temples in which to worship. The petition stated that the libellous rumours about what Huguenots got up to in their secret services would dissipate if they could worship in public temples. At the same time the Parlement and the ultra grandees pressured for a retreat from the April 19 Edict. Catherine decided to host a pourparler to address this petition and policy more broadly.

== Tensions in France ==
Concurrently to the legislative efforts proposed by the crown and Parlement, the situation was deteriorating fast in the capital and the country more broadly. Beginning in 1557 popular religious violence was a feature of the capital with the attack on the service held in St Jacques after the loss at the battle of St. Quentin. This accelerated with the trial and execution of Anne du Bourg in 1559. This high profile execution of a Parlementaire precipitated the Saint Medard riot in December of that year and the assassination of President Minard. Continued clashes occurred at Popincourt in April 1561 around Lent. This was furthered in a scandalous discovery of Protestant services being held at the house of Michel Gaillard, with the duc de Longueville and Catherine de Medici's cousin in attendance. As this was happening at the same time as Hopital was legislating against house searches the two were interpreted to be connected by the Catholic population. Students assaulted the Gaillard house, as Protestant gentlemen rushed to his defence, leading to a two day riot. The Parlement ordered Gaillard to vacate Paris on April 28, on pain of being declared a rebel.

Meanwhile the situation in the broader country was also deteriorating, with churches being seized by the Protestants in their southern strongholds such as Millau and Montauban. It is in this context that the crown pushed towards more edicts on the matter of religion.

== The pourparler ==
The queen referred the petition she received first to the privy council, which suggested it was a matter for the Parlements to discuss. Yet the queen and her allies, conscious of the Parlement's conservativism, were unwilling to pursue this route, and decided instead to host a pourparler, to be attended by 150 grandees and magistrates of the realm. The pourparler would occur in twenty three sessions between 23 June and 17 July and was framed by Hopital not on grounds of religion but rather methods of pacifying the discord in France. Both Guise brothers were present and they argued in favour of the 'moderate conservative' position, no tolerance to Protestantism, but no return to the era of burnings with support for a national council to solve the churches ills. Admiral Coligny and the Chancellor meanwhile advocated that this was simply unworkable and proposed toleration as a temporary necessity at least. Tournon championed the old guard, though by this point he was very frail and senile, denouncing the idea of a national council.

Matters became heated between Coligny and Guise on the issue of tolerance, with the duke saying on the matter that he "would not keep his sword sheathed forever" if toleration was granted. Eventually it came down to a vote, with the decision to not offer tolerance but allow Protestants to sell their goods before leaving the kingdom winning by a majority of 3 votes. After the vote Catherine oversaw the burning of the anonymous ballots, so that no one might become compromised for the position they had taken.

== Terms of the edict ==
In its most fundamental aspect, the edict confirmed the ban on Protestant worship in France. However there were many moderate concessions made, such that the ultras were perceived to have lost the discussions.

Firstly corporal punishment was ended as a punishment for crimes of heresy. Both private and public religious meetings also remained banned on pain of confiscation of property. However in reinforcement of the edict of April 19, civilian subjects were prohibited from investigating what was going on in the house of a neighbour, a matter only for the police. The edict of Romorantin's removal of heresy as a crime only for the ecclesiastical courts was again endorsed. Whereas Romorantin had technically left the door open for the death penalty through case referral to the secular courts from the ecclesiastical for sentencing, this loophole was now ended. Banishment was to be the harshest punishment for heresy, and a false accuser was to receive the same punishment as would their target had they been guilty. Amnesty was granted for past religious offenses that were not armed and a ban on firearms in urban areas was established with a penalty of 50 crowns. Prohibition established on the carrying of daggers or swords unless the subject is a gentleman.

All terms of the edict were to be provisional, waiting for either a national council of the clergy or a general council of the church.

== Enforcement ==
The Parlement of Paris registered the edict of July provisionally, whilst reserving the right to remonstrate against it later, before turning their attention to what they felt was the far more egregious ordinance of Orléans. The edict would see only limited enforcement, whilst the courts would continue to abide by the lack of death sentences for heresy, the prohibited on possession of firearms and Protestant services proved far harder to enforce. This was partly due to local authorities who were unwilling or no longer able to act against such services, and partly a royal policy to allow such discreet worship, despite the terms of the edict. The royal governor of Paris Charles, Prince of La Roche-sur-Yon turned a deaf ear to complaints from Parlement about Protestant prêches occurring in and around the city. Matters would reach a head in December 1561, with Protestants and Catholics again clashing at rival services near Saint Medard, with two dying as a result. Demonstrating a failure of the edict to quell religious violence as it had intended.

In January 1562, the crown made the edict obsolete, and thus ended any enforcement of it, with the establishment of the edict of Saint-Germain.

== Subsequent events ==
With the passage of the edict of Saint-Germain, a more full recognition of a Huguenot presence in France was granted, and Huguenot worship legalised outside of the cities of the kingdom. The edict was much more vigorously opposed by the Parlements who held out on registration for over 30 days, and many Catholic grandees, and would ultimately hold for but a few months before the Duke of Guise would perpetrate the Massacre of Vassy bringing France towards a civil war. Over the following 30 years, there would be many edicts outlining different interpretations of the rights of the Huguenots in France, before finally the Edict of Nantes.

== See also ==
- Edict of Compiègne
- Edict of Saint-Germain
- French Wars of Religion
- Edict of Nantes
