= Crémieux =

Crémieux is a French surname. Notable people with the surname include:

- Adolphe Crémieux (1796–1880), French lawyer and statesman
- Daniel Crémieux (1938–2025), French fashion designer
- Fernand Crémieux (1857–1928), French lawyer and politician
- Hector-Jonathan Crémieux (1828–1893), French playwright and librettist
- Suzanne Crémieux (1895–1976), French politician

== Other people ==
- Jordan Lasker, American Internet personality writing under the pen name Crémieux Recueil
