= Daniel Cremieux =

French fashion designer (1938–2025)

Daniel Crémieux
- Born: 22 May 1938; Marseille, France
- Died: 12 September 2025 (aged 87); Aix-en-Provence, France
- Spouse: Genevieve (Gen) Crémieux
- Children: Stéphane Crémieux, Sophie Crémieux

Daniel Crémieux (22 May 1938 – 12 September 2025) was a French fashion designer best known for his preppy style clothing, mainly menswear. He launched his eponymous brand, Daniel Crémieux, in 1976 in France.

== Background ==
Born in Marseille on 22 May 1938, Daniel Crémieux went to London when he was seventeen to study English. Crémieux died at his home in Aix-en-Provence, on 12 September 2025, at the age of 87.

== Career ==
Crémieux's fondness for fashion started when he was very young. His father owned clothing stores in the south of France, and he was constantly surrounded by beautiful clothes.

At the age of seventeen, Daniel traveled to London to study English. During his time there, he became familiar with elements of British student style, including braces, badges, and checked knitwear commonly worn by university students. After returning to France, he brought back a Shetland sweater—then relatively uncommon in the country—which later informed his approach to developing a more refined interpretation of emerging preppy-inspired fashion.

He flew to New York City in late 1960s and fell more deeply in love with the preppy menswear of traditional brands. He returned to France with the desire to create the best French preppy brand available, a modern interpretation of this very traditional look.

In 1976, Crémieux launched his own brand, with an iconic golfer as its logo, and opened his first shop in Saint-Tropez, on the French Riviera between Nice and Marseille. This was the first store, soon to be followed by others in Paris and Aix-en-Provence.

Today, Crémieux is an international brand with shops in France, United Kingdom and United States.
