= Amboise conspiracy =

Failed Huguenot plot against King Frances II

Conspiracy of Amboise
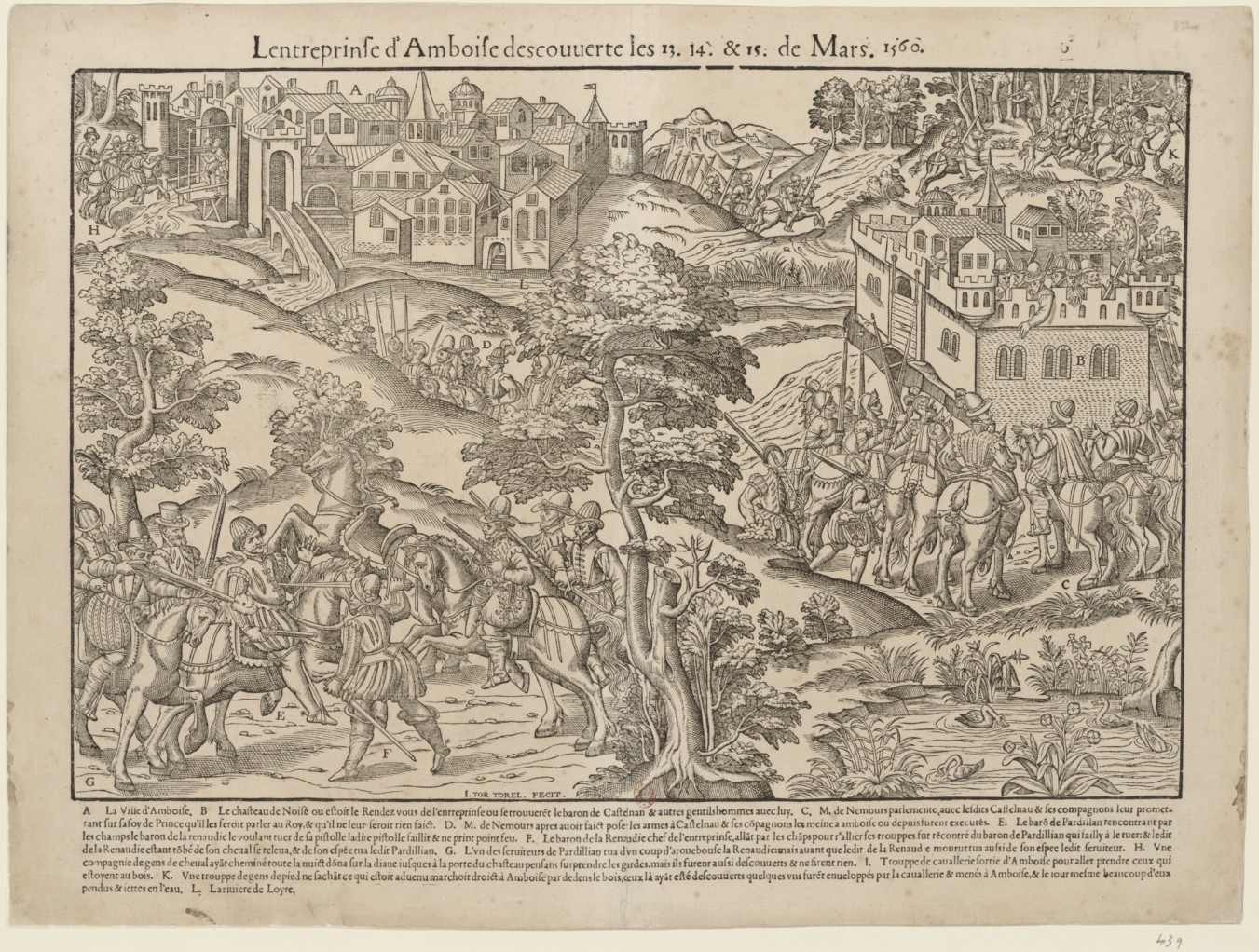
- Depiction of the conspiracy as it unfolded, by Jacque Tortorel and Jean Perrissin
- Date: March 1560
- Location: Château d'Amboise, Amboise, France
- Type: Political and religious plot
- Cause: Dissatisfaction with the Guise government
- Organised by: Jean du Barry, seigneur de la Renaudie †, Louis I, Prince of Condé
- Outcome: Conspiracy crushed
- Arrests: Hundreds
- Sentence: Capital punishment and amnesties

The Amboise conspiracy, also called Tumult of Amboise, was a failed attempt by a Huguenot faction in France to gain control over the young King Francis II and to reverse the policies of the current administration of François, Duke of Guise and Charles, Cardinal of Lorraine through their arrest, and potentially execution. It came to a head in 1560. Malcontent factions of Huguenots had been chafing under the French crown since the reign of Henry II and with the arrival of a new young king in 1559, saw their chance to take power for themselves. However the plot was uncovered ahead of time, and the Guise were ready for them. As such hundreds would be arrested, and many killed. Louis I, Prince of Condé was suspected of involvement, however he was able to flee south, and it was only after some months that the Guise were able to put him on trial. Shortly thereafter, the sickly Francis II died, their hold on the administration collapsed, and with it the conviction of Condé. This tumult would be one of the key steps in the collapse of crown authority that led to the first French War of Religion.

== Background ==
=== Death of the king ===
On 10 July 1559, after a jousting accident, Henry II of France died suddenly. Premature as his death was, the crown fell to his young son, Francis II, who was only 15 years old, but legally of age to rule. Francis' wife's maternal uncles, François, Duke of Guise and Charles, Cardinal of Lorraine moved into the power vacuum, taking control over the young and sickly king's administration. They were faced with a formidable crisis; France was 40 million livres in debt, of which 19 million was owed immediately as a result of the Italian Wars. Many royal officials had been without pay for years. Along with this fiscal crisis, the Guise administration was faced with a religious crisis. Despite the persecutions undertaken by Henry II, Protestantism had continued to grow towards the end of his reign, leaving to the new administration the crisis of solving the religious question.

=== Religious policy ===
To solve these twin problems, the Guise set upon a course of religious political continuity, and fiscal cost cutting. The former embodied in four laws in the latter half of 1559, with landlords to be prosecuted if they harboured heretics and meeting houses to be razed to the ground among other provisions. Raids were conducted of suspected Protestant homes, and in Paris these found pamphlets, lambasting the Guise. The trial of the Protestant judge Anne du Bourg which ended in his execution in December after he refused to recant, further fanned the flames of religious tension, which exploded in the capital with the Saint-Médard riot later that month and the assassination of President (of the Parlement) Minard. The backlash to these policies, and the increasing militancy of some Protestants troubled the Guise, who issued new laws, banning the wearing of masks, and long coats that might conceal pistols.

=== Financial policy ===
On the financial side the Guise made equally many enemies, the army was drastically scaled down in size, and payments to troops were deferred, upsetting many soldiers. Some came to the royal residence to voice their displeasure, and were threatened by Lorraine with hanging if they didn't vacate the premises. Further, many of the cuts to the administration and new taxes had notable exemptions for the lands of the Guise, and their clients, angering those elites, who were not among their circles. Crown lands were resumed, with the exception of Guises' holdings of Saumur, Provins and Dourdan further alienating those elites who had benefited from such crown grants. Finally venal office was suppressed, a move which inflamed the title holders who lost their privileges.

== Faction and conspiracy ==
=== Factions form ===
No sooner had Henry II died than malcontent factions began to form against the new Guise led government. Those opposed to the Guise sought for Antoine of Navarre to become regent of the kingdom, conscious of his flirtations with Protestantism in the late 1550s. This was despite Francis II being of legal age to rule. This faction further desired the calling of an Estates General, to solve many of what they perceived as the kingdom's ills in the past decades. The Guise's alienation of elements of the army through their fiscal policy furthered this disgruntled clique, bringing into their number Maligny and Castelnau among others.

=== Conspiracy established ===
Around August 1559 a plan began to consolidate for the coup plot, aiming at first to assert Navarre's right to a regency, and, when he proved uninterested, Condé's more dubious right as a minor prince of the blood. La Renaudie was tasked to lead this coup attempt. He had personal reasons to want to see the Guise taken from power, the Cardinal of Lorraine having had his brother-in-law executed. La Renaudie boasted that he had the support of John Calvin in Geneva and was given an angry reception when he visited the city hunting for recruits late in the year.

The large part of the ideological support base for the coup came from petit seigneurs such as de Mauvans and Protestant clerics, such as Antoine de la Roche Chandieu. Alongside military malcontents often from their retinues or clients, many poor soldiers were easily tempted by La Renaudie's offer of 10 sous for infantry and 18 sous for cavalry. The church of Provence was the only consistory to be fully onboard, the region, one of great Protestant strength, offering 2000 soldiers to the cause of the coup. Gaspard II de Coligny who had come to terms with the Guise recently was uninterested in involving himself, and did his best to persuade the Protestant nobility of Normandy in his powerbase to stay clear of involvement.

=== Final meeting ===
On 1 February the conspirators met in the forests near Nantes for a 'Parliament' during which the baron du Raunay offered his nearby château as a springboard for the operation and all participants swore an oath. The location was chosen to coincide with the meeting of the nearby Parlement, to explain the conspirators' presence in the area.

=== Conspiracy exposed ===
On 12 February, the court left the Château de Marchenoir, where Léonor d'Orléans, duc de Longueville had been entertaining the young Francis with hunting and other pursuits, and began the journey to Amboise. On the route they were overtaken by the Duke's secretary Millet, who had with him a lawyer named Pierre des Avenelles. Avenelles' Paris home had been made into a safe house for the plotters, and he claimed he had gotten uneasy with the conversations he was overhearing. The Guise were soon to give him a reward of 10,000 livres for the information he told them, which suggests other motives for his defection however. He elaborated on a conspiracy to arrest de Guise at Amboise, and to force the King to declare a liberty of conscience. He also knew the name of the leader of the conspiracy, La Renaudie.

Rumours had been swirling for some time that a plot was in the air, however now the Guise had concrete details. They had long suspected Condé of involvement in opposition plots, and he had already been passed over for the governorship of Picardy he had been promised in January. But Condé was cautious, and however greatly involved, he carefully left no written evidence, working instead through servants. Robert Stuart, who had been suspected of involvement in the assassination of President Minard, was brought to Amboise and tortured in the hope he knew the date of the operation. In preparation for the attack much of the high nobility was invited to Amboise, including Coligny and Condé on 21 February, and they duly arrived at the castle.

== Tumult ==
=== Pre-emptive strike ===
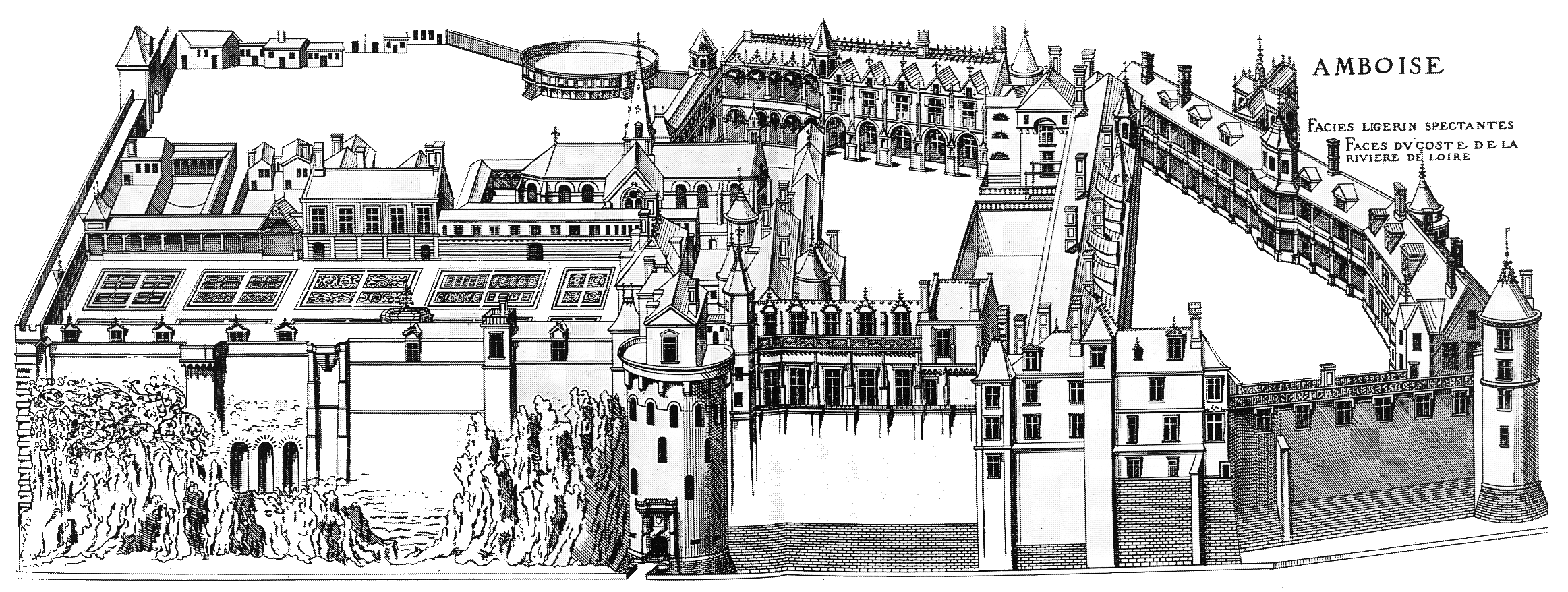
The Château d'Amboise at the time of the events.

The first action occurred on 11 March, when a group sent out from Amboise, under the count of Sancerre to Tours where they were able to pick up and arrest around ten of the plotters, including the baron de Castelnau and captain Mazères who were waiting for the delivery of money for the operation. A further 25 conspirators were picked up while they were walking outside the Château de Noizay a small distance from Amboise castle, and the whole group were taken in to the fortress. Most of the captured men would however be released, after a stern rebuke from Chancellor François Olivier, once it was determined they had largely joined the conspiracy over oaths of loyalty or lack of pay.

=== The main body ===
On the morning of 15 March, a new panic set in as 200 horsemen were sighted by boatman on the Loire, making their way down the Blois road to Amboise, wearing white sashes to symbolise their Protestant purity. A several hour fight began in the suburbs between these men and the defenders, ending in their scattering. Condé could do little but watch them flee from the battlements of the castle. In the aftermath of the battle, La Renaudie was hunted down in the woods, and killed, his corpse being taken back to Amboise for display. He would be hung from the gates with a placard which read "La Renaudie also known as la Forest, author of the conspiracy, chief and leader of the rebels."

=== Mopping up ===
It was now that a fanning out of arrest parties took place. Jacques d'Albon, Seigneur de Saint André was dispatched with 200 horsemen to Tours, Paul de Thermes was dispatched to Blois, François de Scépeaux to Orléans, and Louis, Duke of Montpensier to Angers. They conducted further arrests during the day, with some of their targets retreating into houses to continue fighting and having to be burned out. On 17 March, Francis II made the duke of Guise lieutenant-general of the kingdom, giving him overall authority of the military. He set about further refortifying Amboise, providing artillery to weak sections, and assigning princes and knights to each quarter of the castle. Further efforts to contain the situation were made. A general amnesty notice was issued for any rebels who returned to their homes within 24 hours; others would be proclaimed rebels, anyone would be allowed to kill them, and their property would be forfeit. Conscious of the confused composition of the insurrection, a provision allowing petitions from subjects if they came to the king 'loyally' was also granted.

Over the following days, work continued on the castle, and trenches around it were made. With the arrest parties mopping up stragglers, all relevant bailiffs and seneschals were granted authority to arrest those found in the countryside around Amboise.

== Aftermath ==
=== Immediate consequences ===
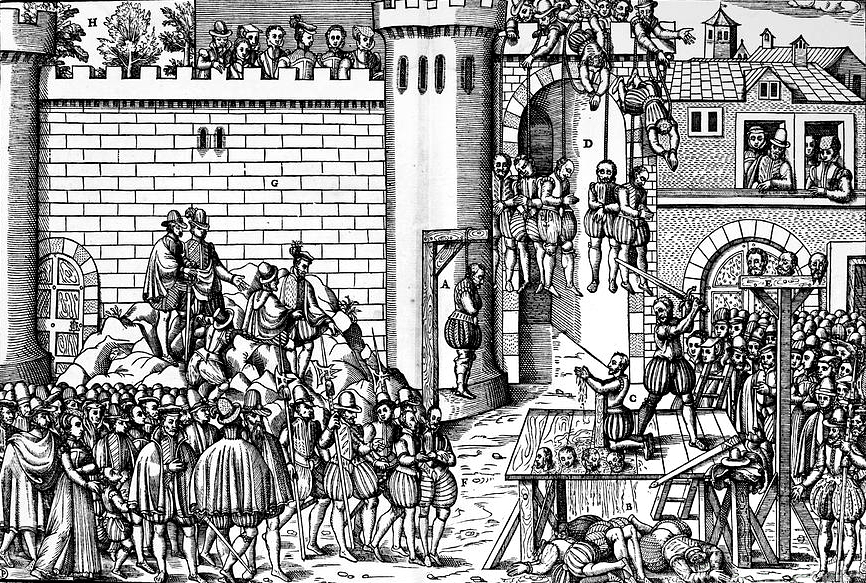
Contemporary woodcut of the executions at Amboise

With most of the conspiracy's leadership captured or killed in the field, the Guise set about interrogating the prisoners they had caught, and examining the papers they had captured from the various raided châteaux. The number of executions that followed has been reported to be as high as 1500, though this appears to be an exaggeration. What was more shocking to aristocratic contemporaries was the summary nature of the executions - even of men of 'good birth' - who were hanged or drowned in the Loire. The baron de Castelnau was executed, despite the promise of the gentleman who arrested him that if he came quietly he would not be killed. Guise's wife Anna d'Este pled for his life, but to no avail.

Eager to avoid suspicion, Condé did not immediately depart the scene, and stayed at Amboise, angrily denouncing those who were now murmuring of his involvement as 'scum.' Once the court had moved off to the Queen Mother's residence at Chenonceau, he went further, calling his questioners liars - a cutting rebuke in aristocratic circles - and challenged anyone who would openly accuse him to fight him in single combat. The duke of Guise, aware that for the moment he lacked proof, consoled Condé that he had no suspicions, and in an audience with the King and Queen Mother they accepted his denials, although Lorraine could not help but avoid eye contact. Taking advantage of Condé's absence at the King's lever on April 18, his apartments were raided on the orders of Catherine de' Medici; however, nothing was found. A few days later, Condé decided that things had finally gone too far, and slipped down south to Bordeaux and the relative safety of his brother's household.

=== Edict of Amboise ===
Despite their victory over the rebellion, the Guise were conscious that the religious policy of recent years had decidedly failed, and they sought to take a different path. The general pardon established during the conspiracy itself made a distinction between those of religious motivation and those of political motivation, with the former to be tolerated as long as they lived in obedience to the King, and the latter to be treated as enemies of the state. This represented a sharp contrast from recent policy. This trend would be continued in the Edict of Amboise, which pardoned those convicted of heresy offences as long as they lived as good Catholics from then on. A further shift came next month with the Edict of Romorantin, which transferred heresy cases to ecclesiastical courts that lacked the authority to give the death penalty, effectively ending capital punishment for heresy in France.

=== Lyon and disorder in the south ===
The rebellion may have been crushed in Amboise, but the situation was deteriorating in the provinces. Troops raised for the conspiracy in Dauphiné, Provence, and the Lyonnais were left without central direction, creating the nucleus of guerrilla armies instead. In Montauban, several churches were seized and modified in a Calvinist manner. Meanwhile, an attempt by the governor of Rouen to crack down on Protestants in his city resulted in a riot against him.

It was in Lyon where the most serious element of the conspiracy outside Paris would occur. On September 7, 1560, 3 days after the discovery of a stockpile of weapons had been found in a leading Protestant church member's house, Pierre Menard would be arrested. The house was full of Protestant soldiers who fought their way out of the building before fleeing the town. Menard explained to his captors that Amboise had been part of a wider conspiracy, which was to have involved the capture of Lyon for the Protestants, and that leading Geneva clergy — including John Calvin — were involved. John Calvin's letters to Maligny in Lyon confirmed Menard's testimony; Calvin referred to Maligny as "our hotspur."

The narrow foiling of this Lyon plot further angered Guise and Lorraine, who had suspected Condé and Navarre's involvement in the affair — a matter seemingly confirmed when an agent sent by Condé was captured with papers implicating him. They called an Assembly of Notables to discuss reforms for the kingdom, and agreed upon a package to present to a planned Estates General. Only Condé and Navarre were absent, being too fearful of arrest. To further isolate the renegade princes, two super-governorships were created for the kingdom, with one given to Charles, Prince of La Roche-sur-Yon and the other to Louis, Duke of Montpensier, thus separating them from their cousins.

=== Arrest, trial and release of Condé ===
No longer able to tolerate this treason, Condé was summoned to join the soon to be convened Estates General of 1560-1561. Thoroughly outnumbered by the troops under the Guises and Philip II, they had little choice but to attend. Upon arrival, Condé was arrested on October 31, along with the Vidame of Chartres. Condé filibustered the proceedings, demanding a trial of his peers, and not recognising the authority of his judges. Eventually, though, the trial would proceed, and he would be found guilty, with an indeterminate sentence, likely at the Château de Loches. However, his imprisonment was to be short. Not long after, Francis II, who had always been of fragile health, suffered an ear infection brought about by the cold, and he died on December 5, 1560. This spelled the end for the Guise administration. Soon a regency was arranged for the young Charles IX under Catherine de' Medici. She negotiated Navarre out of his position as regent (the usual prerogative as first prince of the blood) with the leverage of offering the release of the arrested Condé. Subsequently he was released on 20 December.
