= Trial and execution of Anne du Bourg =

Religious conflict in France

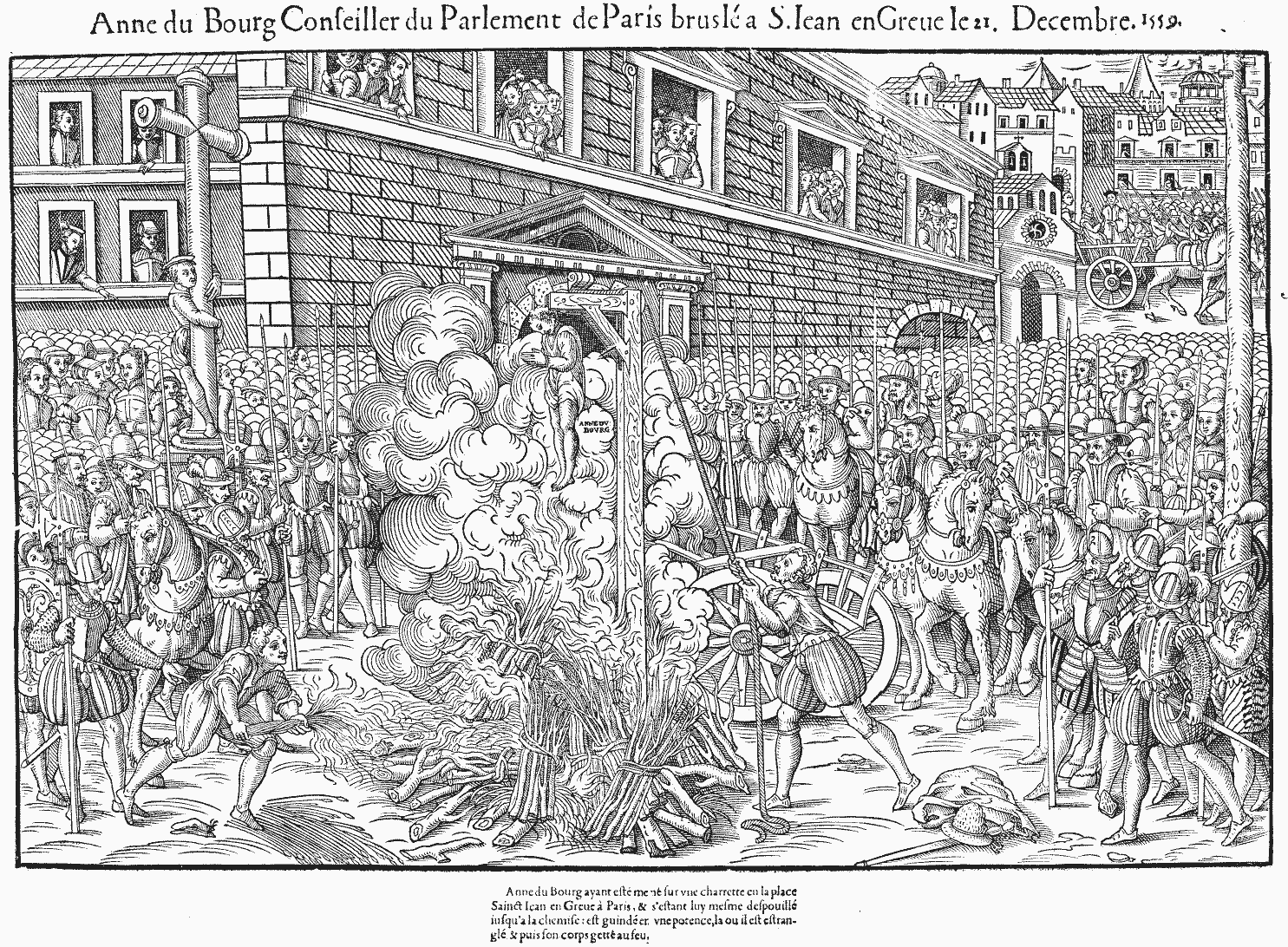
Anne du Bourg being burned at the stake

The trial and execution of Anne du Bourg was a critical event in the history of religious conflict in Paris, prior to the outbreak of the French Wars of Religion three years later. Anne du Bourg, a judge in the Parlement of Paris, would be executed, after calling King Henry II an adulterer and blasphemer, and refusing to affirm the Real presence. He would be garrotted and burned on 23 December 1559. Several of his colleagues who had been arrested along with him, would be forced to recant their beliefs before returning to re-join the court. His trial would inflame religious tensions in Paris, leading directly to the assassination of President Minard, and contributing to the powder keg that exploded in the riot of Saint Medard a few months later.

== Background ==
=== Royal policy ===
Beginning in the reign of François I, Protestantism would be subject to organised persecution in France. This would continue into the reign of his son Henri II, notably in the Edict of Compiègne (1557) and the Edict of Ecouen (1559). Despite these efforts, Protestantism would continue to grow stronger, from two churches in 1555, to a national synod in 1559 with around 1.5 million adherents. Heretic hunting by the Paris Parlement had slackened by the mid-1550s, with no one executed for heresy in 1555, with an attempt on the King's life in 1557, new legislation to push the Parlement's to action was introduced. However, Henri II remained unsatisfied with their progress, and their reticence to register the Edict of Ecouen into law, but was not able to push them into more aggressive action, until the conclusion of peace with the Habsburgs and English in the Treaty of Cateau-Cambrésis.

=== Popular action ===
Hostility in the city of Paris to the Huguenots exploded after the royal loss at the Battle of St. Quentin (1557), for which they were blamed by popular preachers. Shortly thereafter an angry crowd surrounded a secret Protestant site of worship on the rue St Jacques, threatening and throwing stones at those who tried to leave. Over one hundred would be arrested by the Parisian authorities following this, with 8 executed. It was into this volatile environment that Henri would attend a mercurial session of Parlement.

=== The judiciary ===
While the judiciary largely resisted the Protestant reformation, and remained overwhelmingly Catholic, the Paris judiciary was largely of the moderate Erasmian Catholic variety, which disapproved of burning people solely for privately held views and who were hostile to what they felt was Papal interference in France's religious affairs. This wing of the court was led by Presidents Seguier, de Hurley and de Thou. There was regardless an ultra Catholic wing of the court, led by Presidents Le Maistre, and Minard. There were however several Protestant justices among the Paris judiciary, including Louis du Faur and Anne du Bourg.

== The visit of the King ==
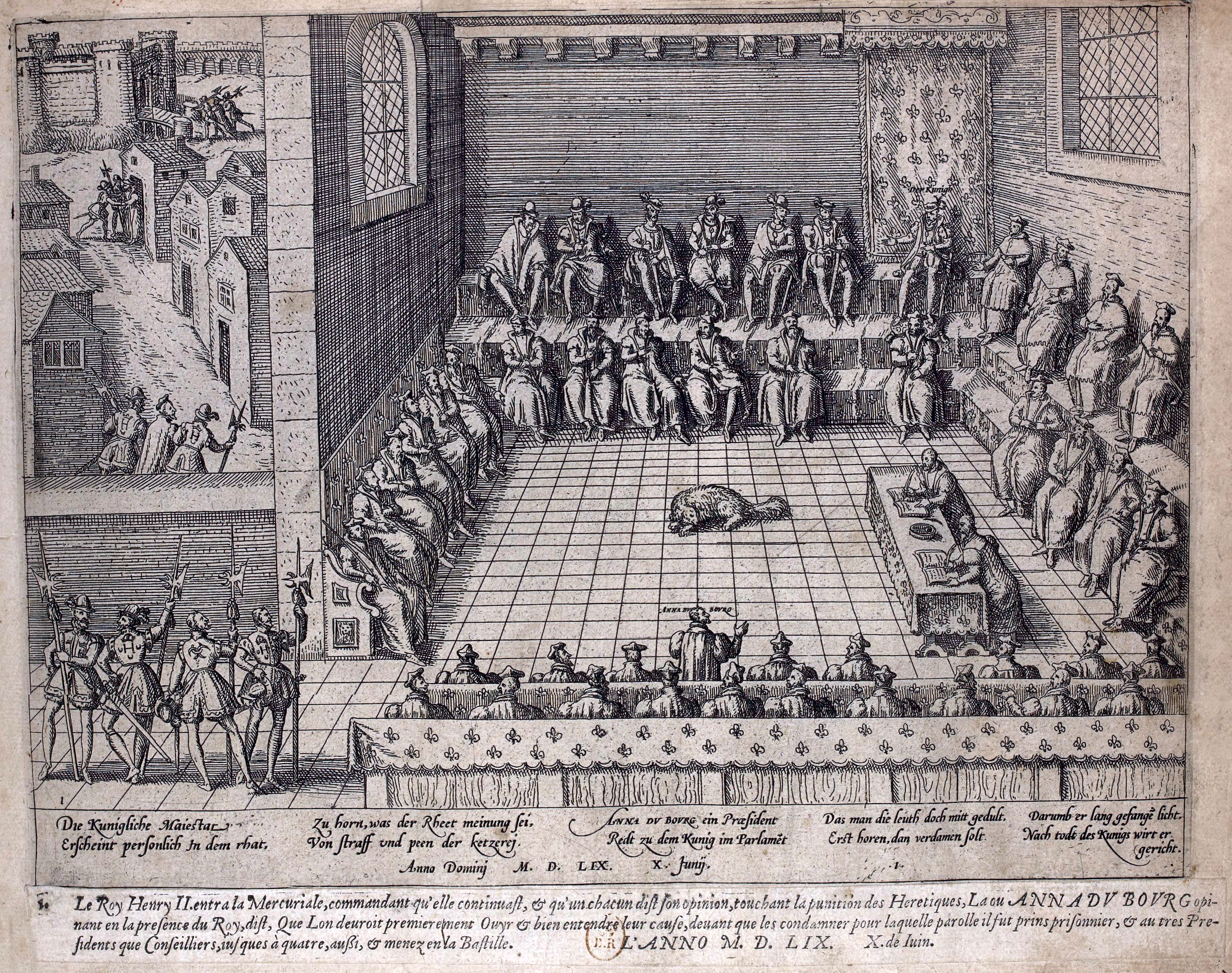
Henri II visits the Mercurial session, engraving by Frans Hogenberg

=== Prelude ===
Matters between the ultras and the moderates in Parlement came to a head in March 1559, when three prisoners appealed their death sentences in the Tournelles having been accused of heresy. The judges, more liberal by disposition were ill inclined to sentence the prisoners to death, and offered them amnesty in return for their recanting. The prisoners refused to recant, frustrating the judges, who proceeded to ask for an explanation in writing. This done they reduced their sentences to banishment. The direction the Tournelle was taking under the liberal judges frustrated the ultra wing of the court, who controlled the Grand Chambre. The gens du roi convened a mercuriale session in the hope of restoring discipline among the judges, and healing any potential breach that might be forming. The first session of the mercuriale was in the last week of April. The court began to reach a consensus in favour of the moderate faction in its first few sessions, favouring leaving heresy as a problem for a church council. Fumée went further, and argued for a suspension of the death penalty for heresy until such time as religious clarity achieved. This frightened the ultra wing of the court under Presidents Le Maistre, Saint-Andre and Minard. They went to the King, urging him to surprise the court during a later mercurial session and to verify what they said about the 'many Lutheran' members of the court.

=== The day of the visit ===
On 10 June, Henry II attended a session of the Parlement, accompanied by François, Duke of Guise, Charles, Cardinal of Lorraine, Louis, Duke of Montpensier and Anne de Montmorency. Alongside his grievances at the failure to register his edict, he had also been passed a list of suspect Huguenot judges by the informers among the judiciary. The King interrupted the deliberations of Parlement that were ongoing, expressing his dissatisfaction at how they were pursuing heresy before instructing them to continue their discussion. Viole then stood to advocate for submitting heresy to a church council. Le Maistre and only 14 other judges rose to advocate for the death sentence. Several councillors went further in favour of Protestantism, with Louis du Faur going as far as to attack the King directly through the use of scripture in quoting Elijah's words to King Ahab. Whilst Anne du Bourg took a more personal line, contrasting the widespread prosperous condition of blasphemers and adulterers, with the pure community of reformers, who desired only to cleanse the church. After the conseillers had spoken, it was the turn of the Presidents; de Hurley, and Seguier offered a defence of the courts conduct, and thus implicitly the moderates, Minard meanwhile emphasised that royal edicts such as those on heresy should be obeyed. Le Maistre went furthest, praising Philip II for his extermination of the Cathars, with the implicit comparison that Henry should do likewise for Protestants. The King still enraged by the words of du Bourg and du Faur demanded the Parlement register be surrendered to him before storming out. He was a serial adulterer himself, and thus interpreted du Bourg's comments as an indirect attack, and thus Lèse-majesté. He would be arrested, alongside du Faur, Fumée, de Foix and de la Porte, whilst Viole, du Ferrier and du Val would escape arrest by hiding with sympathetic colleagues until the crisis had passed.

== Trial and bargaining ==
=== Trial of the others ===
Du Bourg and the other judges would be housed in the Bastille, with a special commission established to try them on 19 June. In theory Parlementaires could only be tried by the whole body of their colleagues, but this was ignored. Two of the justices assigned to try the Parlementaires were former Chambre Ardente judges, Saint-Andre and Guyent. Also judging would be de Mesmes and the bishop of Paris Jean du Bellay. The King vowed to see du Bourg burn with his own eyes, however he would be killed at a joust celebrating the peace of Cateau-Cambrésis on July 10, succeeded by his young son Francis II who was governed by his maternal uncles, the Guise. Du Faur's crime was the second most serious, and as such he would be given the strictest non death sentence of the defendants, a fine and a 5-year suspension, as the Parlement was not enthusiastic to put any of its own to death. None of the other defendants wanted to fight on religious grounds, and they chose to challenge the authority of their judges to try them legally. De la Porte would be punished only in having to retract his comments about the severity of the Grand Chambre. Fumée appealed to Charles, Cardinal of Lorraine for clemency. De Foix found his trial complicated by the fact he'd distinguished Sacramentarians from Lutherans in terms of who should receive the death penalty. De Thou intervened on his behalf and he was obliged to renounce this view before the whole court and he was also suspended for a year though this was annulled.

=== Trial of du Bourg ===
The trial of Anne du Bourg gripped Paris, as he alone broke against outward conformity, in admitting to attending services and denying the miracle of mass when pressed by his judges. Efforts continued into December to avoid the scandal of a public execution, a compromise confession of faith being drawn up for him to sign, which on December 13 he did. The execution would not however be averted, as on December 19, fearing he had become a Nicodemite, he repudiated his signature. Despite the pleas of Margaret of Valois, Duchess of Berry and Frederick III, Elector Palatine his execution would go ahead.

== The assassination of President Minard ==
Whilst du Bourg languished in prison, his coreligionists were active in achieving revenge on the outside. In both October and December there would be failed attempts to jail break du Bourg. On December 12, ten masked horsemen gunned down the ultra judge, President Minard. outside his home. On the same day they also killed the informer of Henry II, Julian Fermé. The gates to Paris were quickly closed, while house to house searches could be conducted. Robert Stuart was determined as a suspect, and he was charged with the assassination of Minard, a plot to free du Bourg from prison and a plot to burn down Paris, though he confessed nothing under torture.

== Execution ==
To avoid any escape on the day of the execution, guards would be added around du Bourg, as he was transferred to the Place de Greve on December 23. However they would end up being used more to keep the Catholic crowd back from seizing him themselves, than they would be blocking any such attempts. As had become the custom Anne du Bourg was garroted before being burned, as the Parlement felt burning alive was too cruel a punishment. The Cardinal of Lorraine wrote to the French ambassador in Rome of his hope that this execution would act as a deterrent against Protestantism, yet for the Protestants he would be a prime martyr justifying resistance.

== Aftermath ==
Sectarian violence in Paris, that first exploded as a result of du Bourg's execution in a major way with the Saint Medard riot, would only increase over the following years in Paris as the situation deteriorated. This would culminate in the St. Bartholomew's Day massacre in which over 3000 Protestants would be killed.
