= Edict of Châteaubriant =

1551 French decree regulating censorship and other acts to the persecution of Protestants

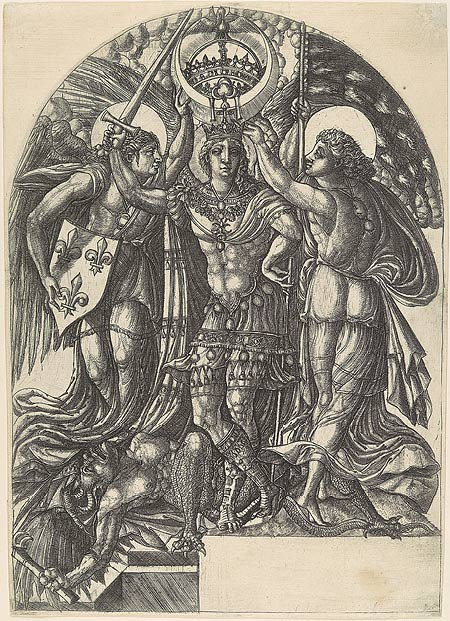
Catholic Valois propaganda: a haloed Henri II, attended by France and crowned by Fame, effortlessly tramples Heresy under foot in this engraving by Jean Duvet, ca. 1548

The Edict of Châteaubriant, issued from the seat of Anne, duc de Montmorency in Brittany, was promulgated by Henri II of France, 27 June 1551. The Edict was one of an increasingly severe series of measures taken by Henry II against Protestants, whom he regarded as heretics. In the preamble, the Edict frankly reported that previous measures against heresy in the kingdom had proved ineffectual. "Heretics", the Edict reported, met in conventicles, infected schools, invaded the judicial bench and forced toleration upon judges. To ensure more rigorous judgements, in 1547 Henri had already created a special judicial chamber drawn from members of the parlements, solely to judge cases of heresy (called by Protestants the Chambre Ardente (the "Burning Chamber"). The Edict contained quite detailed provisions: it called upon the civil and ecclesiastical courts to detect and punish all heretics, and placed severe restrictions on Protestants, including loss of one-third of property granted to informers, who were also granted immunity and confiscations of property both moveable and immovable belonging to those who had fled to Geneva, with whom the king's subjects were forbidden to correspond or to send money. Fourteen of its forty-six articles were concerned with censorship; its terms strictly regulated the press by prohibiting the sale, importation or printing of any book unapproved by the Faculty of Theology at the University of Paris, then or, now it was implied, in the future. Booksellers were to display a copy of the Faculty's printed list of prohibited books alongside a list of books for sale. Delegates of the Faculty were to make visits twice a year to each bookseller to ensure that the provisions were complied with. Since 1542 it had been a requirement that any shipment of books into France be opened and unpacked in the presence of delegates from the Faculty of Theology, which now, according to Roger Doucet, "assumed the intellectual direction of the kingdom."

Though the Edict went so far as to forbid the discussion of religious topics at work, in the fields, or over meals, it proved insufficient to stem the rising tide of reform in religion. Sterner measures would be taken in the next edict of the series, the Edict of Compiègne, 1557, which applied the death penalty for all convictions of heresy.

== See also ==
- Index Librorum Prohibitorum
