= Edict of Saint-Maur =

1568 religious edict

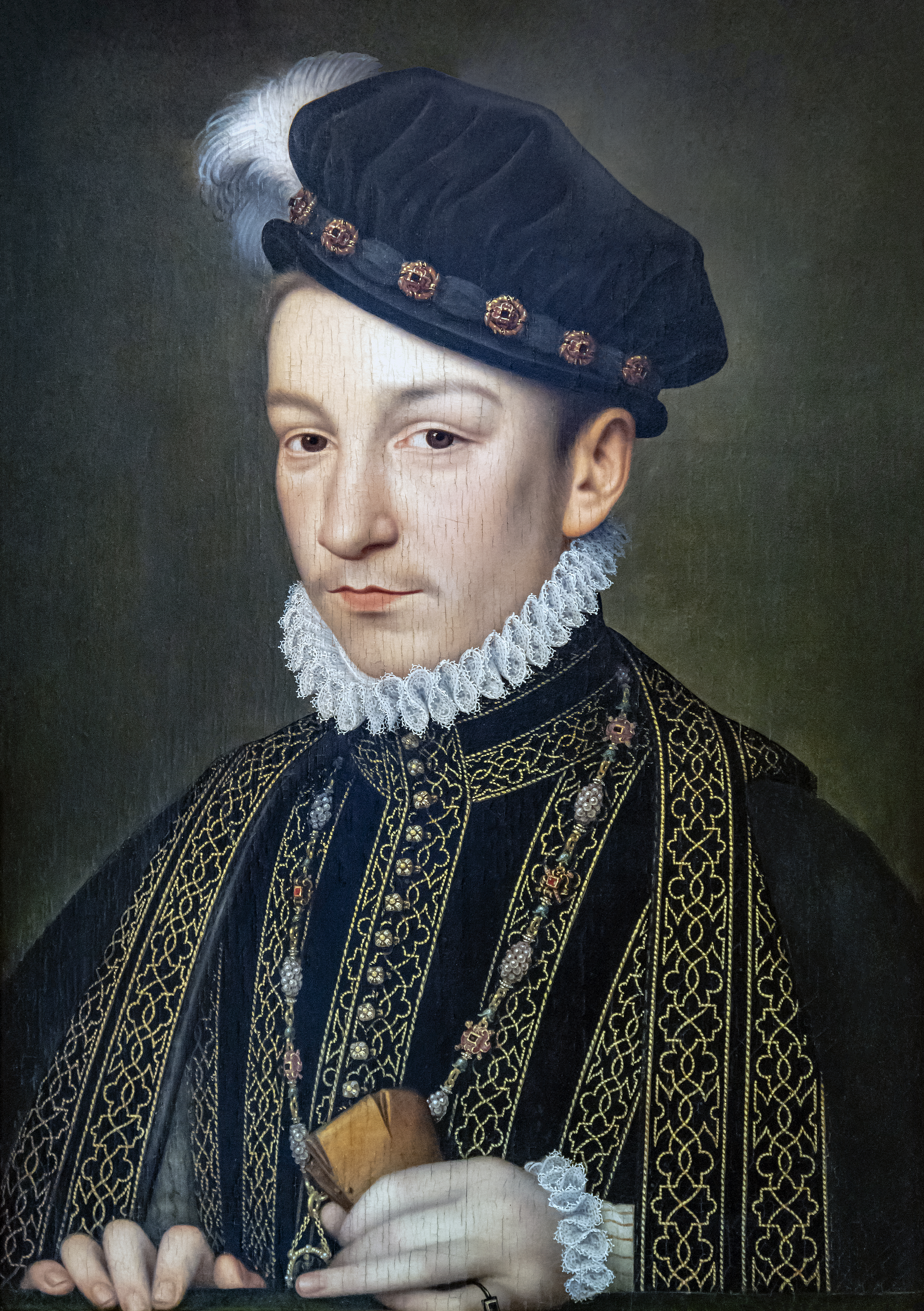
Portrait of Charles IX of France, who issued the Edict, by François Clouet

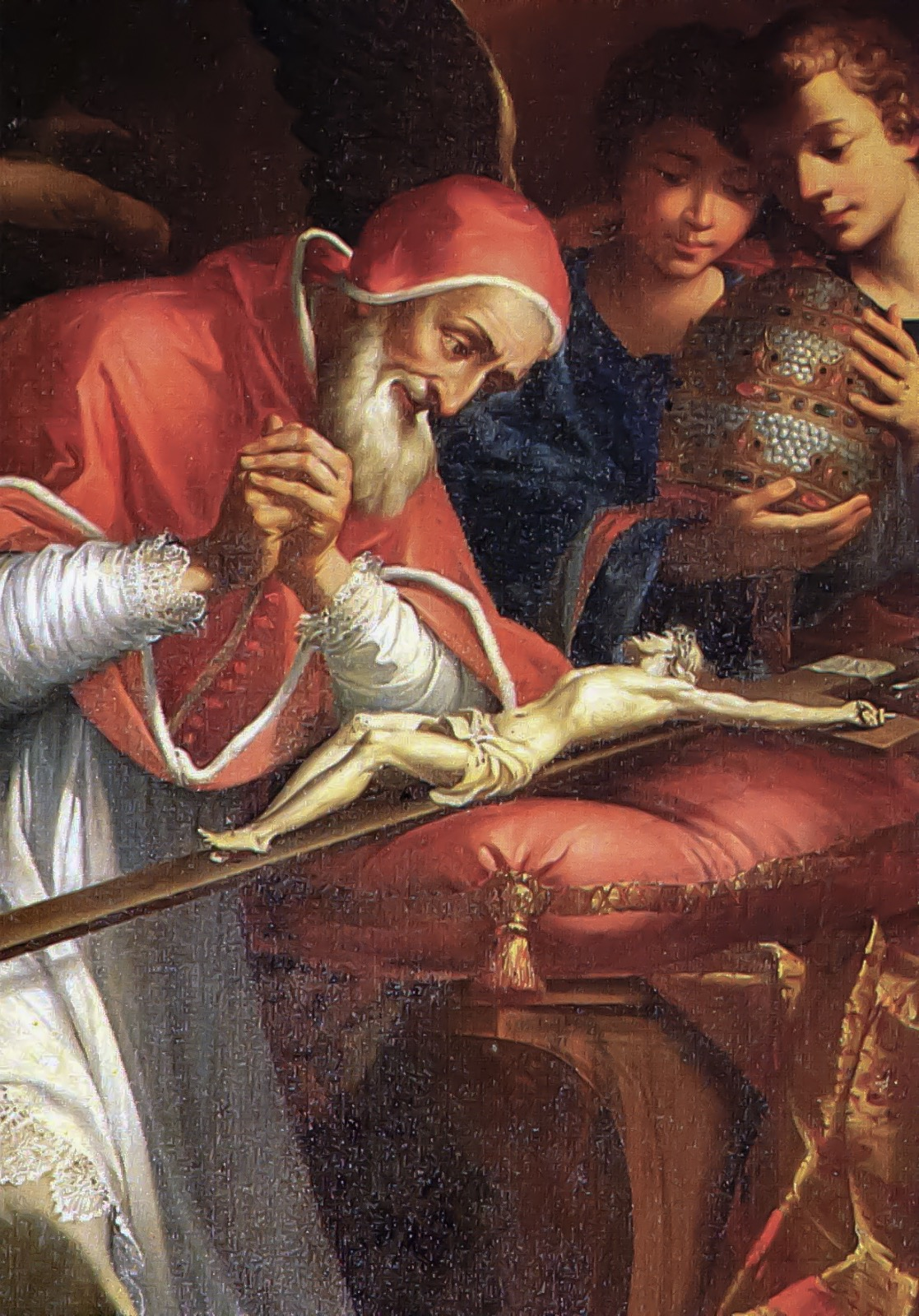
Portrait of Pope Pius V who negotiated the treaty as a concession for financial relief

The Edict of Saint-Maur was a prohibitive religious edict, promulgated by Charles IX of France at the outbreak of the third war of religion. The edict revoked the tolerance that had been granted to Protestantism, in the edicts of Saint-Germain, Amboise and the peace of Longjumeau. The edict forbade the exercise of any religion other than Catholicism in the kingdom of France, and gave Protestants 15 days to vacate the kingdom. Ultimately the edict would be overturned in the landmark peace of Saint-Germain-en-Laye at the end of the third religious war in 1570 which restored recognition to Protestantism, alongside many other concessions.

== Short peace ==
=== Triumph of the hardliners ===
With Longjumeau signed the balance on the privy council was already shifting towards the uncompromising Catholics. Catherine de' Medici's Italian favourites began to voice their positions, which tended to be anti-toleration and anti-peace. Concurrently, the hardliner Cardinal of Lorraine, who had been absent from the court, both due to the war and a lack of favour, returned, and the duke of Anjou, heir to the throne, fell under his influence. With the return of his enemy Lorraine, and conscious his conciliatory response to the Surprise of Meaux had lost him Catherine's favour, the Chancellor Michel de l'Hôpital withdrew from attending court in June. This lost the moderates their key voice on the court.

=== Financial trouble ===
Though the costly war was over, the crown remained hard pressed financially, and desired to alienate church lands to cover shortfalls. The Pope was open to this, on certain conditions. On 1 August, Pope Pius V offered the alienation of 850,000 livres of church land, but only on the condition that the funds be used to suppress heresy in France. Much of the council was eager to accept such terms, as an opportunity to overturn what they characterised as a mistaken peace back in March.

=== Protestant actions ===
Despite Longjumeau's prohibitions on the formation of foreign alliances by crown subjects, the aristocratic Huguenots had busied themselves aligning with the Dutch Protestant rebels. In August they formed a formal alliance, vowing to aid each other in the ridding of their respective kings' 'evil councillors.' Fernando Álvarez de Toledo, 3rd Duke of Alba, the Spanish military authority in the Spanish Netherlands was furious, and complained to Charles IX, who was able to do little more than excuse himself as unable to control his subjects. In early September the leading aristocratic Huguenots were warned of a plot to arrest them by Gaspard de Saulx, who while hostile to them felt the plan dishonourable. As such they fled south, to their stronghold of La Rochelle on the west coast of France.

== Prelude to edict ==
=== Council meeting ===
Hôpital made his final return to council, on 19 September, so he could oppose the acceptance of Pius V's terms. He argued before Catherine that to accept such a deal would be to surrender traditional Gallican liberties and that the king had the right to seize church lands without the consultation of the Pope. Lorraine rebuked him, calling Hôpital a hypocrite with his wife and daughter being Calvinists. He said further that Hôpital would not be the first of his name that had desired evil of the king. Lorraine then assaulted the chancellor, grabbing at his beard, before the two could be separated by Marshal Montmorency. Lorraine then appealed to Catherine, noting that if Hôpital was in the hands of the Parlements 'his head would not rest on his shoulders 24 hours.' Hôpital retorted that it was actually Lorraine who was an evil presence in the king's advisory council. However Hôpital had lost the argument, and the king decided to agree to Pius' terms.

=== New chancellor ===
Hôpital withdrew to his estates at Vigny, and asked to be relieved of his office, conscious that he no longer had any influence on the council. A few days later on 2 October, the secretary Brûlart would arrive, to pick up his Chancellor's seals, and give them to René de Birague who could apply them as was required to the edict of Saint-Maur. Birague sealed the edict, and revoked the edicts of Saint Germain, Amboise and Longjumeau.

== Terms of Saint-Maur ==
=== Preamble ===
The edict began with a hard-line interpretation of the previous seven years, beginning with the Edict of July and recounting the various efforts to solve the religious question, and how these had all been sabotaged by the Protestants. It highlighted the failure of the Protestants to return La Rochelle, Castres and Montauban despite the edict of Longjumeau's terms. The edict went on to say that the Protestants 'abuse our clemency' and accused them of plotting against the kingdom.

=== Terms ===
Once this preamble was complete the edict moved on to terms, men of any stature and office were forbidden from practicing any other religion than Catholicism. Protestant preachers were to vacate the kingdom within 15 days of publication. Despite these terms however, the common people would not be examined as to their consciences on matters of faith. Instead, it was hoped that bishops and pastors would bring subjects with Protestant consciences back in to the religious fold.

All towns held by Protestants must be returned, private quarrels were to cease, and all those currently illegally under arms would have to lay them down within 20 days.

== Civil war and revocation ==
=== Establishment ===
Having decreed this edict on 28 September, a subsequent edict was established the same day, depriving all Protestant magistrates and office holders of their respective offices, though with an allowance for compensation for this financial loss, if the office holder was not currently in open rebellion. Charles, wearing his state robes, took the edict personally to the Parlement of Paris for publication, which the Parlement, in contrast to previous toleration edicts, was keen to do. Whilst in the Parlement building he oversaw the burning of the previous edicts that were to be revoked, throwing them into the fire.

Copies of the edict would be put into international circulation, and sent to the Catholic princes of western Europe. Explaining that the prior edicts that had so concerned them, had just been methods of coaxing the Protestants back into the Catholic fold.

=== Civil war ===
The edict proved more theoretical than practical, as civil war immediately followed. The Protestants who had fled to La Rochelle had, by the time of Saint-Maur, already taken up arms to defend themselves. The duke of Anjou took the field on 6 October. The Protestant forces under Condé were reinforced by mercenaries from Germany, and began laying siege to southern cities. In a rear-guard action in March 1569 at Jarnac Condé was captured and killed, leaving the Huguenot army under the command of Gaspard II de Coligny. He brought the Huguenots to victory at the battle of La Roche-l'Abeille before being crushingly defeated later that year at the Battle of Moncontour. The Huguenots would not however be defeated, and he unified his forces with those under Gabriel de Lorges, Count of Montgomery and went on a campaign of pillage.

=== Peace and revocation ===
The crown was by this point so overburdened with debt it was forced to compromise in the peace of Saint-Germain, in which the edict of Saint-Maur was revoked, Protestants were restored in their ability to worship in designated places, Coligny and other Protestant nobles were restored to office, and four surety towns were granted to Protestant control.

=== Edicts burden ===
Given this civil war, the towns of Castres, Montauban and La Rochelle would not be returned to the crown, two of these towns would be legally granted to the Protestants as their surety in the peace that superseded the edict. Further during the war towns such as Nîmes would be added to Protestant control again. As for the other terms of the edict, the Protestants had been preparing for civil war again before it broke out; as such, the loss of office and title did not affect much as most Protestant nobles were already south with Condé in rebellion.
