= Peace of Saint-Germain-en-Laye =

1570 treaty between France and the Huguenots

Treaty of Saint-Germain-en-Laye
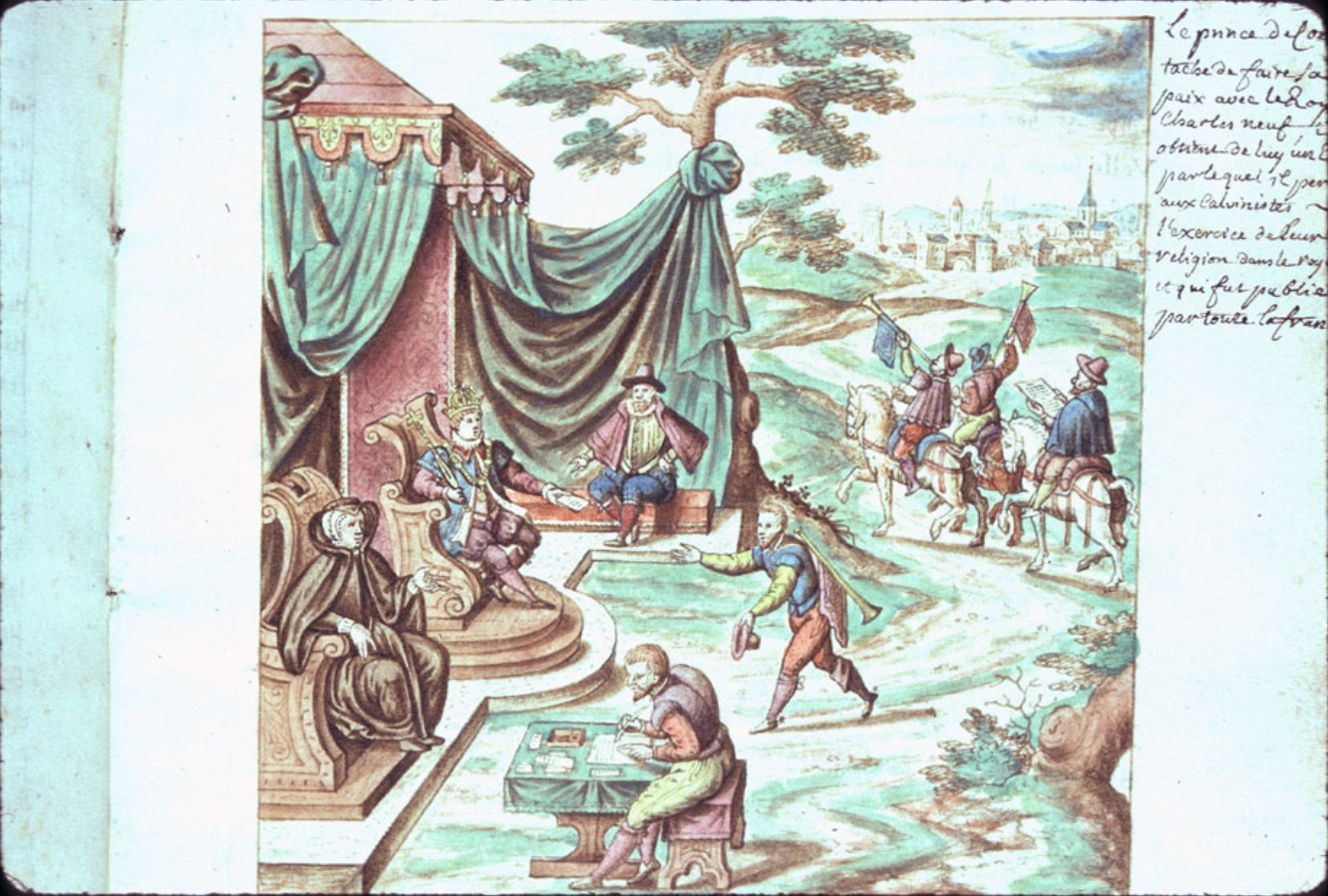
- Picture of Catherine de'Medici and Charles IX signing the peace
- Signed: 8 August 1570
- Location: Saint-Germain-en-Laye
- Signatories: Charles IX of France; Gaspard II de Coligny; Jeanne d'Albret
- Languages: French

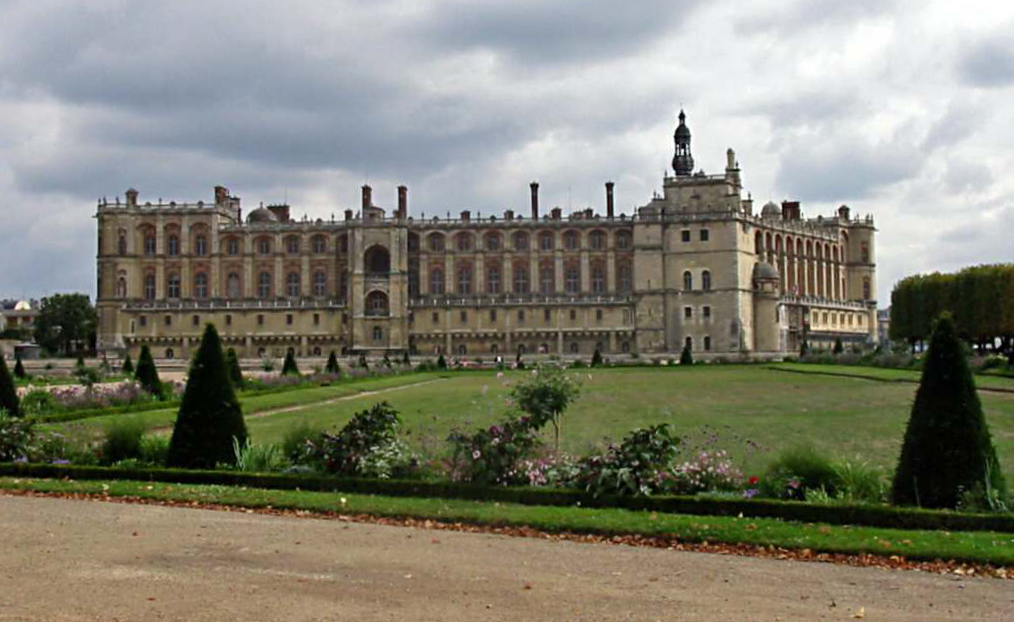
The Chateau where the peace was signed

The Peace of Saint-Germain-en-Laye was signed on 8 August 1570 by Charles IX of France, Gaspard II de Coligny and Jeanne d'Albret, to end the third war (1568-70) of the French Wars of Religion.

The Peace went much further than the March 1568 Peace of Longjumeau by establishing specific rights and responsibilities for French Protestants, generally known as Huguenots. Freedom of worship was permitted in two towns per gouvernment, while the Huguenots were allowed to maintain armed garrisons in four towns for a period of two years, after which they had to be returned to Royal control. However, the civil war resumed in 1572 after the targeted assassination of Huguenot leaders assembled in Paris spiralled into the St. Bartholomew's Day massacre.

== Third civil war ==
Nouvelle-Aquitaine; key locations 1568

Following the outbreak of civil war in 1568, the Huguenots under Coligny and Condé opted to defend the south-west by fortifying towns such as Angoulême and Cognac. As they moved south in March 1569, their rear guard was trapped by the Royalists at Jarnac, with Condé cut down after surrendering. However, the bulk of the Huguenot army reached Cognac, with Coligny assuming leadership on behalf of Henry of Navarre and Condé's son Henri.

At Châlus on 11 June, Coligny joined up with 14,000 German mercenaries financed by Elizabeth I of England, originally led by the Duke of Zweibrücken who died shortly before their meeting. This combined army of 25,000 defeated a slightly larger royalist force at La Roche-l'Abeille on 25th. They then laid siege to Poitiers, which was held by Henry I, Duke of Guise; it was still resisting when the main Royal army under Tavannes invested the nearby Huguenot town of Châtellerault.

Forced to withdraw from Poitiers, on 3 October Coligny's forces were decisively defeated at the Battle of Moncontour, but although his army incurred heavy casualties, the remnants were able to retreat in good order. Rather than pursuing Coligny, Tavannes moved onto Saint-Jean-d'Angély, whose possession would enable him to break the Huguenot hold on Aquitaine. Although the town surrendered on 2 December, the Royalists lost thousands of men to disease or hunger, while many of their Swiss and German mercenaries mutinied after not being paid.

Coligny and his remaining troops had moved into Languedoc, where he linked up with 4,000 men led by Montgomery. After an unsuccessful siege of Toulouse in January 1570, their combined force marched north through the Rhone valley towards Paris and reached Montbrison in May. Learning that a Royalist force under Brissac was advancing on the nearby Huguenot stronghold of La Charité, Coligny intercepted and defeated him at Arnay le Duc on 25 June 1570. With Paris under threat, the state bankrupt and the Royal army in ruins, this gave him a strong position to negotiate with Charles IX of France.

== Negotiations ==
=== Early doubts ===
No sooner had the war begun than moderate Politique voices on the royal council advocated for a return to status quo ante bellum. The bishop Jean de Monluc as early as 2 December 1568 argued for a restoration of the edict of Longjumeau, and the provision of a governorship to Condé, Armand de Gontaut, baron de Biron likewise refused to serve in a war he felt was unjust. Hôpital too advocated for such a settlement, however he had been marginalised from the government by the beginning of the war, and had lost his seals to the chancellorship. The financial difficulties that had forced the crown to conclude the peace of Longjumeau the prior year also played upon the king, who considered in January the possibility of a temporary truce until proper funding for the armies and mercenaries could be arranged.

==== Jarnac to Poitiers ====
When the battle of Jarnac was not followed by a disintegration of the Protestant army, as expected, the crown's army itself began to fall apart in the summer, mutinous for lack of pay and suffering from disease. This motivated more serious outreaches of peace, and Catherine broached the idea of a marriage between Margaret of Valois-Angoulême and Henry IV of France to seal away the civil war, whilst the Huguenot army was encamped outside of Poitiers. Coligny was likewise interested in peace at this time, and advocated for full freedom of religion, and the declaration of a war against Spain to take advantage of the situation in the Netherlands. The king rebuffed these attempts, offering amnesty to the leadership if they laid down their arms.

==== Moncontour to Saint-Jean-de-Angély ====
With the crushing victory at Moncontour the crown again hoped it represented the end of Huguenot resistance. Tavannes and Cossé wanted to use the opportunity to establish a peace, however the crown pressed on with its attempts on Saint-Jean-d'Angély, hoping for a final victory. The baron de Castlenau offered to negotiate favourable terms for Navarre and the Huguenot subjects, provided they throw down their arms and petition the crown as loyal subjects. Meanwhile, as the siege stretched on with no victory in sight, the moderates on the council again petitioned for peace on 24 November. Charles was more open to the idea than he had been a month ago, with the loss of Blaise de Lasseran-Massencôme, seigneur de Montluc who had been fighting Jeanne d'Albret in the south, the ravaging of the royal army outside Saint-Jean-de-Angély by disease and famine and the comparatively growing strength of the Protestant viscounts in Languedoc. Consequently he sent Cossé and de Losses to negotiate, their delegation meeting with Albret and Rochefoucault. The Huguenot nobility, largely tired of war, was eager to accept but on certain conditions. The nobility deputised Teligny to seek assurances from the king and negotiate a full liberty of conscience, restitution of property and office and a rescinding of sentences against the Huguenot leadership (Coligny had forfeited his title and been sentenced to death by the Parlement of Paris.) These terms had been agreed upon by the Princes and approved by Jeanne d'Albret. Albret meanwhile wrote to Catherine, announcing she would rather die than compromise on the issue of public worship.

==== Toulouse to Arnay-le-Duc ====
For the moment however the crown felt its position was strong enough to reject such terms, and negotiations ceased until February. A new attempt was made by the Huguenots to push for their terms in February 1570, with La Noue, Téligny and Bricquemault negotiating for the Huguenots, and the moderates Biron and de Mesmes for the crown. Conscious of the difficult international situation these more serious attempts put her in Catherine wrote to Philip in Madrid, explaining the extreme circumstances that necessitated negotiation with heretics. Charles went further in his letters to the Spanish court, describing the kingdom as being practically in ruin, and negotiation necessary to maintain France as a state. Regardless the crown rebuffed the Huguenots again over their demands regarding worship. In March the Huguenot Princes met at Montreuil to reaffirm their commitment to free exercise of religion being a pre-requisite to peace negotiation.

Biron would plead with the king in March, arguing there was no harm in listening to the demands of the Huguenots. The king relented, and in April talks resumed to tackle the gaps between the sides on matters of surety towns, payments of Coligny's reiters and free exercise of religion. Téligny was instructed not to meet the crown's negotiators in the presence of Charles, Cardinal of Lorraine who was considered by the Huguenot camp to be the head of the most reactionary elements of the Catholic camp. Whilst Téligny would meet Charles, and Biron would meet Coligny, consensus could still not be reached on the sticking point issues. Rumours in May that Henri de Navarre desired to run away from the rebel camp to court enlivened the interest of Charles in a royal marriage proposal to draw him away, which would extinguish a key source of legitimacy for the rebel forces enabling far more stringent negotiations. For now though the marriage proposal came to nought.

In July Cossé warned the king that the crown's army was on the cusp of disintegration unless peace was signed shortly. Coligny, who had grown weary of the war, was also in a mood to compromise on the red lines the Huguenots had drawn regarding exercise of religion, and the leadership of the Huguenots agreed to accept public worship on the lines of the Edict of Saint-Germain. Resultingly the Huguenots offered to accede to worship in three towns per gouvernment, amnesty for past actions and the restoration of property. The crown countered with an offer of two towns and also insisted on an exclusion zone around Paris in which worship would be prohibited, but offered worship in all cities currently held by the Huguenots to sweeten the deal. The crown demanded that the Huguenots pay part of the cost of their reiter's wages; however, it eventually agreed to shoulder the entire burden. Concerning surety towns the crown offered La Rochelle, Angoulême and Montauban, countering the Huguenot demands for La Charité with offers of Perpignan or Lansac. The crown would later change its offer from Angoulême to Cognac, but relented to the Huguenots on their demand for La Charité.

The Protestant nobility accepted this compromise, which favoured their heartland in the south at the expense of Huguenots in the north and east, and on 8 August 1570 peace was signed at the royal residence of Saint-Germain-en-Laye.

== Terms of the peace ==
=== Past wrongs ===
Article 1 of the peace deal concerned crimes and other wrongs committed during the course of the prior three wars of religion. These were to be quenched and forgotten. Article 2 forbade the making of trouble over disputes that had arisen during the wars; the crown beseeched its subjects to live peacefully with one another. The next article mandated that the Catholic religion be restored in all regions where Huguenot ascendency during or prior to the civil war had seen it suppressed in sole favour of Huguenot worship. Article 4 built upon a concept that had been established first in the Edict of July, prohibiting subjects from investigating their neighbours' religions.

=== Parameters of worship ===
Article 5 allowed all gentlemen exercising high justice over their estates to practice the Huguenot faith when present on their estates, likewise their subjects who lived on the estates would be permitted practice of the religion. Article 6 outlined that when high justice was not enjoyed, religious worship was only to be in one's own house, for the members of the household up to ten people, assuming guests were present. Article 8 was a list of the two suburbs per gouvernment where Protestant worship would be permitted in churches and other open displays. Article 9 included the compromise worked out in August, allowing worship to also be conducted in those towns that the Huguenots held on 1 August 1570. Article 10 established that outside of the above towns there was to be no preaching or religious teaching elsewhere. Article 10 created a further prohibition: Protestant worship was to be forbidden within two leagues of wherever the court was currently residing, including for members of the court. Article 12 built upon this, as Protestant worship was outlawed within 10 leagues of Paris, as it had been after Longjumeau, but also the towns of Senlis, Meaux, Melun and Chartres. In keeping with prior edicts, however, house searches for Huguenot worship would not be permitted in any of these towns.

=== Integration into society ===
Article 15 broadened the scope of the edict from prior edicts, outlining access to universities, schools, hospitals, and alm houses, which was to be done irrespective of religion. Article 16 concerned itself with the reputation of the leading Huguenot nobles, specifically Jeanne d'Albret and Gaspard de Coligny. They were not to have their reputations impugned by rumours. Article 23 covered new ground for peace edicts, prohibiting the levying of undue taxes upon the Huguenot population, and discharging the Huguenot population if they were currently indebted to such taxes. Article 26 returned to familiar territory for peace edicts, guaranteeing the return of property, title and office, with the exception of those who had been replaced from their position in the high courts, who would be able to receive financial compensation for the loss of their office. Article 32 annulled all sentences, arrests seizures and decrees of the war that concerned matters of religion. This notably included the 50,000 écus bounty on Coligny's head and the Parlements removal of his title of Admiral. Further all monuments and marks erected to commemorate executions during the war were to be razed and removed. Article 34 repeated Longjumeau's demand that Protestants maintain their observance of Catholic holy days and feast days, prohibiting them from working on fasting days or running their butcheries during Lent. Article 35 was also new ground for peace edicts, allowing Protestants to request the removal of 4 judges when cases concerning religion got appealed to the Parlement in future. Article 36, modified this provision for Toulouse, allowing them to have their cases heard by the maîtres des requêtes instead.

=== Surety ===
Article 38 in recognition of how much trust had been damaged by this particularly brutal civil war, permitted four Huguenot-controlled towns (Montauban, La Rochelle, La Charité and Cognac) to remain fortified as a guarantee of the peace, so that they might return to their homes. This status would be granted for a two-year period, the guarantee of which would be made by the young princes of Navarre and Condé. Despite being allowed to remain in arms in these towns, they were obliged to allow Catholic worship, in line with article 3.

== Registration and enforcement ==
=== Registration ===
As with the edict of Longjumeau, the crown remembered the resistance the Parlement had put up to the Edict of Amboise, and to avoid a laboured several month period of ambiguity, mandated that the Parlements register it immediately, and further that all royal officials swear an oath to uphold its terms. For those who non violently obstructed the edicts implementation the punishment was to be whipping and a fine, for the violent obstruction, death. It was hoped that this would ensure that the edict would be adhered to more closely and promptly. As a result, after the edict was signed on 8 August, it would be registered by the Parlement of Paris (which had jurisdiction over half the country) three days later on 11 August.

=== Enforcement ===
In a similar manner to all past religious edicts, enforcement proved far harder to ensure than registration. Alongside the sending out of commissioners to oversee its implementation the crown for the first time sent out financial advisers, whose duty it would be raise and reclaim revenues that had been lost due to the long period of troubles. It would prove challenging for these officials to reacquire the funds. The Catholic representative assigned to La Rochelle complained of the slow nature of enforcement for returning Catholic worship to the city as stipulated by article 3. Churches that had been burned by the Huguenots were agreed to be lightly taxed until they could recover. In more successful developments for the edict, the reiters Coligny and the crown had hired were successfully paid and removed from the kingdom.

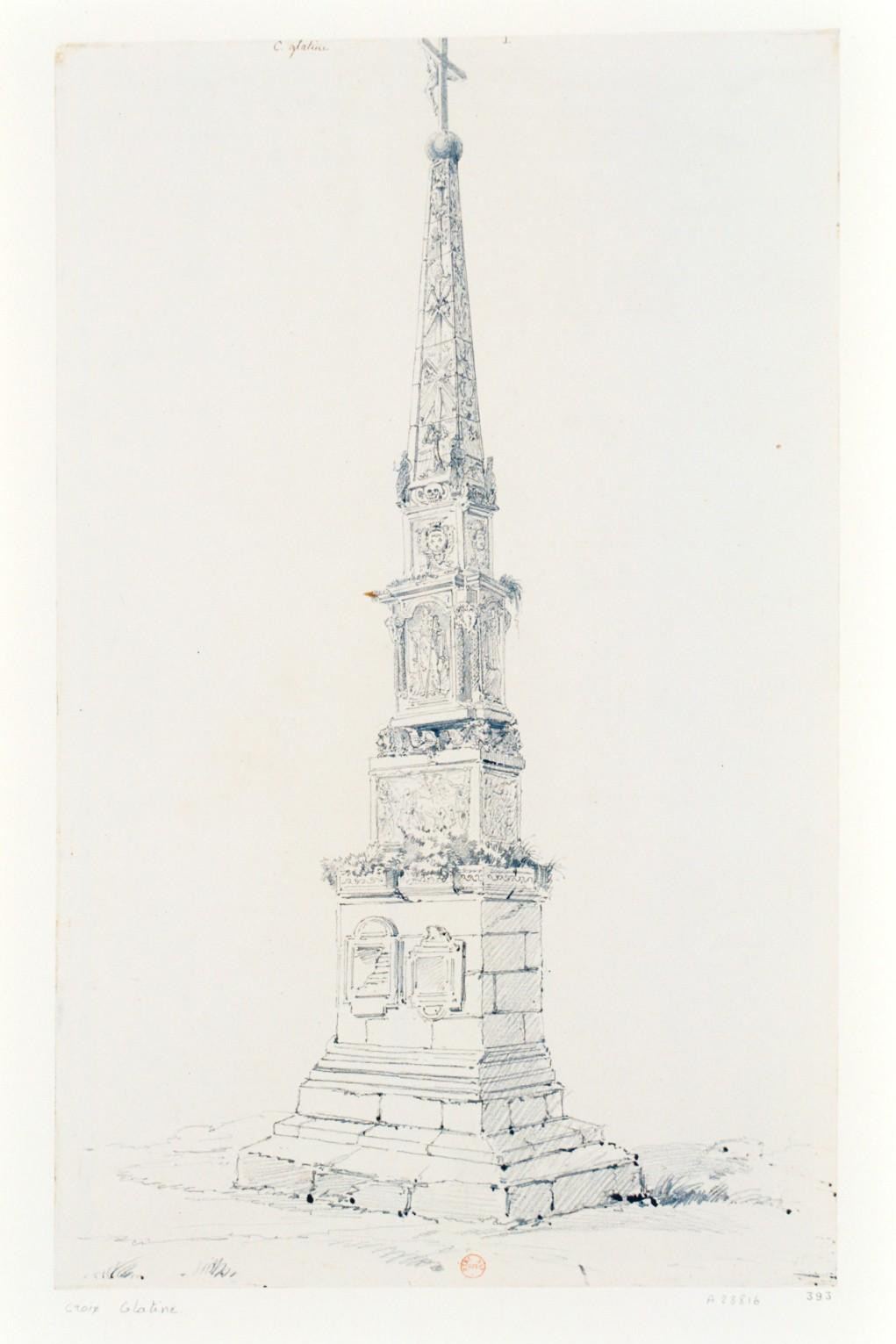
Sketch of the Cross, that violated the edict

==== Rouen ====
In Rouen, 500 Calvinists, armed in contravention of the edict, passed by a vicar on the road to their suburban service at Bondeville. A scuffle ensued, and a Catholic militia descended upon the Protestants. After a large fight 40 Protestants were left dead. Five Catholic militiamen were arrested for their role in the violence, and sentenced on 5 April 1571. The following day an angry crowd of militant Catholics descended upon the prison and freed them all. Greatly annoyed at this disorder, the council of 24 which administered Rouen called for a commission to restore order. The duke of Montmorency and his troops arrived and calmed the town.

==== Gastines ====
There was great disorder in Paris over the enforcement of article 32. A cross had been erected on the site of a razed Huguenot house, the resident of which had been executed during the civil wars. As part of the peace terms, this cross had to be removed from the site of the Gastine's house, and so a team set about preparing to remove it. This greatly angered militant Catholic elements of the Parisian population, who rallied around the cross as a holy and righteous memorial. Several bouts of violence accompanied the various attempts to remove it, the most serious riots in December 1571. Eventually the cross was moved to the Holy Innocents' Cemetery as a compromise with the rioters. The violent resistance of elements of the population to the edict would again come to bear in August 1572.

=== Modification ===
Militant Catholic pressure was not confined to acts of mob violence, however, and pressure was brought to bear on the king to modify the peace he had so recently signed. Article 15 was altered to remove Huguenots' right of access to university teaching, and the king declared on 8 October that there would be no Huguenots at the University of Paris. On 20 November he further prohibited any role in providing education across the country for Huguenots.

== Long-term consequences ==
=== St Bartholomew's day massacre and the resumption of war ===
==== Disgrace of Guise ====
The coming of peace coincided with the disgrace of the Guise family, who had led the war party since 1567. The cardinal of Lorraine, depressed at the peace, was conscious that his position at court was too compromised to continue by the crown having pursued this line, so he retired to his estates. Meanwhile, his nephew, the young Duke of Guise, found himself more formally disgraced. During the final months of the war he had begun romantically pursuing the king's sister Marguerite. Catherine de' Medici and Charles were by now committed to the policy of marrying her to Henry of Navarre as a method to ensure long term peace, and were furious when rumours of Guise's tryst reached their ears. They considered having him assassinated, but settled on exiling him from court.

==== Marriage plans and Spain ====
Negotiations for a marriage between Marguerite and Henri were finalised on 4 April 1572 by Jeanne and Catherine, with the marriage to go ahead in August. For much of this period the Protestant leadership had avoided the capital, not keen to trust the king's promise of safety in doing so. In September 1571 Coligny made a tentative return to court, keen to persuade the monarchy of his plans for an invasion of the Spanish Netherlands. He remained unable to convince the crown of his course losing several votes in council. However the crown moved closer to his position, unwilling to fully break with Spain yet happy to allow the rebel Louis of Nassau to hold up in Soissons. Coligny would not however stay at court long, and after five weeks, not feeling safe enough to remain, he retired.

The Guise family meanwhile petitioned the crown to re-open the investigation into the murder of Francis, Duke of Guise in 1563, still convinced this would allow them a method to attack Coligny, whom they accused of involvement. The crown refused, however.

==== Marriage and a massacre ====
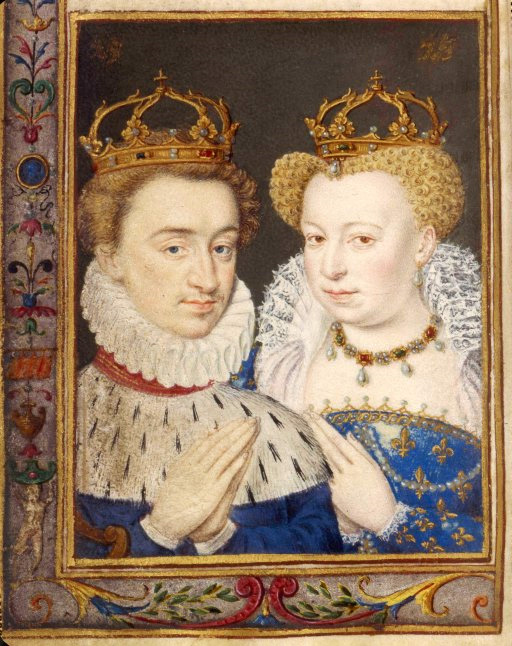
1572 portrait of the royal couple

Coligny again returned to court in August, along with much of the other Huguenot nobility who had stayed away, to commemorate the marriage that would seal the peace. Several days after the marriage, an assassin would make an attempt on Coligny's life, wounding him in the shoulder, but non fatally. The Huguenot nobility exploded in anger at what they assumed was the work of Guise, if not Catherine herself. With the nobles threatening bloody retribution on Guise, a royal council meeting was held, in which it was agreed to assassinate the Huguenot leadership on the pretext that they were about to send their troops into Paris for more extensive reprisals. On the morning of 24 August hit teams fanned out to execute the various Huguenot leaders, killing Coligny in his bedroom. When word of these killings spread, the population joined in against the general Huguenot population of the city, massacring between 3,000 and 5,000. The massacres then spread to other parts of France.

==== Further edict modification ====
While the king maintained his support for the peace of Saint-Germain-en-Laye during both the assassination attempt on Coligny and the resulting massacre, it was further eroded as the king took the opportunity to ban Protestants from serving in the royal court and suspended assemblies. The Protestant cities in the south, furious at the betrayal of the assassinations and what they took to be a royal ordered nationwide massacre, entered rebellion. This began the fourth war of religion with the failed royal siege of La Rochelle.

=== Assessment by contemporaries ===
More militant Catholics regarded the peace terms agreed with abject horror. Monluc despondently remarked that the Huguenots had "won by writing what they lost by fighting." Lorraine too remarked on the peace that the "articles in it are bad and pernicious but what is still more annoying is the despair." The baron de Gordes lieutenant governor of Dauphiné opined that the peace should not have been published until Huguenots were disarmed and removed from their occupation of towns. The Parlement of Toulouse bemoaned to the king in June 1572 that the provision of amnesty in the peace was causing much disorder, due to criminals falsely claiming themselves to be religious prisoners.

The Huguenot aristocracy remained more cautious in their appraisal of the peace, approving many of its terms but fearful that they might be betrayed at any moment. As a result, most Huguenot aristocrats stayed on their estates, where they could be confident of their security, only departing in August 1572 to attend the marriage of Henri and Marguerite.

=== Assessment by historians ===
Historians have generally regarded it as the most favourable peace to the Protestants of the early religious wars. Sutherland describes it as "the first pro-Protestant peace" while other authors characterise it as a "Protestant charter." Roelker goes as far as to call it the "apogee of Huguenot power." These historians highlight the specificity of the edict, insofar as it listed the towns to be granted worship as opposed to leaving it up to provincial governors to assign towns as had been the system previously, the inclusion of new provisions regarding taxation and access to education, and the provision of surety towns that gave a military security to the Protestants beyond the goodwill of the king. Other historians, however, are more guarded in their assessment of the peace, such as Roberts who characterises it as largely a reproduction in content and tone of the failed peace of Longjumeau.

== See also ==
- French Wars of Religion
- List of treaties

== Sources ==
- Benedict, Phillip (2003). Rouen during the Wars of Religion. Cambridge University Press. ISBN 0521547970.
- Benedict, Phillip (1978). "The Saint Bartholomew's Massacres in the Provinces". The Historical Journal. 21 (2): 205–225. doi:10.1017/S0018246X00000510. JSTOR 2638258. S2CID 159715479.
- Carroll, Stuart (2009). Martyrs and Murderers: The Guise Family and the Making of Europe. Oxford University Press. ISBN 9780199596799.
- Diefendorf, Barbara (1991). Beneath the Cross: Catholics and Huguenots in Sixteenth-Century Paris. Oxford University Press. ISBN 0195070135.
- Holt, Mack (2005). The French Wars of Religion 1562-1629. Cambridge University Press. ISBN 9780521547505.
- Jouanna, Arlette; Boucher, Jacqueline (1998). Histoire et dictionnaire des Guerres de religion (in French). Bouquins. ISBN 2-221-07425-4.
- Kingdon, R.M (1967). Geneva and the Consolidation of the French Protestant Movement 1564-1572. Librarie Droz. ISBN 978-2600030168.
- Knecht, Robert (2010). The French Wars of Religion 1559-1598. Routledge. ISBN 9781408228197.
- Potter, David (1997). The French Wars of Religion: Selected Documents. Palgrave Macmillan. ISBN 0333647998.
- Roberts, Penny (2013). Peace and Authority During the French Religious Wars c.1560–1600. Palgrave Macmillan. ISBN 9781137326744.
- Roelker, Nancy (1996). One King, One Faith: The Parlement of Paris and the Religious Reformation of the Sixteenth Century. University of California Press. ISBN 0520086260.
- Roelker, Nancy (1968). Queen of Navarre: Jeanne d'Albret 1528-1572. Harvard University Press.
- Salmon, J.H.M. (1975). Society in Crisis: France in the Sixteenth Century. Metheun & Co. ISBN 0416730507.
- Shimizu, J. (1970). Conflict of Loyalties: Politics and Religion in the Career of Gaspard de Coligny Admiral of France 1519-1572. Librarie Droz. ISBN 9782600030335.
- Sutherland, Nicola (1980). The Huguenot Struggle for Recognition. Yale University Press. ISBN 0300023286.
- Thompson, James (1909). The Wars of Religion in France, 1559-1576: The Huguenots, Catherine de Medici and Phillip II. Chicago University Press.
- Wood, James (1996). The King's Army: Warfare, Soldiers and Society during the Wars of Religion in France 1562-1576. Cambridge University Press. ISBN 0521525136.
