= François III de La Rochefoucauld =

French nobleman, courtier and soldier

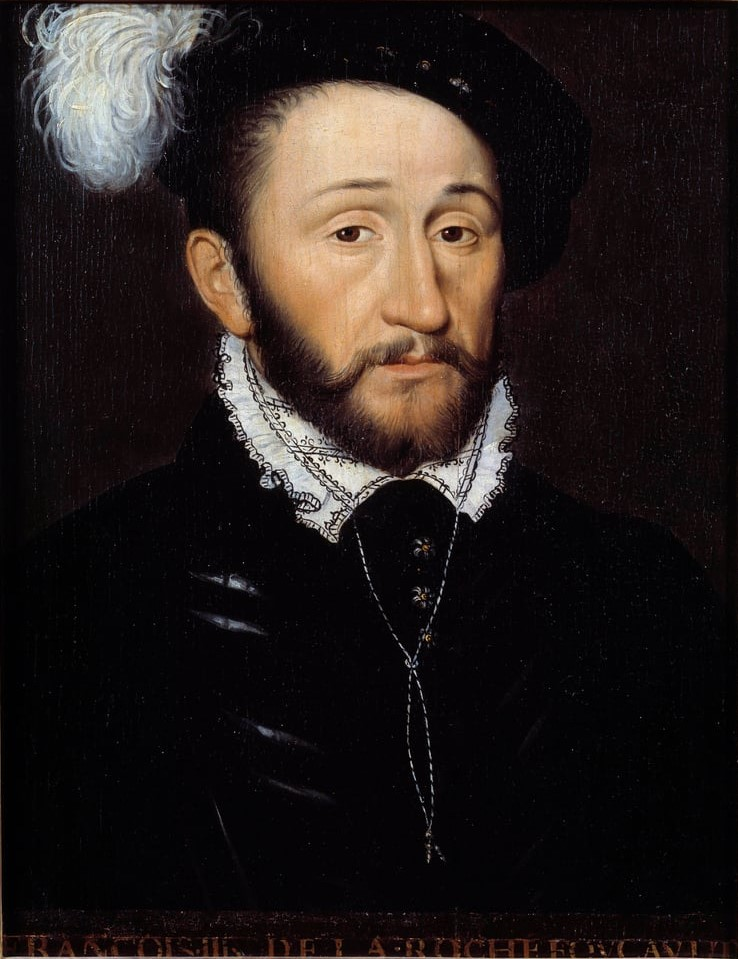
Portrait of Francois III de La Rochefoucauld

François III, Count of La Rochefoucauld, prince of Marcillac, count of Roucy and baron of Verteuil (1521 – 24 August 1572) was a French courtier and soldier, serving as gentleman-in-ordinary to the king's chamber. He was a friend of Charles de Téligny and Louise de Coligny, serving as one of the witnesses to their marriage, whilst his humour and intelligence rendered him a favourite of Henry II of France and Charles IX of France. He is also notable as one of the Protestant leaders killed in the St. Bartholomew's Day massacre.

== Early life ==
He was born in Paris in 1521 as son of count François II de La Rochefoucauld and Anne de Polignac.

== Career ==
He became a brilliant soldier, fighting with distinction under Henry II of France during the first three French civil wars. According to Brantôme in his youth he found favour in Henry II's court, becoming a knight in the Order of the King, fighting in the king's entourage and having quite a busy military career. In 1552 he took part in the siege of Metz as captain of light cavalry. He and constable de Montmorency were captured at the Battle of Saint-Quentin on 10 August 1557 - de La Rochefoucauld was then a lieutenant leading a company of gendarmes raised by the Duke of Lorraine. In 1550, his position having become untenable due to his Protestantism, he considered leaving the French court and moving to Germany, but Francis II's death and Catherine de Medici's entreaties led him to abandon this plan.

He became a leader of the Huguenot party in 1562 and from then on took part in all the important battles of the first three French Wars of Religion. He fought for the House of Bourbon against the House of Lorraine. The Prince de Condé was his brother-in-law (de La Rochefoucauld was married to Charlotte de Roucy and the Prince to Éléonore de Roucy, both women being daughters of Charles de Roye, count of Roucy). He took part in the blockade of Paris before protecting the Prince in Normandy. He fought in the Battle of Dreux, facing the battalion commanded by constable Anne, and the Siege of Orléans, capturing Gergeau. He took part in the bataille de Saint-Denis (10 November 1567) before accompanying the prince de Condé to Touraine.

He and the Prince fought as part of a vast cavalry force at the Surprise of Meaux on 28 September 1567. de La Rochefoucauld also fought at the Siege of Chartres and raised a huge army to save the prince de Condé at La Rochelle, before accompanying him to Languedoc to join forces with Jacques II de Crussol's forces. On 13 March 1569 he fought at the Battle of Jarnac, in which the prince de Condé was killed. He then fought under Henry of Navarre, the prince's paternal nephew, at La Roche-l'Abeille. He also took part in the assaults on Beaugency and Pons and the sieges of Nontron, Lusignan and Poitiers in summer 1569 before coming to the assistance of Châtellerault and fighting at Port-de-Piles and on 3 October 1569 at Moncontour.

After the peace of August 1570, he returned to the royal court, where his pleasant conversation and good spirits made him a confidant of the 20-year-old king Charles IX. He was in Paris the day before the St. Bartholomew's Day massacre and so Charles IX tried to convince him to move to the Louvre and suggested he move in with his valets de chambre, but de la Rochefoucauld replied "their feet stink". On the day of the massacre the Catholics found de La Rochefoucauld and brought him out of the palace, killing him with other Protestant noblemen in the neighbouring streets. His body was stripped and thrown into the Seine.

== Personal life ==
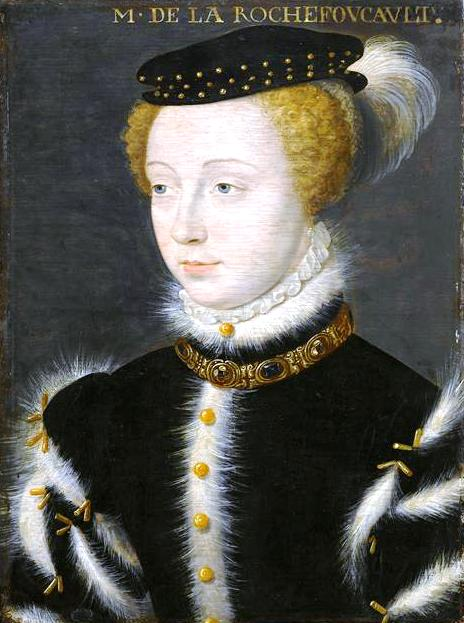
Portrait of his second wife Charlotte de Roye (1537-1569) attributed to Marc Duval

His first marriage was to Sylvie Pic de la Mirandole, the sister of his brother's wife Fulvia Pico della Mirandola. Silvia and Fulvia (Silvie and Fulvie in French) were both descendants of an elder brother of the philosopher Giovanni Pico della Mirandola. Before her death, they were the parents of one son:

- François IV de La Rochefoucauld (1554–1591), who was killed at Saint-Yrieix by the Catholic League; he married Claude d'Estissac in 1587.

On 31 May 1557, he remarried to Charlotte de Roye (1537–1569), Countess of Roucy, sister in law to the prince de Condé, with whom he had six children, who all bore the name and coat arms of Roye before that of La Rochefoucauld in obedience to Charlotte and Francois' marriage contract. They included:

- Josué de La Rochefoucauld-Roye (d. 1589), who died unmarried.
- Charles de La Rochefoucauld-Roye (1560–1605), who married Claude de Gontaut-Biron, daughter of Marshal of France Armand de Gontaut.
- Isabelle de La Rochefoucauld-Roye, who married Jean Louis de La Rochefoucauld, Count of Randan.
- Madeleine de La Rochefoucauld-Roye, who married Just Louis IV de Tournon, Count de Roussillon, Baron de Durteil, eldest son of Count Justus II de Tournon and Claudine de La Tour-Turenne, a lady-in-waiting to Queen Marguerite.
- Henri De La Rochefoucauld-Roye (d. 1576)

=== Descendants ===
Through his eldest son François IV, he was a grandfather of François V de La Rochefoucauld (1588–1650), under whom the County was raise by King Louis XIII into a Duchy-peerage as the Duke of La Rochefoucauld in 1622.

Through his son Charles, he was a grandfather of François I de La Rochefoucauld, Count of Roucy (1603–1680), who married Julienne Catherine de la Tour d'Auvergne (a daughter of Henri de La Tour d'Auvergne); and Charlotte de La Rochefoucauld (1602–1637), who married Louis II de Champagne, Count La Suze.

Through his daughter Isabelle, he was a grandfather of Marie-Catherine de Senecey (1588–1677), the Première dame d'honneur to Queen Anne and royal governess to King Louis XIV. She married Henri de Bauffremont, Marquis of Senecey. After his death, Louis XIV created the Duchy of Randan and made her the first duchess of Randan in 1661.

Through his daughter Madeleine, he was a grandfather of Françoise de Tournon (d. 1621), who married Gaspard de Polignac, Viscount of Polignac, Marquis of Chalençon. They are ancestors of Dukes of Polignac and House of Monaco.

== Bibliography ==
- (in French) Jules Delaborde, « François de la Rochefoucauld », Paris, Bulletin historique et littéraire. Société de l'histoire du protestantisme français, volume XXIII, second series, ninth year, 1874, p. 434-451.
- (in French) P. Moret de la Fayole, Histoire généalogique de la maison de Roucy et de Roye, Coustelier, Francois, 1675, chapter XXV.
