= Peace of Longjumeau =

1568 treaty

Treaty of Longjumeau
- Picture of Charles IX who issued the peace
- Signed: 24 March 1568
- Location: Longjumeau
- Signatories: Charles IX of France; Louis, Prince of Conde (1530-1569)
- Languages: French

The Peace of Longjumeau (also known as the Treaty of Longjumeau or the Edict of Longjumeau) was signed on 23 March 1568 by Charles IX of France and Catherine de' Medici. The edict brought to an end the brief second war of the French Wars of Religion with terms that largely confirmed those of the prior edict of Amboise. Unlike the previous edict, it would not be sent to the Parlements to examine prior to its publication, due to what the crown had felt was obstructionism the last time. The edict would not last, however, as it was overturned later in the year by the Edict of Saint-Maur which outlawed Protestantism at the beginning of the third war of religion.

== Towards peace ==
After their defeat at the Battle of Saint-Denis the main Huguenot army fled eastwards in disarray, pursued by the royal army. In the wake of the battle, Charles IX sent out a letter to the rebel leadership, entreating the shattered Huguenots to lay down their arms in return for amnesty. The Huguenot leader Louis, Prince of Condé wrote back that they would lay down their arms if they were granted free exercise of religion, permission for their synods and an irrevocable edict of pacification. This angered the king, who replied that he would not negotiate with any subject as an equal. He further added that they had three days to lay down their arms, that he would grant the ability for gentleman to worship in their households and liberty of conscience and property to be maintained. He would not allow synods, and would insist on keeping the crown at arms until the rebels had laid down theirs.

This was unacceptable to Condé and his allies, so they continued their flight east, crossing the border into the Holy Roman Empire. As they fled they were pursued by forces under Charles de Cossé. However, he was ill inclined to give battle, preferring a truce. Having crossed the border, the shattered Huguenots linked up with a strong German mercenary force, and returned to France in early 1568 revitalised. This enlarged army was soon short on pay, however, and Condé decided to besiege Chartres to acquire funds for his men. The crown, also under heavy financial strain, remained keen to negotiate with this strengthened enemy, and in January Charles, Cardinal of Lorraine who had led the war party was sent to oversee the frontiers by Catherine de' Medici to better free her hand to negotiate.

== Edict ==
=== Negotiations ===
In February, with the siege of Chartres remaining inconclusive, Jean de Morvillier, Sebastien de l'Aubespine, François de Montmorency and Robertet d'Allaye were sent by the crown to seek more formal peace terms from Condé. For his part Condé gave the role of negotiation to Odet de Coligny, Charles de Téligny, Gaspard II de Coligny and François de Coligny d'Andelot. Feeling confident in their bargaining position the rebels demanded any edict be confirmed by all Parlements, and that two towns be given to the Protestants as surety, Boulogne-sur-Mer and La Rochelle. Feeling slighted by these requests the King protested against this slight to his honour, counter proposing on 4 March that political marriages be arranged between Henry I, Duke of Guise and Condé's daughter, and Andelot's son with Francis, Duke of Guise's daughter.

This proposal would however go nowhere, with the Huguenots counter demanding better observance of the edict by the kings officers than they felt had been true of Amboise. The king found this agreeable, and in return for his assurances on the matter, the Huguenots waived their demands for immediate Parlement assent and surety towns.

=== Terms ===
In large part the edict was a return to the terms that had defined the previous edict of Amboise, however without the modifications that were made to Amboise in 1565, when it was codified into a more permanent edict of pacification, which excluded more of the country from Protestant worship and officeholders. It began by emphasising that the king was seeking peace on the advice of the Duke of Anjou, Alençon and the Conseil du Roi.

To pay off the reiters the Huguenots had hired in Germany, so that they would go home quietly, 500,000 livres was appropriated from the Amboise chest. The edict required the Huguenots to lay down their arms, and to cease attempts to create foreign alliances independent of the state. In return office and favour would be restored to the Protestant nobility who had enjoyed it, including Condé with an amnesty for all his actions during the war. All private houses seized during the war were to be returned to their owners. As were any seized revenues from the clergy. Protestantism would be legally recognised by the crown, with worship permitted in the suburbs of one town per baillage and sénéchaussée. Worship would also be permitted outside of towns on nobles' rural estates, now that the crown had been assured there would be no plotting occurring at such gatherings. The edict also applied to Provence, which the prior edict had made an exception for.

There was to be an oblivion for all crimes committed during the civil war by any side. There was to be a prohibition on any subject raising levies or arms. No subject was to dispute with another over the payment of arrears or other such matters that had occurred due to the outbreak of the civil war until such time the edict was published in the presence of both sides. For Paris this would occur three days after the edict was published, and for the provinces eight days. Governors are to publish this edict without waiting for Parlement to do so. After publication Huguenots were to disarm and deliver the towns under their control over to the crown.

== Registration and enforcement ==
=== Registration ===
In contrast to the previous edict, which had found itself stuck in the provincial Parlements for over a year prior to its registration, the process was a relatively smooth one for registering the edict of Longjumeau. This was in large part due to an altered strategy from the crown, which sent the edict out to provincial governors to publish and enforce, prior to sending it to Parlement, thus presenting a fait accompli to the courts. As such, with this and the necessary menacing hints provided, the Parlement of Paris would register the edict on 27 March, three days after it was published by the crown. The provincial Parlements would follow Paris' lead.

=== Enforcement ===
The crown would initially not enforce part of the agreement on its end. Whilst the edict mandated the crown immediately disarm, this was viewed as impractical in light of the presence of reiters within France's borders. Given the violence and chaos that had followed in the reiters' wake at the end of the first war of religion as they were directed to leave France, it was thought best to supervise them on their exit with the royal army. When news of the terms the crown had negotiated reached the various cities of France, there was much anger among the militant parts of the Catholic population, with riots in Toulouse, Rouen, Orléans among other cities. Catholic leagues flourished, despite the edict's prohibition on such confederations.

The Protestant strongholds in the south also rejected the edict as unsatisfactory. Castres and Montpellier refused entry to their royal governors and retinues when they arrived to restore order. La Rochelle, which had remained neutral in the first civil war, likewise refused entry to its royal governor, until he had agreed to enter without his troops.

Further detriment to the peace would be the continued fighting, while the war had been officially ended on 24 March. Joyeuse would continue campaigning with his royal army in the South, capturing Aramon in May. Royalist leader Sommerive likewise continued to fight, defeating the Huguenot leaders Montbrun and d'Acier, who had also remained in the field, in a pitched battle. The Huguenot viscounts who had relieved the siege of Orléans during the war, similarly decided to remain at arms. A Protestant captain and his troops were massacred at Fréjus.

== Aftermath and revocation ==
=== Court politics ===
The peace would be an uneasy one; neither the Huguenots or the crown were truly satisfied with the terms of the edict, which financial pressures had forced on them. The balance on the royal council, which had favoured the moderate faction, began to swing, with the radical Cardinal of Lorraine's return to council and the Duke of Anjou, who controlled the crown's army, falling into the Cardinals' orbit. The moderate Chancellor Michel de l'Hôpital, conscious that his conciliatory response to the Surprise of Meaux had lost him Catherine's confidence, withdrew from attending council in June. Likewise Catherine's Italian favourites such as Louis Gonzaga, Duke of Nevers began to make their more anti-Protestant views felt on the court's policy direction.

=== Crown actions ===
The crown remained strapped for money, and in a great amount of debt, so the court turned to the Pope, who offered to put the revenues of the French Catholic church at their disposal to alleviate their debts, on condition that these funds be used against the Huguenots. Hopital made his final appearance at court, returning to argue strenuously against the acceptance of this deal as an infringement on Gallican liberty. During the council meeting, he got into a shouting match with Lorraine, who grabbed his beard in anger, before the two could be separated by Marshal Montmorency. The council would vote on the deal, with a majority for acceptance, the king would issue letter patents confirming the Papal bull. Hopital would respond by asking Catherine to relieve him of his office, and she accepted, allowing him to retire.

=== Huguenot actions ===
The Huguenots meanwhile had disregarded the prohibition to foreign alliances, forming a compact with Protestant rebels in the Spanish Netherlands in August, agreeing to support each other against their respective monarchs' 'evil counsel.' Fernando Álvarez de Toledo, 3rd Duke of Alba the leading Spanish military authority in the Spanish Netherlands protested strongly to Charles IX of this, however the king meekly stated he could not control his subjects. The leading Huguenots were at this time warned of a plan to arrest them by the royal council, the information having been leaked to them by Gaspard de Saulx who allowed his letters on the matter to be intercepted. As a result, the aristocratic leadership fled south, hurrying to the safety of their stronghold in La Rochelle. Arriving in mid September, they took up arms, beginning the third war of religion. Subsequently, the crown revoked the edict, replacing it with the hardline Catholic Edict of Saint-Maur.
