= Surprise of Meaux =

Failed French coup by aristocratic Huguenots

- Part of the French Wars of Religion
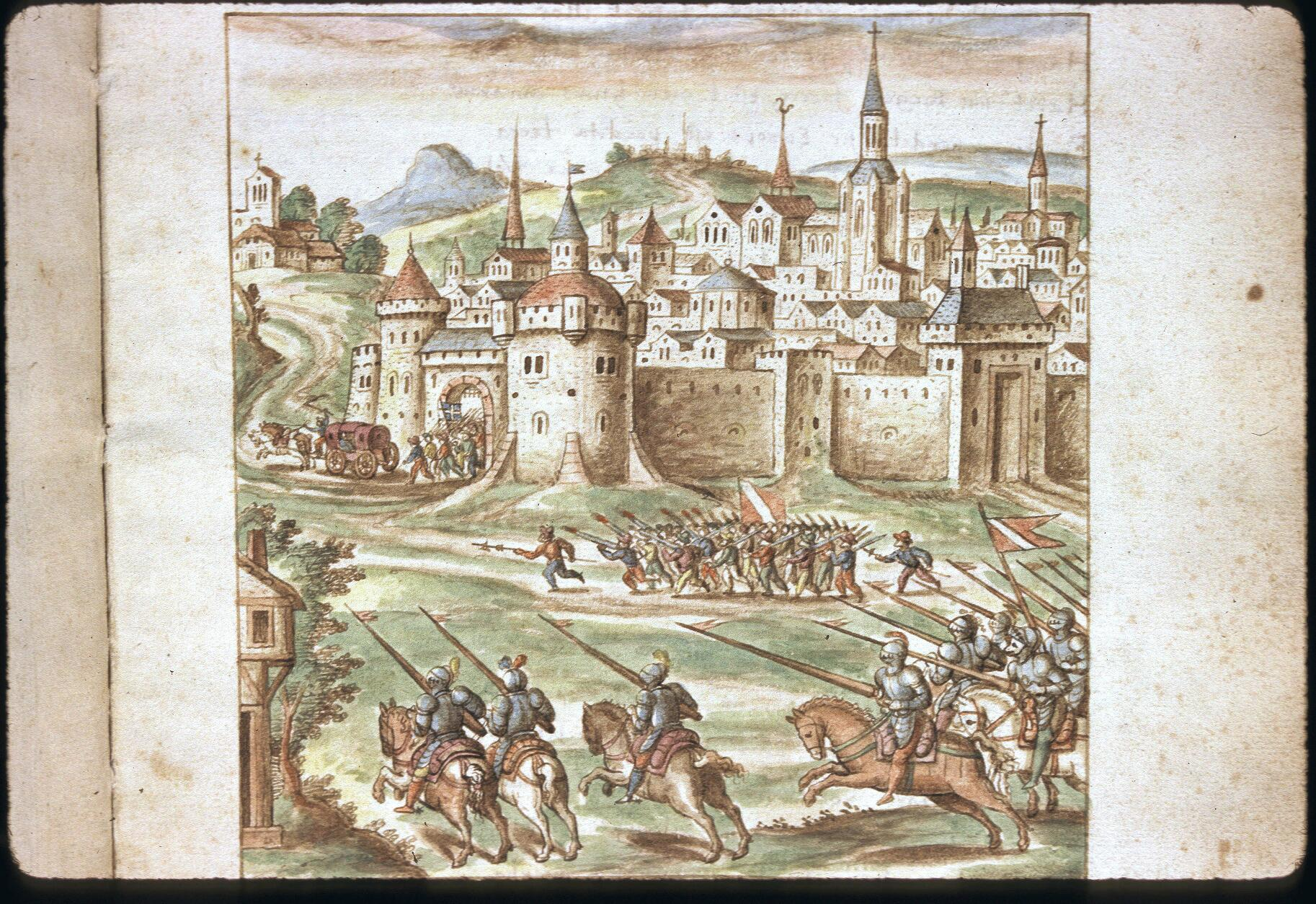
- Image of the Surprise of Meaux in progress by unknown artist (1577)
Date	28 September 1567
Location	Meaux, France
Result	Coup failed

Belligerents
French Huguenot forces	Royalists

Commanders and leaders
Louis I de Bourbon, prince de Condé	Filippo di Piero Strozzi

Strength
1,500	6,000

Casualties and losses
Unknown	Unknown

The surprise of Meaux (La surprise de Meaux) was a failed coup attempt by leading aristocratic Huguenots which precipitated the second French War of Religion. Dissatisfied with their lot, and under the pretext of fear of extermination, Louis, Prince of Condé and Gaspard II de Coligny plotted to seize the king, Charles IX, while he was staying near Meaux. Alerted by the mustering of the Huguenots, the royal court made a dash for Paris, fighting off attempts to break through to them en route. Their plan foiled, the Huguenots laid siege to the city, beginning the second war. The event would be of lasting importance in the reputation it gave its architects for sedition.

== Between the wars ==
=== Bayonne and Alba ===
The first French Wars of Religion was brought to a close with the Edict of Amboise in 1563, which was later consolidated into a pacification edict. Despite this peace offering concessions to the Huguenots, the leading nobles of their faction remained suspicious as to the crown's ultimate intentions. In 1565, the queen mother, Catherine de' Medici, held a meeting with Fernando Álvarez de Toledo the 3rd Duke of Alba at Bayonne in which a potential marriage alliance was discussed. Among the leading Huguenots, this meeting was interpreted very differently, with some suggesting a plan to liquidate all Huguenots in France had been secretly arranged at this conference. This was brought to the fore again in 1567, when Alba marched north, along the Spanish Road to the Spanish Netherlands to crush the Dutch Revolt that had broken out in the region.

This march along France's border unnerved Huguenots and Catholics alike in the French court, and it was agreed to hire 6,000 Swiss mercenaries, for the purpose of protecting the borders if Alba decided instead to march south on the country. Louis, Prince of Condé, Gaspard II de Coligny and the other noble Huguenots, chose to interpret this move as a sinister one, with the mercenaries to act as Alba's allies in liquidating the French Protestants, sweeping across France.

=== Edict modification ===
Around the same time as Alba was marching north to destroy the rebellion, a modification was made to the Edict of Pacification in July, expanding the ban on Protestant worship from Paris to the entire Île-de-France region and further prohibiting Protestants from holding office in the region. Whilst this was largely a move designed to suppress the rebelliousness of the capital area, and had the support of the moderate Michel de l'Hôpital, it was likewise interpreted as a prelude to extermination. Condé got into a shouting match with the King Charles, and shortly thereafter, decided to withdraw from court. A little while later, nominally because he had 'discovered designs against him' but largely in fact because he had been passed over in favour of Filippo di Piero Strozzi for command of the Swiss troops, Coligny followed Condé in departing court.

Writing from his estate, Condé protested in a letter to Catherine about the 'revocation of the Edict' and other plots against him, she replied on 29 August the true purpose of the troops as defence against the Spanish, and tried to invite him to return to court.

== Conspiracy forms ==
=== Synods ===
While the dissatisfied nobles had been harbouring desires of some form of retribution since their withdrawal from court, matters came to a head when the news arrived of Alba's arrest of the nobles Lamoral, Count of Egmont and Philip de Montmorency, Count of Horn on 9 September. At the same time, news arrived that the Swiss mercenaries had crossed the border into France. Two Protestant synods were sitting during the receiving of this information, one at Châtillon-sur-Loing and the other at Valery. The mood in these turned sour upon receipt, with the attendees claiming proof of an international conspiracy against their religion. The synods decided on a coup, as a course of action.

=== Nobles assemble ===
A more directly conspiratorial meeting was thus held, at Coligny's chateau. In attendance were the three Coligny brothers, Condé, François III de La Rochefoucauld, Charles de Téligny and Gabriel de Lorges, Count of Montgomery among others. This conference lasted a week as the nobles debated how to proceed, with Coligny championing the party of caution, while François de Coligny d'Andelot led the war party with most of the other attendees. Eventually it was agreed Huguenots in every bailage and Senechaussee to be asked by their deacons to raise money to pay for German reiters, which would be hired by their allies in Germany. Further, a force of 1,500 horse would be assembled, to kidnap the king and queen mother at Meaux, and arrest or kill the members of the court who were most opposed to the Huguenots, specifically Charles, Cardinal of Lorraine.

== The surprise ==
=== Conspiracy revealed ===
While the conspiracy was more successfully hidden by its members than the prior Huguenot plot of the Amboise conspiracy, it was not able to go off before it was discovered. As the Huguenots began assembling, news of all their troops swarming the roads to Chatillon and Rozay-en-Brie reached the royal court, which was staying in the Château de Montceaux-en-Brie. A midnight conference was held to determine the course of action, the court having been caught off guard by how close to fruition this plot was. The Swiss were hurriedly summoned from where they were stationed at Château-Thierry 36 km away. Meanwhile, the court's opinion was divided. The party of Hôpital and Montmorency wanted to stay in Meaux and take advantage of the towns fortifications to hold off the Huguenots until they could be crushed or a deal made. The party of Lorraine and Louis Gonzaga, Duke of Nevers counselled immediately making for Paris.

=== Fleeing ===
The court settled ultimately on the Paris option, setting out at 3 am and quickly hurrying towards the fortified capital. Condé, caught off guard by this sudden withdrawal, was able to pursue with only a third of the troops he had intended to assemble but, despite charging three times, the phalanxes of Swiss mercenaries were able to repel them easily and he and Coligny were forced to retire. The court made it into the capital late in the evening, the king exhausted and humiliated from his day's flight.

=== Lorraine and parlay ===
Meanwhile, Lorraine had ultimately settled on a separate course of action from the court, and he fled on a Spanish horse to Reims. The Huguenots, hot on his heels, were able to kill one of his servants and seize his baggage, but he ultimately arrived safely in the city. With the Huguenots still in pursuit of the main force of Swiss, François de Montmorency was sent out by Catherine to try and get them to call off their coup, however this was promptly rejected by the leaders of the rebellion.

== Consequences ==
=== Second war of religion ===
With the failure of their coup, the leadership was in little mood to cut their losses, deciding instead to besiege the king in Paris, hoping to starve him out before he was able to bring the full weight of the crown's army to bear against them. The Protestants' cause was aided by the subsidiary elements of their coup, concurrent risings in many cities that seized control of Nîmes, Montpellier, Orléans, Valence, Auxerre and Mâcon. Initially the siege went well for the besiegers, and Soissons and Dreux fell to their forces. However, throughout this period Montmorency supplemented his forces in Paris with reinforcements, and in November he broke out, winning a pyrrhic victory against the Protestants at Saint-Denis. Badly stung but not defeated, the Huguenot forces retreated across the border to pick up reinforcements, returning into the country with renewed strength early the next year, laying siege to Chartres. Peace was ultimately made before the siege could reach its conclusion with a reaffirmation of the Edict of Amboise.

=== Lasting enmities ===
The failed Huguenot coup, the second such coup attempt in seven years, would not be forgotten by either the king or Catholic partisans in Paris. The Huguenots' reputation was now firmly tied to rebellion and seditious behaviour, and as such when false reports of a Huguenot plot to kidnap Charles again in 1572 were maliciously circulated, Catholic partisans would not find it difficult to bring out murderous gangs to commit the St. Bartholomew's Day massacre. Memory of the failed coup likely motivated the king to order the assassination of Gaspard de Coligny and other aristocratic Huguenot leaders, shortly before that massacre began.
