= Gaspard de Saulx =

Marshal of France

- Seigneur de Tavannes
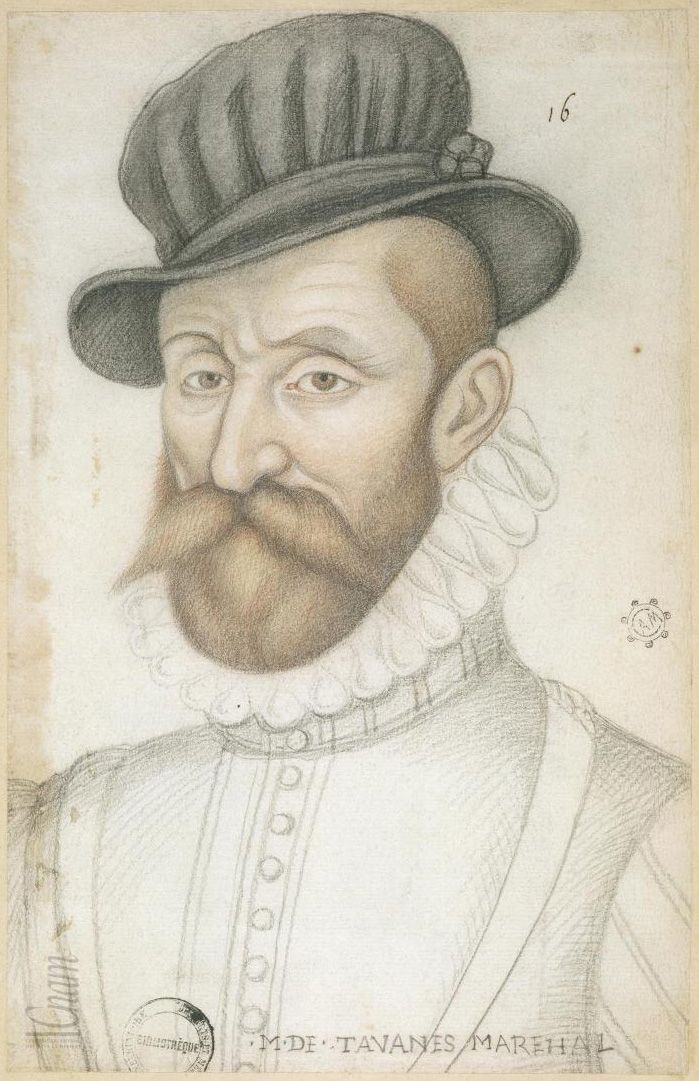
- Other titles: Marshal of France
- Born: March 1509; Dijon, Kingdom of France
- Died: June 1573 (aged 64); Château de Sully, Kingdom of France
- Family: Famille de Saulx
- Spouse: Françoise de la Baume
- Issue: Guillaume de Saulx
- Father: Jean de Saulx
- Mother: Marguerite de Tavannes

Gaspard de Saulx, sieur de Tavannes (March 1509–June 1573) was a French Roman Catholic military leader during the Italian Wars and the French Wars of Religion. He served under four kings during his career, participating in the Siege of Calais (1558) and leading the royal army to victory in the third civil war at the battles of Jarnac and Moncontour. A strong Catholic, he founded the Confraternity of the Holy Ghost in 1567 which would be a template for other militant Catholic organisations across France. He died in 1573, shortly after the opening assassinations of the Massacre of Saint Bartholomew, which he had helped plan.

== Early life and family ==
The Saulx family was well established in Dijon, Gaspard's great-grandfather having been a judge in the Paris Parlement and a councillor to the Duke of Burgundy. Gaspard was born in 1509 in the house Jean de Saulx had commissioned in 1412. He was the son of Jean de Saulx, baron of Sully, and of Marguerite de Tavannes; their second child of three. In 1546 he married Françoise de la Baume for a dowry of 20,000 livres. They would have five children, among whom Guillaume de Saulx (1553-1633), who would inherit his father's titles.

== Reign of Francis I ==
As a page of King Francis I, he was captured after the disaster at the Battle of Pavia in 1525. Later he distinguished himself in the War of Provence and in 1544 at the Battle of Ceresole. In the factionalism between Anne de Pisseleu and Diane de Poitiers at court, Tavannes fell in with the group around the king's mistress.

== Reign of Henri II ==
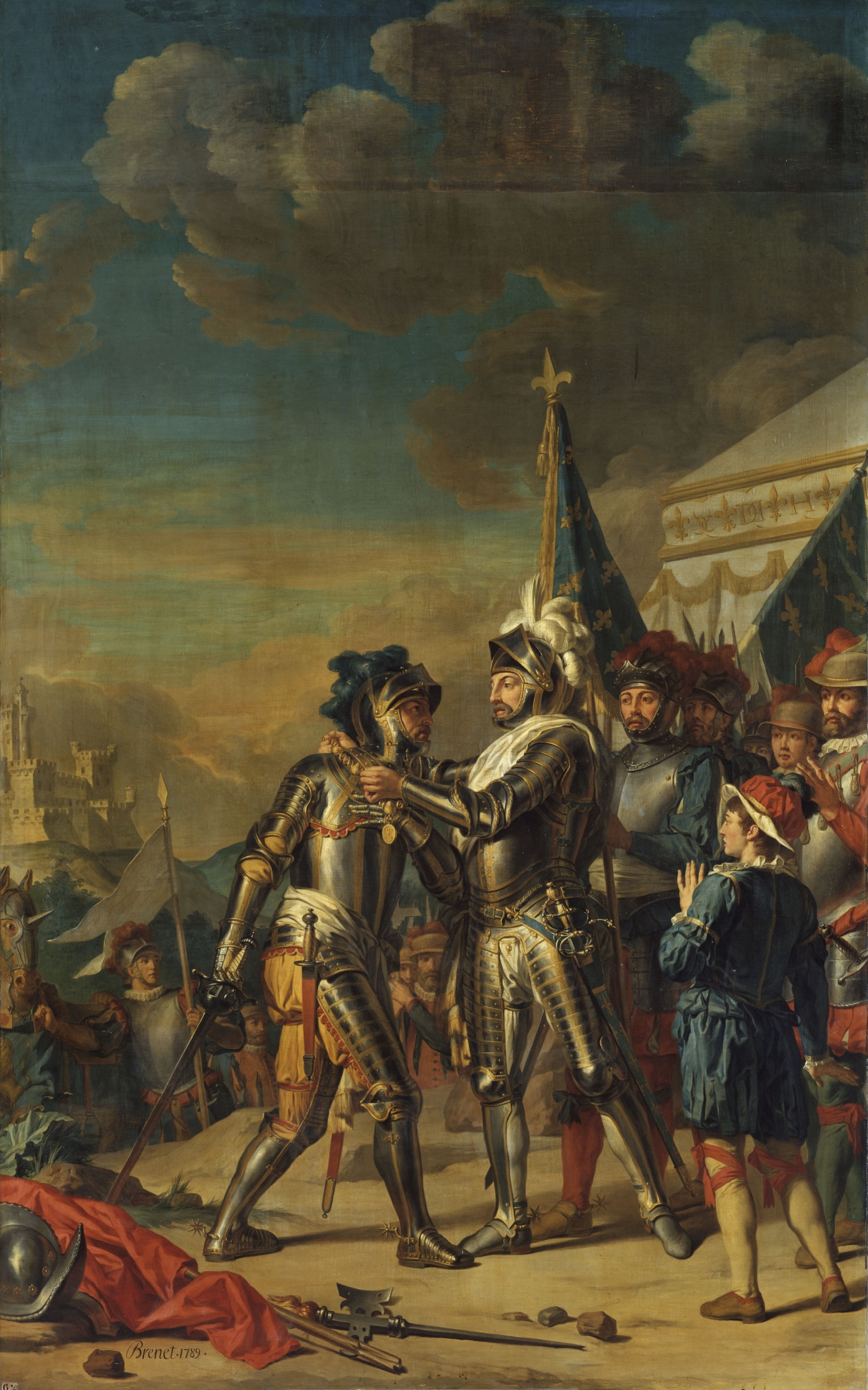
Tavannes presented with the Order of Saint Michael on the field of Renty by the king, Henry II.

In 1552 he supported the Duke of Guise in the defence of Metz and had an important role in the 1554 French victory at the Battle of Renty. Subsequently, he was appointed as Lieutenant General of Burgundy in 1556, making him second in command to Claude, Duke of Aumale. In Aumale's absence he could govern with the full capacity of the governor, an eventuality which occurred regularly. He again supported Guise at the capture of Calais in 1558. When the Peace of Cateau-Cambrésis brought an end to the Italian Wars in 1559, Tavannes was among those angrily denouncing it as a betrayal of the conquests he and other leading nobles had accomplished in the prior years.

At the joust to commemorate the end of the war, Henri insisted on participating, as was often the case. Tavannes and Montmorency acted as judges adjudicating the joust between Henri and Montgommery. The joust would go awry with Montgommery accidentally mortally wounding the king. Tavannes and Montmorency rushed onto the field to offer their assistance and removed Henri's mask to expose his bloody face with splinters embedded deep into it.

== Reign of Francis II ==
In the wake of the Conspiracy of Amboise, Tavannes was deputised by the Guise regime to clear the Dauphiné region of straggler conspirators, who had not made it to Amboise; to that end, he was issued with blank lettres de cachet.

== Reign of Charles IX ==
In his role as lieutenant-governor of Burgundy, he prosecuted the Protestant population harshly, an action for which he was cautioned by Catherine de' Medici in 1561, who urged him to have patience. With the publication of the Edict of Saint-Germain in January 1562, he allied with the mayor of Dijon in opposing it, and the Parlement of Dijon refused to register the edict.

=== First war ===
He served the crown loyally during the civil wars that broke out after the Massacre of Wassy. In the spring of 1562, he prepared to attack Mâcon, requesting a militia be raised by Dijon for the purposes of reconquest. Having seized the city, Beza would claim Tavannes enriched himself to the sum of 60,000 livres in the looting that followed. Alongside the capture of Mâcon he would foil attempted coups in Dijon and Chalons. In May he summoned all Protestant preachers in Dijon to assemble outside the Hôtel de Ville so that they might be sent elsewhere, with the penalty of death for any who failed to attend. To support his military efforts in recapturing Chalons after it was seized by the baron des Adresse several thousand mercenaries would be hired from Switzerland and Germany.

With peace declared in 1563, Catherine would write to him as she had in 1561, urging him to restrain the vindictive urge of the Dijon Parlement to punish Protestants and allow them to practice freely in accordance with the Edict of Amboise. The queen mother would ultimately draw close to Tavannes, seeing him and Marshal Vielleville as useful counterweights to the Guise and Montmorency factions at court. In 1564 with the royal court on tour of France, Tavannes staged a grand welcome for them in Dijon, throwing a large military parade.

=== Second war ===
After the victory at the battle of Saint Denis Tavannes and Guise monitored the border, hoping both to prevent reiters coming to Condé's aid, and to achieve juncture with the Comte de Manfeldt; the crossing of 6000 reiters thwarted their plans and forced them to retire from the border. In 1568, after the conclusion of the second war with the Peace of Longjumeau he established a Confraternity of the Holy Ghost in Dijon, a violation of the edict's terms. The purpose of the league was to raise funds and prepare arms in the eventuality of conflict breaking out again. The success of the confraternity in bringing about abjurations in Dijon led to imitation orders being founded across Burgundy, such as in Autun and Chalon-sur-Saône. During the short peace Catherine implored Tavannes to enforce the terms of the edict in his territory.

=== Third war ===
With the peace collapsing and the Protestant nobles moving into opposition, Tavannes allowed his correspondence on the matter to be intercepted by their agents, alerting them to the fact they were due to be arrested. Whilst he opposed them politically he felt the planned arrest was a dishonourable method, the warning provided allowed them to flee south to La Rochelle and take up arms. During the third civil war he led the crown to victory at the battles of Jarnac and Moncontour commanding armies under the nominal leadership of Anjou. In the wake of the latter victory Tavannes and Cossé counselled the king to make peace while he had the advantage, but the government instead set about a siege of Saint-Jean-d'Angély. The siege would prove a disaster for the royal army, destroyed by disease and lack of pay. As a reward for his service, and compensation for being dispossessed of his lieutenant-governorship in Dijon, he was made Marshal of France on 28 November 1570. He was also granted a royal pension from Anjou.

=== Saint Bartholomew's Day Massacre ===
In the uneasy peace that followed the third war, Tavannes was opposed to the plans of Coligny to reunite the kingdom through an invasion of the Spanish Netherlands. When Nassau crossed the border in May 1572 and Coligny urged the king to seize the moment, he was one of the figures selected to compose a memoranda against the idea. As one of Catherine's chief confidants and a member of the Conseil Privé he was intimately involved in the meetings that took place after the attempted assassination of Admiral Coligny in which the decision to liquidate the senior Protestant leadership was taken. According to the memoirs written much later by his son, he had argued for the life of Navarre and Condé during the meeting; however, the fact the memoirs were written during Navarre's reign as king makes this hard to take at face value. In October the same year he was appointed as governor of Provence and Admiral of the Levant. He traded the governorship of Provence to Albert de Gondi on condition that Gondi hand over Metz to his son.

=== Death ===
He died in his castle at Sully, and was buried in the Sainte Chapelle of Dijon. His memoirs, edited and published by his son around 1620, are an important primary source for the period.

== Sources ==
- Baumgartner, Frederic (1988). Henry II: King of France 1547-1559. Duke University Press.
- Estebe, Janine (1968). Tocsin pour une Massacre: La Saison des Saint-Barthélemy. Éditions du Centurion.
- Forster, Robert (1994). House of Saulx-Tavanes: Versailles and Burgundy, 1700–1830. Johns Hopkins University Press. ISBN 0-8018-1247-X.
- Harding, Robert (1978). Anatomy of a Power Elite: the Provincial Governors in Early Modern France. Yale University Press.
- Holt, Mack P. (2005). The French Wars of Religion, 1562-1629. Cambridge University Press.
- Holt, Mack (2020). The Politics of Wine in Early Modern France: Religion and Popular Culture in Burgundy 1477-1630. Cambridge University Press.
- Jouanna, Arlette (2007). The St Bartholomew's Day Massacre: The Mysteries of a Crime of State. Manchester University Press.
- Knecht, Robert (1998). Catherine de' Medici. Routledge.
- Knecht, R. J. (1998). Catherine de' Medici. London and New York: Longman. ISBN 9781138159075.
- Oman, Charles (1937). A History of the Art of War in the Sixteenth Century. London: Methuen & Co.
- Potter, David (1983). "The Duc de Guise and the Fall of Calais". English Historical Review. 98 388.
- Salmon, J.H.M (1975). Society in Crisis: France during the Sixteenth Century. Metheun & Co.
- Saulx, Jean de, vicomte de Tavannes ([c. 1620]; reprinted 1822). Mémoires de très-noble et très-illustre Gaspard de Saulx, seigneur de Tavannes, mareschal de France, admiral des mers de Levant, gouverneur de Provence, conseiller du roy, et capitaine de cent hommes d'armes, reprinted in Collection complèt̀e des méḿoires relatifs à ̀l'histoire de France, edited by M. Petitot. Paris: Foucault. Vols. 23, 24, & 25. OCLC 39499947.
- Thompson, James (1909). The Wars of Religion in France 1559-1576: The Huguenots, Catherine de Medici and Philip II. Chicago University Press.
- Wood, James (2002). The Kings Army: Warfare, Soldiers and Society during the Wars of Religion in France, 1562-1576. Cambridge University Press.
