= Charles de Téligny =

French soldier and diplomat

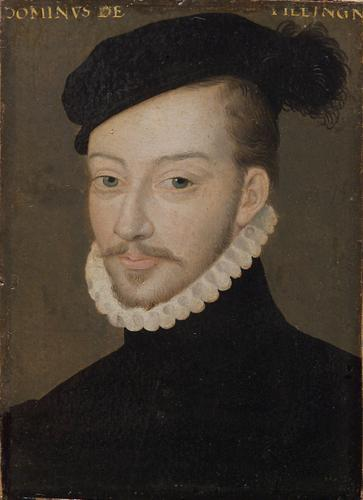
Charles de Téligny Portrait

Charles de Téligny (French pronunciation: [ʃaʁl də teliɲi]; c. 1535 – 24 August 1572) was a French soldier and diplomat.

== Biography ==
De Téligny belonged to a respected Huguenot family of Rouergue, and received an excellent training in letters and arms at the house of Gaspard de Coligny.

He was employed on several peace missions; he represented the Protestants before the king, and was entrusted by Condé with the presentation of his terms to the queen-mother Catherine in 1567, and in the following year he assisted at the conference at Châlons and signed the Peace of Longjumeau, which was destined to be of short duration.

On the outbreak of war, he took part in the siege of Poitiers, directed an unsuccessful attack on Nantes, fought bravely under Coligny at Moncontour, and participated in the negotiations ending in the Peace of Saint-Germain-en-Laye (8 August 1570).

In 1571 he retired to La Rochelle and married Louise de Coligny, but was speedily recalled to Paris to serve on the bi-partisan commission of adjustment. Although he won the special favour of Charles IX, he became one of the first victims in the massacre of St Bartholomew's Day. He was murdered in the halls of the Louvre after refusing to recant his Protestant beliefs. His remains were taken to the Castle of Téligny in 1617, but eight years later were thrown into the river by the Bishop of Castres.
