= Battle of Saint-Denis (1567) =

1567 battle

- Part of the French Wars of Religion
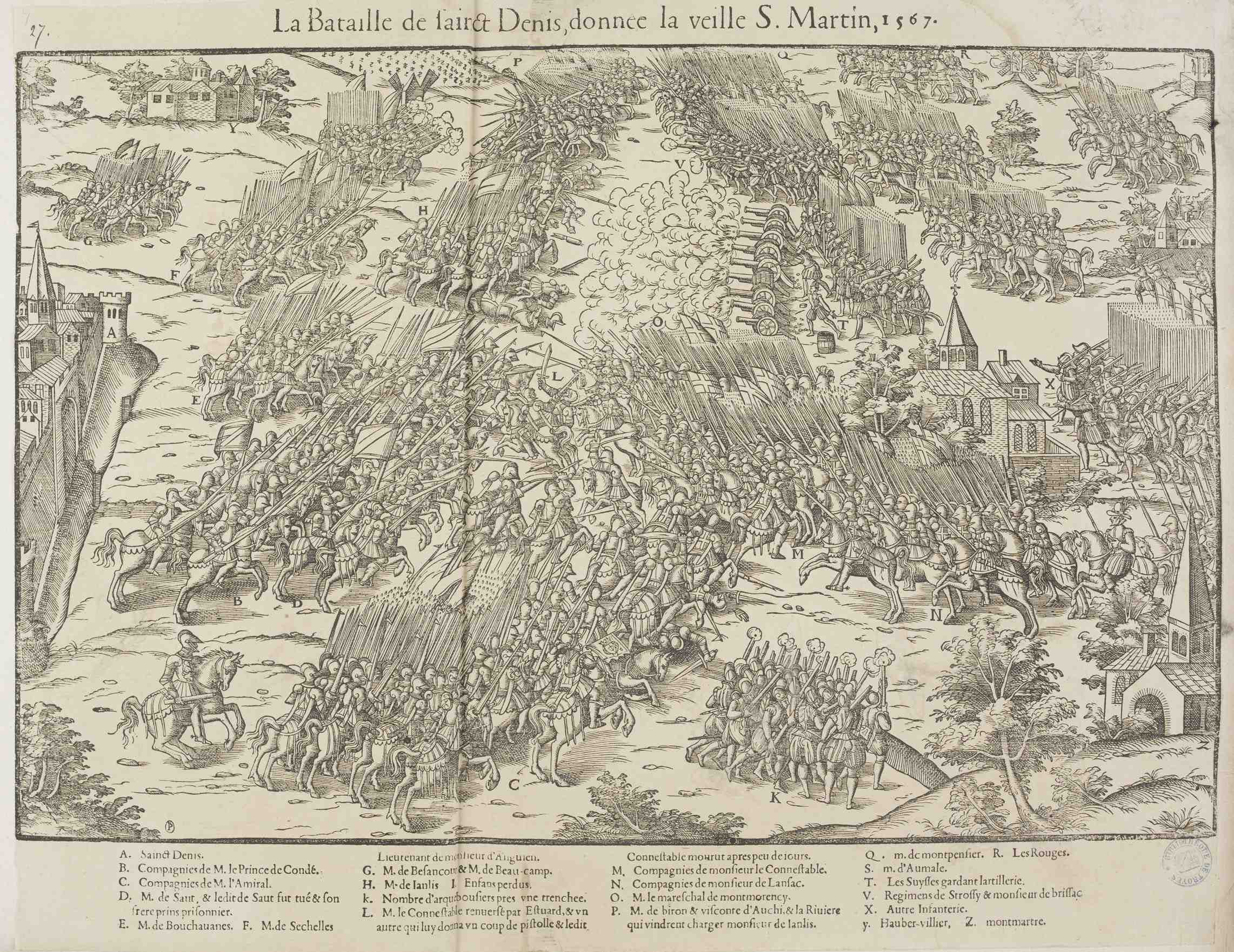
- Image by Jean Perrissin and Jacques Tortorel of the battle in progress
Date	10 November 1567
Location	Saint-Denis, France 48.5608°N 2.2114°E
Result	Royalist victory

Belligerents
French Huguenot forces	Royalists

Commanders and leaders
Louis I de Bourbon, prince de Condé	Anne de Montmorency (DOW)

Strength
2,700	13,000

Casualties and losses
300–400	300–400

The Battle of Saint-Denis was fought on 10 November 1567 between a royalist army and Huguenot rebels during the second of the French Wars of Religion. Although their 74 year old commander, Anne de Montmorency, was killed in the fighting, the royalists forced the rebels to withdraw, allowing them to claim victory.

The only major conflict of the second phase came about when Montmorency attempted to break Louis, Prince of Condé's siege of Paris. The Huguenot army retreated towards the border, where they linked up with forces led by their ally John Casimir of the Palatinate-Simmern, before besieging Chartres in February 1568. The war ended shortly thereafter.

== Prelude to battle ==
=== Paris invested ===
After the failure of the Protestants to capture the king in the Surprise of Meaux, Charles IX and the Catherine de' Medici rushed to Paris. Keen not to waste his mobilisation advantage, Conde made camp at Saint-Denis on 2 October, hoping to quickly starve the capital out before the full royal army could mobilise. Simultaneous risings across France in Orléans, Nîmes and Montpellier aided the Protestant cause. Condé seized first Charenton-le-Pont, a strategic town in the suburbs of Paris that supplied the city with its grain and flour. Lagny-sur-Marne, Argenteuil and Aubervilliers also fell to his forces, leaving Paris surrounded. Further afield Montereau, Étampes and Dreux were seized, each of which controlled important roads towards the capital.

Windmills were burned by the Huguenots in the Faubourgs of Paris, while many churches were looted of their valuables, further alienating the population of the city from their cause. Merchants were subject to forced loans, while peasants were conscripted into Corvée labour for the besieging army. Meanwhile, the city of Paris offered up 400,000 écus for the kings cause, and the clergy a further 250,000 for the defeat of the Huguenots.

=== Negotiation stalling ===
Conscious of their precarious situation, the crown sent out the moderate Michel de l'Hôpital, Chancellor, François de Scépeaux, Marshal Vielleville and Jean de Morvilliers to negotiate, as a method of buying time for the crown's army to assemble. Conde, feeling confident, set out aggressive demands asking for the expulsion of Italian financiers, the repeal of all taxes created since Louis XII, the free exercise of religion regardless of station, the calling of an Estates General and four fortified towns to be given to them, as surety. While these negotiations were ongoing, Emmanuel Philibert, Duke of Savoy was sending recruits north, the main body under Filippo di Piero Strozzi travelling north via Piedmont with Gaspard II de Coligny and La Noue trying to intercept. Pope Pius V also sent troops up north; meanwhile, the Protestant hope that their religious Swiss brethren could be persuaded to switch sides fell flat, as the 6,000 Swiss troops remained loyal to the crown.

On 8 October, the crown offered pardon to the rebels if they would lay down their arms. Condé was however only increasing in confidence, with the capture of Soissons and Orléans by La Noue and expanded his demands to include Calais Boulogne and Metz as their surety towns, that one church in every bonne ville be handed over to the Huguenots, and that his troops be paid to lay down their arms. The tide however was already beginning to turn against the Huguenots, with the Constable being made Lieutenant-General of the army to consolidate military opposition to him, Brissac raising 20 companies in Paris to form the core of his force. On 6 November Strozzi destroyed one of the boat bridges Condé was utilising to cut off Paris, the following day Jacques de Savoie, Duke of Nemours captured another Parisian bridge.

Misjudging his position, Condé weakened his besieging forces further by sending François de Coligny d'Andelot to take Poissy and Gabriel de Lorges, Count of Montgomery to seize Pontoise, the former leaving him 800 arquebusiers and 500 horse shorter. On 9 November Condé was forced to abandon Charenton setting fire to it as he departed. It was now that Montmorency, who had slowly been building struck.

== Battle ==
On 10 November battle was joined between the forces under Condé and the forces of Montmorency. Condé had at his disposal 1,200 foot and 1,500 horse, with no artillery. Montmorency by contrast, boasted 10,000 foot, of which 6,000 was drawn from the Swiss guard, and 3,000 horse, with 18 artillery pieces. Coligny commanded Condé's right flank, around the town of Saint-Ouen while Genlis held his left near Aubervilliers. Facing them Montmorency led the main body, while his son Marshal Montmorency commanded the Swiss. The battle began at 15:00 with an attack up the hill by Condé; the Marshal was met with quick success and his experienced Swiss troops tore into the Huguenot lines. The Parisian levies under the command of Montmorency were however far weaker, and Condé was able to break the line with his cavalry, exposing Montmorency's position.

Robert Stuart approached Montmorency, and fired two bullets into his back, fatally wounding the Constable. By this point Condé's horse had been shot out from under him, and he had to be carried off the field, allowing time for Montmorency to be withdrawn from the fray, his wounded body dispatched to Paris where he would die on 12 November. The stronger remnants of Montmorency's army under his son would however hold the field, and, thus although both sides would take similar casualties of around 300-400 men, the battle would be won for the crown.

== Fighting continues and the war ends ==
On 14 November Conde withdrew from Saint Denis. Conscious of his critical position, but granted breathing room by the death of his opposing commander, he sought to make his way to link up with the forces under John Casimir. He travelled first to Melun in the south, where he linked up with the forces under François III de La Rochefoucauld. This accomplished he headed towards Troyes, pursued by an army under the Duke of Nevers where John Casimir's forces were, the young Henry I, Duke of Guise in Champagne failing to stop the link up. The royal army was now under the command of the king's brother, Henry III of France, Duke of Anjou, who was made Lieutenant-General of the army, with Charles de Cossé, Count of Brissac, and Louis, Duke of Montpensier as his deputies. He narrowly missed a chance to bring the Huguenots to battle at Notre-Dame-d'Épine.

Condé now completed the final consolidation of his army with the addition of forces of the Viscounts of Quercy and Rouergue, who were fresh off relieving the weak royal siege of Orléans. Together the army resolved to siege and sack Chartres. The siege would go poorly for the Huguenots, with the defenders reinforced at the last minute to such a degree as making their numbers fairly insufficient, especially when combined with the poor placement of the limited cannons Condé now possessed. The war would however be concluded by a truce and then peace, declared on 13 March.
