= Battle of La Roche-l'Abeille =

1569 battle

Date	25 June 1569
Location	La Roche-l'Abeille, (Haute-Vienne) France
Result	Huguenot victory

Belligerents
Catholics	French Huguenot forces

Commanders and leaders
Henry of Anjou	Gaspard II de Coligny

Strength
29,500	25,000

Casualties and losses
500	?

The Battle of La Roche-l'Abeille occurred on 25 June 1569 between the Catholic forces of King Charles IX of France commanded by the Duke d’Anjou and the Huguenots commanded by the Admiral Gaspard II de Coligny during the third war (1568–1570) of the French Wars of Religion.

== Background ==
The Third War of Religion saw an uprising of the Protestants and the creation of an army under the command of Louis I de Bourbon, prince de Condé. This army had laid siege to several cities in the Poitou region, and then Angoulême and Cognac. At the Battle of Jarnac (16 March 1569), the Prince de Condé was killed, forcing Admiral de Coligny to take command.

In order to attack the royal army, Coligny directed the Protestant army toward the Limousin region, hoping thus to regroup with 14,000 mercenaries being led by Wolfgang, Count Palatine of Zweibrücken, Duke of Zweibrücken (French: duc des Deux-Ponts) and financed by Queen Elizabeth I of England. After a brief fight with a detachment of the royal army, the Duke of Zweibrücken was able to cross the Vienne at Aixe, but died on 11 June at Nexon. The Protestant army and the Duke of Zweibrücken's mercenaries were able to regroup at Châlus, for a total of 25,000 men.

The royal army of 29,500 troops, led by the Duke d’Anjou (the future Henry III), was stationed before Saint-Yrieix to protect the city.

== Battle ==
The Protestant army surprised the royal troops, and this gave them the initial advantage. The colonel-general of the royal infantry, Philippe Strozzi, was, however, able to temporarily save the situation before an attack by Coligny – threatening to encircle the army – forced the royal troops to retreat before the Protestants.

== Aftermath ==
Coligny's victory was far from being decisive, but it allowed him to open a route toward the Périgord region. The Protestant army took few prisoners, the most famous being the colonel-general Filippo di Piero Strozzi.

In the days that followed, the Protestant army massacred hundreds of people throughout the Limousin and Périgord regions, including 500 infantry men at La Roche-l'Abeille and 250 peasants at La Chapelle-Faucher, as retribution for the death of Condé and Paulon de Mauvans.

In autumn the same year, the Battle of Moncontour (30 October 1569) would see the Huguenots defeated and Catholic forces participating in similar massacres against the defeated.

== Notes ==
- This article is based in part on a translation of the article Bataille de La Roche-l'Abeille from the French Wikipedia on 14 March 2007.

== See also ==
- French Wars of Religion
- Agrippa d'Aubigné, participated in the battle

== Bibliography ==
- Jouanna, Arlette; Jacqueline Boucher, Dominique Biloghi, Guy Thiec. Histoire et dictionnaire des Guerres de religion. Collection: Bouquins. Paris: Laffont, 1998. ISBN 2-221-07425-4
