= Edict of Amboise =

1563 armistice in the French Wars of Religion

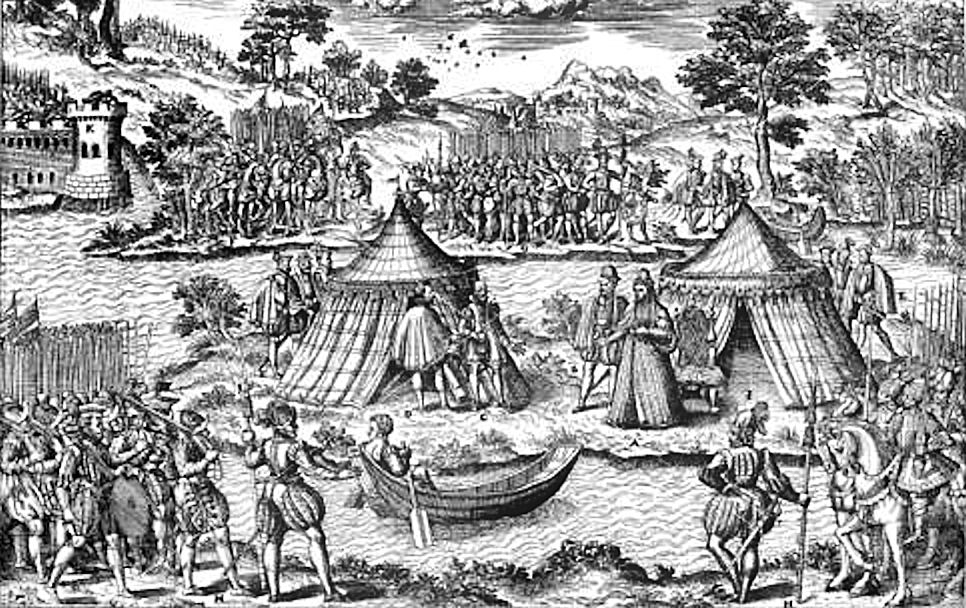
- Peace negotiations at Amboise, 17th century engraving
- Signed: 19 March 1563
- Location: Château of Amboise
- Negotiators: Catherine de' Medici; Anne de Montmorency; Condé
- Original signatories: Catherine de' Medici
- Parties: Crown; Protestant rebels
- Languages: French

The Edict of Amboise, also known as the Edict of Pacification, was signed at the Château of Amboise on 19 March 1563 by Catherine de' Medici, acting as regent for her son King Charles IX of France. The Edict ended the first war of the French Wars of Religion, inaugurating a period of official peace in France by guaranteeing the Huguenots religious privileges and freedoms. However, it was gradually undermined by continuing religious violence at a regional level and hostilities renewed in 1567.

== Background ==
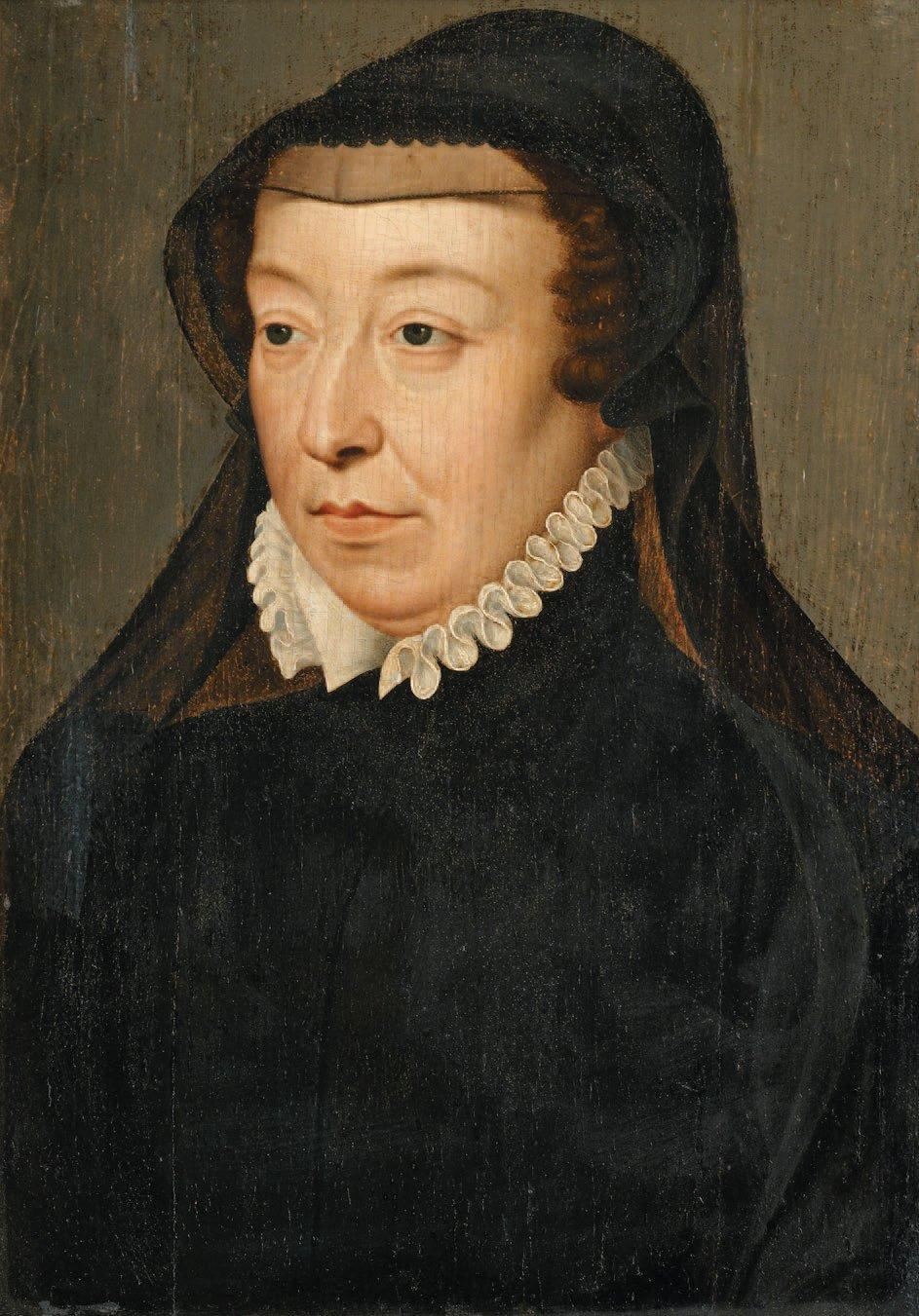
The Queen Mother Catherine de' Medici, c. 1560, who favoured compromise with the Huguenots minority

Hoping to resolve the increasingly bitter conflict between French Huguenots and Catholics, in January 1562 Catherine de' Medici issued the Edict of January allowing limited toleration to Protestants. This was immediately denounced by those Catholics who opposed such concessions, led by François, Duke of Guise, who in March oversaw the killing of Protestant worshippers in the Massacre of Vassy, often considered the starting point of the French War of Religion.

On 2 April, Orléans was seized by a Huguenot force under Condé, as well as a number of other towns, including Tours, Lyon and Rouen. The two sides held peace talks over the period 18 to 28 May but these failed, since Condé insisted Guise be removed from court, a demand the Crown could not accept. Anne de Montmorency, the Constable of France, continued negotiations on behalf of the Crown but his terms were also unacceptable; they included a ban on Protestant preachers and the exile of Condé and other Protestant leaders until Charles IX of France reached his majority.

Catholic success in retaking areas seized by the Huguenots meant prospects for a negotiated peace dwindled and fresh attempts to negotiate terms as Condé approached Paris in November 1562 were largely a delaying tactic until reinforcements could arrive. Shortly afterwards, King Antoine of Navarre died at Rouen, while Saint André was killed at Dreux in December and Montmorency taken prisoner. The loss of these senior Catholic leaders allowed Guise to take control of the Royal war effort, while the capture of Condé at Dreux led him to believe he could crush the opposition and achieve total victory by taking Orléans.

The assassination of Guise in February 1563 during the siege of Orléans removed a major obstacle to a negotiated peace, while the demoralised Royal army was unable to press its advantage. Shortly after this, Catherine travelled to Orléans and on 8 March she negotiated the release of Condé and Montmorency by their respective captors. Under her supervision, the two men met on the nearby Île aux Bœufs to discuss peace terms, and on 19 March, the Edict of Amboise was approved by the Conseil du Roi. Unlike subsequent edicts, which were marked with green wax to indicate they were intended to be permanent, the Edict of Amboise was sealed with yellow wax, denoting it as only temporary and undermining Protestant trust in its provisions.

== Terms ==
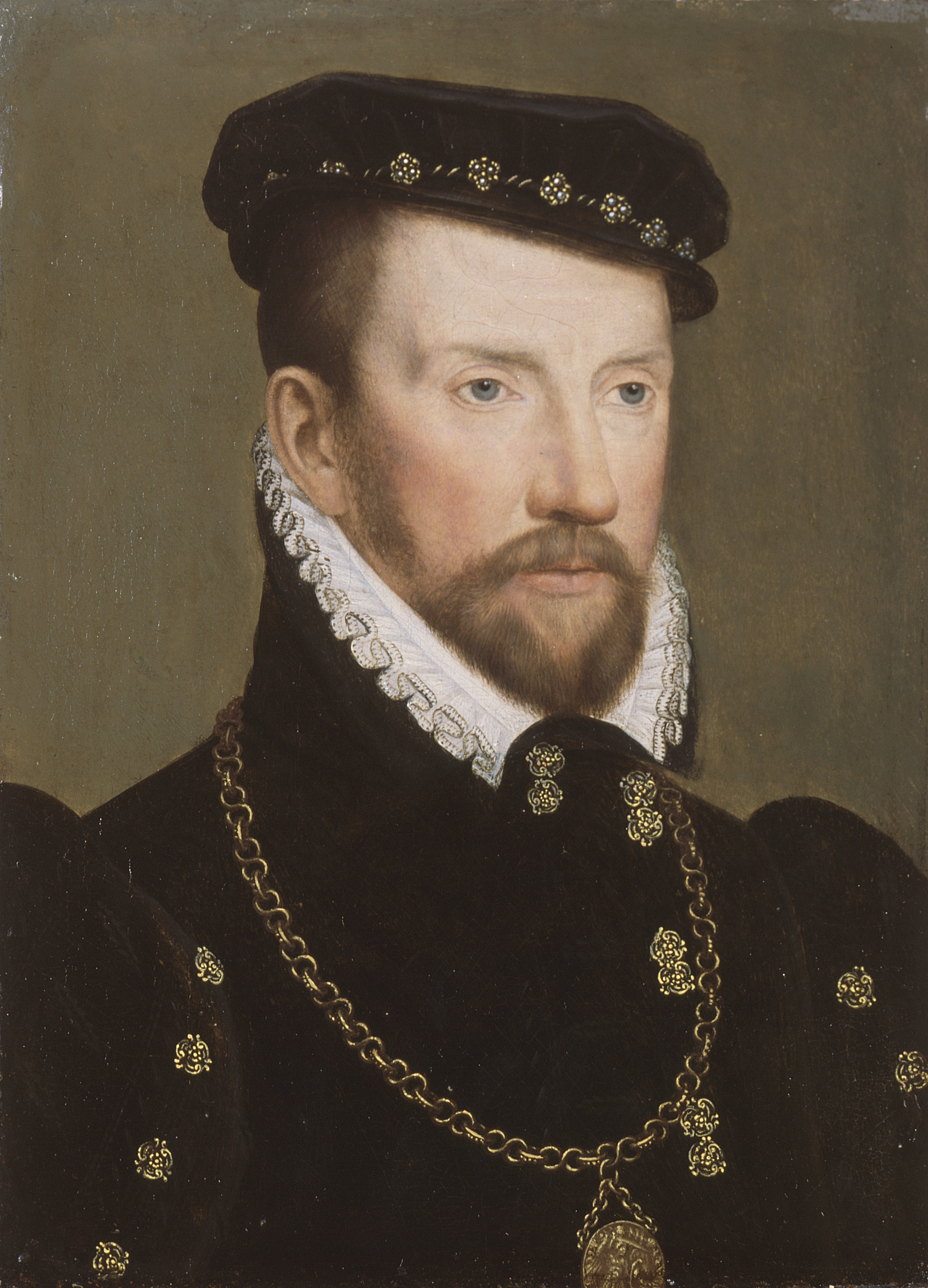
Huguenot leader Gaspard II de Coligny, one of those who felt it better to continue fighting than accept the restricted terms of the Edict

The agreement was modelled on the previous Edict of January, though with greater restrictions. Although it allowed liberty of conscience and the right for Huguenots to practise their religion in private, communal Calvinist worship was restricted to the suburbs of one town in each baillage or sénéchausée in general. Exemptions included towns held by Protestants prior to 7 March, which were allowed freedom of worship, as well higher rank Protestant nobles, who could hold services in their feudal holdings. Lower rank gentry were given the same rights but only for their immediate family members and servants. Despite the baillage provision, Protestant worship was banned in Paris.

Any property of the Catholic church seized during the war was to be returned, with reciprocal arrangements for Huguenots deprived of offices and goods, including those who lived in Paris, a provision largely designed for the benefit of Condé. The government agreed to pay accrued wages for the Huguenot army provided it left the country and discharged Condé from reimbursing revenues gained from levying taxes during the civil war. Finally all political and religious leagues were banned along with armed assemblies. The Edict also granted a general amnesty for crimes committed during the war, a provision that came into force only after the hastily scheduled execution of Jean de Poltrot, alleged assassin of Guise. (Note: Wounded by Poltrot, Guise died six days later, largely as a result of his surgeons constantly bleeding him.) Seeking to cause conflict over such disputes was forbidden and perpetrators could be sentenced without a trial.

A series of amendments were passed on 22 December; freedom of worship for upper Protestant nobility on their own estates excluded lands purchased from the Catholic church, while those with multiple residences could do so when they moved between them. Governors could nominate baillage suburbs, with or without the aid of commissioners, while Protestant worship could only continue in towns occupied prior to 7 March if still in their possession at the end of the war and could not be re-introduced in towns they had lost. Protestant Parisians could not travel out of the area to worship and would have to move out of the region if they wanted to do so. Burials were to occur at mutually agreed sites outside the city walls and to prevent conflict, funeral corteges could have no more than 30 members.

However, significant elements on both sides viewed the Edict as unsatisfactory and preferred to continue fighting. The Guise party argued too many concessions had been made, while the Huguenot faction known as the "Party of the Pastors", whose members included Coligny and theologians like Theodor Beza, felt they did not go nearly far enough and largely favoured the Protestant nobility led by Condé.

== Registration and enforcement ==
Since many on both sides opposed the Edict, ensuring acceptance became a major issue, while solutions included Charles IX's grand tour of France, which began in 1564 and lasted two years. Organised by Catherine de' Medici, it travelled around France in a clockwise direction, covering three separate Parlements and many other cities, hearing petitions and chastising those held responsible for failing to uphold its provisions. Ultimately, the Crown resorted to holding lits de justice, a legal device used to impose the Edict on the individual Parlements and previously used only within the Parlement de Paris. Even this arbitrary device failed to secure adherence at a local level, as in Tours where Protestants were denied the site of worship given to them by the edict, or in Romans-sur-Isère where they refused to reinstate the Mass.

More immediate problems included the need to demobilise the Protestant mercenaries, with the unpaid troops marauding and plundering Champagne unhindered for many weeks, until expelled with the help of regular troops from Metz. It also proved almost impossible to enforce the ban on political and religious groups, with little attempt to stop the upsurge in Catholic leagues that formed subsequently to the peace. Examples include the "Confraternities of the Holy Ghost" established in Languedoc by Blaise de Montluc and Tavannes in Burgundy.

=== Registration ===
For the Edict to be legal, it first had to be registered by the regional Parlements, most of whom opposed the clauses relating to the toleration of the Huguenots.

- The largest and most important was the Parlement de Paris, which covered a territory considerably larger than the city itself and close to half of France (see Map). Although Louis, Duke of Montpensier and Charles de Bourbon were made responsible for ensuring registration, it resisted before registering a modified version on 27 March, with the proviso that it would have limited authority until Charles came of age. While in Rouen in August 1563, Charles declared his majority, thus voiding these conditions.

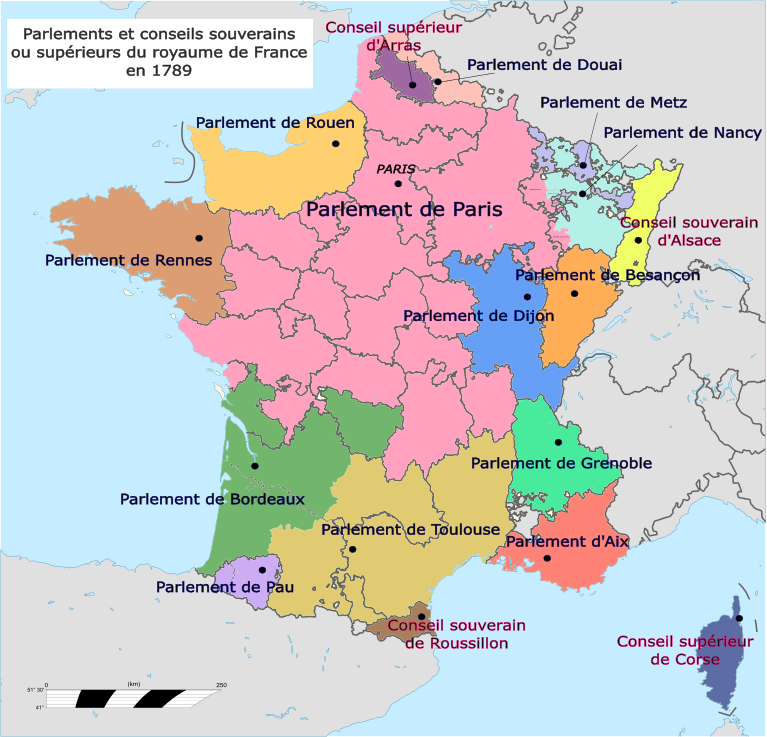
Distribution of individual Parlements 1789; Besançon, Metz, Nancy, Douai, Pau and Rousillon were added in the 17th century

- The Parlement de Normandie, or Parlement de Rouen, strongly resisted efforts by Brissac to enforce registration, and the local administration, the Council of 24 asked for exemption from its provisions. When this was denied, Parlement passed their own law voiding key parts of the Edict, which was only registered after the murder in late April of several Protestants seeking to return to the city.
- The Parlement de Dijon proved more stubborn still, dispatching a commission to court to lodge their protest, followed by a remonstrance to the King in May. Although registered under duress on 19 June, an additional clause effectively negated their action and it was only properly registered in May 1564 when Charles issued a lit de justice during his royal tour.
- Registration was forced through the Parlement de Bordeaux by its President Jacques-Benôit Lagebaton, who was subsequently hounded from office for his decision. Both Bordeaux and the Parlement de Toulouse passed amended versions of the Edict, forcing Charles to issued both with a lit de justice.
- The Parlement d'Aix refused to acknowledge receipt of the edict for a year, forcing the King to replace its most recalcitrant members in November 1564. Replacing them with selected judges from Paris did not resolve the issue and further Catholic resistance in the region continued.
- The only Parlements prepared to register the Edict without compulsion were those of Grenoble, an area dominated by Huguenots, and Rennes, which had been reinstated only in 1554 and was more susceptible to Royal influence. Both issued statements urging the different faiths to unite and uphold royal edicts.

=== Enforcement ===
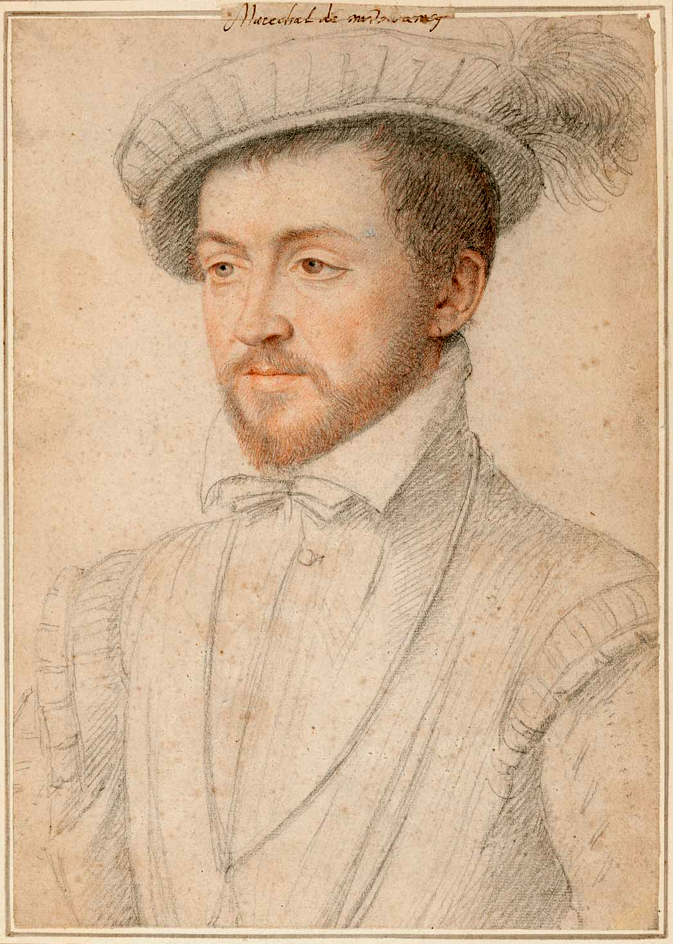
François de Montmorency, one of three Marshalls charged with helping enforce the Edict in the provinces

Even when coerced into registration, many Parlements proved unwilling to enforce the legislation they had just passed. To oversee the process, thirty commissioners with broad judicial and executive powers were sent into the provinces to hear petitions and complaints from the residents of their assigned localities. In areas such as Lyon, they also had to compel lower courts to register the Edict, while some faced opposition from Catholic regional military governors, such as Charles de Montmorency-Damville in the Île-de-France and Gaspard de Saulx in Burgundy. Its vagueness on several key issues allowed the commissioners to adapt the terms to fit local needs, such as legislation on whether Protestants must decorate their houses for Catholic ceremonies.

To assist enforcement, senior military officers were deputised to cover different regions. Marshall François de Montmorency was given the Île-de-France, Picardy, Normandy, Berry and Orléans, proceeding first to Picardy to ensure recognition of the King's majority. Marshal François de Scépeaux was assigned Lyonnais, Dauphiné, Provence and Languedoc, starting with the troubled city of Lyon. Finally Marshal Imbert de La Plâtière was assigned the regions of Touraine, Anjou, Maine, Poitou, parts of Brittany and lower Normandy. With such broad remits, they soon found themselves overstretched in their ability to provide backing to the commissioners.

In January 1566, concerns over the number of cases being sent to the Crown for arbitration led to abolition of the commissioner system, which was replaced with "neutral chambers" set up by the regional Parlement.

== Legacy of peace ==
Ultimately the agreement failed to achieve its primary purpose of ending religious divisions and the next war broke out in 1567, caused by Huguenot fears the Edict was about to be revoked and the outbreak of fighting between Spain and Protestant rebels in the Netherlands. More than this though, the Edict was undermined by ongoing popular religious violence in the regional communities, as demonstrated in 1572 by the provincial killings that followed the St. Bartholomew's Day massacre in Paris.

== Sources ==
- Benedict, Philip (2003). Rouen During the Wars of Religion. Cambridge University Press. ISBN 0521547970.
- Carroll, Stuart (2009). Martyrs and Murderers: The Guise Family and the Making of Europe. Oxford University Press. ISBN 978-0199229079.
- Diefendorf, Barbara (1991). Beneath the Cross: Catholics and Huguenots in Sixteenth-Century Paris. Oxford University Press. ISBN 0195070135.
- Foa, Jeremie (2004). "Making Peace: The Commissions for Enforcing the Pacification Edicts in the Reign of Charles IX (1560–1574)". French History. 18 (3): 268–70. doi:10.1093/fh/18.3.256.
- Holt, Mack (2005). The French Wars of Religion, 1562–1629. Cambridge University Press. ISBN 978-0521547505.
- Holt, Mack (2020). The Politics of Wine in Early Modern France. Cambridge University Press. ISBN 978-1108456814.
- Kingdon, Robert (1967). Geneva and the Consolidation of the French Protestant Movement, 1564–1572 : a Contribution to the History of Congregationalism, Presbyterianism and Calvinist Resistance Theory. Libraire Droz Press. ISBN 978-2600030168.
- Knecht, Robert J (1996). The French Wars of Religion 1559–1598. Longman. ISBN 058228533X.
- Nicholls, David (1994). "Protestants, Catholics and Magistrates in Tours 1562–72: The Making of a Catholic City during the Religious Wars". French History. 8: 14–33. doi:10.1093/fh/8.1.14.
- Potter, David (1997). The French Wars of Religion: Selected Documents. Macmillan. ISBN 0312175450.
- Roberts, Penny (2013). Peace and Authority During the French Religious Wars c. 1560–1600. Palgrave Macmillan. ISBN 978-1137326744.
- Roberts, Penny (2007). "The Language of Peace during the French Religious Wars" (PDF). Cultural and Social History. 4 (3): 297–351. doi:10.2752/147800407X219223. S2CID 144713492.
- Salmon, J.H.M (1975). Society in Crisis: France in the Sixteenth Century. Methuen. ISBN 978-0416730500.
- Sutherland, Nicola (1981). "The Assassination of Francois Duc de Guise February 1563". The Historical Journal. 24 (2): 279–295. doi:10.1017/S0018246X00005471. S2CID 159857086.
- Thompson, James (1909). The Wars of Religion in France: The Huguenots, Catherine de Medici and Phillip II. Chicago University Press.
