= Battle of Moncontour =

1569 battle

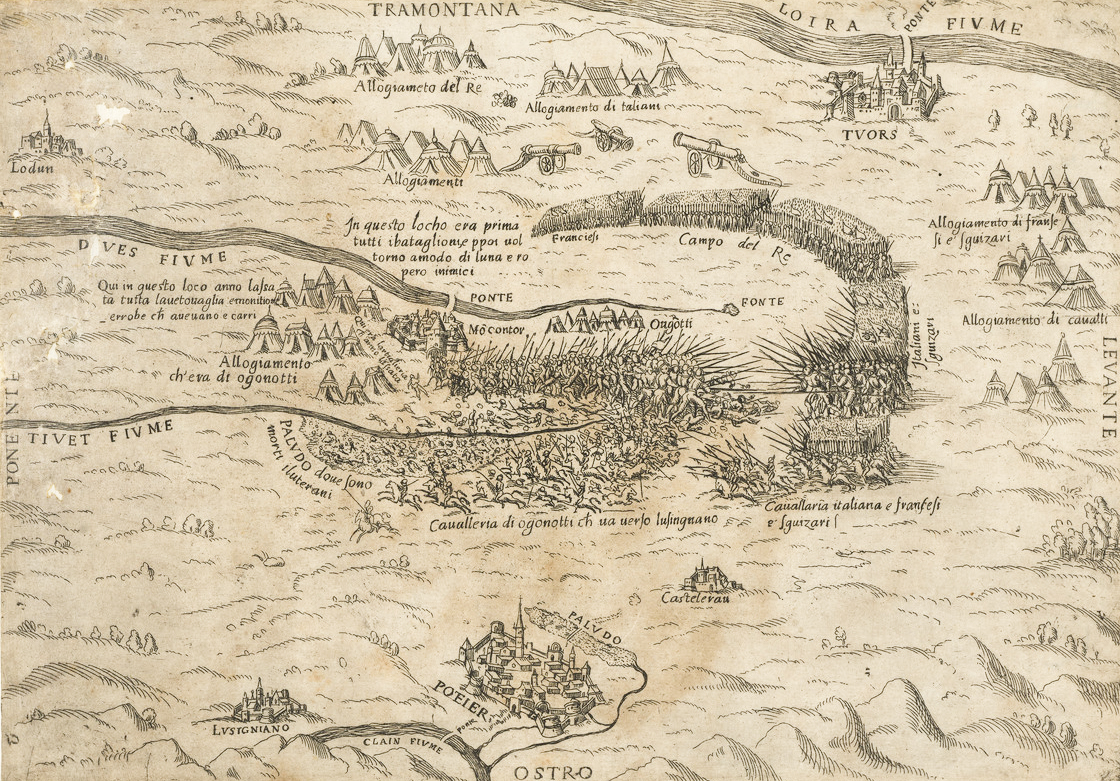
- Battle of Moncontour, 1569.
Date	3 October 1569
Location	Moncontour, Vienne near Poitiers, France
Result	Catholic victory

Belligerents
Catholics	Huguenot forces

Commanders and leaders
Henry Duke of Anjou; Gaspard de Saulx; Louis, Duke of Montpensier; Philibert, Margrave of Baden-Baden	Gaspard II de Coligny; Count Louis of Nassau

Strength
~22,000–25,000; 15 cannons	20,000

Casualties and losses
1,000 killed	8,000 killed 3,000 captured

The Battle of Moncontour occurred on 3 October 1569 between the royalist Catholic forces of King Charles IX of France, commanded by Henry, Duke of Anjou, and the Huguenots commanded by Gaspard II de Coligny.

== Battle ==
Weeks before, Coligny had lifted the siege of Poitou and positioned his army in hopes of gaining an advantage over the approaching Royalist forces. However, a flanking manoeuvre by Gaspard de Saulx along the River Dive forced him from this position. This coincided with Henry's objective to keep Coligny's army from joining Gabriel de Lorges, Count of Montgomery's forces operating in the South of the country. Coligny attempted to rectify the situation by moving to a better location across the River Thouet. But he was delayed by a strike by his German mercenaries, who demanded their pay before moving. By the time he was able to get underway, the Royalist army had formed a line of battle and was advancing on his flank. With no choice now but to fight, Coligny formed up to meet them.

The Catholic army is reckoned to have numbered 7–8,000 cavalry, 16–18,000 infantry and 11-15 guns. It included 6,000 Swiss and 3–4,000 Italian infantry, 4-500 Italian cavalry, 3,000 German mercenary reiters and a few hundred Spanish-supplied Walloon cavalry. They were deployed as a vanguard on the right and the main battle on the left.

The former was commanded by Louis, Duke of Montpensier. It numbered 3,500 cavalry and 8,000 infantry. Anjou commanded the main battle in person. It was of a similar size to the vanguard, with 4,000 cavalry and 9,000 infantry. Both the vanguard and main battle had small reserves of mounted troops.

The total size of the Huguenot army is less certain, but was somewhat smaller, perhaps 18–20,000 men and 11 guns. This included 4,500 reiters and 4,000 landsknechts. Although Coligny had plenty of cavalry available, Tavannes was of the opinion that they were not as good as previously. Their losses suffered at Jarnac had been made good from elements drawn from the bourgeoisie, who lacked the same level of equipment, experience and élan as their noble compatriots.

The Huguenot army was also divided into a vanguard and a battle. The Admiral commanded the former on the left of the line, while Louis van Nassau was given command of the battle on the right. The Admiral's vanguard was possibly the larger of the two wings. Few of the native Huguenot infantry present carried pikes.

Before the start of the battle, Coligny sent the young Huguenot princes Henry de Navarre and Henry de Condé to safety with a strong escort, an act which was subsequently blamed for lowering the army's morale.

The battle began with an advance by the Catholic vanguard. Their cavalry saw off the Huguenots skirmishing around the Plumain Grange and then drove back cavalry who advanced to support them. Seeing the strength of the Catholic right, the Admiral ordered Nassau to send him reinforcements. The Dutch Prince complied but also accompanied them himself, leaving the main battle leaderless.

Coligny sent his remaining cavalry against Montpensier, who, in turn, deployed his own reserves. There followed a confused melee in which the Admiral received a pistol shot to the face, forcing him to quit the field. Philibert, Margrave of Baden-Baden, who commanded the Royalist Germans, was killed during this phase of the battle.

Now the Catholic battle attacked. The Huguenots enjoyed some initial success against them; Anjou was unhorsed and had to be rescued by his guard, but there was no one to co-ordinate the Huguenot efforts. Tavannes committed the Swiss infantry as well as the cavalry reserves. This broke the Huguenot cavalry, who retreated from the field, covered by a resolute rear-guard formed by Nassau. The infantry, however, were slaughtered by the Royalist cavalry. The landsknechts formed a defensive square and would probably have surrendered if they had been allowed to do so, but the Swiss cut them down.

Perhaps half the Huguenot infantry were lost, but only 400 cavalry. Both François de la Noue and Jacques II de Crussol were captured. On the Catholic side, cavalry losses were slightly higher, at around 500, but their infantry emerged largely unscathed.

== Aftermath ==
Jealous of his brother's success, King Charles IX decided to take control of the Royal army in person. This displeased both Anjou and Tavannes; the latter retired under the pretext of ill health. The Catholic army then besieged Saint-Jean-d'Angély from 16 October to 2 December. Coligny regrouped, marched east into the Rhône and, months later, marched towards Paris.

== See also ==
- French Wars of Religion

== Bibliography ==
- Butler, A.J. (1907). "The Wars of Religion in France". In Ward, A.W.; Prothero, G.W.; Leathes, Stanley (eds.). The Cambridge Modern History. Vol. III. Cambridge University Press.
- Knecht, R. J. (1989). The French Wars of Religion 1559–1598. Longman.
- Knecht, R. J. (1998). Catherine de' Medici. Pearson Education.
- Tucker, Spencer C., ed. (2010). A Global Chronology of Conflict: From the Ancient World to the Modern Middle East. Vol. Two. ABC-Clio.
- O'Brien de Clare, T.J. (2021). One Faith, One Law, One King. Helion.
- Wood, James B. (2002). The King's Army: Warfare, soldiers and society during the Wars of Religion in France, 1562–1576. Cambridge University Press.
