= French Wars of Religion =

1562–1598 Catholic-Protestant conflicts

- Part of the European wars of religion
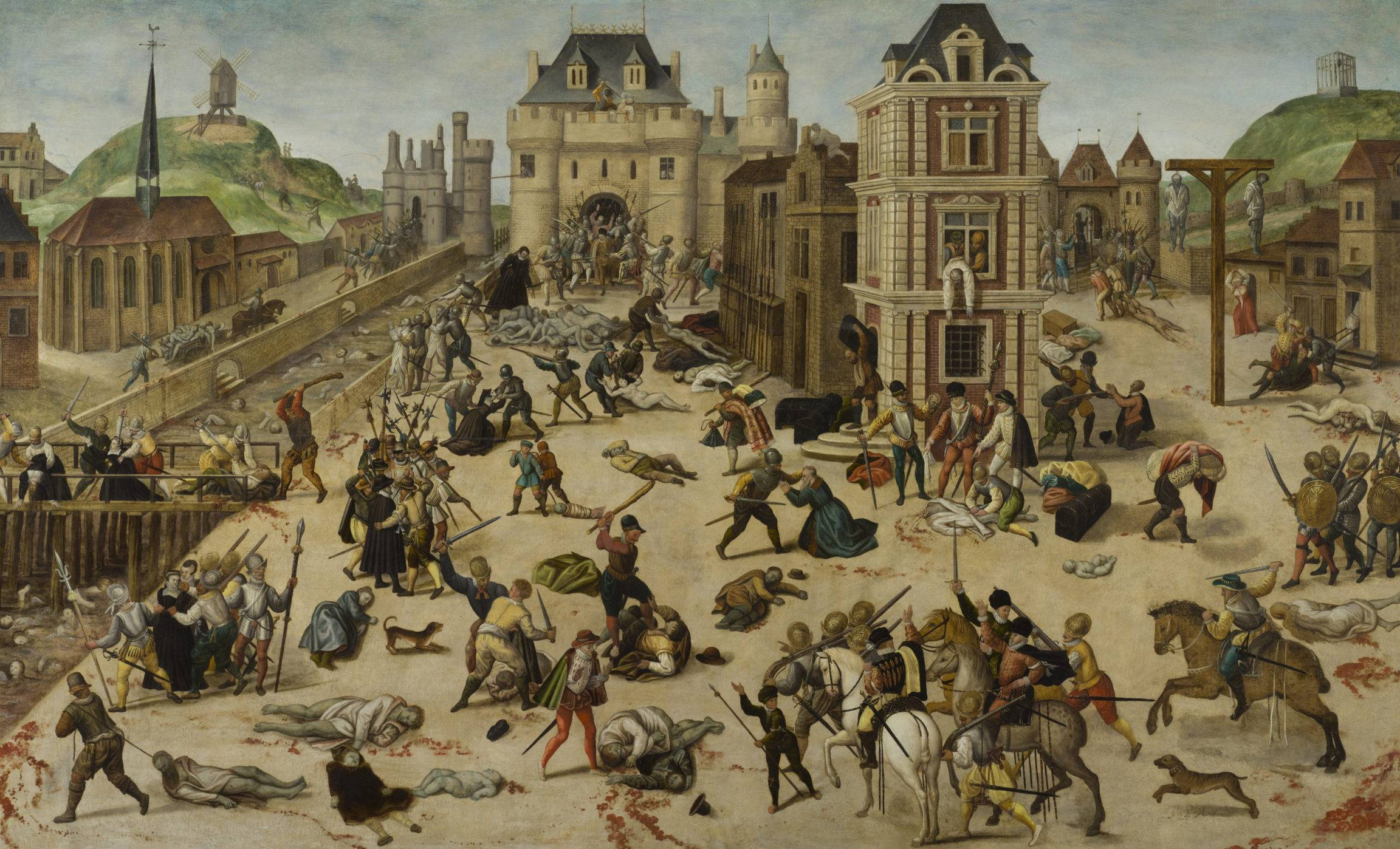
- The St. Bartholomew's Day massacre (1572) by François Dubois
Date	2 April 1562 – 30 April 1598 (36 years and 4 weeks)
Location	France, particularly in the west and southwest of the country
Result	See Aftermath

Belligerents
Protestants: Huguenots; England; Scotland; Navarre; United Provinces Politiques; Malcontents; (1574-1576)	France; Spain (until 1588); Papal States (until 1588); Tuscany	Catholics: Catholic League; Spain (from 1588); Savoy; Portugal

Commanders and leaders
(Kingdom of Navarre) Henry of Navarre (until 1589); Louis I, Prince of Condé (executed); Gaspard II de Coligny X; Gabriel de Lorges, Count of Montgomery (executed); (England) Elizabeth I; (England) (Scotland) James VI; (Kingdom of Navarre) Jeanne d'Albret; Wolfgang, Count Palatine of Zweibrücken †; John I, Count Palatine of Zweibrücken; (Dutch Republic) Louis of Nassau; (Dutch Republic) William the Silent; Francis, Duke of Anjou; Henri I de Montmorency (from 1574)	(Kingdom of France) Catherine de' Medici; (Kingdom of France) Charles IX; (Kingdom of France) Henry III X; (Kingdom of France) Henry IV (after 1589); (Kingdom of France) (Kingdom of Navarre) Antoine of Navarre (DOW); (Kingdom of France) Jacques d'Albon, Seigneur de Saint André †; (Kingdom of France) François, Duke of Guise X; (Kingdom of France) Henri I, Duke of Guise (until 1584) X; (Kingdom of France) François de Montmorency; (Kingdom of France) Anne de Montmorency †; (Kingdom of France) Claude, Duke of Aumale †	House of Guise; (Spanish Empire) (Portuguese Empire) Philip II; (Papal States) Pope Sixtus V; (Duchy of Savoy) Charles Emmanuel I; 1595–1598: (Spanish Empire) Pedro Henriquez de Acevedo, Count of Fuentes (Spanish Empire) Carlos Coloma (Spanish Empire) Albert VII, Archduke of Austria (Spanish Empire) Girolamo Caraffa (Spanish Empire) Luis de Velasco y Velasco, 2nd Count of Salazar (Spanish Empire) Juan Fernández de Velasco y Tovar, 5th Duke of Frías (Spanish Empire) Hernando Portocarrero †; Charles, Duke of Mayenne

Casualties and losses
- Between 2 million and 4 million deaths from all causes

The French Wars of Religion (French: Guerres de Religion en France) were a series of civil wars between French Catholics and Protestants (called Huguenots) from 1562 to 1598. Between two and four million people died from violence, famine or disease directly caused by the conflict, and it severely damaged the power of the French monarchy. The fighting ended with a compromise in 1598, when Henry of Navarre, who converted to Catholicism in 1593, was proclaimed King Henry IV of France and issued the Edict of Nantes, which granted substantial rights and freedoms to the Huguenots. However, Catholics continued to disapprove of Protestants and of Henry, and his assassination in 1610 triggered a fresh round of Huguenot rebellions in the 1620s.

Tensions between the two religions had been building since the 1530s, exacerbating existing regional divisions, and quests for power among the nobles. The sudden accidental death of Henry II of France in July 1559 initiated a prolonged struggle for power between his widow Catherine de' Medici and powerful nobles. These included a fervently Catholic faction led by the Guise and Montmorency families, and Protestants headed by the House of Condé and the Navarrese queen, Jeanne d'Albret. Both sides received assistance from external powers, with Spain and Savoy supporting the Catholics, and England and the Dutch Republic backing the Protestants.

Moderates, also known as Politiques, hoped to maintain order by centralising power and making concessions to Huguenots, rather than the policies of repression pursued by Henry II and his father Francis I. The Politiques were initially supported by Catherine de' Medici, whose January 1562 Edict of Saint-Germain was strongly opposed by the Guise faction and led to an outbreak of widespread fighting in March. She later hardened her stance and backed the 1572 St. Bartholomew's Day massacre in Paris, which resulted in Catholic mobs killing between 5,000 and 30,000 Protestants throughout France.

The wars threatened the authority of the monarchy and the last Valois kings, Catherine's three sons Francis II, Charles IX, and Henry III. Their Bourbon successor Henry IV responded by creating a strong central state and extending toleration to Huguenots; the latter policy would last until 1685, when Henry's grandson Louis XIV revoked the Edict of Nantes.

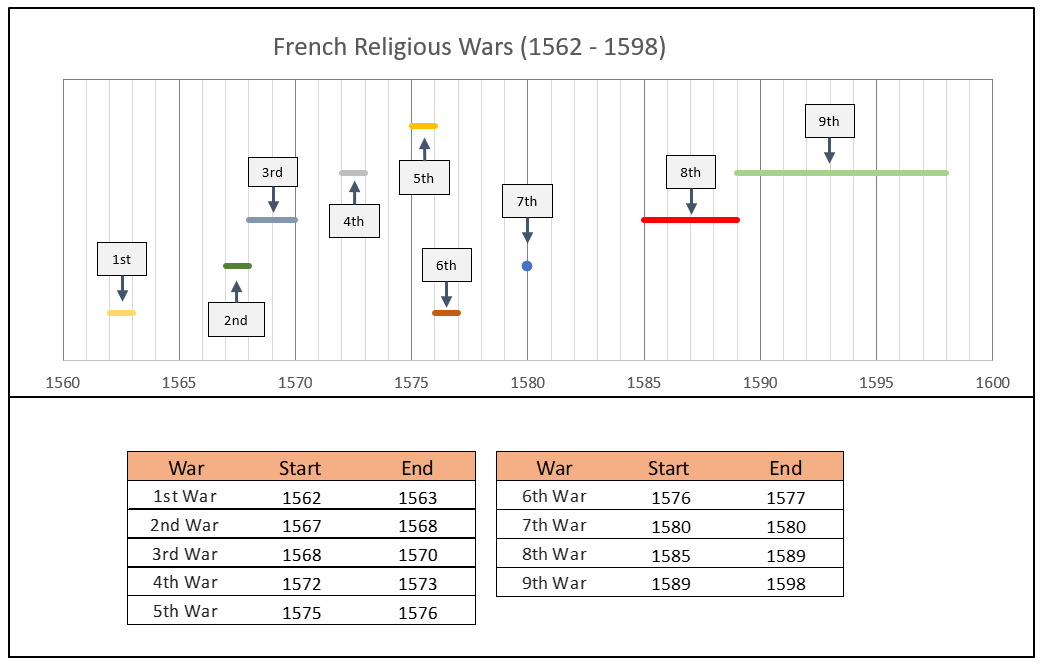
Timeline for the French religious wars

== Name and periodisation ==
Along with "French Wars of Religion" and "Huguenot Wars", the wars have also been variously described as the "Eight Wars of Religion", or simply the "Wars of Religion" (only within France).

The exact number of wars and their respective dates are subject to continued debate by historians: some assert that the Edict of Nantes (13 April 1598) and the Peace of Vervins (2 May 1598) concluded the wars, while the ensuing 1620s Huguenot rebellions lead others to believe the Peace of Alès in 1629 is the actual conclusion. However, the agreed upon beginning of the wars is the Massacre of Wassy in 1562, and the Edict of Nantes at least ended this series of conflicts. During this time, complex diplomatic negotiations and agreements of peace were followed by renewed conflict and power struggles.

American military historians Kiser, Drass and Brustein (1994) maintained the following divisions, periodisations and locations:

- Massacre of Vassy (1562) – Western France
- First War of Religion (1562–1563) – Western and Southwestern France
- Second War of Religion (1567–1568) – Western and Southwestern France
- Third War of Religion (1568–1570) – Western and Southwestern France
- St. Bartholomew's Day massacre (1572) – Northeastern France
- Fourth War of Religion (1572–1573) – Western and Southwestern France
- Fifth War of Religion (1575–1576) – Western and Southwestern France
- Sixth War of Religion (1576–1577) – Western and Southwestern France
- Seventh War of Religion (1580) – Western and Southwestern France
- Eighth War of Religion (1585–1589) – Western and Southwestern France
- Ninth War of Religion (1589–1598) – Western and Southwestern France

Both Kohn (2013) and Clodfelter (2017) followed the same counting and periodisation and noted that "War of the Three Henrys" was another name for the Eighth War of Religion, with Kohn adding "Lovers' War" as another name for the Seventh War. In her biography of Michel de Montaigne (2014), Elizabeth Guild concurred with this chronology as well, except for dating the Seventh War of Religion to 1579–1580 rather than just 1580. Holt (2005) asserted a rather different periodisation from 1562 to 1629, writing of "civil wars" rather than wars of religion, dating the Sixth War to March–September 1577, and dating the Eight War from June 1584 (death of Anjou) to April 1598 (Edict of Nantes); finally, although he didn't put a number on it, Holt regarded the 1610–1629 period as 'the last war of religion'.

== Background ==
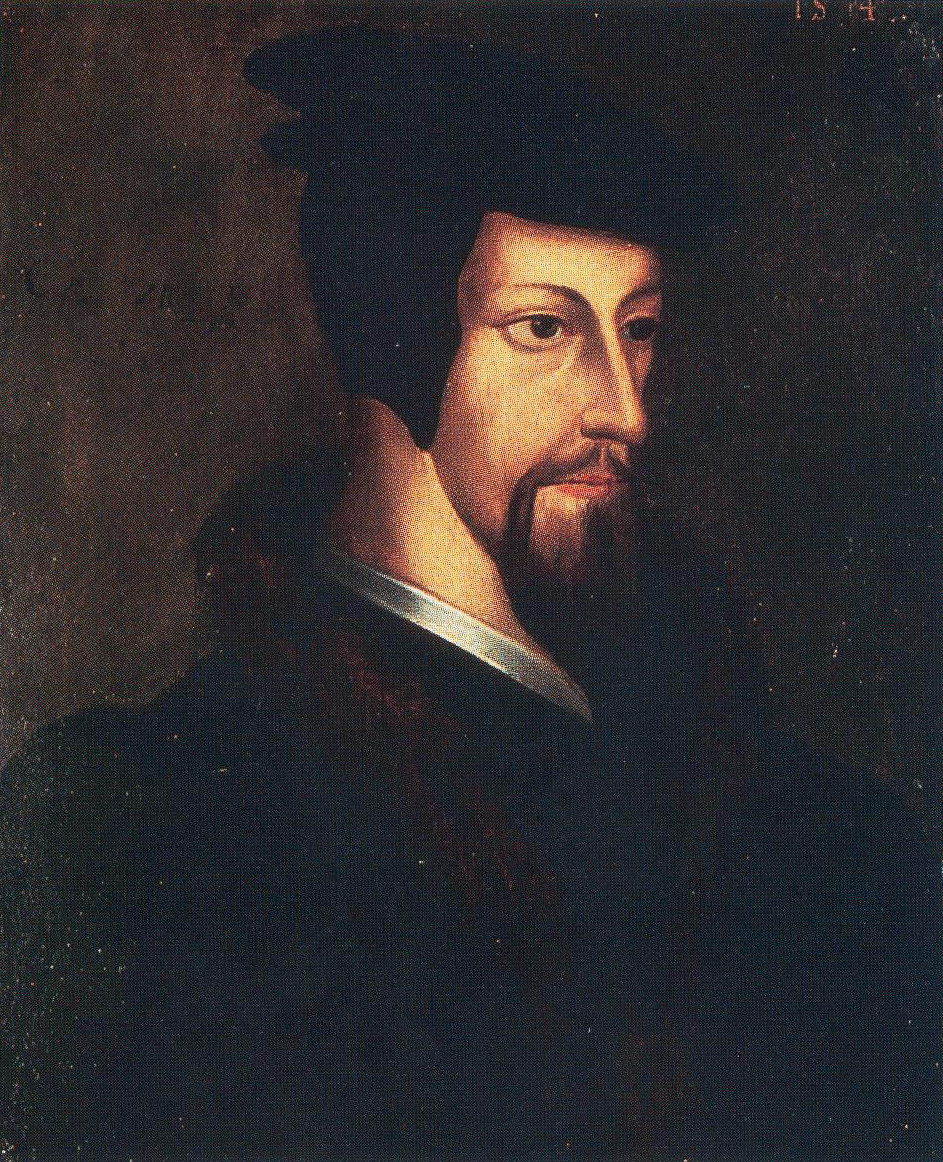
John Calvin, whose ideas became central to French Protestantism

=== Introduction of Reformation ideas ===
Renaissance humanism began during the 14th century in Italy and arrived in France in the early 16th, coinciding with the rise of Protestantism in France. The movement emphasised the importance of ad fontes, or study of original sources, and initially focused on the reconstruction of secular Greek and Latin texts. It later expanded into the reading, study and translation of works by the Church Fathers and the New Testament, with a view to religious renewal and reform. Humanist scholars argued interpretation of the Bible required an ability to read the New Testament and Old Testaments in the original Greek and Hebrew, rather than relying on the 4th century Latin translation known as the "Vulgate Bible".

In 1495, the Venetian Aldus Manutius began using the newly invented printing press to produce small, inexpensive, pocket editions of Greek, Latin, and vernacular literature, making knowledge in all disciplines available for the first time to a wide audience. Cheap pamphlets and broadsides allowed theological and religious ideas to be disseminated at an unprecedented pace. In 1519, John Froben published a collection of works by Martin Luther and noted in his correspondence that 600 copies were being shipped to France and Spain and sold in Paris.

16th-century religious geopolitics on a map of modern France Huguenot controlled Contested Catholic controlled

In 1521, a group of reformers including Jacques Lefèvre and Guillaume Briçonnet, recently appointed bishop of Meaux, formed the Circle of Meaux, aiming to improve the quality of preaching and religious life in general. They were joined by François Vatable, an expert in Hebrew, along with Guillaume Budé, a classicist and Royal librarian. Lefèvre's Fivefold Psalter and his commentary on the Epistle to the Romans emphasised the literal interpretation of the Bible and the centrality of Jesus Christ. Many of the tenets behind Lutheranism first appeared in Luther's lectures, which in turn contained many of the ideas expressed in the works of Lefèvre.

Other members of the Circle included Marguerite de Navarre, sister of Francis I and mother of Jeanne d'Albret, as well as Guillaume Farel, who was exiled to Geneva in 1530 due to his reformist views and persuaded John Calvin to join him there. Both men were banished from Geneva in 1538 for opposing what they viewed as government interference with religious affairs; although the two fell out over the nature of the Eucharist, Calvin's return to Geneva in 1541 allowed him to forge the doctrine of Calvinism.

A key driver behind the Reform movement was corruption among the clergy which Luther and others attacked and sought to change. Such criticisms were not new but the printing press allowed them to be widely shared, such as the Heptaméron by Marguerite, a collection of stories about clerical immorality. Another complaint was the reduction of Salvation to a business scheme based on the sale of Indulgences, which added to general unrest and increased the popularity of works such as Farel's translation of the Lord's Prayer, The True and Perfect Prayer. This focused on Sola fide, or the idea salvation was a free gift from God, emphasised the importance of understanding in prayer and criticised the clergy for hampering the growth of true faith.

=== Growth of Calvinism ===
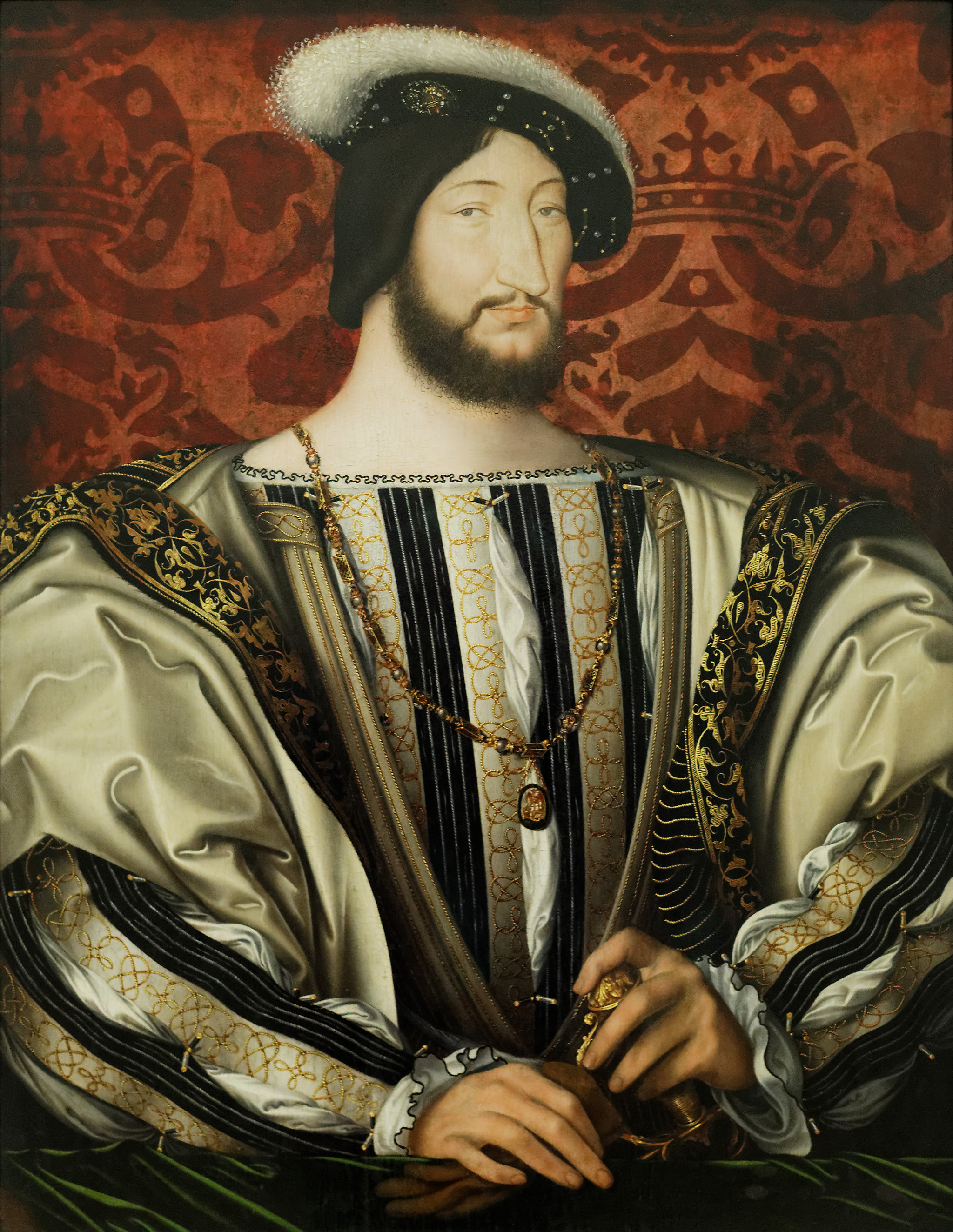
After an initial period of tolerance, Francis I repressed Reformist ideas

The Italian revival of classical learning appealed to Francis I (1494–1547), who set up royal professorships in Paris to better understand ancient literature. However, this did not extend to religion, especially after the 1516 Concordat of Bologna when Pope Leo X increased royal control of the Gallican church, allowing Francis to nominate French clergy and levy taxes on church property. Unlike Germany, the French nobility also generally supported the status quo and existing policies.

Despite his personal opposition, Francis tolerated Martin Luther's ideas when they entered France in the late 1520s, largely because the definition of Catholic orthodoxy was unclear, making it hard to determine precisely what was or was not heresy. He tried to steer a middle course in the developing religious schism, but in January 1535, Catholic authorities made a definitive ruling by classifying "Lutherans" as heretical Zwinglians. Calvin, originally from Noyon in Picardy, went into exile in 1535 to escape persecution and settled in Basel, where he published the Institutes of the Christian Religion in 1538. This work contained the key principles of Calvinism, which became immensely popular in France and other European countries.

Lutheranism was widespread within the French commercial class; it flourished in the cities but was not adopted among the peasantry. However, it cut across social class and strata and encompassed the entire country. Its rapid growth was driven by the nobility, where being a Huguenot became fashionable. It is believed to have started when Condé passed through Geneva while returning home from a military campaign and heard a Calvinist sermon. Jeanne d'Albret, Queen of Navarre, converted to Calvinism in 1560, possibly due to the influence of Theodore Beza. Along with Condé and her husband Antoine of Navarre, she and their son Henry of Navarre became Huguenot leaders.

=== Rise in factionalism ===
The crown continued efforts to remain neutral in the religious debate until the Affair of the Placards in October 1534, when Protestant radicals put up posters in Paris and other provincial towns that rejected the Catholic doctrine of the "Real presence of Christ in the Eucharist". This allowed Protestantism to be clearly defined as heresy, while Francis was furious at the breach of security which had allowed one of the posters to be placed on the door of his bedchamber. Having been severely criticised for his initial tolerance, he was now encouraged to punish those responsible. On 21 February 1535, a number of those implicated in the Affair were executed in front of Notre-Dame de Paris, an event attended by Francis and members of the Ottoman embassy to France.

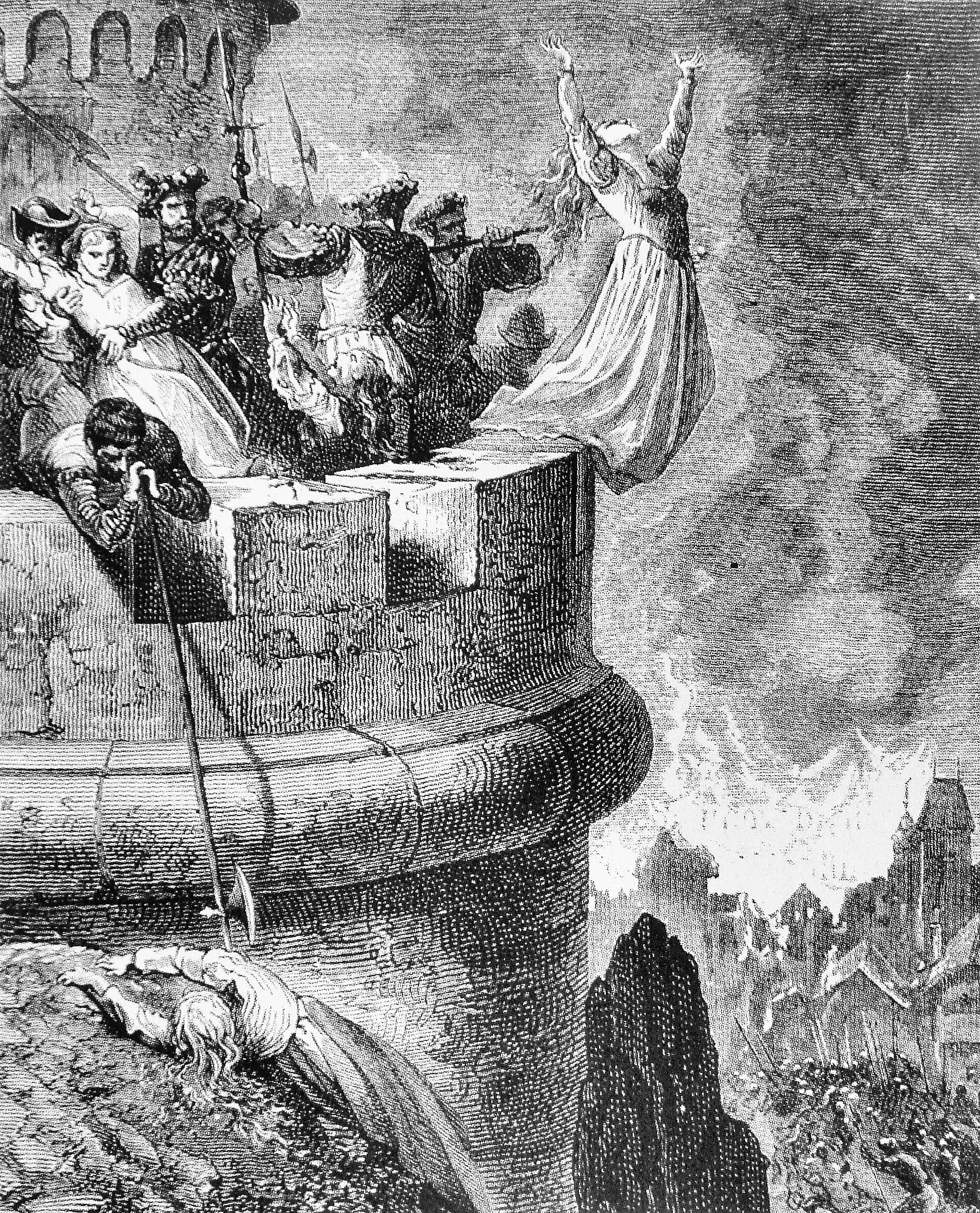
Massacre of Mérindol, as imagined by Gustave Doré (1832–1883)

The fight against heresy intensified in the 1540s, forcing Protestants to worship in secret. In October 1545, Francis ordered the punishment of Waldensians based in the south-eastern village of Mérindol. A long-standing Proto-Protestantism tradition dating back to the 13th century, the Waldensians had recently affiliated with the Reformed church and became increasingly militant in their activities. In what became known as the Massacre of Mérindol, Provençal troops killed numerous residents and destroyed another 22 to 28 nearby villages, while hundreds of men were forced to become Galley slaves.

Francis I died on 31 March 1547 and was succeeded by his son Henry II, who continued the religious repression pursued by his father in the last years of his reign. His policies were even more severe since he sincerely believed all Protestants were heretics; on 27 June 1551, the Edict of Châteaubriant sharply curtailed their right to worship. Prohibitions were placed upon the distribution of 'heretical' literature, with the property of 'heretics' seizable by the crown.

From his base in Geneva, Calvin provided leadership and organisational structures for the Reformed Church of France. Calvinism proved attractive to people from across the social hierarchy and occupational divides and was highly regionalised, with no coherent pattern of geographical spread. Despite persecution, their numbers and power increased markedly, driven by the conversion to Calvinism of large sections of the nobility. Historians estimate that by the outbreak of war in 1562, there were around two million French Calvinists, including more than half of the nobility, backed by 1,200–1,250 churches. This constituted a substantial threat to the monarchy.

=== Amboise conspiracy ===
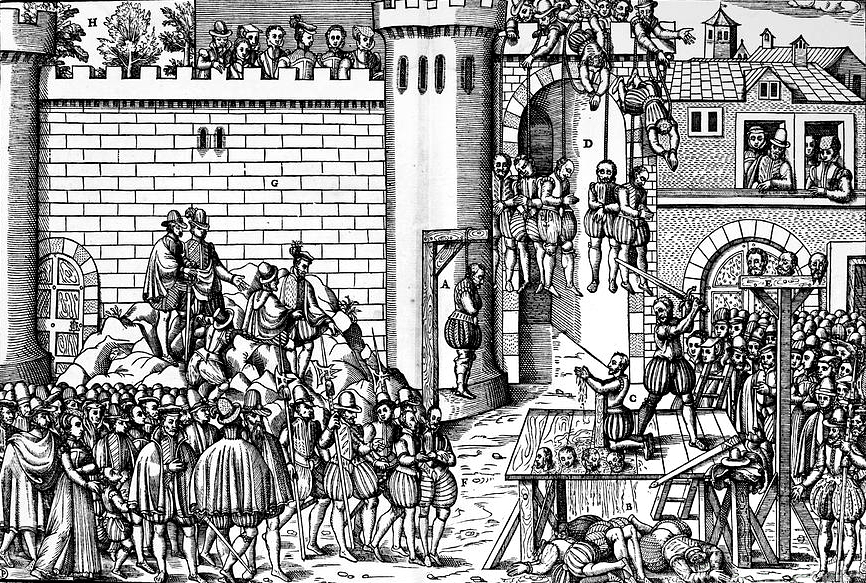
Contemporary woodcut of executions following the Amboise conspiracy

In 1559, the Italian wars between France and Spain ended with the treaty of Cateau-Cambrésis. These wars had nearly bankrupted both countries. Additionally, the death of Henry II in July 1559 created a political vacuum and an internal struggle for power between rival factions, which the 15-year-old Francis II lacked the ability to control. François, Duke of Guise, whose niece Mary, Queen of Scots, was married to the king, exploited the situation to establish dominance over their rivals, the House of Montmorency. Within days of the King's accession, the English ambassador reported "the house of Guise ruleth and doth all about the French King".

On 10 March 1560, a group of disaffected nobles led by Jean du Barry, attempted to break the power of the Guise by abducting the young king. Their plans were discovered before being carried out and hundreds of suspected plotters executed, including du Barry. The Guise suspected Condé of involvement in the plot, and he was arrested and sentenced to death before being freed in the political chaos that followed the sudden death of Francis II, adding to the tensions of the period.

In the aftermath of the plot, the term "Huguenot" for France's Protestants came into widespread usage. Shortly afterwards, the first instances of Protestant iconoclasm or the destruction of images and statues in Catholic churches, occurred in Rouen and La Rochelle. This continued throughout 1561 in more than 20 cities and towns, sparking attacks on Protestants by Catholic mobs in Sens, Cahors, Carcassonne, Tours and elsewhere.

=== Regency of Catherine de' Medici ===
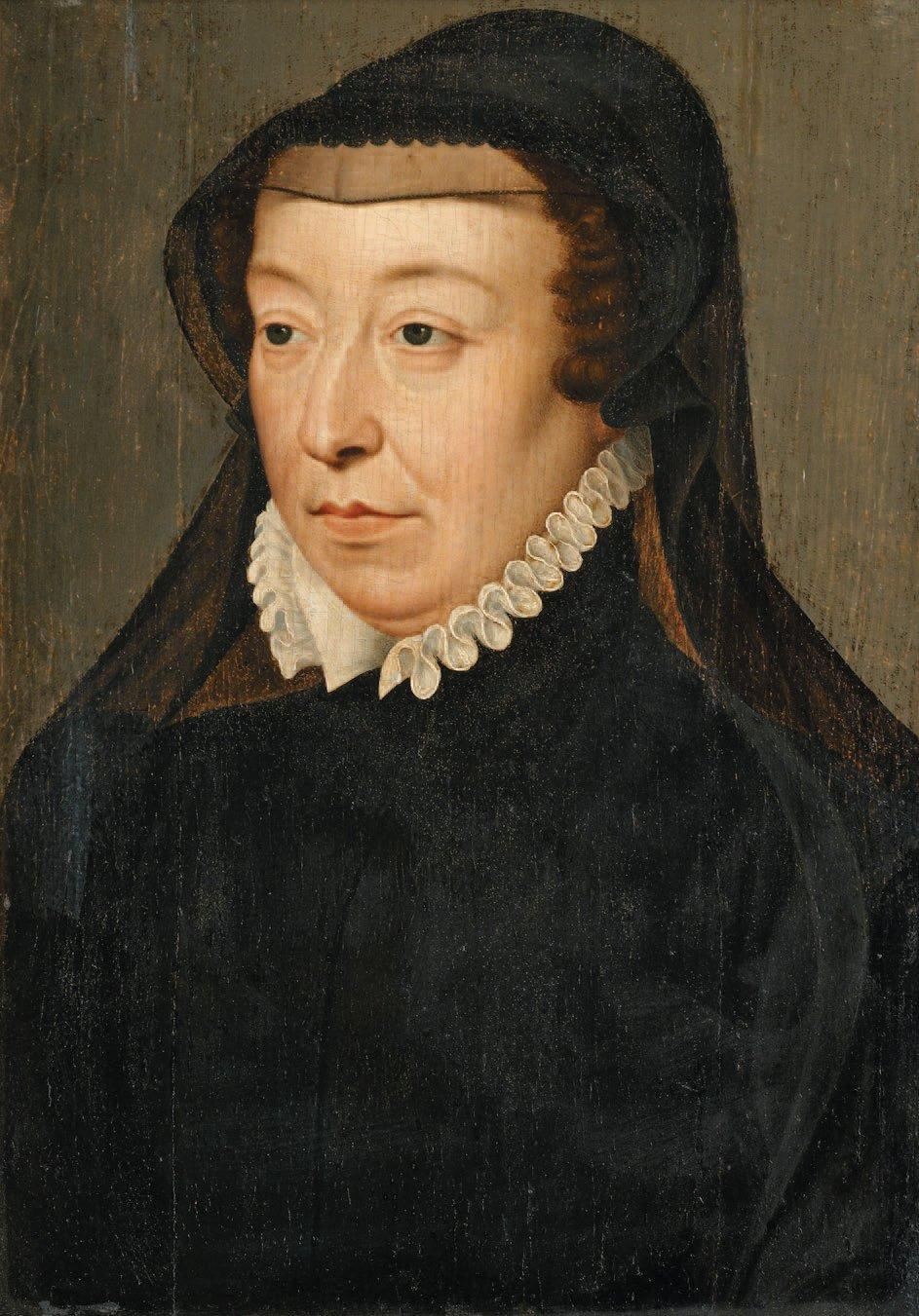
Queen regent Catherine de' Medici, c. 1560

When Francis II died on 5 December 1560, his mother Catherine de' Medici became regent for her second son, the nine year old Charles IX. With the state financially exhausted by the Italian Wars, Catherine had to preserve the independence of the monarchy from a range of competing factions led by powerful nobles, each of whom controlled what were essentially private armies. To offset the Guise or "Guisard", she agreed a deal in which Antoine of Navarre renounced any claim to the regency in return for Condé's release and the position of Lieutenant-General of France.

Catherine had several options for dealing with "heresy", including continuing Henry's II's failed policy of eradication, an approach backed by Catholic ultras such as François de Tournon, or converting the monarchy to Calvinism, as preferred by de Bèze. A middle path between these two extremes was allowing both religions to be openly practised in France at least temporarily, or the Guisard compromise of scaling back persecution but not permitting toleration. For the moment she held to the Guisard line.

Before his death, Francis II had called the first Estates General held since 1484, which in December 1560 assembled in Orléans to discuss topics which included taxation and religion. It made little progress on the latter, other than agreeing to pardon those convicted of religious offences in the prior year. Since this was clearly unacceptable to Condé and his followers, Catherine bypassed the Estates and enacted conciliatory measures such as the Edict of 19 April 1561 and the Edict of July. This recognised Catholicism as the state religion but confirmed previous measures reducing penalties for "heresy".

The Estates then approved the Colloquy of Poissy, which began its session on 8 September 1561, with the Protestants led by de Bèze and the Catholics by Charles, Cardinal of Lorraine, brother of the Duke of Guise. The two sides initially sought to accommodate Protestant forms of worship within the existing church but this proved impossible. (Note: Catholic opponents of toleration were split between Ultramontanism, those who backed the supreme authority of the Pope such as Charles of Lorraine, and Gallicanism. The latter viewed an independent but Catholic monarchy as an important guarantee of political freedom and distinguishes them from the "Politiques".) By the time the Colloquy ended on 8 October, it was clear the divide between Catholic and Protestant theology was too wide to be bridged. With their options narrowing, the government attempted to quell escalating disorder in the provinces by passing the Edict of Saint-Germain, which allowed Protestants to worship in public outside towns and in private inside them. On 1 March, Guise family retainers attacked a Calvinist service in Champagne, leading to what became known as the massacre of Vassy. This seemed to confirm Huguenot fears that the Guisards had no intention of compromising and is generally seen as the spark which led to open hostilities between the two religions.

=== Turn to violence ===
Guyenne was the epicentre of the turn to religious violence in late 16th-century France. Many explanations have been proffered for the rise of violence. Traditional explanations focus on the influence of Jeanne d'Albret and Antoine of Navarre. Other explanations focus on the rise of seigneurialism in the 1550s and see the turn to violence as a response of the peasant class. The murder of the baron of Château de Fumel by a Protestant mob in 1561 is often cited as an example. Recent analyses, on the other hand, have turned the focus on religious explanations. Denis Crouzet blames the fiery eschatological preaching of the Franciscan Thomas Illyricus, who toured the region in the 1510s and 1520s. Stuart Carroll, however, argues for politicisation: "the violence was directly caused by politicized factions and was not the result of a spontaneous intercommunal eruption."

== 1562–1570 ==
=== "First" war (1562–1563) ===
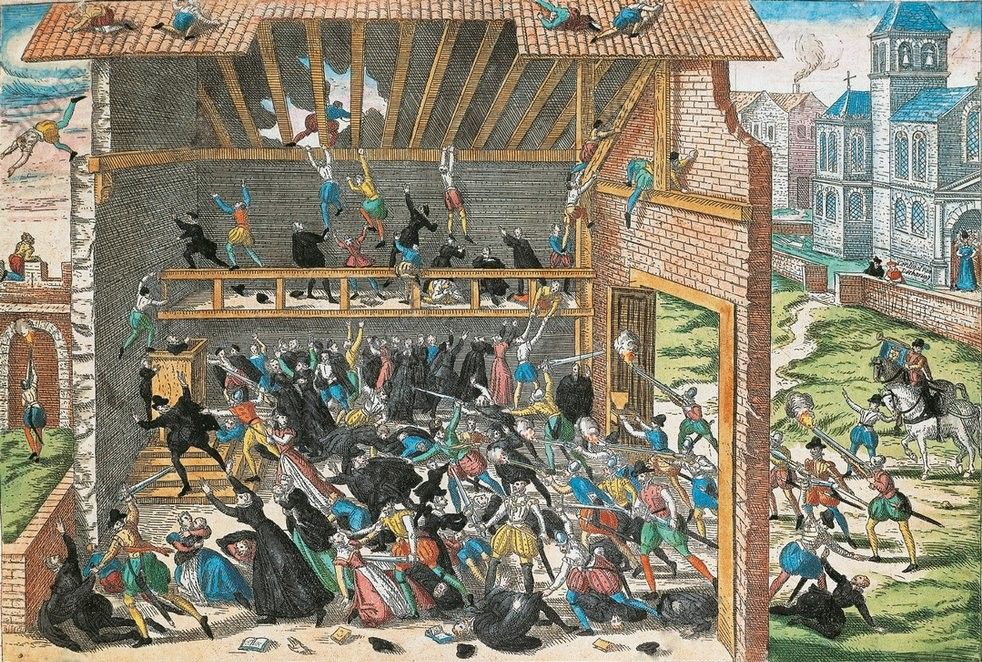
Massacre de Vassy by Hogenberg, end of the 16th century

Although the Huguenots had begun mobilising for war before the Vassy massacre, many took the massacre as proof that they could not rely on the Edict of Saint-Germain. In response, a group of nobles led by Condé proclaimed their intention of "liberating" the king from "evil" councillors and seized Orléans on 2 April 1562. This example was quickly followed by Protestant groups around France, who seized and garrisoned Angers, Blois and Tours along the Loire and assaulted Valence in the Rhône River. Many of these towns were captured thanks to the collaboration of leading municipal magistrates, such as Rouen on 15 April, and suffered waves of iconoclasm in the aftermath. After capturing Lyon on 30 April, the attackers first sacked, then demolished all Catholic institutions in the city, forbade all Catholic rituals and expelled all priests, monks and nuns.

Hoping to turn Toulouse over to Condé, local Huguenots seized the Hôtel de ville but met resistance from angry Catholic mobs which resulted in street battles and over 3,000 deaths, mostly Huguenots. On 12 April 1562, there were massacres of Huguenots at Sens, as well as at Tours in July. As the conflict escalated, the Crown revoked the Edict under pressure from the Guise faction.

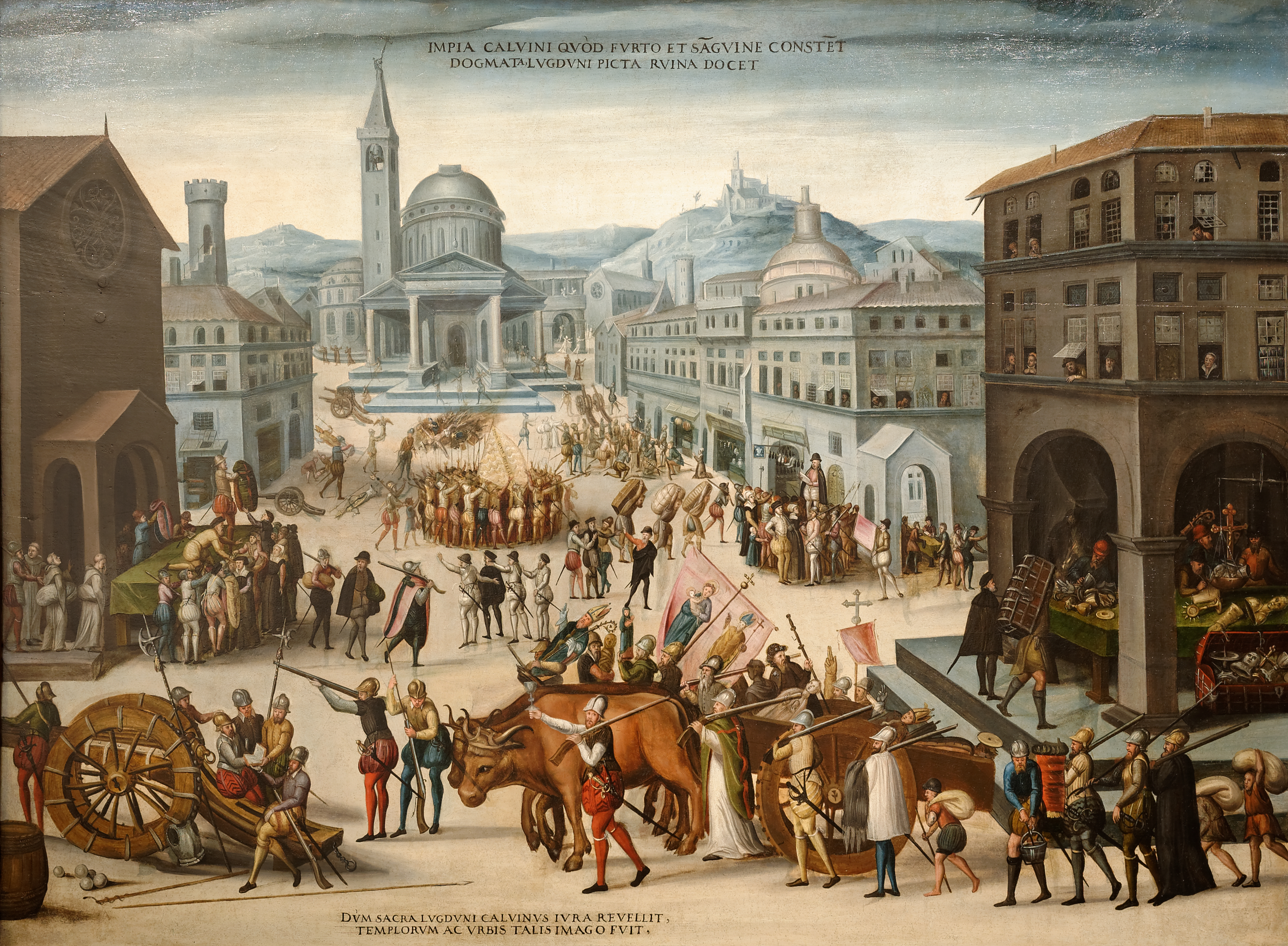
Looting of the churches of Lyon by the Calvinists in 1562, by Antoine Carot

The major engagements of the war occurred at Rouen, Dreux, and Orléans. At the Siege of Rouen (May–October 1562), royal troops regained the city, but Antoine of Navarre died of his wounds. In the Battle of Dreux (December 1562), Condé was captured by the royalists, and the constable Montmorency was captured by Huguenots. In February 1563, at the Siege of Orléans, François, Duke of Guise, was shot and killed by the Huguenot Jean de Poltrot de Méré. Because he was killed outside of direct combat, the Guise considered this an assassination on the orders of the duke's enemy, Admiral Coligny. The popular unrest caused by the assassination, coupled with the resistance by the city of Orléans to the siege, led Catherine de' Medici to mediate a truce, resulting in the Edict of Amboise on 19 March 1563.

=== "Armed Peace" (1563–1567) and the "second" war (1567–1568) ===
Plate from Richard Rowlands, Theatrum Crudelitatum Haereticorum Nostri Temporis (1587), depicting the martyrdom of Inácio de Azevedo and his companions by Huguenots pirates

Plate from Richard Rowlands, Theatrum Crudelitatum Haereticorum Nostri Temporis (1587), depicting Huguenot atrocities against Catholics in southern France

The Edict of Amboise was generally regarded as unsatisfactory by all concerned, and the Guise faction was particularly opposed to what they saw as dangerous concessions to heretics. The crown tried to re-unite the two factions in its efforts to re-capture Le Havre, which had been occupied by the English in 1562 as part of the Treaty of Hampton Court between its Huguenot leaders and Elizabeth I of England. That July, the French expelled the English. On 17 August 1563, the Parlement of Rouen declared that Charles IX was old enough to rule, thereby ending the regency of Catherine de' Medici. His mother continued to play a principal role in politics, and she joined her son on a grand tour of the kingdom between 1564 and 1566, designed to reinstate crown authority. During this time, Jeanne d'Albret met and held talks with Catherine at Mâcon and Nérac. Charles and Catherine would meet with the Spanish Queen Elisabeth, and royal favourite the duke of Alba at Bayonne in June 1565 for diplomatic talks. The Protestants, excluded from the talks, were made suspicious of what might have been agreed at them.

Reports of iconoclasm in Flanders led Charles IX to lend support to the Catholics there; French Huguenots feared a Catholic re-mobilisation against them. Philip II of Spain's reinforcement of the strategic corridor from Italy north along the Rhine added to these fears, and political discontent grew. After Protestant troops unsuccessfully tried to capture and take control of King Charles IX in the Surprise of Meaux, a number of cities, such as La Rochelle, declared themselves for the Huguenot cause. Protestants attacked and massacred Catholic laymen and clergy the following day in Nîmes, in what became known as the Michelade.

This provoked the second war and its main military engagement, the Battle of Saint-Denis, where the crown's commander-in-chief and lieutenant general, the 74-year-old Anne de Montmorency, died. The war was brief, ending in another truce, the Peace of Longjumeau (March 1568), which was a reiteration of the Peace of Amboise of 1563 and once again granted significant religious freedoms and privileges to Protestants. In some places the official peace did not put an end to hostilities. News of the truce reached Toulouse in April, but such was the antagonism between the two sides that 6,000 Catholics continued their siege of Puylaurens, a notorious Protestant stronghold in the Lauragais, for another week.

=== "Third" war (1568–1570) ===
In reaction to the Peace, Catholic confraternities and leagues sprang up across the country in defiance of the law throughout the summer of 1568, while in Paris the Cardinal of Lorraine, who dominated the royal council, and Henri, Duke d'Anjou (brother and heir to the king) hatched a plot to seize Protestant towns and leaders. Many followers of Coligny and Condé were murdered, and in September, the Edict of Saint-Maur revoked the freedom of Huguenots to worship. However Condé and Coligny managed to escape at La Rochelle, where they organized a new army. In November, William of Orange led an army into France to support his fellow Protestants, but, the army being poorly paid, he accepted the crown's offer of money and free passage to leave the country.

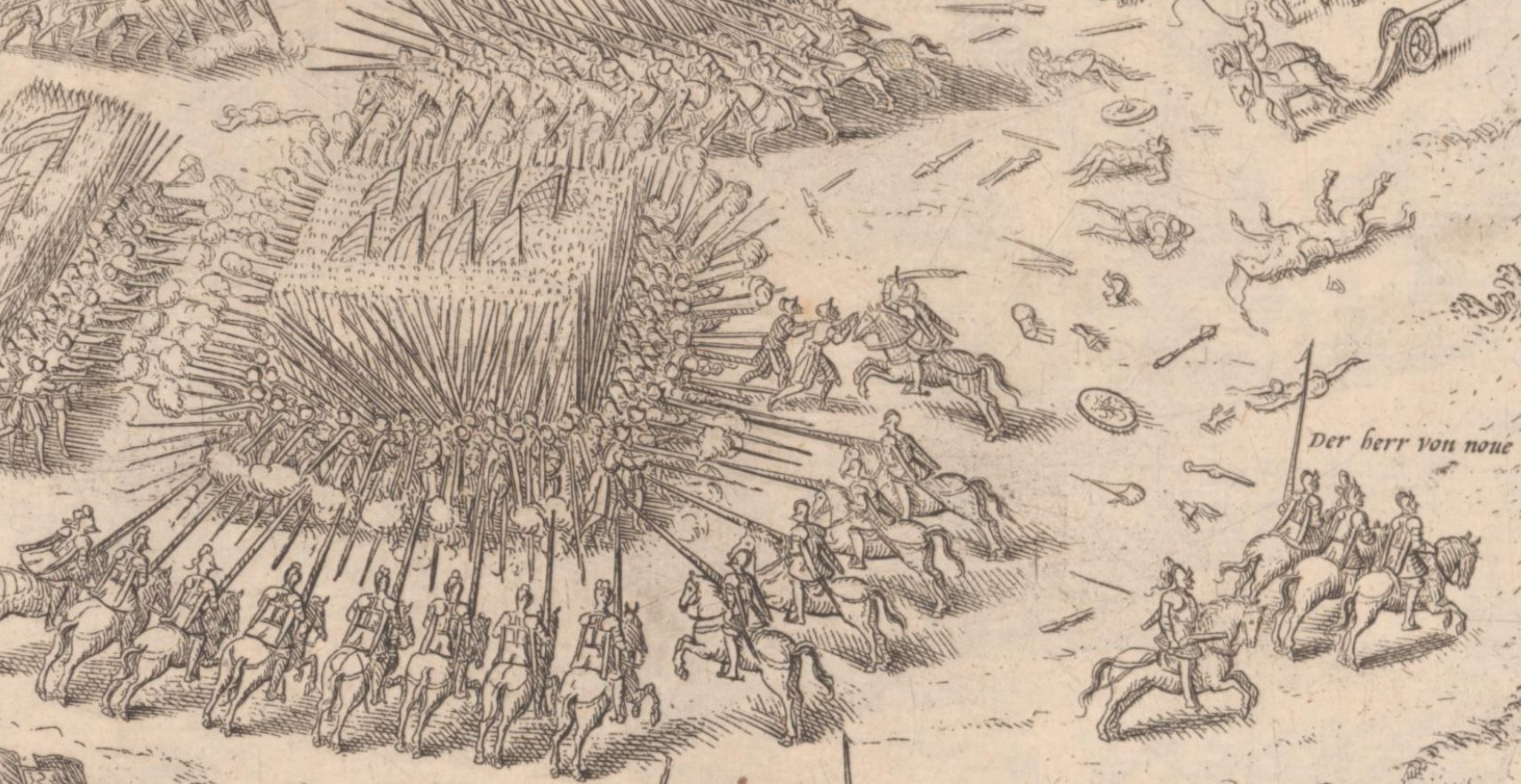
The Battle of Moncontour, 1569

The Huguenots gathered a formidable army under the command of Condé, aided by forces from south-east France, led by Paul de Mouvans, and a contingent of fellow Protestant militias from Germany – including 14,000 mercenary reiters led by the Calvinist Duke of Zweibrücken. After the Duke was killed in action, his troops remained under the employ of the Huguenots who had raised a loan from England against the security of Jeanne d'Albret's crown jewels. Much of the Huguenots' financing came from Queen Elizabeth of England, who was likely influenced in the matter by Sir Francis Walsingham. The Catholics were commanded by the Duke d'Anjou – later King Henry III – and assisted by troops from Spain, the Papal States, and the Grand Duchy of Tuscany.

The Protestant army laid siege to several cities in the Poitou and Saintonge regions (to protect La Rochelle), and then Angoulême and Cognac. At the Battle of Jarnac (16 March 1569), the prince of Condé was killed, forcing Admiral de Coligny to take command of the Protestant forces, nominally on behalf of Condé's 16-year-old son, Henri, and the 15-year-old Henry of Navarre, who were presented by Jeanne d'Albret as the legitimate leaders of the Huguenot cause against royal authority. The Battle of La Roche-l'Abeille was a nominal victory for the Huguenots, but they were unable to seize control of Poitiers and were soundly defeated at the Battle of Moncontour (30 October 1569). However, while Anjou and the king mounted a costly siege of Saint-Jean-d'Angély in Saintonge, Coligny and his troops retreated to the south-west and regrouped with Gabriel, comte de Montgomery, and in the spring of 1570, they pillaged Toulouse, cut a path through the south of France, and went up the Rhone valley up to La Charité-sur-Loire. Local governors were unable to stop Coligny; an army under Artus de Cossé fought an inconclusive battle at Arnay-le-Duc in June of 1570, but Coligny remained at large. The staggering royal debt and Charles IX's desire to seek a peaceful solution led to the Peace of Saint-Germain-en-Laye (8 August 1570), negotiated by Jeanne d'Albret, which once more allowed some concessions to the Huguenots.

== St. Bartholomew's Day massacre and "fourth" war (1572–1573) ==
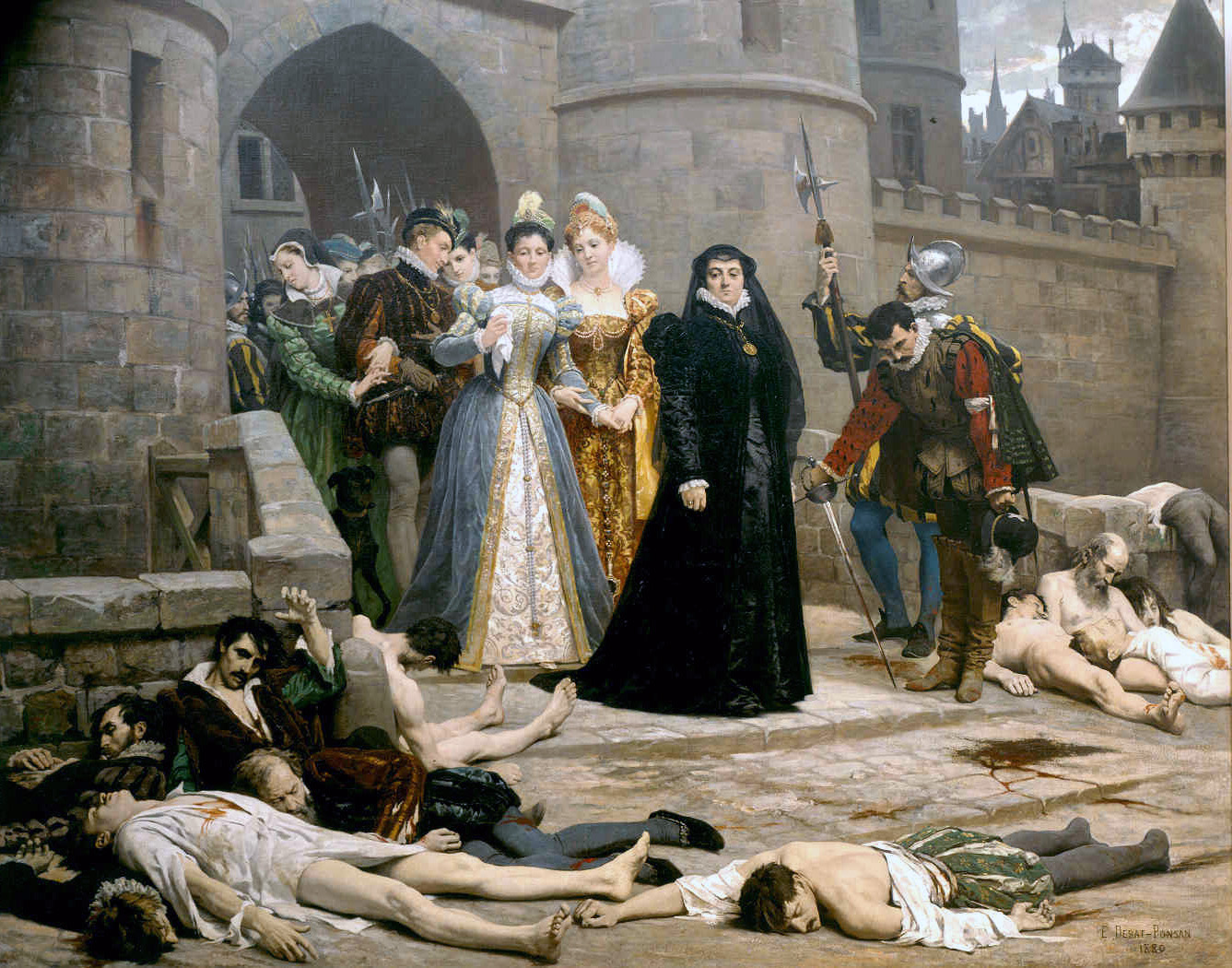
One morning at the gates of the Louvre, 19th-century painting by Édouard Debat-Ponsan. (Catherine de' Medici is in black)

With the kingdom once more at peace, the crown began seeking a policy of reconciliation to bring the fractured polity back together. One key part of this was to be a marriage between Navarre, the son of Jeanne d'Albret and Antoine of Navarre, and Margaret of Valois, the king's sister. Albret was hesitant, worried it might lead to the abjuration of her son, and it took until March 1572 for the contract to be signed.

Coligny, who had a price on his head during the third civil war, was restored to favour through the peace, and received lavishly at court in August 1571. He firmly believed that France should invade the Spanish Netherlands to unify the Catholics and Huguenots behind the king. Charles, however, was unwilling to provide more than covert support to this project, not wanting open war with Spain. The council was unanimous in rejecting Coligny's policy and he left court, not finding it welcoming.

In August, the wedding was finally held, and all the most powerful Huguenot aristocracy had entered Paris for the occasion. A few days after the wedding, Coligny was shot on his way home from council. The outraged Huguenot nobility demanded justice which the king promised to provide. Catherine, Guise, Anjou, and Alba were all variously suspected, though the Huguenot nobility directed their anger primarily at Guise, threatening to kill him in front of the king.

The court, increasingly alarmed at the possibility of Protestant forces marching on the capital, or a new civil war, decided to pre-emptively strike at the Huguenot leadership. On the morning of 24 August (St Bartholomew's Day), several kill squads were formed, one going out under Guise, which killed Coligny around 4am, leaving his body on the street where it was mutilated by Parisians and thrown into the Seine.

By dawn it was clear the assassinations had not gone according to plan, with militant factions of the population slaughtering their Huguenot neighbours under the claim that 'the king willed it'. For the next five days, the violence continued as Catholics massacred Calvinist men, women, and children and looted their houses. King Charles IX informed ambassadors that he had ordered the assassinations to prevent a Huguenot coup and proclaimed a day of jubilee in celebration even as the killings continued. Over the next few weeks, the disorder spread to more than a dozen cities across France. Historians estimate that 2,000 Huguenots were killed in Paris and thousands more in the provinces; in all, perhaps 10,000 people were killed. Henry of Navarre and his cousin, the young Prince of Condé, managed to avoid death by agreeing to convert to Catholicism. Both repudiated their conversions after they escaped Paris.

The massacre provoked horror and outrage among Protestants throughout Europe, but both Philip II of Spain and Pope Gregory XIII, following the official version that a Huguenot coup had been thwarted, celebrated the outcome. In France, Huguenot opposition to the crown was seriously weakened by the deaths of many of the leaders. Many Huguenots emigrated to Protestant countries. Others reconverted to Catholicism for survival, and the remainder concentrated in a small number of cities where they formed a majority.

=== "Fourth" war (1572–1573) ===
The massacres provoked further military action, which included Catholic sieges of the cities of Sommières (by troops led by Henri I de Montmorency), Sancerre, and La Rochelle (by troops led by the duke of Anjou). The end of hostilities was brought on by the election (11–15 May 1573) of the Duke of Anjou to the throne of Poland and by the Edict of Boulogne (signed in July 1573), which severely curtailed many of the rights previously granted to French Protestants. Based on the terms of the treaty, all Huguenots were granted amnesty for their past actions and the freedom of belief. However, they were permitted the freedom to worship only within the three towns of La Rochelle, Montauban, and Nîmes, and even then only within their own residences. Protestant aristocrats with the right of high-justice were permitted to celebrate marriages and baptisms, but only before an assembly limited to ten persons outside of their family.

== 1574–1580 ==
=== Death of Charles IX and the "fifth" war (1574–1576) ===
In the absence of the duke of Anjou, disputes between Charles and his youngest brother, the duke of Alençon, led to many Huguenots congregating around Alençon for patronage and support. A failed coup at Saint-Germain (February 1574), allegedly aiming to release Condé and Navarre who had been held at court since St Bartholemew's, coincided with rather successful Huguenot uprisings in other parts of France such as Lower Normandy, Poitou, and the Rhône valley, which reinitiated hostilities.

Three months after Henry of Anjou's coronation as King of Poland, his brother Charles IX died (May 1574) and his mother declared herself regent until his return. Henry secretly left Poland and returned via Venice to France, where he faced the defection of Montmorency-Damville, ex-commander in the Midi (November 1574). Despite having failed to have established his authority over the Midi, he was crowned King Henry III, at Rheims (February 1575), marrying Louise Vaudémont, a kinswoman of the Guise, the following day. By April, the crown was already seeking to negotiate, and the escape of Alençon from court in September prompted the possibility of an overwhelming coalition of forces against the crown, as John Casimir of the Palatinate invaded Champagne. The crown hastily negotiated a truce of seven months with Alençon and promised Casimir's forces 500,000 livres to stay east of the Rhine, but neither action secured a peace. By May 1576, the crown was forced to accept the terms of Alençon, and the Huguenots who supported him, in the Edict of Beaulieu, known as the Peace of Monsieur.

=== Catholic League and the "sixth" war (1576–1577) ===
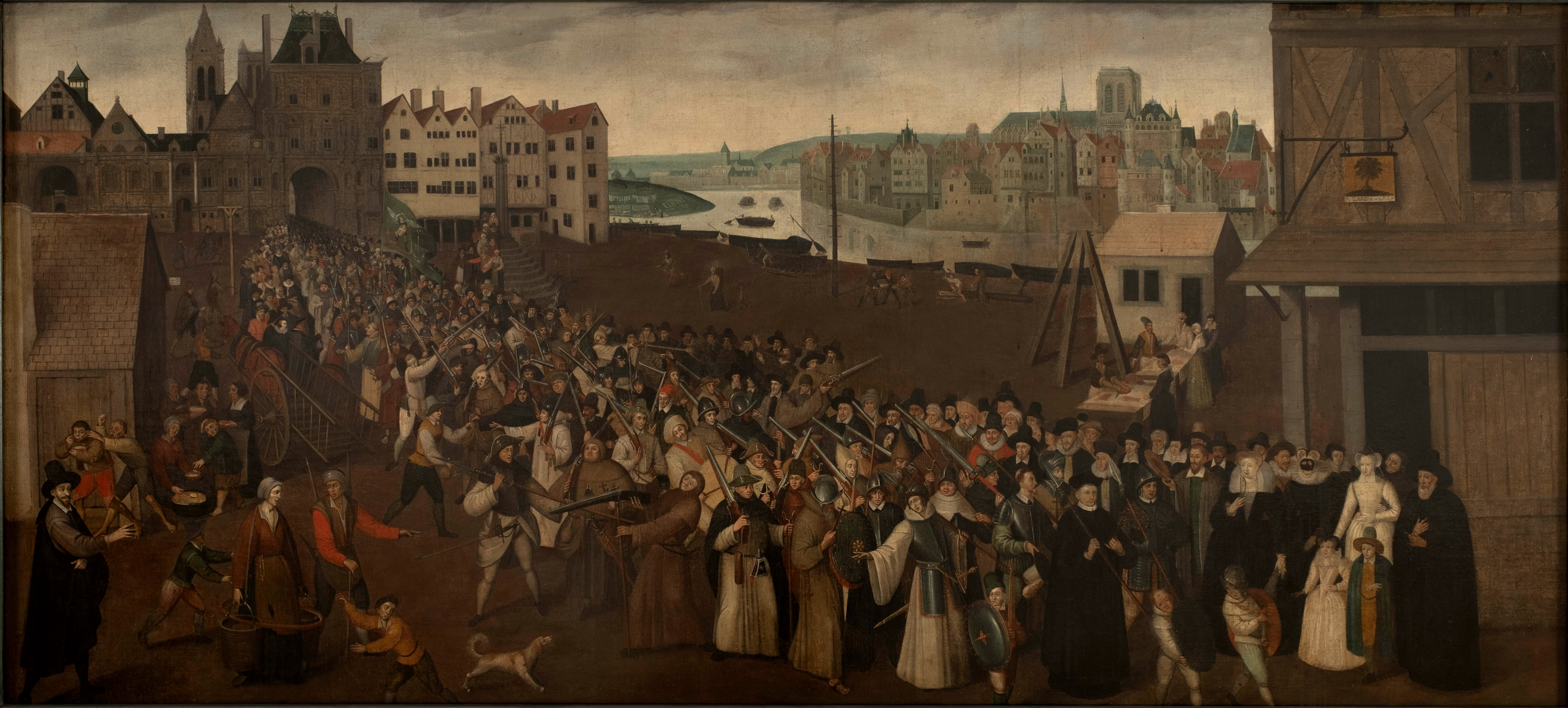
Armed procession of the Catholic League in Paris in 1590, Musée Carnavalet, Paris

The Edict of Beaulieu granted many concessions to the Calvinists, but these were short-lived in the face of the Catholic League – which the ultra-Catholic, Henri I, Duke of Guise, had formed in opposition to it. The House of Guise had long been identified with the defense of the Roman Catholic Church and the Duke of Guise and his relations – the Duke of Mayenne, Duke of Aumale, Duke of Elbeuf, Duke of Mercœur, and the Duke of Lorraine – controlled extensive territories that were loyal to the League. The League also had a large following among the urban middle class.

King Henry III at first tried to co-opt the head of the Catholic League and steer it towards a negotiated settlement. This was anathema to the Guise leaders, who wanted to bankrupt the Huguenots and divide their considerable assets with the King. A test of King Henry III's leadership occurred at the meeting of the Estates-General at Blois in December 1576. At the meeting of the Estates-General, there was only one Huguenot delegate present among all of the three estates; the rest of the delegates were Catholics with the Catholic League heavily represented. Accordingly, the Estates-General pressured Henry III into conducting a war against the Huguenots. In response Henry said he would reopen hostilities with the Huguenots but wanted the Estates-General to vote him the funds to carry out the war. Yet, the Third Estate refused to vote for the necessary taxes to fund this war.

The Estates General of 1576 failed to resolve matters, and by December, the Huguenots had already taken up arms in Poitou and Guyenne. While the Guise faction had the unwavering support of the Spanish Crown, the Huguenots had the advantage of a strong power base in the southwest; they were also discreetly supported by foreign Protestant governments, but in practice, England or the German states could provide few troops in the ensuing conflict. After much posturing and negotiations, Henry III rescinded most of the concessions that had been made to the Protestants in the Edict of Beaulieu with the Treaty of Bergerac (September 1577), confirmed in the Edict of Poitiers passed six days later.

=== "Seventh" war (1579–1580) ===
Despite Henry according his youngest brother Francis the title of Duke of Anjou, the prince and his followers continued to create disorder at court through their involvement in the Dutch Revolt. Meanwhile, the regional situation disintegrated into disorder as both Catholics and Protestants armed themselves in 'self defence'. In November 1579, Condé seized the town of La Fère, leading to another round of military action, which was brought to an end by the Treaty of Fleix (November 1580), negotiated by Anjou.

== War of the Three Henrys (1585–1589) ==
=== Death of Anjou and ensuing succession crisis (1584–1585) ===
The fragile compromise came to an end in 1584, when the Duke of Anjou, the King's youngest brother and heir presumptive, died. As Henry III had no son, under Salic Law, the next heir to the throne was the Calvinist Prince Henry of Navarre, a descendant of Louis IX. When it became clear that Henry of Navarre would not renounce his Protestantism, the Duke of Guise signed the Treaty of Joinville (31 December 1584) on behalf of the League, with Philip II of Spain, who supplied a considerable annual grant to the League over the following decade to maintain the civil war in France, with the hope of destroying the French Calvinists. Under pressure from the Guise, Henry III reluctantly issued the Treaty of Nemours (7 July 1585) and an edict suppressing Protestantism (18 July 1585) and annulling Henry of Navarre's right to the throne.

=== Escalation into war (1585-88) ===
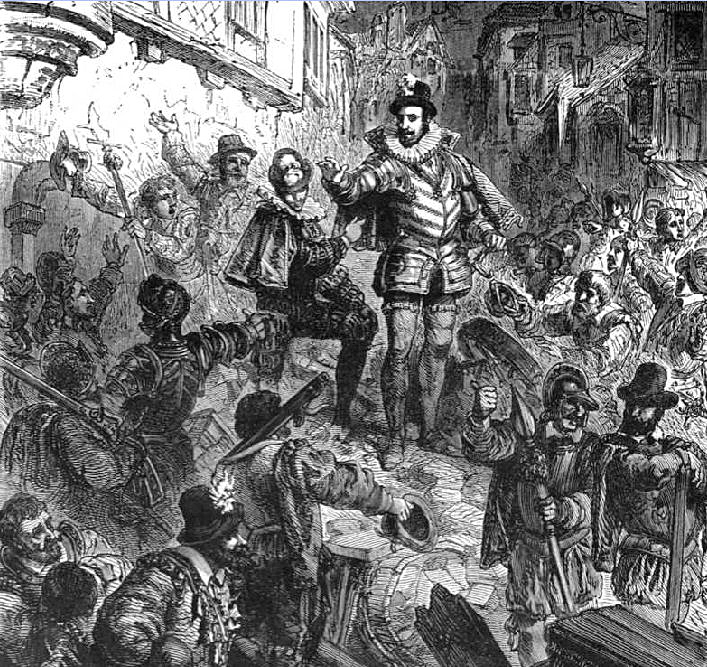
The Duke of Guise during the Day of the Barricades

The situation degenerated into open warfare even without the King having the necessary funds. Henry of Navarre again sought foreign aid from the German princes and Elizabeth I of England. Meanwhile, the solidly Catholic people of Paris, under the influence of the Committee of Sixteen, were becoming dissatisfied with Henry III and his failure to defeat the Calvinists. On 12 May 1588, the Day of the Barricades, a popular uprising raised barricades on the streets of Paris to defend the Duke of Guise against the alleged hostility of the king, and Henry III fled the city. The Committee of Sixteen took complete control of the government, while the Guise protected the surrounding supply lines. The mediation of Catherine de' Medici led to the Edict of Union, in which the crown accepted almost all the League's demands: reaffirming the Treaty of Nemours, recognizing Cardinal de Bourbon as heir, and making Henry of Guise Lieutenant-General.

=== Estates-General of Blois and assassination of Henry of Guise (1588) ===
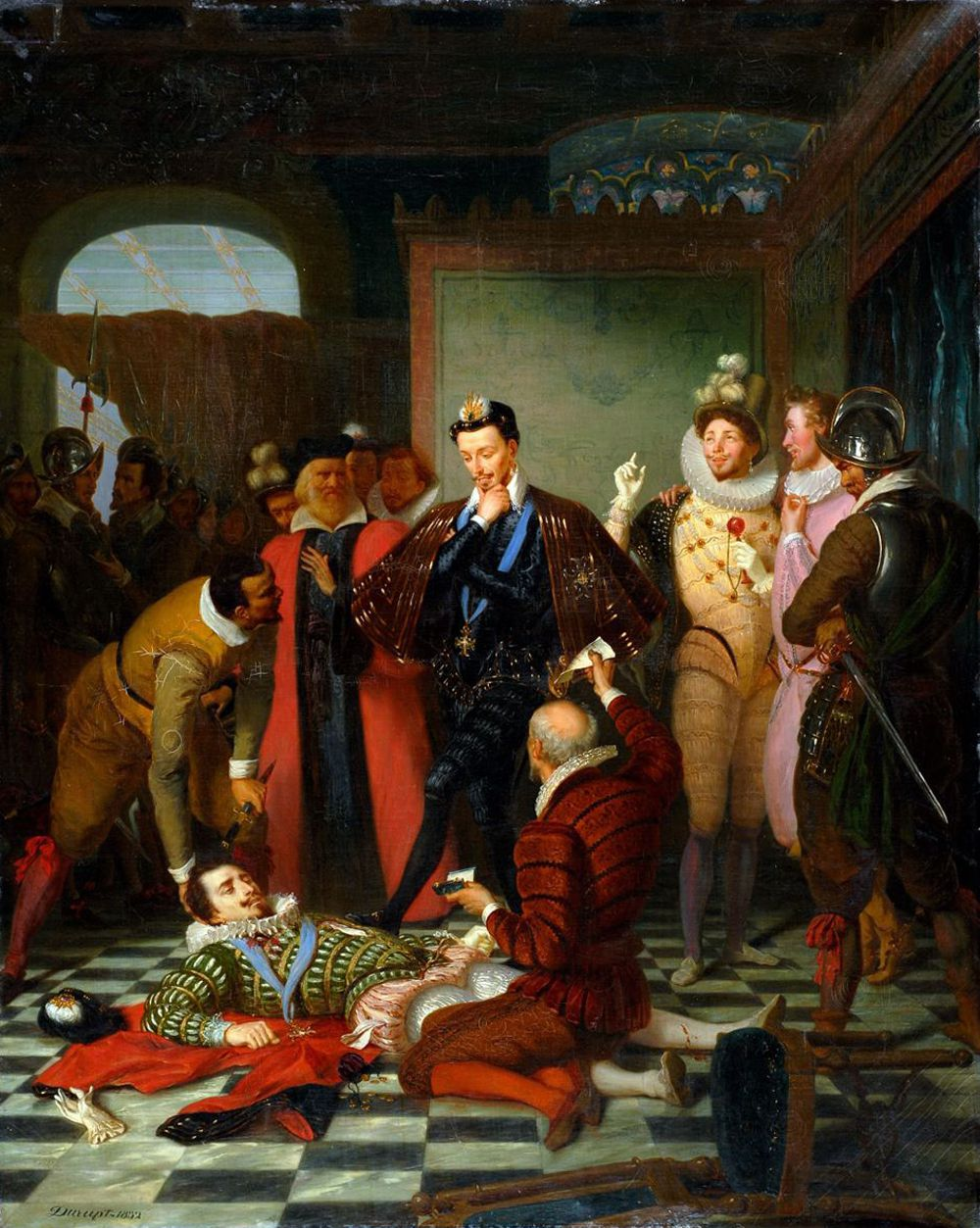
Assassination of the Duke of Guise, leader of the Catholic League, by King Henry III, in 1588

Refusing to return to Paris, Henry III called for an Estates General to meet at Blois. During the Estates-General, Henry III suspected that the members of the third estate were being manipulated by the League and became convinced that Guise had encouraged the Duke of Savoy's invasion of Saluzzo in October 1588. Viewing the House of Guise as a dangerous threat to the power of the Crown, Henry III decided to strike first. On 23 December 1588, at the Château de Blois, Henry of Guise and his brother, the Cardinal de Guise, were lured into a trap by the King's guards. The Duke arrived in the council chamber where his brother the Cardinal waited. The Duke was told that the King wished to see him in the private room adjoining the royal chambers. There guardsmen seized the duke and stabbed him in the heart, while others arrested the Cardinal who later died on the pikes of his escort. To make sure that no contender for the French throne was free to act against him, the King had the Duke's son imprisoned. The Duke of Guise had been highly popular in France, and the Catholic League declared open war against King Henry III. The Sorbonne declared Henri deposed. Henri for his part now joined forces with his cousin, the Huguenot, Henry of Navarre, to war against the League.

=== Assassination of Henry III (1589) ===
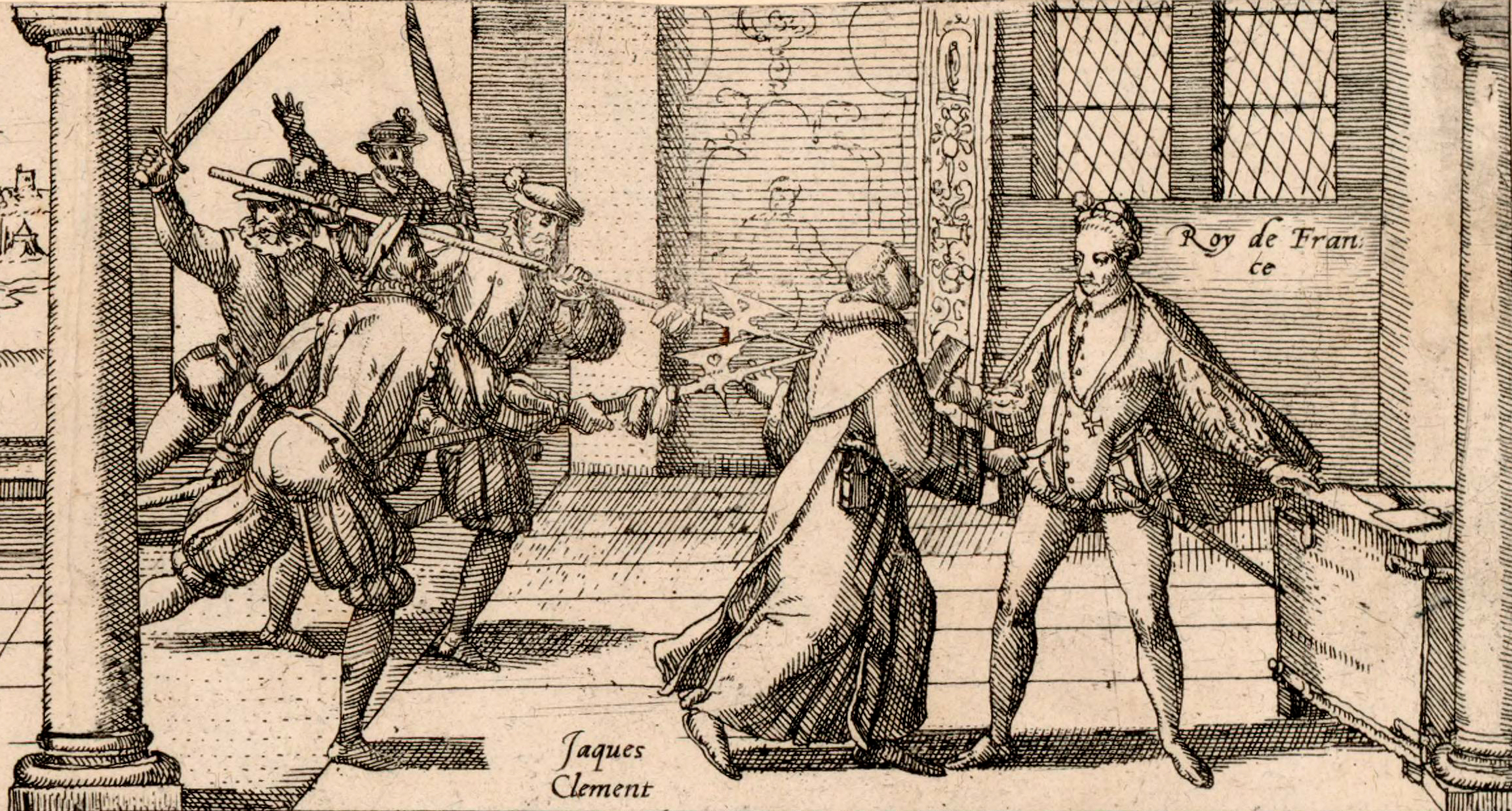
Jacques Clément, a supporter of the Catholic League, assassinating Henry III in 1589

It thus fell upon the younger brother of the Duke of Guise, the Duke of Mayenne, to lead the Catholic League. The League presses began printing anti-royalist tracts under a variety of pseudonyms, while the Sorbonne proclaimed on 7 January 1589 that it was just and necessary to depose Henry III, and that any private citizen was morally free to commit regicide. In July 1589, in the royal camp at Saint-Cloud, a Dominican friar named Jacques Clément gained an audience with the King and drove a long knife into his spleen. Clément was killed on the spot, taking with him the information of who, if anyone, had hired him. On his deathbed, Henry III called for Henry of Navarre, and begged him, in the name of statecraft, to become a Catholic, citing the brutal warfare that would ensue if he refused. In keeping with Salic Law, he named Henry as his heir. However, many Catholics considered Navarre's Protestantism to be unacceptable. Navarre later declared that he would uphold the Catholic faith without changes.

== Henry IV's "conquest of the kingdom" (1589–1593) ==
=== Henry IV versus Parma ===
The state of affairs in 1589 was that Henry of Navarre, now styling himself Henry IV of France, held the south and west, and the Catholic League the north and east. The leadership of the Catholic League had devolved to the Duke de Mayenne, who was appointed Lieutenant-General of the kingdom. He and his troops controlled most of rural Normandy. However, in September 1589, Henry inflicted a severe defeat on the Duke at the Battle of Arques. Henry's army swept through Normandy, taking town after town throughout the winter.

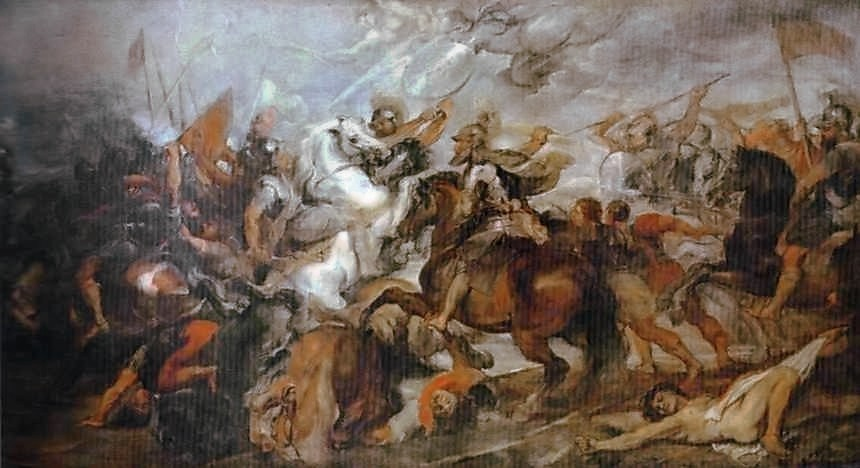
Henry IV at the Battle of Ivry, by Peter Paul Rubens

Henry knew that he had to take Paris if he stood any chance of ruling all of France. This, however, was no easy task. The Catholic League's presses and supporters continued to spread stories about atrocities committed against Catholic priests and the laity in Protestant England (see Forty Martyrs of England and Wales). The city prepared to fight to the death rather than accept a Calvinist king.

The Battle of Ivry, fought on 14 March 1590, was another key victory for Henry against forces led by the Duke of Mayenne. Henry's forces then went on to besiege Paris, but after a long and desperately fought resistance by the Parisians, Henry's siege was lifted by a Spanish army under the command of the Duke of Parma. Then, what had happened at Paris was repeated at Rouen (November 1591 – March 1592).

Parma was subsequently wounded in his upper arm during the Siege of Caudebec whilst trapped by Henry's army. Although Parma's army managed to escape to Flanders, with his son Ranuccio commanding his troops, his campaign was a failure. He was removed from the position of governor by the Spanish court, and died in Arras on 3 December 1593 from his wound. For Henry and the Protestant army at least, Parma was no longer a threat.

=== Early Brittany campaign (1590–1594) ===
Meanwhile, Philippe Emmanuel, Duke of Mercœur, whom Henry III had made governor of Brittany in 1582, was endeavouring to make himself independent in that province. A leader of the Catholic League, he invoked the hereditary rights of his wife, Marie de Luxembourg, who was a descendant of the dukes of Brittany and heiress of the Blois-Brosse claim to the duchy as well as Duchess of Penthièvre in Brittany, and organized a government at Nantes. Proclaiming his son "prince and duke of Brittany", he allied with Philip II of Spain, who sought to place his own daughter, infanta Isabella Clara Eugenia, on the throne of Brittany. With the aid of the Spanish under Juan del Águila, Mercœur defeated Henry IV's forces under the Duke of Montpensier at the Battle of Craon in 1592, but the royal troops, reinforced by English contingents, soon recovered the advantage; in September 1594, Martin Frobisher and John Norris with eight warships and 4,000 men besieged Fort Crozon, also known as the "Fort of the Lion (El León)" near Brest and captured it on November 7, killing 400 Spaniards including women and children as only 13 survived.

== Toward peace (1593–1598) ==
=== Conversion ===
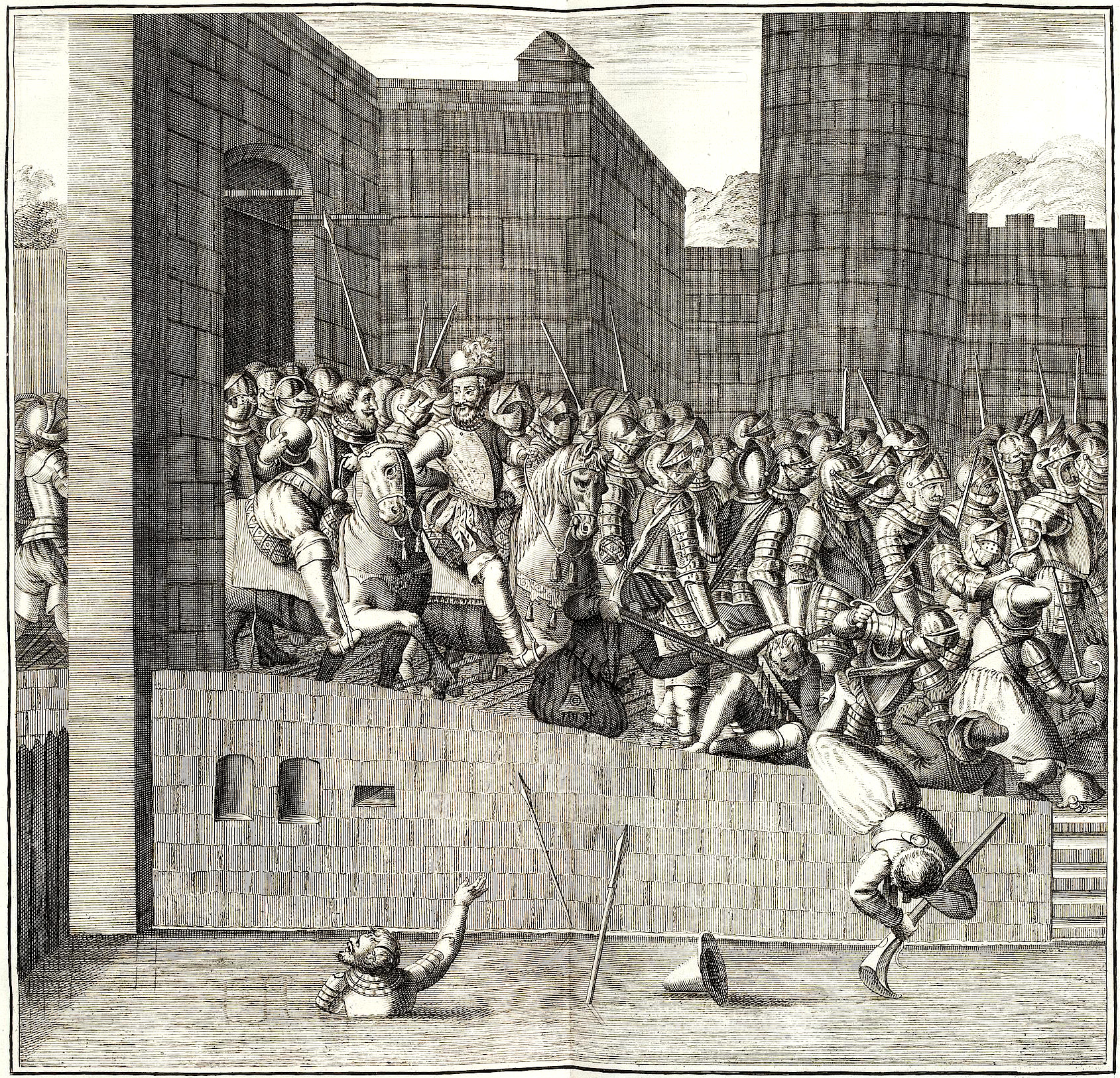
Entrance of Henry IV in Paris, 22 March 1594, with 1,500 cuirassiers

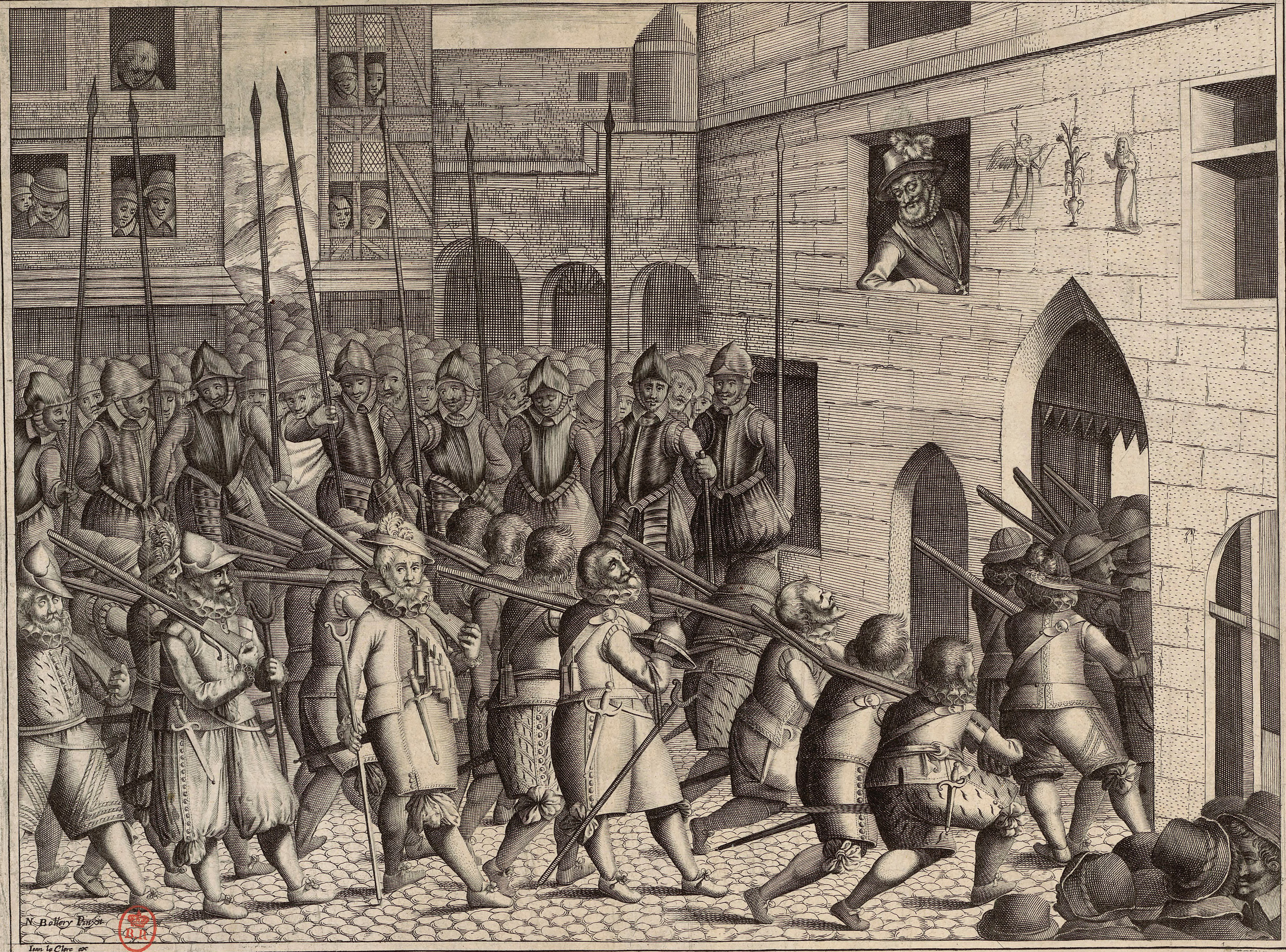
Departure of Spanish troops from Paris, 22 March 1594

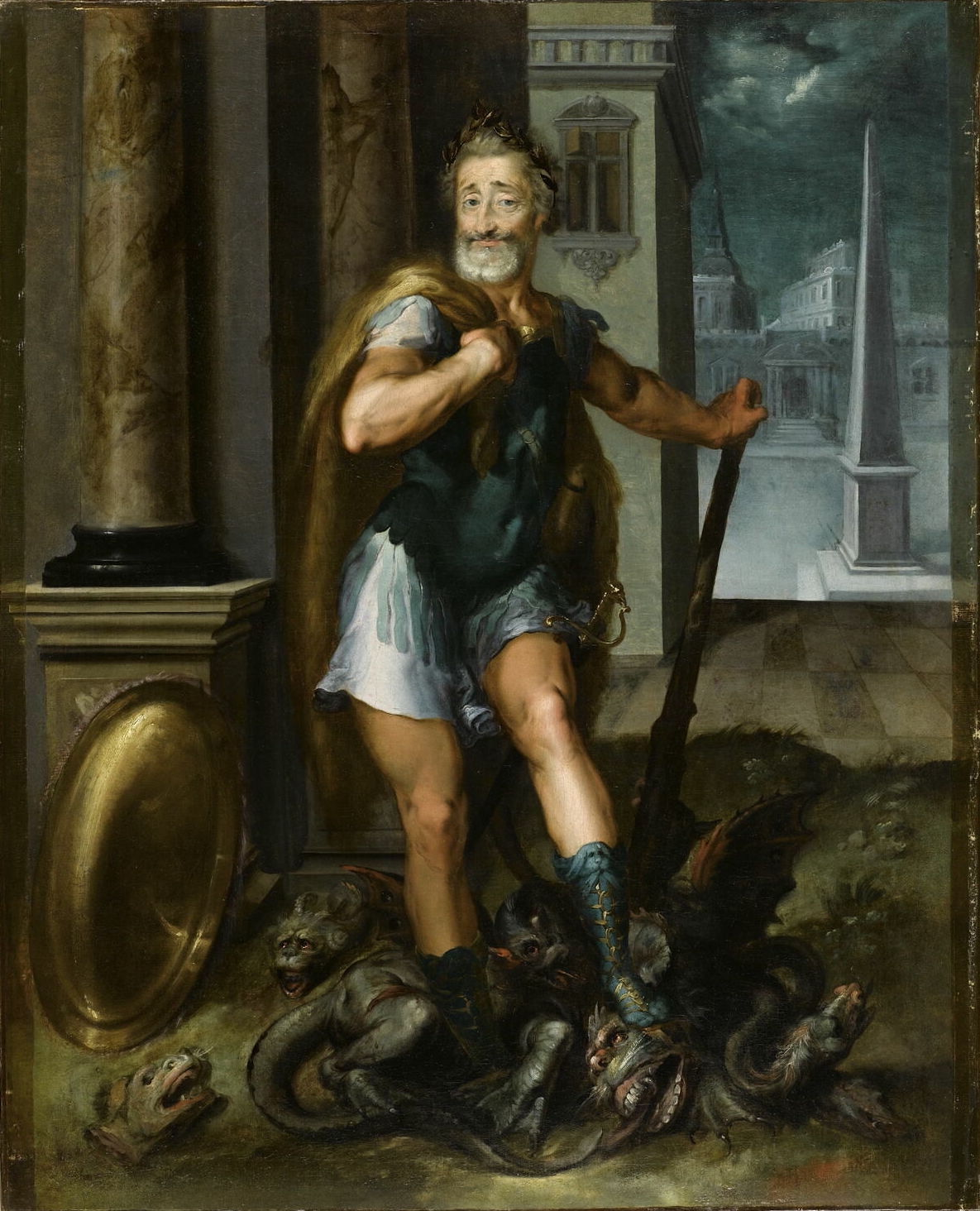
Henry IV, as Hercules vanquishing the Lernaean Hydra (i.e. the Catholic League), by Toussaint Dubreuil, circa 1600. Louvre Museum.

Despite the campaigns between 1590 and 1592, Henry IV was "no closer to capturing Paris". Realising that Henry III had been right and that there was no prospect of a Protestant king succeeding in resolutely Catholic Paris, Henry agreed to convert, reputedly stating "Paris vaut bien une messe" ("Paris is well worth a mass"). Henry's abjuration of the Protestant faith on 25 July 1593 at the Abbey of Saint-Denis proved decisive in winning over many of his opponents. He was formally received into the Catholic Church later in 1593, and was crowned king on 27 February 1594 at Chartres Cathedral, as League members maintained control of the Cathedral of Reims, and, sceptical of Henry's sincerity, continued to oppose him. He was finally received into Paris in March 1594, and 120 League members in the city who refused to submit were banished from the capital. Paris' capitulation encouraged the same of many other towns, while others returned to support the crown after Pope Clement VIII absolved Henry, revoking his excommunication in return for the publishing of the Tridentine Decrees, the restoration of Catholicism in Béarn, and appointing only Catholics to high office. Evidently Henry's conversion worried Protestant nobles, many of whom had, until then, hoped to win not just concessions but a complete reformation of the French Church, and their acceptance of Henry was by no means a foregone conclusion.

=== War with Spain (1595–1598) ===
By the end of 1594, certain League members still worked against Henry across the country, but all relied on Spain's support. In January 1595, the king declared war on Spain to show Catholics that Spain was using religion as a cover for an attack on the French state – and to show Protestants that his conversion had not made him a puppet of Spain. Also, he hoped to reconquer large parts of northern France from the Franco-Spanish Catholic forces. The conflict mostly consisted of military action aimed at League members, such as the Battle of Fontaine-Française, though the Spanish launched a concerted offensive in 1595, taking Le Catelet, Doullens and Cambrai (the latter after a fierce bombardment), and in the spring of 1596 capturing Calais by April. Following the Spanish capture of Amiens in March 1597 the French crown laid siege until its surrender in September. With that victory Henry's concerns then turned to the situation in Brittany where he promulgated the Edict of Nantes and sent Bellièvre and Brulart de Sillery to negotiate a peace with Spain. The war was drawn to an official close after the Edict of Nantes, with the Peace of Vervins in May 1598.

=== Resolution of the war in Brittany (1598–1599) ===
In early 1598, the king marched against Mercœur in person, and received his submission at Angers on 20 March 1598. Mercœur subsequently went to exile in Hungary. Mercœur's daughter and heiress was married to the Duke of Vendôme, an illegitimate son of Henry IV.

== Edict of Nantes (1598) ==
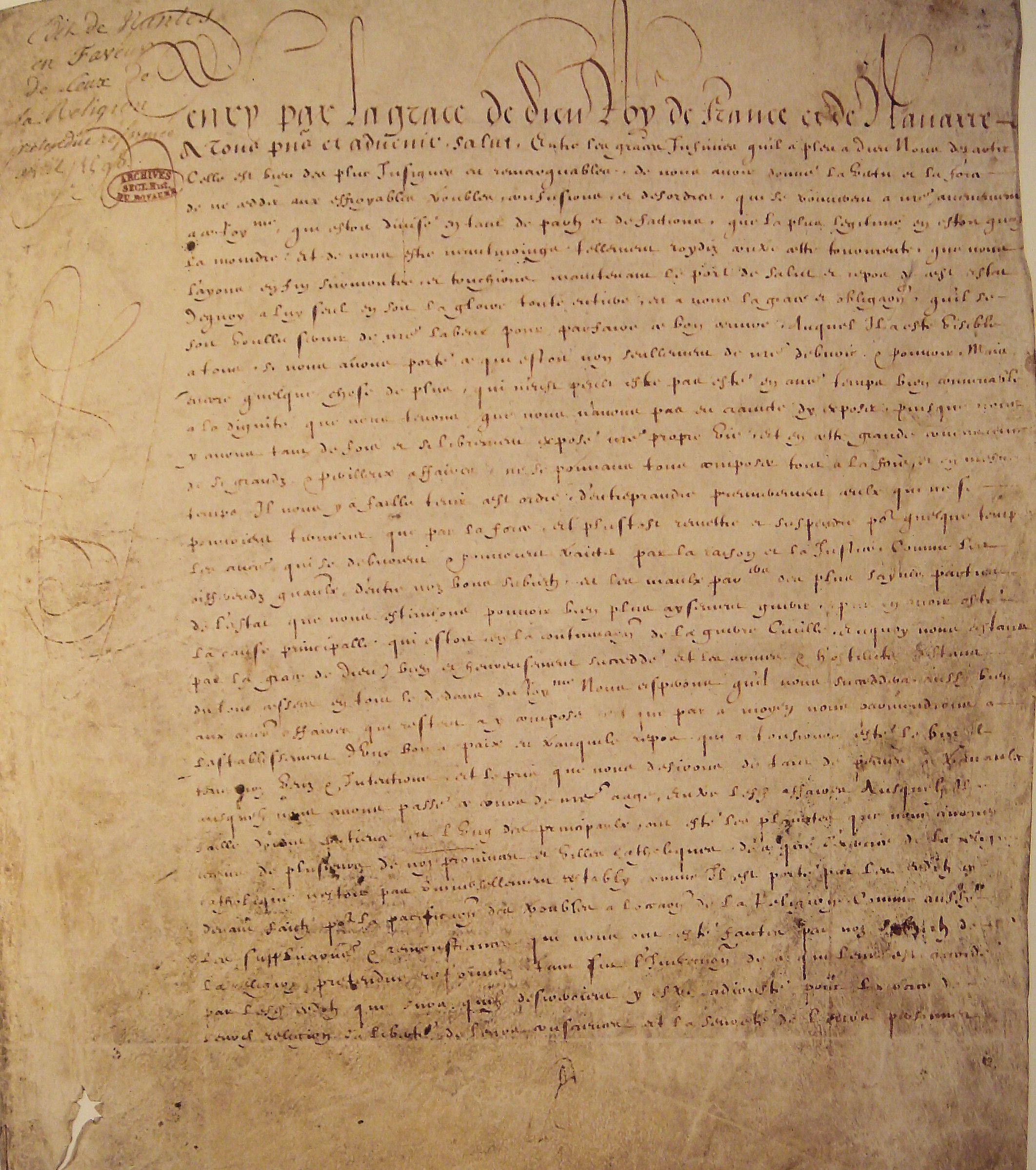
The Edict of Nantes, April 1598

Henry IV was faced with the task of rebuilding a shattered and impoverished kingdom and uniting it under a single authority. Henry and his advisor, the Duke of Sully saw that the essential first step in this was the negotiation of the Edict of Nantes, which to promote civil unity granted the Huguenots substantial rights – but rather than being a sign of genuine toleration, was in fact a kind of grudging truce between the religions, with guarantees for both sides. The Edict can be said to mark the end of the Wars of Religion, though its apparent success was not assured at the time of its publication. Indeed, in January 1599, Henry had to visit the parlement in person to have the Edict passed. Religious tensions continued to affect politics for many years to come, though never to the same degree, and Henry IV faced many attempts on his life; the last succeeding in May 1610.

== Aftermath ==
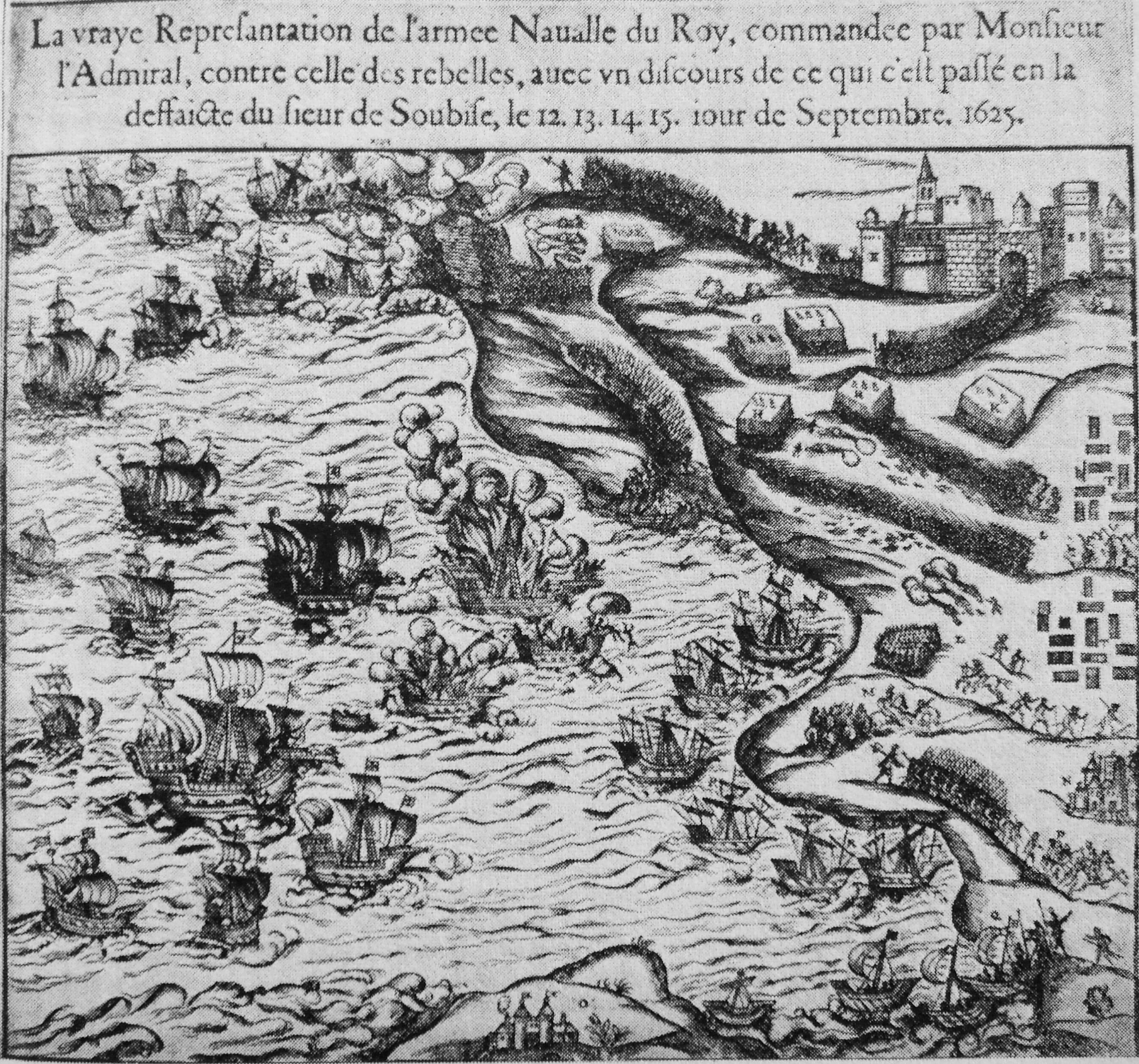
The French royal fleet captures the Île de Ré, a Huguenot stronghold

Although the Edict of Nantes concluded the fighting during Henry IV's reign, the political freedoms it granted to the Huguenots (seen by detractors as "a state within the state") became an increasing source of trouble during the 17th century. Hans Joachim Hillerbrand estimated that the Huguenots declined from 10% of the French population before the St. Bartholomew's Day massacre to 7-8% by the end of the 16th century. The decision of King Louis XIII to reintroduce Catholicism in a portion of southwestern France prompted a Huguenot revolt. By the Peace of Montpellier in 1622, the fortified Protestant towns were reduced to two: La Rochelle and Montauban. Another war followed, which concluded with the Siege of La Rochelle, in which royal forces led by Cardinal Richelieu blockaded the city for fourteen months. Under the 1629 Peace of La Rochelle, the brevets of the Edict (sections of the treaty that dealt with military and pastoral clauses and were renewable by letters patent) were entirely withdrawn, though Protestants retained their prewar religious freedoms.

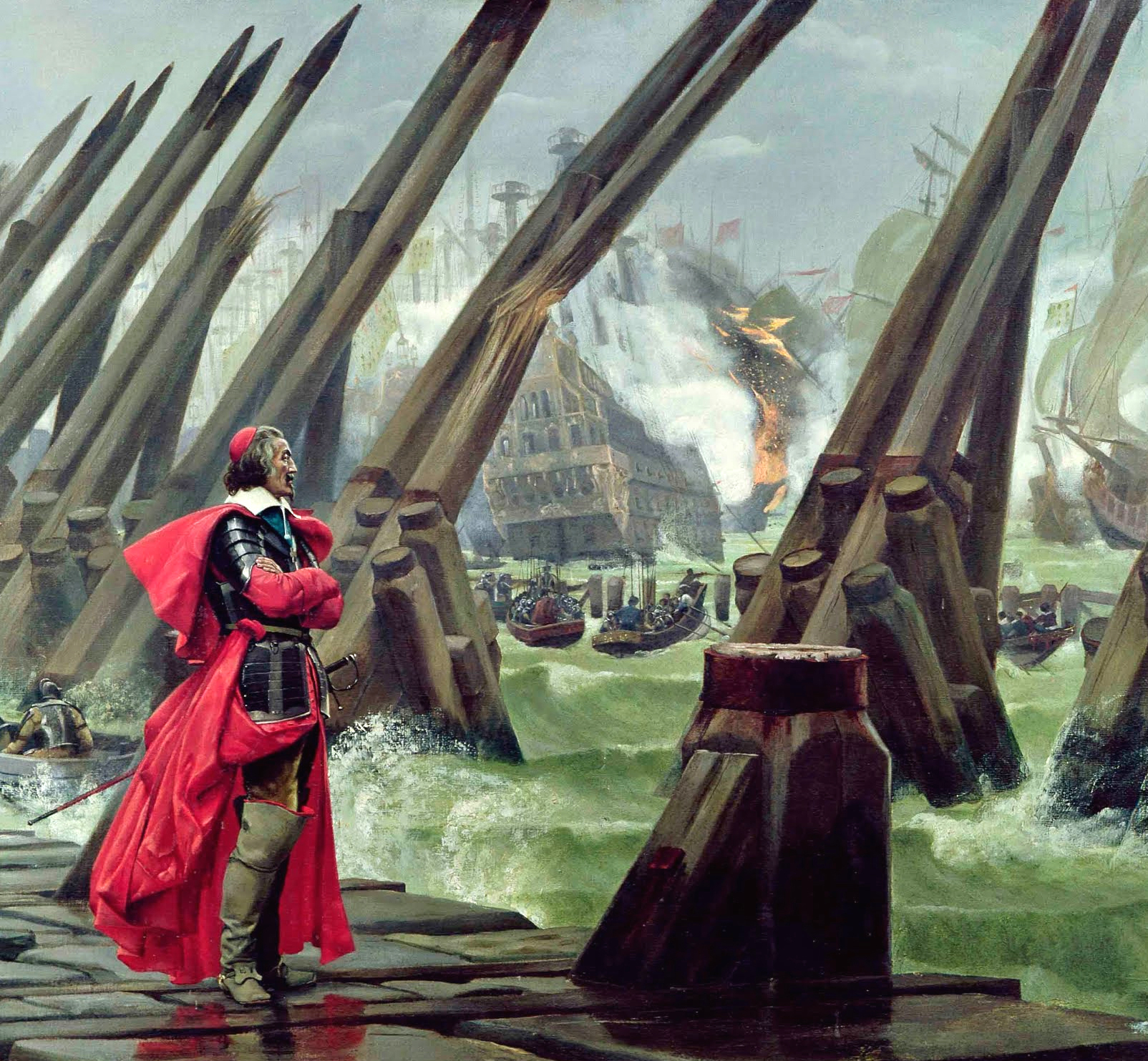
Richelieu, depicted at the 1627–1628 Siege of La Rochelle, put an end to the political and military autonomy of the Huguenots, while preserving their religious rights.

Over the remainder of Louis XIII's reign, and especially during the minority of Louis XIV, the implementation of the Edict varied year by year. In 1661 Louis XIV, who was particularly hostile to the Huguenots, started assuming control of his government and began to disregard some of the provisions of the Edict. In 1681, he instituted the policy of dragonnades, to intimidate Huguenot families to convert to Roman Catholicism or emigrate. Finally, in October 1685, Louis issued the Edict of Fontainebleau, which formally revoked the Edict and made the practice of Protestantism illegal in France. The revocation of the Edict had very damaging results for France. While it did not prompt renewed religious warfare, many Protestants chose to leave France rather than convert, with most moving to the Kingdom of England, Brandenburg-Prussia, the Dutch Republic, Switzerland and the Americas.

At the dawn of the 18th century, Protestants remained in significant numbers in the remote Cévennes region of the Massif Central. This population, known as the Camisards, revolted against the government in 1702, leading to fighting that continued intermittently until 1710, ending with the defeat of the rebels. However, Protestantism persisted in the Cévennes even after the war's end. In 1787, the Edict of Versailles restored some civil rights to non-Catholics in France.

== Chronology ==
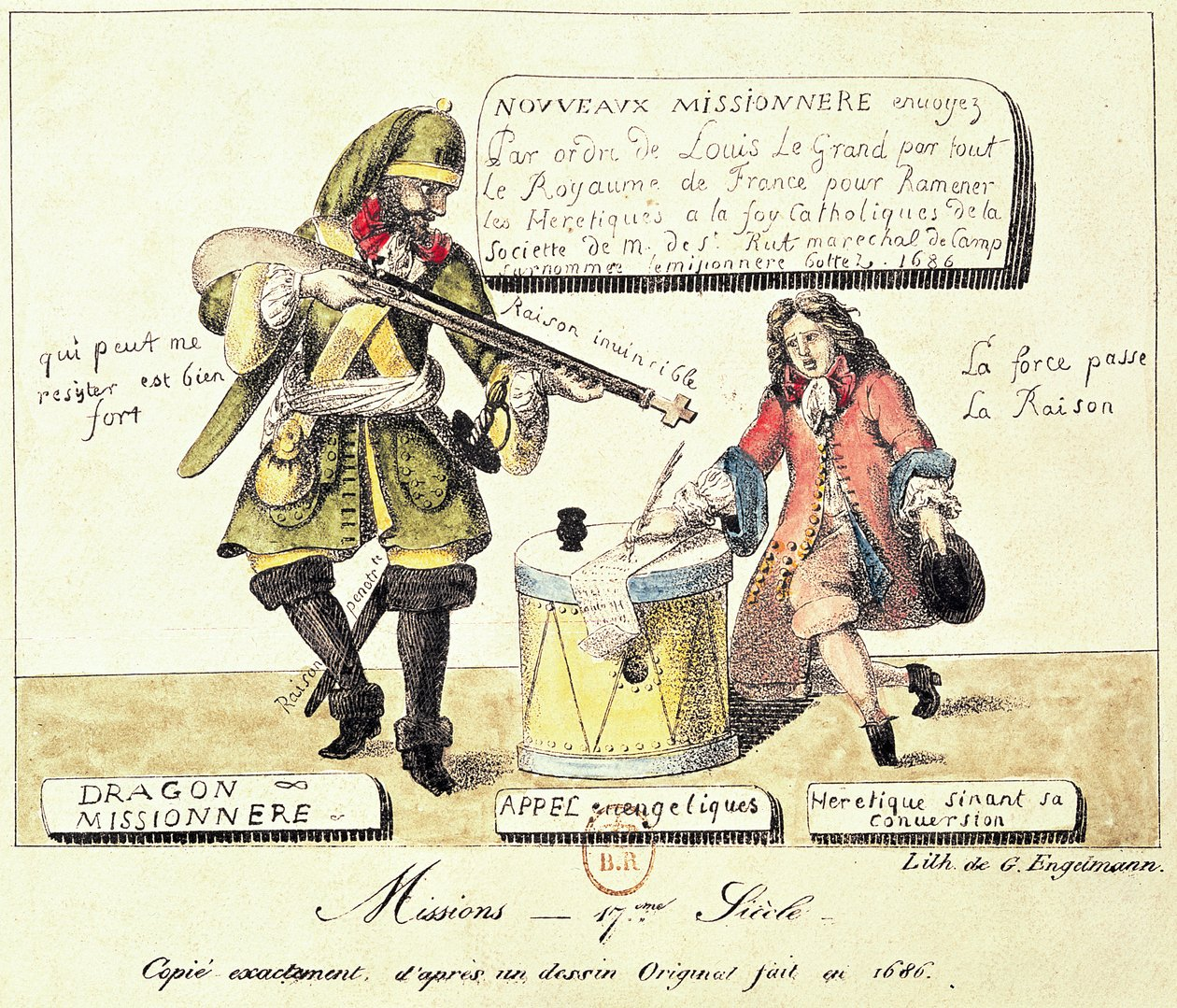
Protestant engraving representing 'les dragonnades' in France under Louis XIV

- 17 January 1562: Edict of Saint-Germain, often called the "Edict of January"
- 1 March 1562: Massacre of Vassy (Wassy)
- March 1562 – March 1563: usually known as the "First War", ended by the Edict of Amboise
  - 19 December 1562: Battle of Dreux
- September 1567 – March 1568: usually known as the "Second War", ended by the Peace of Longjumeau
  - 10 November 1567: Battle of Saint Denis
- September 1568 – August 1570: usually known as the "Third War", ended by the Peace of Saint-Germain-en-Laye
  - 13 March 1569: Battle of Jarnac
  - 25 June 1569: Battle of La Roche-l'Abeille
  - 3 October 1569: Battle of Moncontour
- 1572:
  - 9 June: Death of Jeanne d'Albret
  - 22 August: Attempted assassination of Gaspard II de Coligny
  - 24 - 27 August: St. Bartholomew's Day massacre
  - August - October: St. Bartholomew's Day massacre in the provinces
- August 1572 – July 1573: usually known as the "Fourth War", ended by the Edict of Boulogne
  - February – 2 July 1573: Siege of La Rochelle
  - 16 May 1573: Henry d'Anjou elected King of Poland
- 30 May 1574: Death of Charles IX
- November 1574 – May 1576: usually known as the "Fifth War", ended by the Edict of Beaulieu
- 1576: Formation of the first Catholic League in France
- December 1576 - September 1577: usually known as the "Sixth War", ended by the Treaty of Bergerac (also known as the "Edict of Poitiers")
- May - November 1580: usually known as the "Seventh War", ended by the Treaty of Fleix. Sometimes also known as the "Lovers' War"
- 10 June 1584: Death of Francis, Duke of Anjou, heir presumptive
- December 1584: Treaty of Joinville
- 7 July 1585: Treaty of Nemours
- September 1585: Pope Sixtus V excommunicated Henry of Navarre and Henri I, Prince of Condé
- 1585–1598: sometimes known as the "Eighth War". It can be subdivided in three periods:
  - 1585–1589: usually known as the War of the Three Henrys, sometimes also known as the "Eighth War"
    - 1585: Philippe Emmanuel, Duke of Mercœur invaded Poitou, was defeated by Condé in the battle of Fontenay-le-Comte
    - October 1585: Failed siege of Brouage by Condé
    - October 1585: Castle of Angers fell in royalist hands, Condé's army scattered
    - January 1586: Henry of Navarre issued pacifist proclamations while rebuilding his army
    - February 1586: Condé captured La Rochelle and Oléron
    - April 1586: Failed royalist attack on La Rochelle
    - Late 1586: Royalist siege of Marans
    - Late 1586: Henry III called on parties to cease hostilities for peace talks, which broke down
    - 20 October 1587: Battle of Coutras
    - 26 October 1587: Battle of Vimory
    - 24 November 1587: Battle of Auneau
    - 12 May 1588: Day of the Barricades. Catholic League seized control of Paris from Henry III, who fled to Chartres
    - July 1588: Edict of Union, Henry III submits to Henry of Guise and the Sixteen
    - October 1588 - January 1589: Estates General
      - 23-24 December 1588: Assassination of the Duke Henry of Guise and his brother Cardinal Louis of Guise on the orders of Henry III
    - 3 April 1589: Henry III and Henry of Navarre signed a truce and an alliance against the Catholic League, and started besieging Paris
    - 1 August 1589: Assassination of Henry III; by Salic law, Henry of Navarre formally became King Henry IV of France, but most Catholics initially refused to recognise him as such
  - 1589–1594: sometimes taken together with the 1594–1598 period as the "Ninth War"
    - 21 September 1589: Battle of Arques
    - 14 March 1590: Battle of Ivry
    - 7 April – 30 August 1590: Siege of Paris by Henry IV
    - 9 May 1590: Charles de Bourbon (cardinal), considered the rightful King Charles X of France by the Catholic League, died in Henry IV's custody
    - 19 September 1590: Spanish general Alexander Farnese, Duke of Parma intervened and relieved Paris; this allowed the Dutch Republic to go on the offensive in the Habsburg Netherlands
    - March 1591: Pope Gregory XIV excommunicated Henry IV for a second time
    - November 1591 – 21 April 1592: Siege of Rouen (1591–1592)
    - 30 April – 21 May 1592: Siege of Caudebec
    - 25 July 1593: Henry IV abjured Protestantism and reconverted to Catholicism
    - 27 February 1594: Henry IV crowned in Chartres
    - 22 March 1594: Paris surrendered to Henry IV
  - 1595–1598: sometimes known simply as the "Franco-Spanish War of 1595–1598", sometimes also taken together with the 1589–1594 period as the "Ninth War"
    - 17 January 1595: Henry IV of France declared war on Philip II of Spain after discovering another Spanish plot to invade France
    - 5 June 1595: Battle of Fontaine-Française
    - April–September 1597: Siege of Amiens
    - April 1598: Edict of Nantes issued by Henry IV
    - 2 May 1598: Peace of Vervins between France and Spain

Epilogue

- 14 May 1610: Assassination of Henry IV of France
- 1621–1629: Huguenot rebellions, sometimes also known as the "last war of religion"
- October 1685: Edict of Fontainebleau issued by Louis XIV, revoking the Edict of Nantes.

== See also ==
- Edict of toleration
- Monarchomachs
- Religion in France
- Virtual Museum of Protestantism
- Siege of Paris (1590)
- Catholic League (French)
- Battle of Craon
- Franco-Spanish War

== Sources ==
- Acton, John (1906). "The Huguenots and the League" . Lectures on Modern History . New York: Macmillan. pp. 155–167.
- Audisio, Gabriel (1998). Les Vaudois: Histoire d'une dissidence XIIe – XVIe siecle (in French). Fayard.
- Baird, Henry (1880). History of the Rise of the Huguenots: Vol 2 of 2. Hodder & Stoughton.
- Baird, H. M. (1889). History of the Rise of the Huguenots of France. Vol. 1.
- ——— (1889). History of the Rise of the Huguenots of France. Vol. 2. New edition, two volumes, New York, 1907.
- Baird, H. M. (1895). The Huguenots and the Revocation of the Edict of Nantes. C. Scribner's sons.
- Baumgartner, Frederic (1988). Henry II: King of France 1547–1559. Duke University Press.
- Babelon, Jean-Pierre (2009). Henri IV. Fayard.
- Benedict, Philip (1996). "Un roi, une loi, deux fois: Parameters for the History of Catholic-Protestant Co-existence in France, 1555–1685". In Grell, O. & Scribner, B. (eds.). Tolerance and Intolerance in the European Reformation. New York: Cambridge University Press. pp. 65–93. ISBN 0521496942.
- Benedict, Philip (1978). "The Saint Bartholomew's Massacre in the Provinces". The Historical Journal. 21 2.
- Benedict, Philip (1999). "The Dynamics of Protestant Militancy: France 1555–1563". In Benedict, P; Marnef, G; van Nierop, H; Venard, M (eds.). Reformation, Revolt and Civil War in France and the Netherlands 1555–1585. Royal Netherlands Academy of Arts and Sciences.
- Bernstein, Paul; Green, Robert W (1988). History of Civilization Volume 1. Rowman & Littlefield.
- Bryson, David (1999). Queen Jeanne and the Promised Land; Dynasty, Homeland, Religion and Violence in Sixteenth-Century France. Brill Publishing. ISBN 978-9004247512.
- Cairns, Earl (1996). Christianity through the Centuries: A History of the Christian Church. Zondervan. ISBN 978-0310208129.
- Di Bondeno, Agostino (2018). Colloqui di Poissy. Rome: Albatros. ISBN 978-8856793192.
- Carroll, Stuart (2005). Noble Power During the French Wars of Religion: The Guise Affinity and the Catholic Cause in Normandy. Cambridge University Press.
- Carroll, Stuart (2009). Martyrs and Murderers: The Guise Family and the Making of Europe. Oxford University Press.
- ——— (2019). "Political Justice and the Outbreak of the Wars of Religion". French History. 33 (2): 177–198. doi:10.1093/fh/crz009.
- Castelnau, Michel de (1724). Memoirs of the Reigns of Francis II and Charles IX (2012 ed.). Rarebooks.com.
- Clodfelter, Micheal (2017). Warfare and Armed Conflicts: A Statistical Encyclopedia of Casualty and Other Figures, 1492–2015 (4th ed.). Jefferson, North Carolina: McFarland. pp. 14–16, 537. ISBN 978-0786474707.
- Cloulas, Ivan (1979). Catherine de Médicis. Fayard.
- Constant, Jean-Marie (1984). Les Guise. Hachette.
- Constant, Jean-Marie (1996). La Ligue. Fayard.
- Cottret, Bernard (2000). Calvin: A Biography. Translated by McDonald, M Wallace. Wm. B. Eerdmans. ISBN 0802831591.
- De Caprariis, Vittorio (1959). Propaganda e pensiero politico in Francia durante le guerre di religione (1559–1572). Napoli: Società Editrice Italiana.
- Diefendorf, Barbara B. (1991). Beneath the Cross: Catholics and Huguenots in Sixteenth-Century Paris. Oxford: Oxford University Press. ISBN 0195065549.
- Davis, Natalie Zemon (1975). Society and Culture in Early Modern France. Stanford: Stanford University Press. ISBN 0804708681.
- Durot, Éric (2012). François de Lorraine, duc de Guise entre Dieu et le Roi. Classiques Garnier. ISBN 978-2812406102.
- Estebe, Janine (1968). Tocsin pour une Massacre: La Saison des Saint-Barthélemy. Éditions du Centurion.
- Frieda, Leonie (2005). Catherine de Medici. Phoenix. ISBN 978-0060744922.
- Frieda, Leonie (2006) [2004]. Catherine de Medici: Renaissance Queen of France. Weidenfeld and Nicolson. ISBN 978-1842127254.
- Garnier, Edith (2008). L'Alliance Impie (in French). Editions du Felin.
- Greengrass, Mark (1986). France in the Age of Henry IV. Longman. ISBN 0582492513.
- ——— (1987). The French Reformation. London: Blackwell. ISBN 0631145168.
- ——— (2007). Governing Passions: Peace and Reform in the French Kingdom, 1576–1585. Oxford: Oxford University Press. ISBN 978-0199214907.
- Grimm, Harold (1973) [1965]. The Reformation Era 1500–1650. Macmillan. ISBN 978-0023472701.
- Guérard, Albert (1959). France: A Modern History. University of Michigan Press.
- Hamilton, Sarah; Spicer, Andrew (2005). Defining the holy: Sacred space in medieval and early modern Europe. Ashgate Publishing. ISBN 0754651940.
- Holt, Mack (2002). The Duke of Anjou and the Politique Struggle During the Wars of Religion. Cambridge University Press.
- Holt, Mack P. (2005). The French wars of religion, 1562–1629. Cambridge University Press. ISBN 052183872X.
- Hulme, E. M. (1914). The Renaissance, the Protestant Revolution, and the Catholic Reaction in Continental Europe. New York: The Century Company.
- Jouanna, Arlette; Boucher, Jacqueline; Biloghi, Dominique; Thiec, Guy (1998). Histoire et dictionnaire des Guerres de religion. Collection: Bouquins (in French). Paris: Laffont. ISBN 2221074254.
- Jouanna, Arlette (2007). The St Bartholomew's Day Massacre: The Mysteries of a Crime of State. Manchester University Press.
- Kiser, Edward; Drass, Kriss A.; Brustein, William (1994). "The relationship between revolt and war in early modern Western Europe". Journal of Political & Military Sociology. 22 (2). University Press of Florida: 323–324. JSTOR 45371312.
- Knecht, Robert J. (1996). The French Wars of Religion 1559–1598 (2nd ed.). Longman. ISBN 058228533X.
- ——— (2010). The French Wars of Religion, 1559–1598. Routledge.
- ——— (2000). The French Civil Wars. Modern Wars in Perspective. New York: Longman. ISBN 0582095492.
- ——— (2001). The Rise and Fall of Renaissance France 1483–1610. Oxford: Blackwell. ISBN 0631227296.
- ——— (2002). The French Religious Wars 1562–1598. Osprey Publishing. ISBN 978-1841763958.
- ——— (2007). The Valois: Kings of France 1328–1589 (2nd ed.). New York: Hambledon Continuum. ISBN 978-1852855222.
- ——— (2014). Catherine de' Medici. Routledge.
- ——— (2014a). The French Wars of Religion 1559-1598 (3rd ed.). Oxford, UK: Routledge. ISBN 978-1-138-41830-1.
- ——— (2014b). The French Civil Wars, 1562–1598. Routledge. ISBN 978-1-317-89510-7.
- ——— (2016). Hero or Tyrant? Henry III, King of France, 1574–1589. Routledge.
- Kohn, George Childs (2013). Dictionary of Wars. Revised Edition. Londen/New York: Routledge. ISBN 978-1135954949.
- Le Roux, Nicolas (2006). Un Régicide au nom de Dieu: L'Assassinat d'Henri III. Gallimard.
- van der Lem, Anton (2019). Revolt in the Netherlands: The Eighty Years War, 1568–1648. London: Reaktion Books. p. 143. ISBN 978-1789140880.
- Lindberg, Carter (1996). The European Reformations (2009 ed.). Wiley Publishing. ISBN 978-1405180689.
- Lindsay, T. M. (1906). A History of the Reformation. Vol. 1. T and T Clark.
- ——— (1907). A History of the Reformation. Vol. 2.
- Mallett, Michael; Shaw, Christine (2012). The Italian Wars: 1494–1559. Pearson Education. ISBN 978-0582057586.
- McGrath, Alister (1995). The Intellectual Origins of the European Reformation (2003 ed.). John Wiley & Sons. ISBN 978-0631229407.
- Monahan, W. Gregory (2014). Let God Arise: The War and Rebellion of the Camisards. Oxford University Press. ISBN 9780191767708.
- Nicholls, Sophie (2021). Political Thought in the French Wars of Religion. Cambridge University Press. ISBN 9781108887786.
- Nolan, Cathal J. (2006). The Age of Wars of Religion, 1000–1650: An Encyclopedia of Global Warfare and Civilization, Volume 2. London: Greenwood Publishing Group. p. 1076. ISBN 978-0313337345.
- Pearson, Hesketh, Henry of Navarre: The King Who Dared (New York: Harper & Rowe, Publishers, 1963).
- Pitts, Vincent (2012). Henri IV of France: His Reign and Age. Johns Hopkins University Press.
- Rady, Martyn (1991). France: Renaissance, Religion and Recovery, 1494–1610. Hodder Education. ISBN 978-0340518045.
- Roberts, Penny (1996). A City in Conflict: Troyes during the French Wars of Religion. Manchester University Press.
- Roelker, Nancy (1968). Queen of Navarre: Jeanne d'Albret 1528–1572. Harvard University Press.
- Roelker, Nancy (1996). One King, One Faith: The Parlement of Paris and the Religious Reformations of the Sixteenth Century. University of California Press. ISBN 0520086260.
- Salmon, J. H. M. (1975). Society in Crisis: France in the Sixteenth Century. Methuen. ISBN 0416730507.
- Spickard, Paul; Cragg, Kevin (2005). A Global History of Christians: How Everyday Believers Experienced Their World. Baker Academic. ISBN 978-0801022494.
- Sutherland, N. M. (1962). "Calvinism and the conspiracy of Amboise". History. 47 (160): 111–138. doi:10.1111/j.1468-229X.1962.tb01083.x.
- Sutherland, Nicola (1973). The Massacre of St Bartholomew and the European Conflict: 1559–1572. Macmillan. ISBN 978-0064966207.
- Sutherland, N.M. (1984). Princes, Politics and Religion 1547–89. Bloomsbury Publishing. ISBN 978-0907628446.
- Sutherland, N. M. (1966). Catherine de Medici and the Ancien Régime. London: Historical Association. OCLC 1018933.
- Sutherland, Nicola (1980). The Huguenot Struggle for Recognition. Yale University Press.
- Thompson, J. W. (1909). The Wars of Religion in France, 1559–1576. Chicago: The University of Chicago Press.
- Tilley, Arthur Augustus (1919). The French wars of religion.
- Tulchin, Allan (2006). "The Michelade in Nimes, 1567". French Historical Studies. 29 1.
- Wood, James (2002). The King's Army: Warfare, Soldiers and Society during the Wars of Religion in France, 1562–1576. Cambridge University Press.

=== Historiography ===
- Diefendorf, Barbara B. (2010). The Reformation and Wars of Religion in France: Oxford Bibliographies Online Research Guide. Oxford U.P. ISBN 978-0199809295.
- Frisch, Andrea Forgetting Differences: Tragedy, Historiography, and the French Wars of Religion (Edinburgh University Press, 2015). x + 176 pp. full text online' online review
- Christian Mühling: Die europäische Debatte über den Religionskrieg (1679–1714). Konfessionelle Memoria und internationale Politik im Zeitalter Ludwigs XIV. (Veröffentlichungen des Instituts für Europäische Geschichte Mainz, 250) Göttingen, Vandenhoeck&Ruprecht, ISBN 978-3525310540, 2018.

=== Primary sources ===
- Potter, David L. (1997). French Wars of Religion, Selected Documents. Palgrave Macmillan. ISBN 978-0312175450.
- Salmon, J. H. M. (1967). The French Wars of Religion. How Important Were Religious Factors?. Lexington, Massachusetts: D. C. Heath and Company. ISBN 9780006725411. Short excerpts from primary and secondary sources.
