= Charles Washington Baird =

American Presbyterian minister and historian

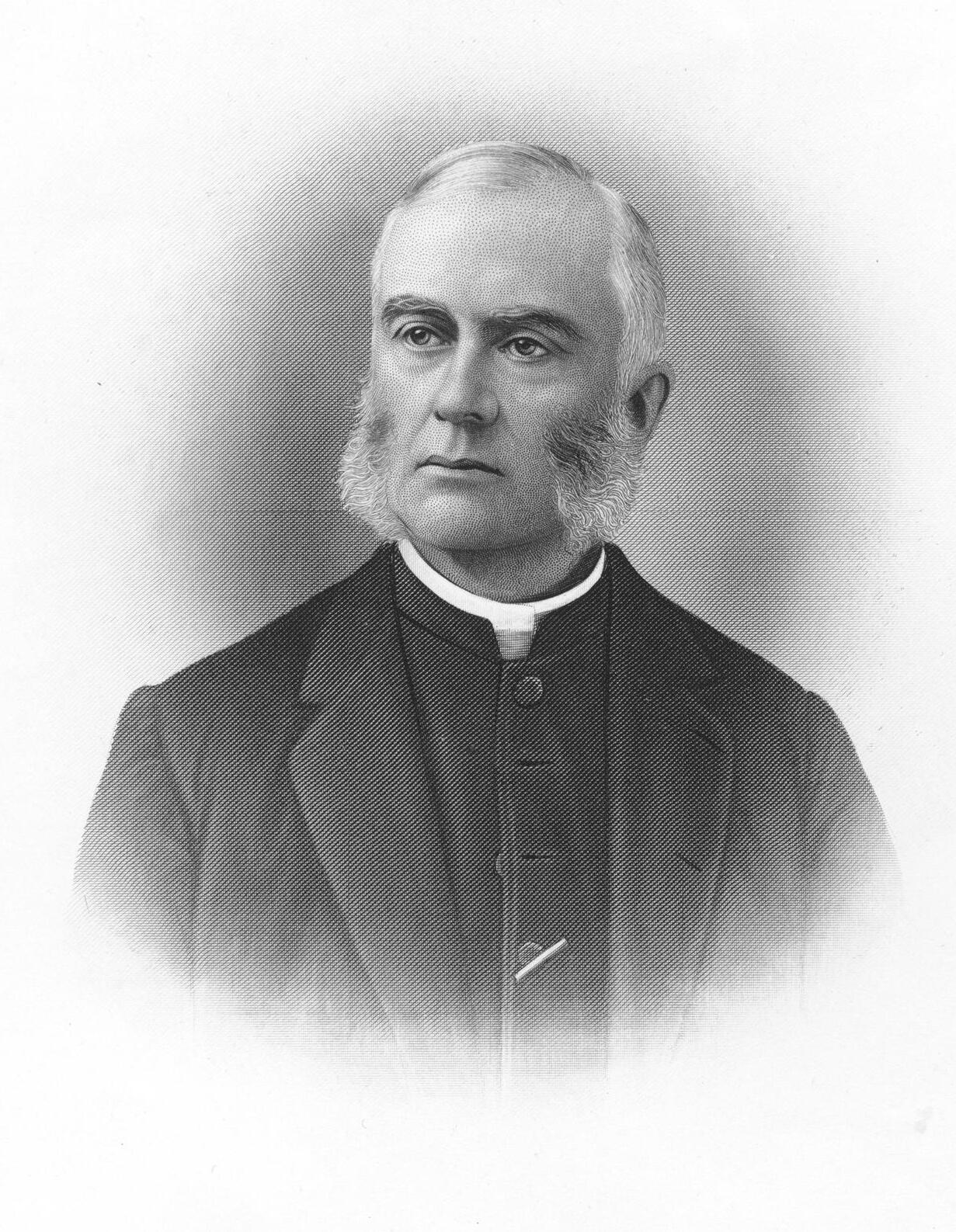
- Born: 28 August 1828
- Died: 10 February 1887 (aged 58)
- Occupation: Writer

Charles Washington Baird (August 28, 1828 – February 10, 1887) was a prominent 19th-century American Presbyterian minister and historian.

== Early life and education ==
Born in Princeton, New Jersey, he was the second son to the evangelical Presbyterian historian Rev. Robert Baird, master of the Latin school in Princeton, New Jersey. He was the older brother of Henry Martyn Baird, a historian of the Huguenots.

He went to Europe in 1835 with his father, when the elder Baird went to represent the Foreign Evangelical Society, whose mission was to support the Protestant cause in the Catholic countries of Europe. He returned to America for his formal education attending college at the University of the City of New York, and seminary at Union Theological Seminary (NYC) in 1852. From 1852 to 1854 he was Chaplain to the American Embassy in Rome, following in his father's footsteps the expressed concern for the Protestant cause on the Continent. In 1854–55, he was agent of the American and Foreign Christian Union in New York.

== American Presbyterian pastor and author ==
He spent the year of 1855, at just 27 years of age, engaged in the work of writing Eutaxia, or the Presbyterian Liturgies: Historical Sketches, which was initially published anonymously (although evidently most reviewers were aware of the book's author). Followed-up in 1857 with A Book of Public Prayer, Compiled from the authorized formularies of the Presbyterian Church, As prepared by the Reformers Calvin, Knox, Bucer and Others.

The publication of Eutaxia, in 1855 has been hailed by some as a "major milestone in American Presbyterianism." Stanley Hall, in his doctoral dissertation on the American Presbyterian "Directory for Worship," cites Baird's Eutaxia as a "groundbreaking study of Presbyterian liturgical history." In 1988, James Smylie edited a whole issue of American Presbyterians, dedicated to writings that had shaped the history of Presbyterianism in America. This collection includes an article on Charles W. Baird by Hughes Oliphant Old.

Charles Baird ministered first as the pastor of the Reformed (Dutch) Church on Bergen Hill, Brooklyn, from 1859 to 1861, and then at the Presbyterian Church in Rye, New York, from 1861 until his death there in 1887.

== Books authored ==
- Eutaxia, or the Presbyterian Liturgies: Historical Sketches. New York: M.W. Dodd, 1855.
- A Book of Public Prayer. New York: Charles Scribner, 1857.
- History of Bedford Church : discourse delivered at the celebration of the two hundredth anniversary of the founding of the Presbyterian Church of Bedford, Westchester Co., New York, March 22d, 1881 / New York : Dodd, Mead, 1882
- History of the Huguenot emigration to America, Vol. 1 and Vol. 2. New York, Dodd, Mead & Company [1885]
