= Henry Martyn Baird =

American historian and educator

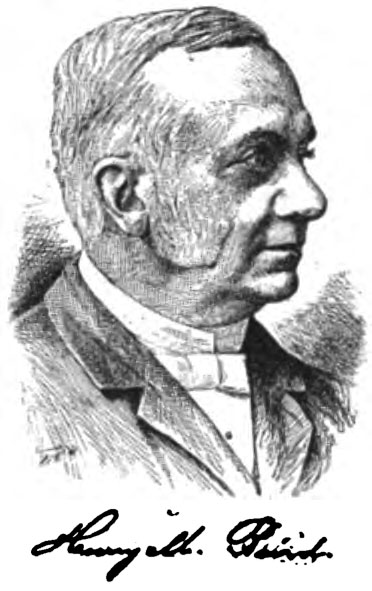
- Born: January 17, 1832; Philadelphia, Pennsylvania
- Died: November 11, 1906 (aged 74); New York City, New York
- Occupations: Historian and educator
- Parent: Robert Baird (1798–1863)

Henry Martyn Baird (January 17, 1832 – November 1906) was an American historian and educator. He is best known as a historian of the Huguenots.

== Life ==
A son of Robert Baird (1798–1863), the Presbyterian preacher and author who worked both in the United States and in Europe for the cause of temperance, Henry Martyn Baird was born in Philadelphia, Pennsylvania, on January 17, 1832. He was the younger brother of Charles Washington Baird, a Presbyterian minister and historian.

The younger Baird spent eight years of his early youth with his father in Paris and Geneva, and in 1850 graduated from New York University. He then lived for two years in Italy and Greece, was a student in the Union Theological Seminary in New York City from 1853 to 1855 and, in 1856, graduated from the Princeton Theological Seminary.

Employed for four years as a tutor at the College of New Jersey (now Princeton University), Henry Martyn Baird was then employed as a professor of Greek language and literature at New York University from 1859 until his death.

== Works ==
Henry Martyn Baird's research and writing regarding the Huguenots appeared in three parts, entitled respectively History of the Rise of the Huguenots of France (2 vols, 1879), The Huguenots and Henry of Navarre (2 vols, 1886), and The Huguenots and the Revocation of the Edict of Nantes (2 vols, 1895), and was described by the 1911 Encyclopædia Britannica as being "characterized by painstaking thoroughness, by a judicial temper, and by scholarship of a high order".

He also published Modern Greece, A Narrative of a Residence and Travels in that Country (1856); a biography of his father, The Life of the Rev. Robert Baird, D.D. (1866); and Theodore Beza, the Counsellor of the French Reformation (1899).

Baird was elected as a member to the American Philosophical Society in 1884. He died in New York City in November 1906.
