= Louis Prévost de Sansac =

French military commander and governor

- Seigneur de Sansac
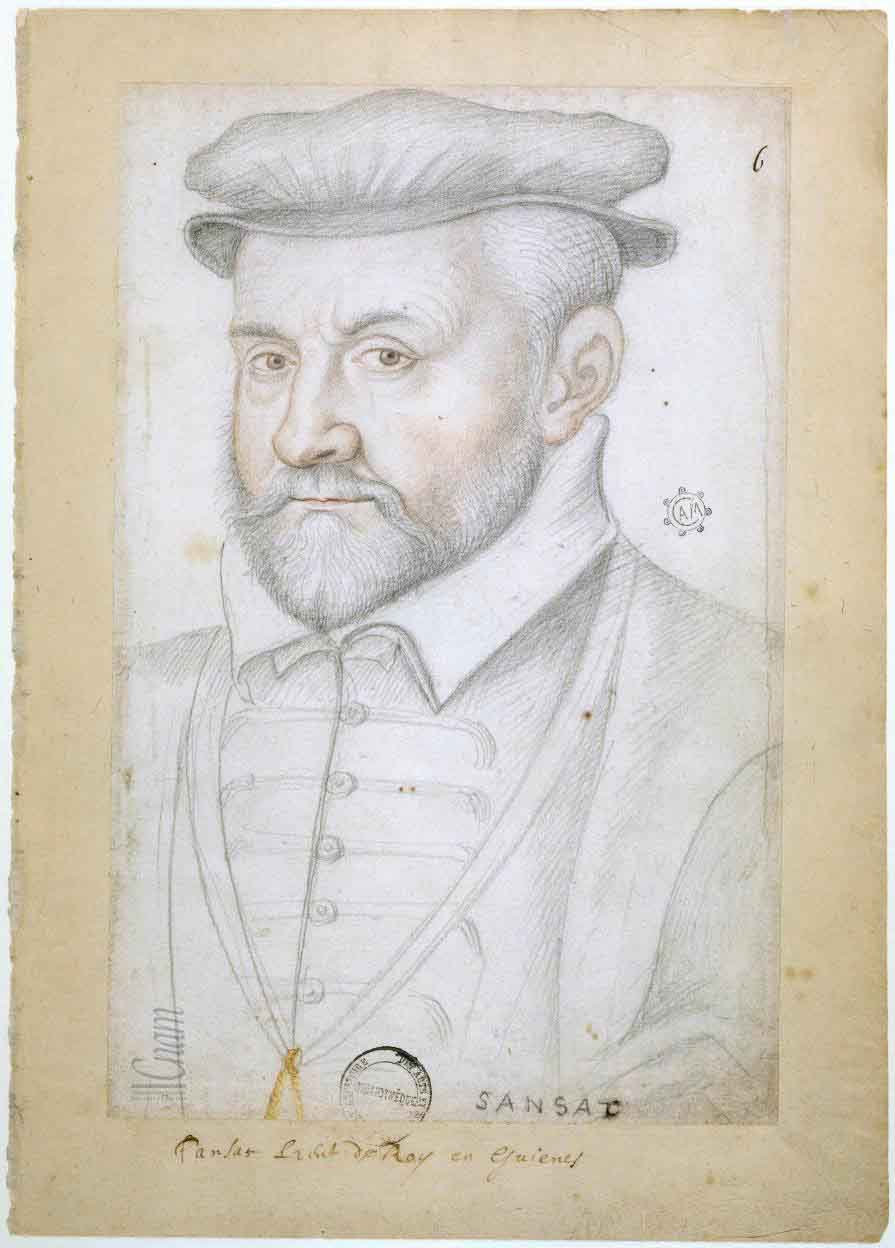
- Louis Prévost de Sansac
- Other titles: Marshal of France
- Born: ~1496; Cognac, Charente
- Died: 1 January 1576 (aged 80); Kingdom of France
- Spouse: Louise of Montbrun

Louis Prėvost de Sansac, seigneur de Sansac (French: [lwi pʁevo də sɑ̃sak]; 1496–1576) was a French military commander and governor. A favourite of François I he fought at the Battle of Pavia and had responsibility for the education of the royal children. He continued to fight for France in the Italian Wars under Henri II and then the French Wars of Religion when they broke out in 1562. He aligned himself politically with the Guise, supporting them in their feud with the House of Montmorency. He led armies through the third civil war, but was not able to achieve any notable success.

== Early life ==
Louis Prévost de Sansac was born in Cognac.

== Reign of François I ==
Sansac proved to be a skilled rider and man of war. As such he was tasked with developing François's skills on the battlefield and during hunts. He joined the king's expedition to Italy, fighting at the Battle of Pavia as a page of Anne de Montmorency. In the wake of the disaster, with the capture of the king, Sansac was also made prisoner, however he was able to escape and worked alongside the regent in the conducting of negotiations with the Spanish the result of which was the Treaty of Madrid. As a reward for his assistance in this matter the king made him tutor to his children upon his return. In this role he provided education on skills such as hunting, riding and combat. In 1529 he had a new residence built near Loches, at which the king and Charles V stayed at various points.

== Reign of Henri II ==
Sansac continued to fight in the Italian wars under Henri, assisting in the holding of the Duchy of Mirandola in 1552.

== Reign of François II ==
In the wake of the Conspiracy of Amboise the Guise administration was faced with a crisis of authority in the country. To counteract a descent into disorder, new super-governorships were created. Alongside these, Sansac held the governorship of Angoumois in the interior for them loyally.

== Reign of Charles IX ==
As royal authority continued to crumble with the outbreak of open civil war, Sansac asked to be relieved of his office in September 1562. With François, Duke of Guise assassinated at the climax of the first war of religion, the perpetrator Jean de Poltrot was quickly apprehended. Under torture he confessed that among the Protestants, Louis, Duke of Montpensier and Sansac were particularly loathed for their persecution of the religion. In the Montmorency-Guise feud that blossomed as a result of recriminations for ultimate responsibility for the assassination, Sansac aligned himself with the Guise, making an oath in 1565 to violently purge France of heresy and avenge the death of Guise up to the fourth generation.

With the Peace of Longjumeau having concluded the second civil war, Sansac was among those royal councillors, aligned with Lorraine in their desire to overturn it.

During the third civil war he led forces for the crown in an attempt to reduce the Huguenot town of La Charité-sur-Loire, his 7000 men were however unable to successfully break the town, and called off their siege in late 1569. With this failure, he sought to siege Vézelay but his efforts here were thwarted by both the garrison and nearby Huguenot forces. He abandoned his attempts on the town on 16 December.

== Sources ==
- Baird, Henry (1880). History of the Rise of the Huguenots: Vol 2 of 2. Hodder & Stoughton.
- Carroll, Stuart (2009). Martyrs and Murderers: The Guise Family and the Making of Europe. Oxford University Press.
- Harding, Robert (1978). Anatomy of a Power Elite: the Provincial Governors in Early Modern France. Yale University Press.
- Romier, Lucien (1913). Les Origines Politiques des Guerres de Religion I: Henri II et la Italie (1551-1555). Librairie Académique Perrin et Cie.
- Sutherland, Nicola (1981). "The Assassination of Francois Duc de Guise February 1563". The Historical Journal. 24 2.
- Sutherland, Nicola (1980). The Huguenot Struggle for Recognition. Yale University Press.
