= Assassination of Admiral Coligny =

1572 event of the French Wars of Religion

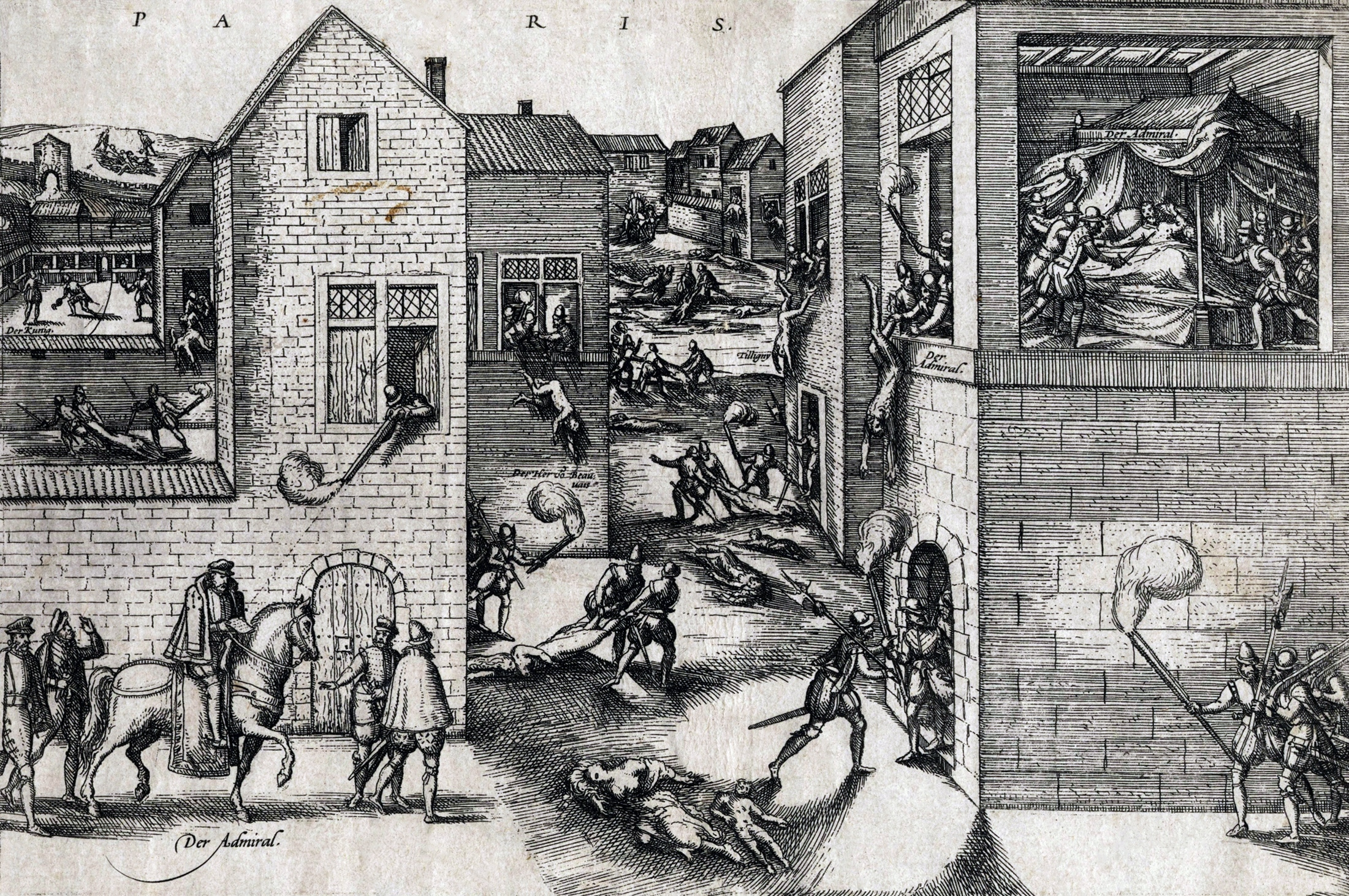
This popular print by Frans Hogenberg shows the attempted assassination of Coligny on 22 August on the left, and his murder on 24 August on the right

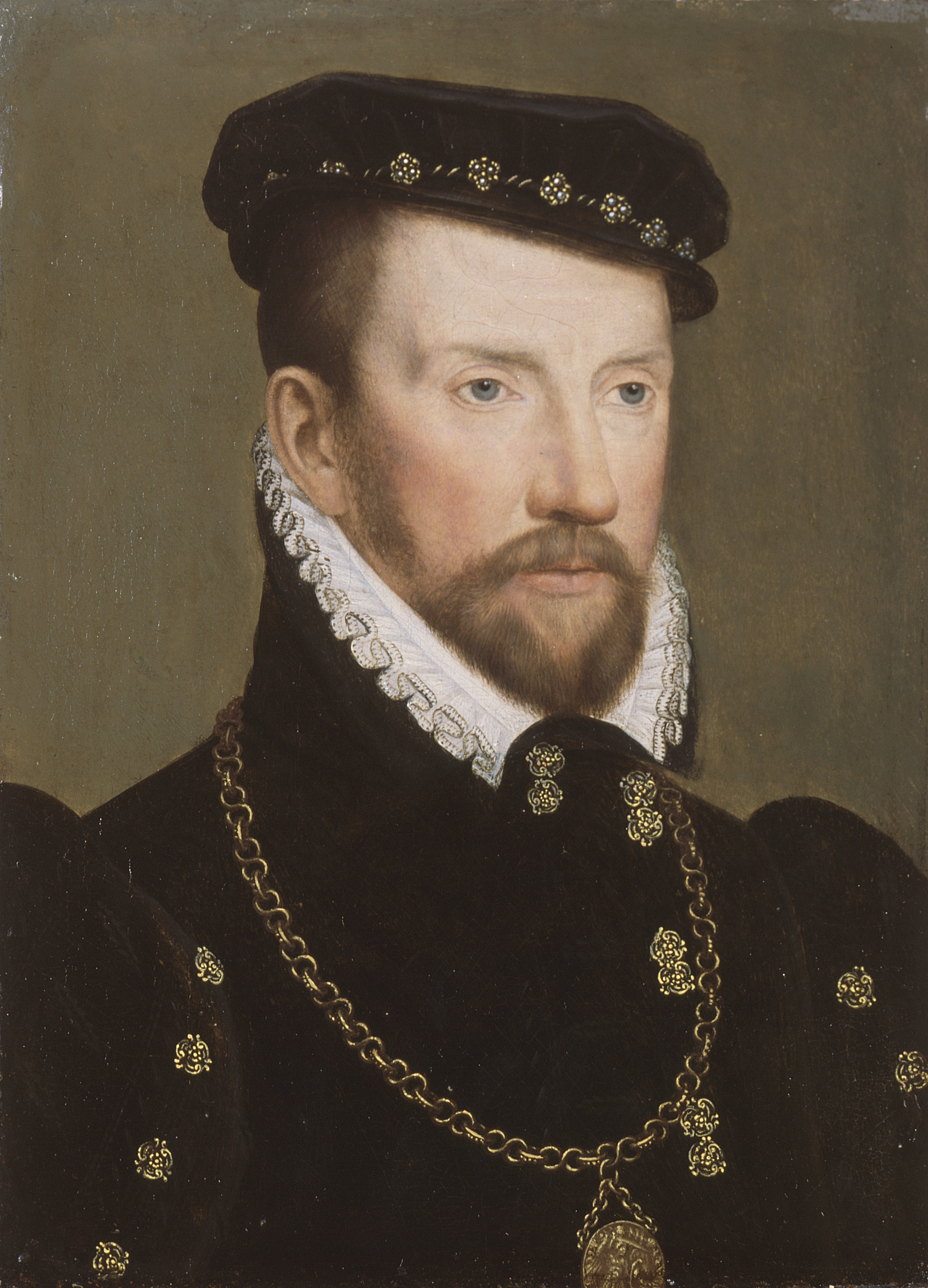
Admiral Gaspard de Coligny, the leader of the Huguenots

The assassination of Admiral Coligny on 24 August 1572 would prelude one of the critical events of the French Wars of Religion, the Massacre of Saint Bartholomew. The figures responsible for first the attempt on his life on 22 August and then his execution on 24 August have long been debated by historians. Coligny's feud with Henry I, Duke of Guise throughout the 1560s and his desire to bring France into conflict with Spain are often cited as key factors. The attempt on his life took place in the wake of the marriage between Navarre and Margaret of Valois a high-profile affair intended as a component of the Peace of Saint-Germain-en-Laye by Catherine de'Medici and her son Charles IX.

== Prelude ==
=== Peace ===
Coligny little trusted the promises of safety from the crown for the prospect of returning to court, and based himself out of La Rochelle from late 1570 into 1571. In 1571 he married Jacqueline de Montbel d'Entremont giving him territorial interest in Savoyard lands. Both the duke of Savoy and the king of Spain were convinced he was plotting against them. Enthusiasm for the planned marriage between Navarre and Margaret of Valois designed as a method to seal the Peace of Saint-Germain was mixed among the Huguenot leadership. Albret was ambiguous on the prospect, while Coligny was opposed, fearing it could withdraw Navarre from the Bourbon-Châtillon orbit with his abjuration. After long resisting coming to the French court Albret arrived in March 1572, and the marriage contract was signed on 11 March. As the wedding drew closer, many Huguenot nobles arrived at the capital for the celebrations. Not easily able to miss such an important event in cementing the peace as well as such an elite marriage. The Guise and their associated clientele took up residence in the Hôtel de Guise.

In September 1571 Coligny arrived at court, being held at Blois, received a generous pension from the king, totalling 150,000 livres and was readmitted onto the king's council. Between this re-admission and August 1572, Coligny would however only be present at court for 5 weeks, and his influence would be highly limited, despite the fears of the militant Catholics that he was driving the king's policy. During his stay at court, the Guise took leave of the king. In June 1572 Coligny again presented himself at court, accompanied by 300 cavaliers.

=== Feud ===
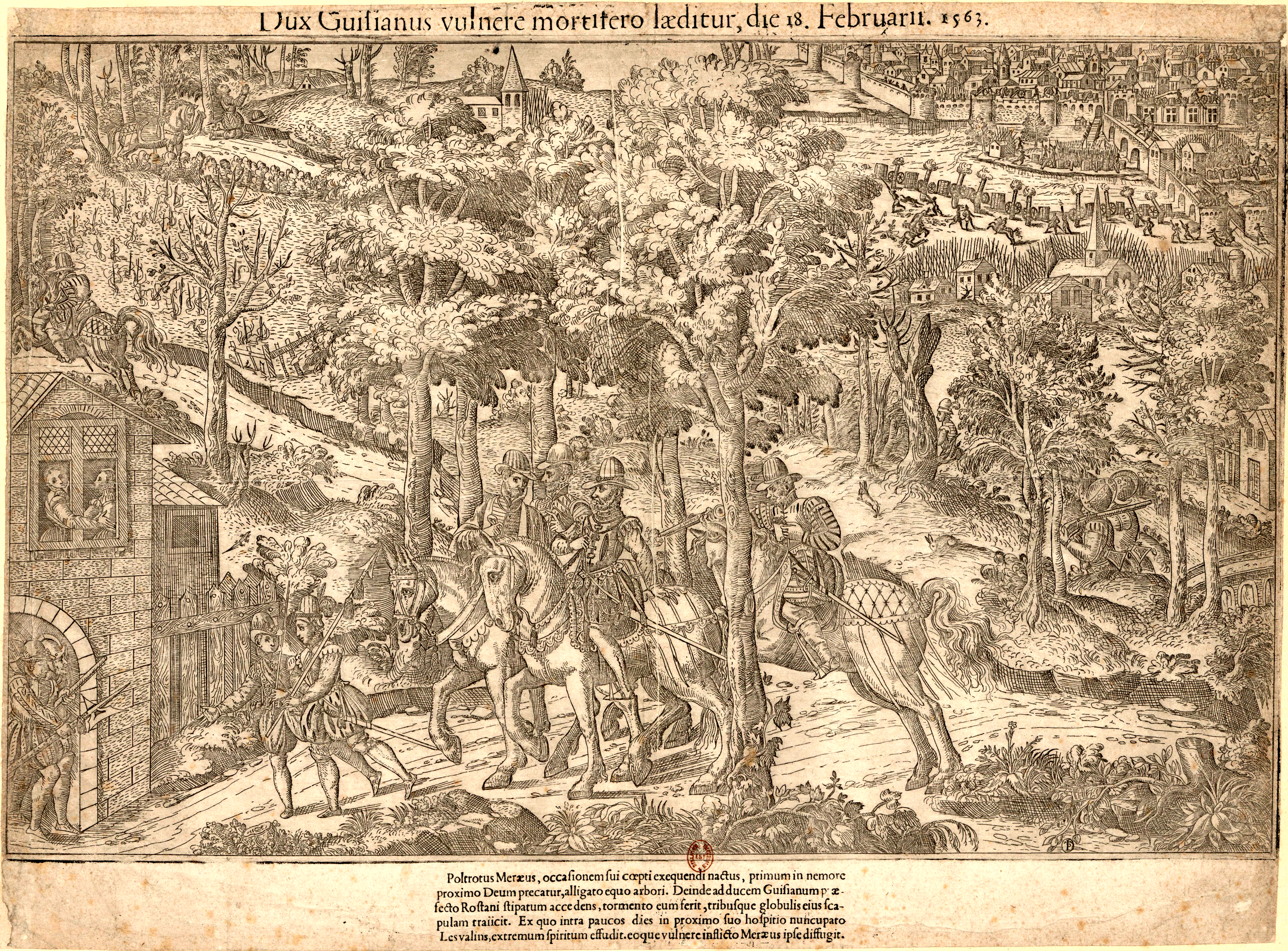
Assassination of François, Duke of Guise on 18 February 1563

At the climax of the siege of Orléans in 1563, the Duke of Guise had been assassinated by the Protestant assassin Poltrot de Méré. Under torture Poltrot would implicate Coligny in the assassination, though his story would change with each telling, and several times he would deny Coligny's involvement. Coligny who was fighting in Normandy, denounced these accusations, demanding a right to cross examine Poltrot in Parlement to clear his name. He would however be hurriedly executed to pre-empt the amnesty clause of the Edict of Amboise.

Poltrot’s testimony would be a lightning rod for Guise anger. Meanwhile Condé and Montmorency rallied to Coligny's defence at council. The Guise family launched a private suite on 26 April 1563. To ensure an appropriately partisan justice was selected to handle their suit they made a show of force at the Parlement session when the decision was being made, with a hundred armed men, succeeding in getting a partisan candidate. The king would however evoke the case to the royal council, removing the Parlement from having jurisdiction. This done he would then arrange for the judgement to be suspended until he reached his majority. Attempting to prove not only Guise had the power to make shows of force, Coligny entered Paris with a large host of armed supporters in November. Catherine summoned both to the Louvre on 6 December in a desperate bid to get them to both calm down. This would be in vain, and the two sides would engage in various petty acts of violence over the coming weeks, culminating in the murder of a guard member. On 5 January the king tried to take more definitive action to crush the feud, suspending judgement for a further three years.

Frustrated at the failure of their strategy, the Guise family altered their approach, seeking to build a non confessional base to prosecute their feud, appealing to Condé by highlighting how Montmorency and the Châtillon were upstart houses compared to true princes like them. Condé on side, Lorraine planned an armed entry into Paris over the protestations of the governor Marshal Montmorency who tried to tell them arms were not allowed in the city of Paris. Lorraine and the young Guise entered with a large retinue under arms, clashing with the forces of Montmorency in several street skirmishes in which they came off the worse, with several dead. Humiliated Lorraine and Guise retreated to their residence where they were besieged by taunts even from the Catholic Parisians.

In early 1566 Lorraine travelled to where the court was staying at Moulins to appeal for proceedings against Coligny. Continuing his strategy from the prior year he characterised himself as a champion of the rights of princes, but the various princes at court were uninterested and voted his proposals down. This allowed Charles to compel Lorraine and Coligny to exchange the kiss of peace. The young Guise would however refuse to appear at Moulins, and further refuse to sign anything that implied Coligny's innoncence. Guise had challenged both Coligny, and Marshal Montmorency to duels, however they felt confident in ignoring his challenges. The king followed the kiss of peace staging by publishing an edict on 29 January 1566; in which Coligny's innocence was declared.

In November 1571 it was reported the Guise faction were gathering funds and followers in Champagne. The Huguenot nobility rallied round Coligny who was at Châtillon, offering their support if conflict broke out again.

In January 1572 the Guise family petitioned for the withdrawal of the arrêt issued at Moulins, concerning their feud with Coligny. On 14 January Guise, Aumale and Mayenne entered Paris with a strong escort of 500 men in another show of force. In another display of bluster he requested the king's permission to fight Coligny in single combat. In March Charles again cleared Coligny of involvement in the assassination of the Duke of Guise. Satisfied that he had protected his honour, the younger Guise was persuaded by the king in May to abide by the terms of the Moulins agreement that he had previously avoided. This undertaking delighted the king.

=== Dutch revolt ===
The Dutch revolt was continuing to intersect closely with French politics. William of Orange had fought with Coligny during the Siege of Poitiers (1569) and while he had left afterwards to organise further in the Spanish Netherlands his brother Louis of Nassau was among those who stayed behind, operating out of La Rochelle under Coligny's protection to attack Spanish shipping. Nassau had also fought with Coligny during the third civil war. When the Spanish ambassador, Alava complained of this harbouring to Charles, the king retorted that 'his master should not look to give laws to France.' In July 1571 Charles attended a meeting at Fontainebleau with Louis of Nassau to discuss the prospects of intervention in the Netherlands, with potential for a partition. Téligny also returned to court around this time, one of the first Huguenot nobles to do so, working with Nassau in the hopes of persuading Charles.

It was for reasons of pursuing this policy that Coligny made his return to court in August 1571, hoping to bring the king firmly on board with war with Spain. Catherine was firmly opposed to this course of action. On 1 April 1572, the Sea Beggars seized Brill, and several days later Orange issued a declaration of war on Spain on 14 April. Nassau looked to Charles to join with a declaration of war by France, but neither he nor any member of his council outside of Coligny was willing to join in this course.

In late May Nassau and some Huguenot allies decided to act regardless, crossing the border and capturing the towns of Valenciennes and Mons. This further spurred Coligny to call for war with Spain, but Charles responded by prohibiting his subjects from crossing the border in support of Nassau on 7 June. Charles oversaw three of his councillors, Tavannes, Nevers and Jean de Morvillier composing memoranda against open war with Spain. In mid July several hundred more Huguenots would in defiance of this ban cross the border under the leadership of Genlis who had previously been with Nassau during the capture of Mons. The Spanish would crush this force, destroying Genlis’ army at Saint-Ghislain near Mons and taking 200 men including Genlis prisoner. Both Coligny and Charles were implicated as having provided covert levels of support. However Charles vigorously denied this and on 21 July affirmed his friendship with Spain. Coligny fretted about the fate of the prisoners in Alva's hands, trying to arrange a ransom via the agent Mondoucet, but this came to nought. Coligny was in continued correspondence with Orange and reassured him that soon he would be coming to their aid with 12,000 foot and 3,000 horse. To this end after another stay in Châtillon he again visited Paris to push his war plan, highlighting the strategic advantages of weakening Spain in this theatre. There are reports that Coligny transmitted a threat to the Spanish ambassador via Jérôme de Gondi implying he would kill him if he did not ensure the prisoners were treated well in the Netherlands.

Coligny began recruiting in August for an expedition, with the support of François de Montmorency. Catherine returned from a meeting at Châlons with her daughter, and obliged the council to re-open the debate on intervention, hoping to shut down Charles' ambiguous policy. On 9 and 10 August the court was unanimous in rejecting this proposal. In spite of this Alba complained that yet again there were troops assembling near Mons. Dark threats were emanating from some leading Huguenots during this time that they would savage the comte de Retz for his alleged promise to several ambassadors that he would ensure an anti-war resolution from the council. Retz had allegedly received 25,000 écus to stop the entreprise.

=== Wedding ===
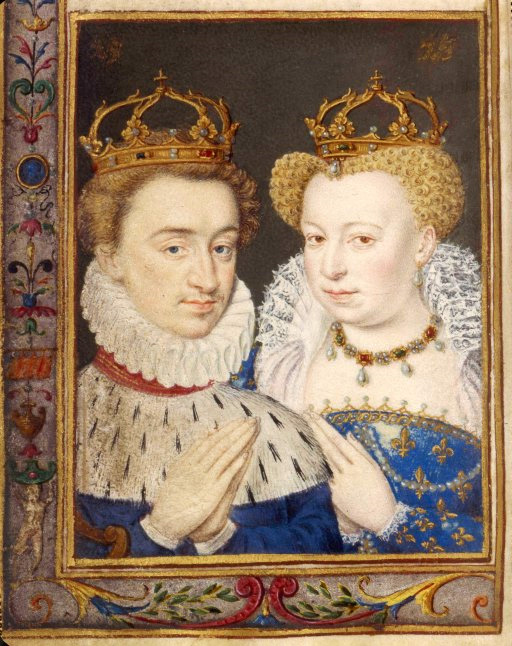
Henry of Navarre and Margaret of Valois

Guise and his retinues arrived in the city for the wedding in early August, to a rapturous welcome from the militant parts of the population. They based themselves out of the Hôtel de Guise and the cloisters of Saint-Germain and other places of the clergy in the city.

On 17 August the engagement took place between the couple. The next day, 18 August the wedding was celebrated at the Notre-Dame without the long-awaited Papal dispensation. A cortege of the couple, the princes of the blood, the marshals and grandes of France followed them down the aisle. In place of the Pope's blessing, Cardinal Bourbon was coerced into giving his assent to the match. For attendance of Mass, Anjou filled in for the place of Navarre. The Catholics were dressed in their most exuberant finery, with Anjou wearing a pale yellow satin suit with silver embroidery and pearls. This conspicuously marked out the Huguenot nobles, all clothed in dour black for the celebration.

Whilst leaving Notre-Dame, Coligny happened to notice the flags that had been lost on the field of Moncontour and Jarnac hanging from the heights. Upset at this, de Thou who was present records that he proposed they be taken down and placed somewhere more respectful, and confided in Damville who was with him that they would bring home better ones from Flanders. On the same day he wrote to his wife, confiding in her his reasons for staying in the capital. He told her that while he yearned to be with her once more, he had important business to address first related to the edict and Spain. The wedding now concluded, it would be followed by a packed calendar of festivities over the next four days, with tournaments, banquets, balls and ballets. On 20 August a masquerade was held at the Hôtel du Bourbon, with the area turned into a paradise of nymphs, that Condé and Navarre with several Catholics attempted to enter, dressed as knights, but the gates were defended by the king and his brothers, who bested the attackers and locked them in hell. A storm came in during the night, and swept away much of the equipment that had been used for the masquerade. On 21 August a pantomime was mixed with a tournament. Condé and Navarre now dressed as 'Turks' in large green turbans were bested in combat by the king and his brothers who were bare chested, dressed as 'Amazons' wielding bows.

While these festivities were under way, the elderly Coligny walked about in an apparently depressed mood. He desired the king to address various matters for him, relating to issues in the Netherlands, and the Edict of Saint-Germain. Charles declined to discuss these matters, saying that he wanted to have some time for enjoyment, and that he would address the admiral's concerns to his satisfaction in a few days time. The atmosphere was uneasy in Paris and several nobles of the admiral's party, Blosset and Langoiran, departed from the city hastily on 21 August, desiring more friendly surrounds. The Duke of Montmorency, governor of Paris had also departed the city, retiring to Chantilly with an 'illness,' though Estèbe contended that this was simply a pretext to get away from a potentially explosive situation.

At last the festivities came to the end in the evening of 21 August.

== Assassination attempt of 22 August ==
=== Planning the attack ===
After the wedding of Navarre and Margaret, Coligny tarried in the capital. He had business to discuss with the king about violations of the Edict of Saint-Germain, and did not wish to depart until he had acquired assurances as to their resolutions. Previously Francois de Villars, sieur de Chailly had introduced Maurevert under a false name to the servants of a house belonging to a Guise servant on the rue des fosses Saint-Germain. Maurevert spent hours observing Coligny over the coming days, watching his comings and goings to build up an idea of his route. The Admiral passed the point several times a day, due to the house's location between the Louvre and Coligny's lodgings, making it an opportune firing location.

=== Coligny's morning ===
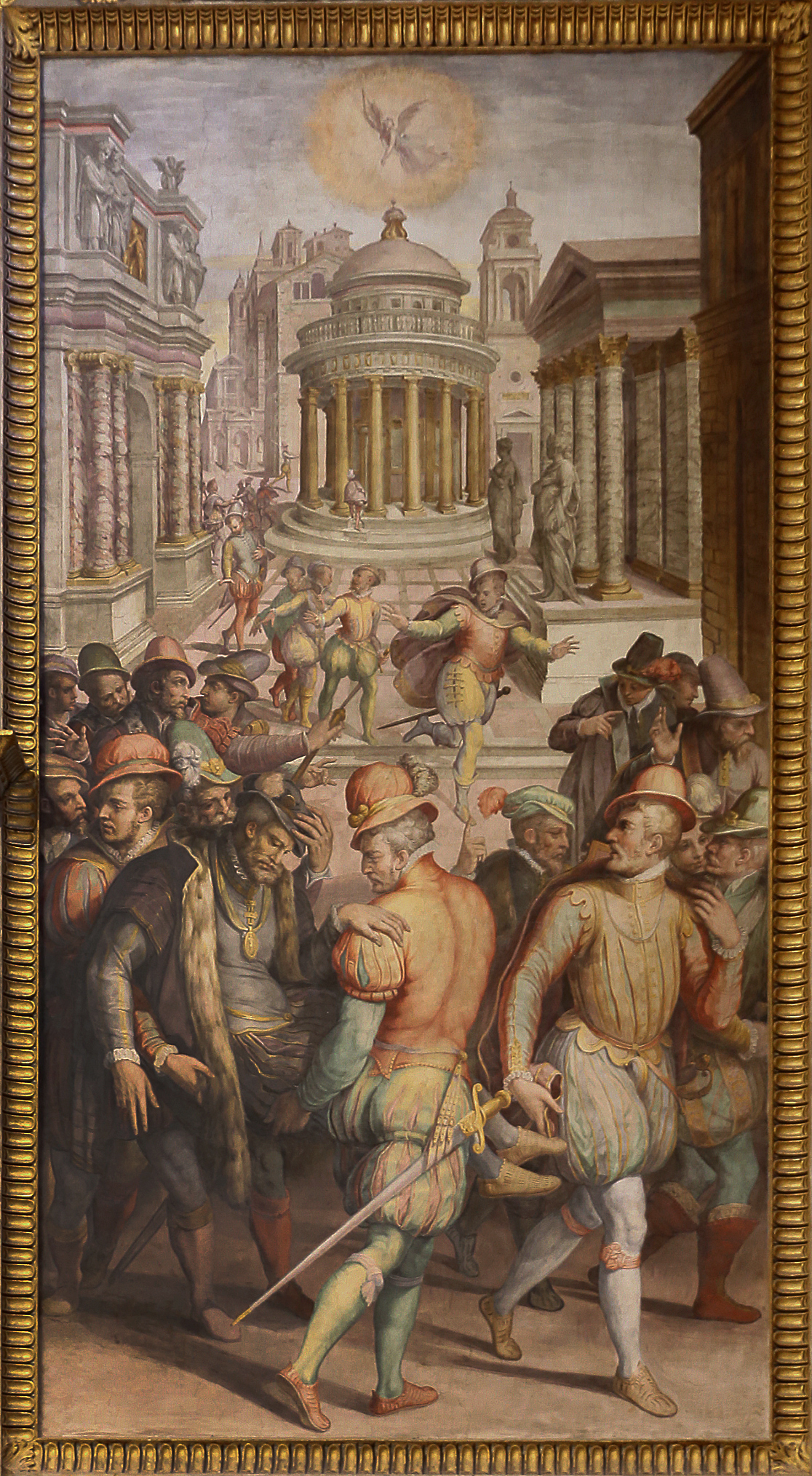
Coligny carried off the street by his supporters in the wake of the attack

Having been at a meeting with the council in the Louvre, presided over by Anjou in the king's absence, Coligny was on his way home around 11am to the rue de Béthisy, a little later than his usual time as the king had wanted him to observe a game of tennis. Hostile onlookers were kept back by a dozen body guards. As he travelled he lost himself reading various papers when suddenly as he entered the rue des Poulies he was shot from an upper story barred window, by a man hiding behind a curtain. The musket ball tore through a finger on his right hand and went into his left arm. Impassive in the face of this injury, Coligny pointed at where the assailant had shot him from saying to those with him "see how good people are treated in France! The shot came from that window. There is smoke!."

He had been accompanied on his journey home by Guerchy and Pruneaux among other familiars and two of them, Saint-Auban and Séré raced towards the building, forcing the door. Yet the sieur de Maurevert, who likely fired the shot managed to escape. Only his hot musket was found, still in place at the window. A second door was found at the back of the building, through which Maurevert had escaped on a prepared horse. At Saint-Antoine gate he switched horses. Saint-Auban and Séré followed closely, capturing an accomplice of his at Charenton. As Maurevert fled further towards the château de Chailly the two gentleman had to give up the chase as the drawbridge was raised and arquebuses pointed from the windows. While he was able to evade capture by Coligny's men, his identity is largely a consensus of historians.

=== Reactions ===
Coligny quickly despatched two of his close associates, Piles and Monneins, to inform the king of what happened. The king was playing a match of tennis with the Duke of Guise when the news was brought to him. The king paled, shouted in frustration, then threw down his racket, and stormed off enraged to his quarters accompanied by guards and Guise. Recovering from his outburst the king quickly responded to the situation. He charged the leading Parlementaire de Thou to investigate responsibility for the crime. He then issued notices to the provincial governors informing them of the attack and outlining his intention to have the perpetrator punished in exemplary fashion.

While Catherine also paled, she remained impassive, sequestering herself with Anjou to discuss matters further.

The city of Paris reacted with agitation to the news of the attempted assassination with merchants closing their shops. News reached the Hôtel de Ville at 11am and the mayor and prêvot took measures to prevent disturbances, by guarding the gates of the city and mustering archers and arquebusiers. In an attempt to prevent further panic, they ordered that the stores be re-opened. They also pushed for the disarming of the bourgeois.

Meanwhile, at Coligny's house the Huguenot nobility had assembled in defence of their leader. Present were Navarre, Condé, Téligny and other leaders. Infuriated the rasher members of the party spoke of going to the Louvre and cutting down Guise in front of the king. Some of Coligny's supporters proposed killing various other figures whom they held responsible. Some proposed intimidating displays outside the hôtel de Lorraine. A little later the moderate Catholics Damville and Villars arrived at Coligny's residence. The wounded admiral stated that he wished them to bring the king to his bedside since he was in no condition to visit the Louvre.

=== Visit of Charles ===
Charles IX as an adult, by François Clouet

In the early afternoon a large party including Charles, Catherine, Montpensier and all the leading members of the council, came to visit Coligny at his residence. Coligny fatalistically defended his fellow Huguenots from the charge of rebellion and urged Charles to take the initiative in Flanders. He went on to complain that the king was disservised by his advisers, who had violated his edicts and sold his secrets to Spain. The king excused this as a result of Coligny being 'overheated' and promised that he would serve justice for the crime committed against the admiral. He and Catherine both asked to see the copper bullet that had been pulled from his hand and it was provided to them. Charles proposed moving Coligny to the Louvre to protect him from the population of Paris, but his medical advisers did not think this prudent.

=== Protestant council ===
After the king had left, some of his allies such as the Vidame de Chartres urged Coligny to leave the capital for safer territory. Téligny convinced the admiral to stay in Paris, vouching for the king's good will and the opportunity for revenge. It would have also been apparent to Coligny that to immediately depart would have been an insult to the king, and possibly even taken as a declaration of war. It was eventually agreed that Navarre and Condé would go to the Louvre and demand justice again for the attempted assassination. The king again promised that the perpetrators would be brought to justice. In an armed demonstration, a large number of Huguenot nobles made a menacing demonstration as they went past the residence of Anne d'Este and Aumale. They also approached Catherine in the Tuileries gardens, offering threats if justice was not delivered. This aggressive behavior upset Charles as it appeared to imply a violation of his monopoly on justice.

On the evening of 22 August the Protestant Pardaillan, in the queen's presence during dinner, opined that the Huguenots would take justice into their own hands if it were not done for them. That night, in spite of the tense atmosphere amongst both factions, Paris was quiet.

== Culpability ==
=== Catherine ===
Catherine is considered by many scholars, as being jealous of Coligny's influence and rapport with the young king. However, this analysis is largely found in older histories, such as that of Thompson and Maréjole. Under this analysis, in an attempt to regain her supreme place in the government and not be sidelined, coupled with terror of Spain, Catherine organised the attack on Coligny. Shimizu highlights that Catherine would have had little place in a war council, and thus Coligny's Spanish designs impeded her political interests as he would surely dominate the court in such an eventuality.

Estèbe places the blame for the attack on Condé at the feet of Catherine, Anjou, and Guise, with the latter acting as the 'fall guy' taking advantage of his feud with the Admiral for their royal ends. Her plot uncovered, she is frightened that the Guise will not take the fall alone and will mention her and Anjou's complicity.

This notion has been challenged in more recent scholarship that argues it was not in Catherine's interests at that moment. Since the peace of Saint-Germain she had pursued a reconciliation of the king's subjects, to unify them under the king's authority once more. After the council so clearly rejected Coligny's policy on 9 August the idea the notion that she would be fearful of Coligny's influence on the state is illogical. Moreover, the idea that Coligny was ascendant and dominant in council has been thoroughly challenged in more recent works, such as Sutherland.

=== Charles ===
For much the same reason as with Catherine, Charles policy of seeking internal harmony in the post 1570 order makes it hard to imagine his being responsible for the assassination attempt. To reinforce his authority over the kingdom internal peace was a fundamental requisite, and the attempt on Coligny was only liable to undermine that and push France towards civil war.

=== Guise ===
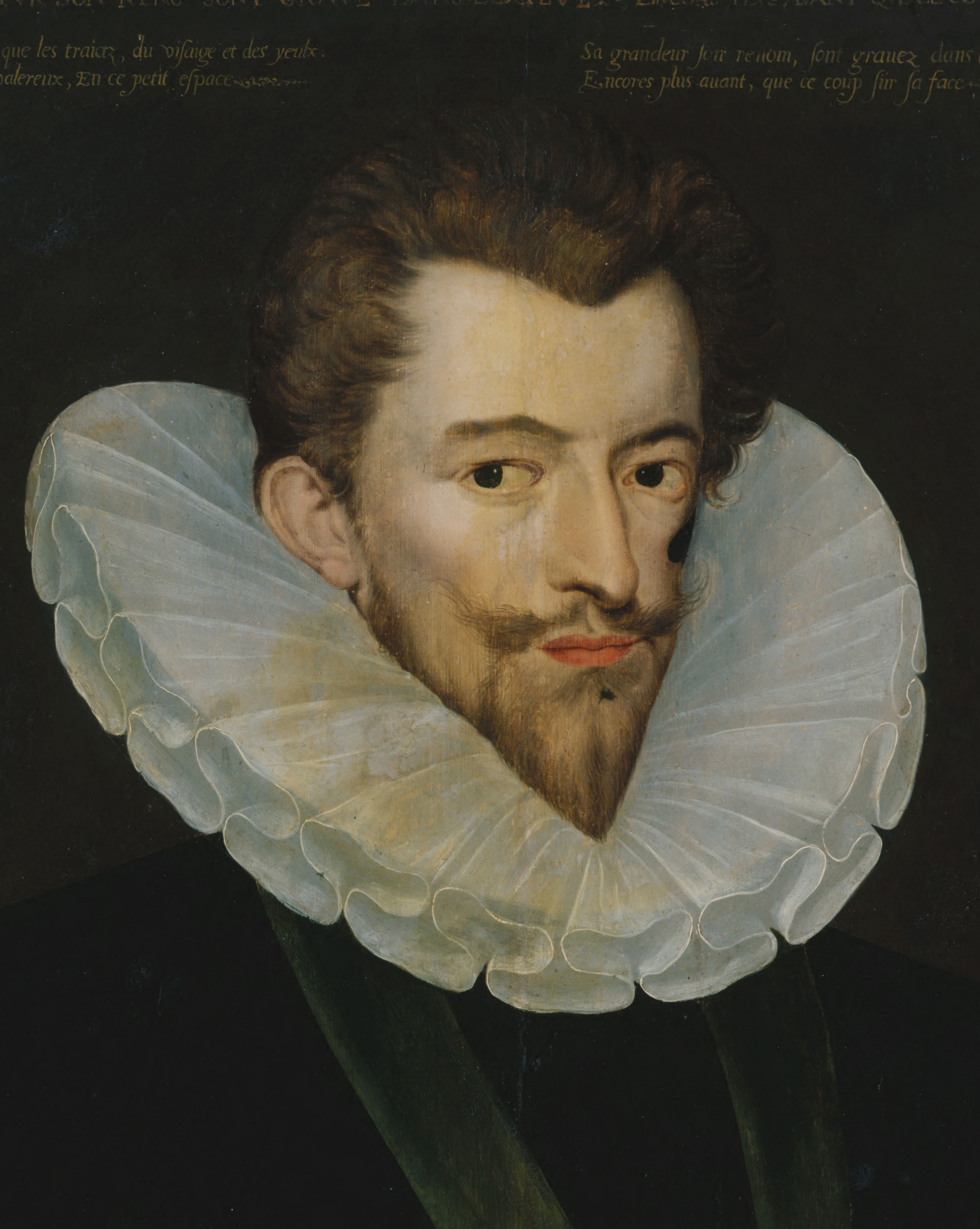
Henri, Duke of Guise

Charles would write a letter to the English ambassador on 22 August, opining that he would 'make sure his subjects were not drawn into this private quarrel.' By which he referred to the Guise as the perpetrators of the attack on Coligny.

Immediate circumstantial evidence strongly implicated the Guise. The house from which the shot was fired was rented by the canon de Villemur formerly a preceptor of the duke of Guise. Villemur was further the household official of one of Guise's followers, Cardinal Pellevè who was in Rome with Lorraine. Further, witnesses reported the sieur de Chailly, the maître de hôtel of Charles IX and superintendent of the duke of Guise, had set Maurevert up with the house. Guise had a long running vendetta with Coligny for which he desired satisfaction.

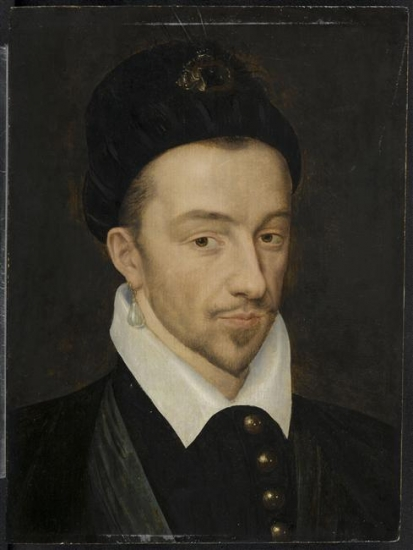
Henri, Duke of Anjou, as King Henri III (1581)

It has been argued the multiplicity of all these clientage ties is a sign the Guise were likely innocent and the attack was designed to enrage the Huguenots against them, shattering the peace. Jouanna highlights this argument works both ways and the crime being 'signed' just as easily points to the vendetta as it does to it being a framing. Ambassador Michel advances the argument that the problem with the Guise theory is that it would have been considered a breach of honour to make this audacious move in the king's presence. The Guise return to favour was fragile and recent, to risk shattering it so soon would be foolish. However, if the Guise carried out the assassination on the orders of a member of the royal family, they would circumvent this risk in carrying out the hit.

Carroll makes an argument on grounds of poor timing. The large part of the Guise clan was in Italy, if the Guise were going to strike at Coligny they would want their full strength present to face the inevitable judicial and political backlash

=== Anjou ===
Anjou had a history of being at the centre of Catholic extremist plots, going back to his 1562 involvement in a plan to run away from court in opposition to Charles. He had a history of being close with Lorraine who had attached himself to the ultra party since 1563. Holt accuses him of involvement in the plan and Sutherland places him on the extreme wing of the council with de Retz as plausible instigators. Carroll sees his influence being key if it was Guise who made the move against Coligny, arguing Guise would not have respected assurances from his 'social inferiors' on the council like de Retz and needed a prince like Anjou to give him the greenlight. He further highlights Anjou's reputation as an intriguer.

=== Maurevert ===
The notion of Maurevert acting independently is not a new one. de Bellièvre espoused it shortly after the massacre in an attempt to exonerate the king in front of the diet of Bâle. He argued that with Coligny having sworn vengeance against Maurevert for his assassination of Mouy in 1569, Maurevert had much to lose by Coligny gaining prominence on the king's council and did not need the Guise to drive him to attempt murder. Diefendorf acknowledges this possibility among the plausible scenarios. Yet the logistics of the operation make an isolated attack hard to conceive of, even for a man of relative means like Maurevert.

Maurevert was raised as a page in the household of François de Guise and was likely still in Guise's service in 1561. He had been an officer in a Protestant cavalry company in the third civil war. When his commander Mouy went to take care of 'his necessities' he followed him and shot him in the back. He then rode off with the corpse to the Catholic camp. Anjou rewarded him for this with 2,000 crowns and inducted him into the Order of Saint Michel.

In 1571 he signed over all his goods to his half brother de Foissy cutting off all his lawful heirs. Foissy was one of the Guise family’s most important servants in the region of Brie in which Maurevert lived. A wanted man he relied on the Guise for protection from Coligny and Mouy's family.

A receipt from 1573 shows Guise offering to pay Maurevert a sum of 2,000 livres annually until such time he received an equivalent royal pension. In 1581 a record shows that Maurevert received 2,000 livres on 22 August 1575, the anniversary of the assassination attempt. By this time Maurevert was also in receipt of a royal pension of 650 livres. The fact Anjou upon becoming king paid him a royal pension puts his nickname of 'kings killer' in a new light.

The consequence of Maurevert’s murder of Coligny's lieutenant Mouy finally caught up with him in 1583, when Mouy's son fatally wounded him.

=== Other theories ===
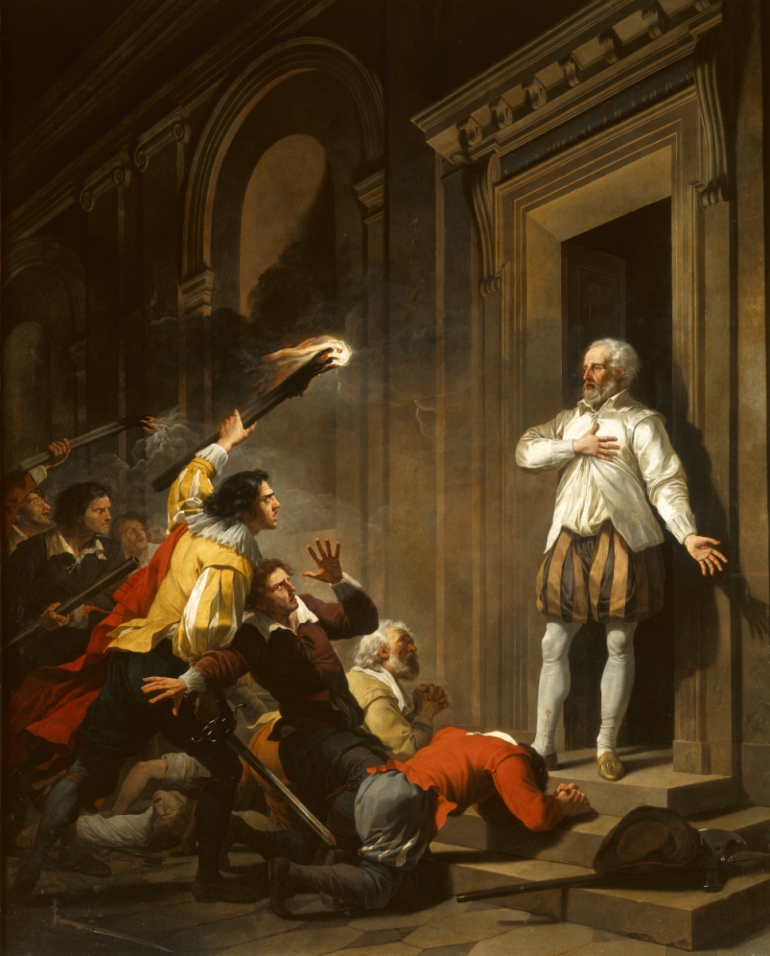
Admiral Coligny Confronts His Assassins by Joseph-Benoît Suvée, 1787

==== Parlement ====
Roelker highlights that no traditional accounts represent the Parlement as having any involvement in either the attempt or his later execution. Bourgeon however challenges this, arguing de Thou and Segieur, two leading figures in the Parlement conspired together both to foment the violence and cover up any complicity in it by staging a strike among the Parlementaires so that they would not be sitting on any of the days that their plan was coming to fruition. Bourgeon links the Parlement of 1572 with later rebellious Parlements, characterising it as a Fronde Parlement. Roelker is critical of his arguments, suggesting the combative relationship between Charles IX and the Parlement was simply a part of the way the relationship functioned as a bargaining of powers. Moreover, even in their private correspondence most Parlementaires demonstrate a devotion to the monarchy. Bourgeon’s theories are not widely held among historians.

==== Spain and the Papacy ====
The duke of Guise would later argue for the responsibility of Alba in this attack.

Bourgeon has also argued that Spain and the Papacy were behind the plot to kill Coligny, with Alba the prime figure in bringing the plot to fruition. It was to be the first shot in a plan to realign French foreign policy away from interference in the Netherlands. The motivation for this has been various ascribed. Some attribute Spain's desire to strike at Coligny as a method to stop his plans against the Spanish Netherlands. Jounna queries how much of a risk war with Spain actually was, characterising the courts of both powers as being opposed to open war and keen to maintain the 'mask of good relations' while both sides knew the other knew they were insincere. Coligny threatened this policy of 'masking' through his desire to openly declare war on Spain. For weeks Coligny had only been held off from attacking into the Netherlands by the needs to preserve internal peace during the marriage, with nothing to stop him now and 4,000 horse and 12,000 foot in the area nothing but his removal could prevent the enterprise.

Despite this desire though, Jouanna concludes that with only forces under Coligny likely to enter the Netherlands, he would be disavowed by Charles as Genlis and Nassau had been, making the need to kill him to kill the war obsolete. When Zuñiga wrote to Philip on 23 August he argued Coligny being alive was of benefit to Spain as it forced Charles to maintain his 'mask' because to declare war would be to give Coligny immense power over the government. Carroll concurs with Zuňiga's read of events, arguing Coligny was a useful force of division in France for Spain.

Alba's recent victories over Genlis and the recapture of Valenciennes had further emboldened him in the knowledge that if Coligny did cross the border independently, he could be beaten.

If the Papacy was involved as Bourgeon implies, the Nuncio Salviati shows little knowledge of it in his correspondence with Rome on 22 August, commenting only 'everything would be disrupted and altered.'

== 23 August ==
=== Investigation ===
On the morning of 23 August, Ambroise Paré the famed surgeon came to dress Coligny's wounds. His assessment was that the wound was unlikely to get worse, and that no amputation would be required. The Protestants around Coligny were still debating how to proceed, the Vidame de Chartres made the call to depart Paris, no longer able to tolerate the hostile atmosphere. The majority however, won over by the king's earnest good faith, decided it was safe to remain. Meanwhile, at court, de Thou and a Protestant named Cavaignes reported their initial findings to the king and his mother. They had interviewed a footman and a servant from the house where the shot was taken. They reported that the sieur de Chailly had entrusted the arquebusier to their care the day before. Chailly was superintendent of affairs for the Duke of Guise. Charles ordered the arrest of Chailly, however the Guise ensured that he was able to leave town. The queen calmed Charles, arguing it was natural for a son to desire to avenge the killing of his father.

The duke of Guise, having previously quarrelled with the king decided to leave Paris before noon, but curiously did not actually leave the city. Carroll speculates this is because he realised doing so would be an admission of guilt. Making a show of heading to the gate he retreated covertly to his residence.

=== Anjou's troops ===
As the morning came to an end two Protestants, Téligny and Cornaton asked to be received by the king. They brought to the king's attention the agitation of the population, and requested an armed guard be provided for Coligny. The king expressed shock that people would be agitating in the streets, as he had demanded the populace be disarmed. At this point Anjou intervened, offering a guard of 50 arquebusiers to be provided for the house. However the men would be chosen for their militant Catholism, with Cosseins as captain, who detested Coligny. Téligny, knowing of Cosseins’ reputation, quietly murmured that 6 archers would be sufficient for the needs, but he accepted the offer regardless as it was impossible to refuse. The king of Navarre volunteered to send some of his Swiss guard for Coligny's residence. The king was pleased Coligny was now well guarded.

=== Coligny's residence ===
On return to Coligny's residence, the Admiral learned of the results of the preliminary inquiry, and it was resolved that the leading Huguenots would go to confront the duke the next day. With Cosseins’ guards now arriving they fell into several disagreements with the Huguenots, first with Navarre entering Coligny's house under arms which violated their plan of action for no arms to be allowed in the house outside of those possessed by the guard. His Swiss soldiers would be confined to the yard. Secondly they clashed with Guerchy who enraged was only narrowly persuaded by Téligny to not stab Cosseins. The Vidame de Chartres made one final attempt to persuade Coligny to abandon the city, highlighting the spread of false rumours about him on the street, the dark conversations happening in the Louvre and his better condition. He suggested to the Admiral that he'd be best able to recover at home in Châtillon.

Other Huguenots, sharing the Vidame's unease, refused to occupy the buildings vacated for them around Coligny, anxiety overriding loyalty to the Admiral, preferring instead to keep to the more secure faubourg Saint-Germain.

Rumours swirled on the street that the Huguenots were planning to butcher the Guise, and that Montmorency was about to fall on the city with a large body of cavalry. Despite being Catholic Montmorency was detested for his politique outlook, having overseen the removal of the Gastines cross in the year prior.

=== First council ===
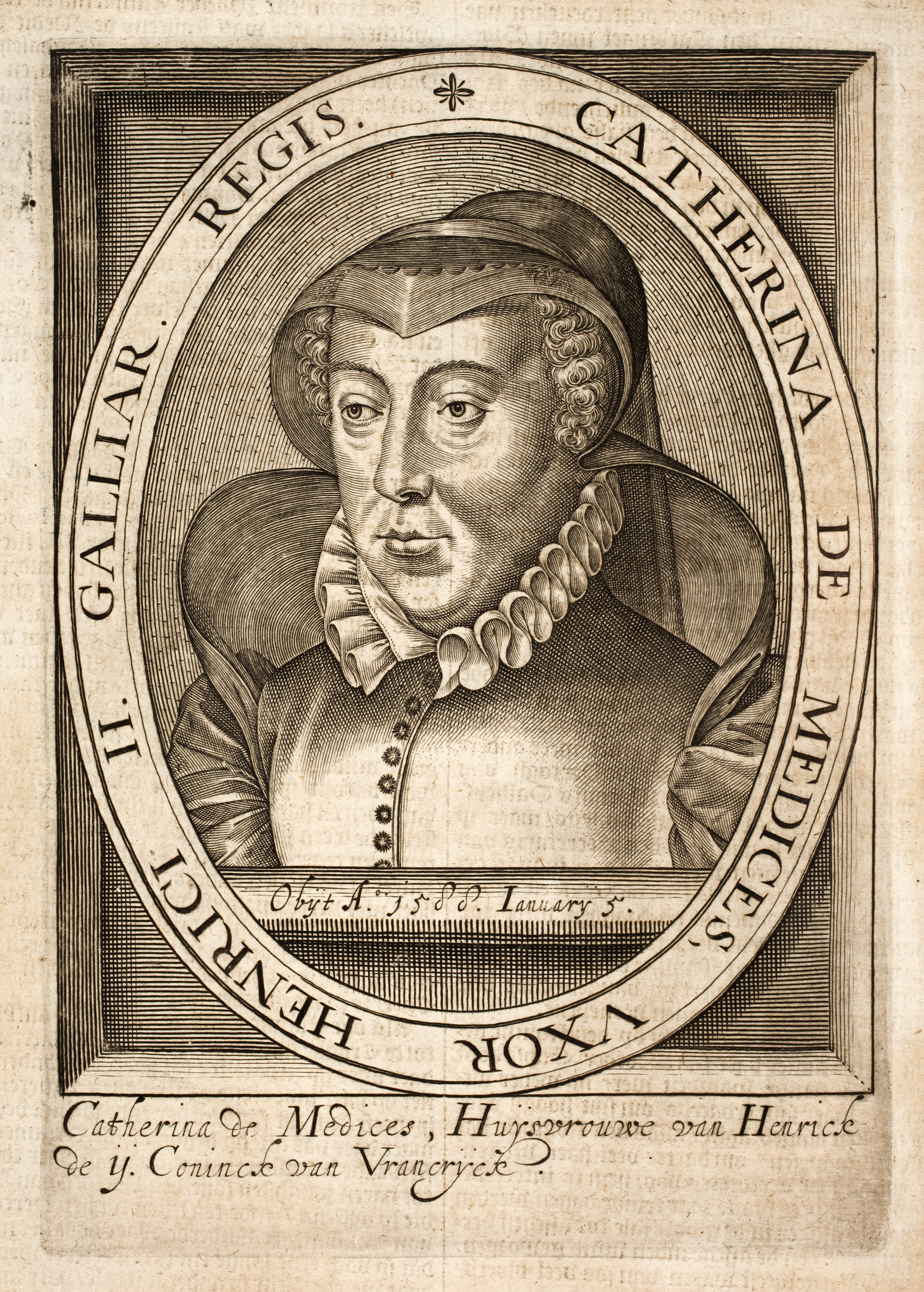
Engraving of Catherine de' Medici

In the afternoon the council met in the Tuileries gardens, in attendance were Catherine, Charles, Retz, Tavannes, Nevers and René de Birague who had recently replaced Morvillier as Chancellor. The notion that Téligny's 4,000 troops might enter Paris and enact their revenge was floated. There is no evidence that such a plan was seriously underway. The council agreed on a pre-emptive strike against the leading Huguenots, around two dozen noblemen still in the capital after the wedding. There is no evidence that there was any dissent on the council to this course of action. This decided the nature of the strike had to be established, would the figures be arrested and tried by the Parlement, or would it be extra-legal? With the overboiling situation in the capital the former was impractical. Paris was overflowing with war hardened men, and adherents who would defend them .

=== Second council ===
The council met again after dinner, with the same figures in attendance. Tavannes and Nevers argued for the lives of Navarre and Condé and it was agreed they would be given the option of death or the Mass. The events are recorded in several of the memoires of the participants, however each is keen to pin the blame on others. Tavannes' Memoires written by his son during the reign of Navarre are keen to present him as having argued for sparing Navarre and Condé, he however had a strong vested interest in doing this given the time in which he was writing. D'Aubigne writes that Nevers was the one to argue for sparing Navarre and Condé due to their blood relation. However what all memoires written by participants agree on is that de Retz wanted to spare no one. Having agreed on the course of action, Guise was summoned to the Louvre and brought up to speed with the council’s decision.

Around 10pm Jean le Charron, the mayor of Paris, and Claude Marcel, former prêvot, were summoned to the Louvre, they were ordered to take all necessary steps to secure the capital, including shutting the gates, immobilising boats on the Seine, arming the militia and assembly artillery outside the Hôtel de Ville. These orders were intended as a precautionary measure, if something went wrong with the kill squads and the Protestant nobility attempted a counterattack, these measures would smother it. As they hurried back to the Hôtel de Ville to enact these orders, the streets of the city were once again calm.

=== Third council ===
In the final of the three meetings, at midnight, Guise, Aumale, Anjou, Angoulême and Montpensier drew up the specifics of the kill list that was to be enacted, and divided responsibility among themselves for handling the various targets. Guise was to strike at Coligny, affording him his vengeance, then head across the Seine to attack targets in the faubourg Saint-Germain where much of the Huguenot aristocracy resided. Montpensier would handle those nobles staying in the Louvre including Condé and Navarre.

The king, tiring for the day was spending his late evening with the Huguenot La Rochefoucauld, a close childhood friend of his. Conscious of what was to come he urged La Rochefoucauld to spend the night with him. The young gentleman however refused, inclined to sleep somewhere more comfortable and headed off to the Princess of Condé's chambers.

=== Decision making ===
On 26 August Charles wrote to Mondoucet, explaining how in the wake of the initial assault on the Admiral, the leading Huguenots unable to await justice at his hands had planned to undertake revenge against everyone they held responsible. In order to avoid this 'pernicious enterprise' he had been obliged to permit Guise to assassinate the Admiral and his adherents. When Charles says 'he' made this decision, it is generally assumed he is referring to the decision of the collective conseil privé

Holt characterises the leading forces inside the council meeting that decided on the 'surgical strike' as being Retz, Nevers, Anjou and Birague. He lays particular responsibility for the assassinations at the feet of Anjou, highlighting his later enthusiasm for expanding the slaughter of Protestants in a letter he wrote to the governor of Saumur.

Estèbe has an agreement being reached in the morning of 23 August between Catherine and Anjou that Coligny and his confederates must die, so that their involvement in the attempt on Coligny's life on 22 August was not uncovered. They then approached the king and began work on convincing him, with Catherine and de Retz doing the work to bring him around to the evils of Coligny, highlighting the killing of François, the surprise of Meaux and various other outrages. She further blackmailed him saying she would leave if he did not put an end to the Huguenot menace, and he would have no city for Paris would surely be seized by the Huguenots. After two hours of berating the king he snapped and agreed to the liquidation of the Huguenots, the rest of the council already being on board with the program.

In Thompson's telling, Catherine verbally beats the weak willed Charles into submission with carrying out the assassinations. There is little evidence to credibly support such accounts of the councils of 23 August, the contents of the council meeting largely coming from various figures trying to exonerate themselves. Jouanna affords the king more agency, and suggests that the continued threats of the Huguenot nobles to take justice into their own hands, reminding him of the forceful behaviour of Coligny in the past when advocating for the Spanish war caused him to agree to their liquidation. The Protestants, backed by their own private army, presented a challenge to Charles' uncontested royal authority, something he had been willing to put aside in the sake of peace, but which had become difficult in the light of the events that transpired on 23 August.

Diefendorf argues that while there may not have in fact been a Protestant plot to seize the capital and kill the king, the fact such rumours were flooding the streets make it plausible that the king would have believed that was the reality. Even if he did not fear the Protestants bursting into the Louvre, he may have feared a new civil war, and desired to cut the head off his opponent in the mistaken belief such action would smother it in its infancy.

== Assassination and a massacre ==
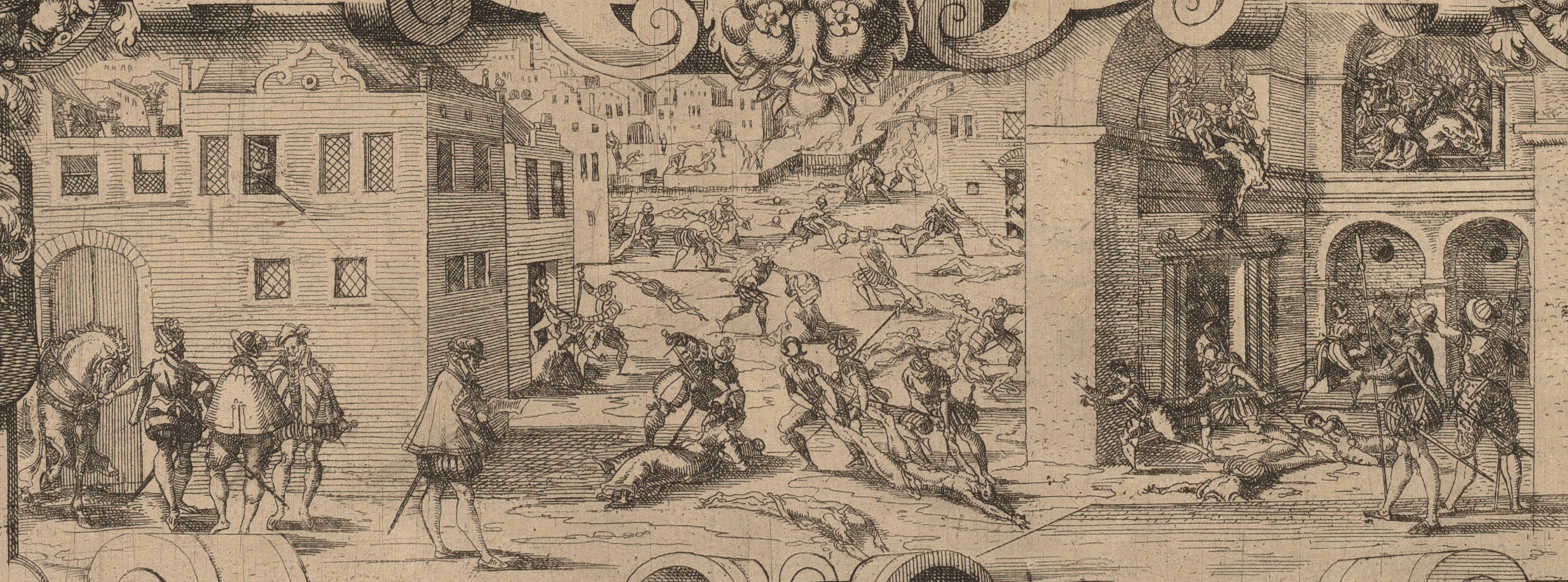
Bas de page detail from a portrait print of Coligny, Jost Amman, 1573. Coligny is shot at left, and killed at right.

In the early hours of 24 August, the kill squads assembled, drawn from the Swiss Guard as well as Anjou's personal bodyguard. The king ordered the city guard watch the streets while the assassinations were taking place, a key factor in what was to unfold, due to the guard being filled with radical Catholics. Several Huguenots, hearing the commotion of the kill squads assembling, approached them, and after beginning to quarrel were executed.

Between 3am to 4am they struck, fanning out to their various responsibilities across the city. Guise approached the residence of Coligny accompanied by Aumale and Angoulême on horseback, with men on foot alongside. On the way to rue de Béthisy, they had to obtain arms from the gun shops, ill-prepared as they were. The head of his guard Cosseins, killing the necessary defenders for him to make it easier. Navarre's Swiss attempted to barricade themselves throwing furniture in front of the door, but it was breached and they were killed on the stairs up to Coligny's chamber. Now inside, 5 men went up to Coligny's quarters while Guise waited down below. Upstairs Coligny, Paré, Muis the interpreter and Coligny's pastor Merlin heard the commotion. Cornaton shouted up 'We are lost, They have forced the interior door.' Coligny stood in his nightgown while Muis mumbled prayers. The Admiral was quite calm, and instructed those with him to flee up onto the rooftops through the attic. With his confederates escaped to the rooftops Coligny awaited the entry of the men into his chambers. Muis remained behind with him in the room.

The duke's servant, Janowitz de Besme entered, Besme remarked to the Admiral "Oh Admiral, Admiral, you sleep too deeply... Are you not the Admiral?" To which he responded "Yes I am him, But you are too young a soldier to speak thus to an old captain. At least have respect for my age." As he passed his sword through the Admiral, Besme remarked "I am old enough to put you to rest!". Guise hearing the noise from down below asked him if it was done, to which he replied in the affirmative, lifting the body with the help of the Gascon Sarlabous and pushing it out the window. Coligny not yet dead tried to cling on to the frame, but was overpowered and tossed out. The duke, having satisfied himself with an inspection of the body and with dawn about to break, told those with him "enough to the poor man" and departed. Having successfully killed Coligny, Guise moved on to pursuit of his next target Gabriel de Lorges, Count of Montgomery but he had caught wind of what was unfolding and was attempting to leave the city.

When local militant Catholics discovered the corpse of Coligny where it had been left on the street, they mutilated it, cutting off the hands, head and genitals. This done they dragged it around the streets for the next few days of massacre, set it on fire, and finally dumped it in the Seine. Haton observed that during these days a trial was held for Coligny's corpse by some Parisians, with the various citizens acting as judge and court officials.

== Aftermath ==
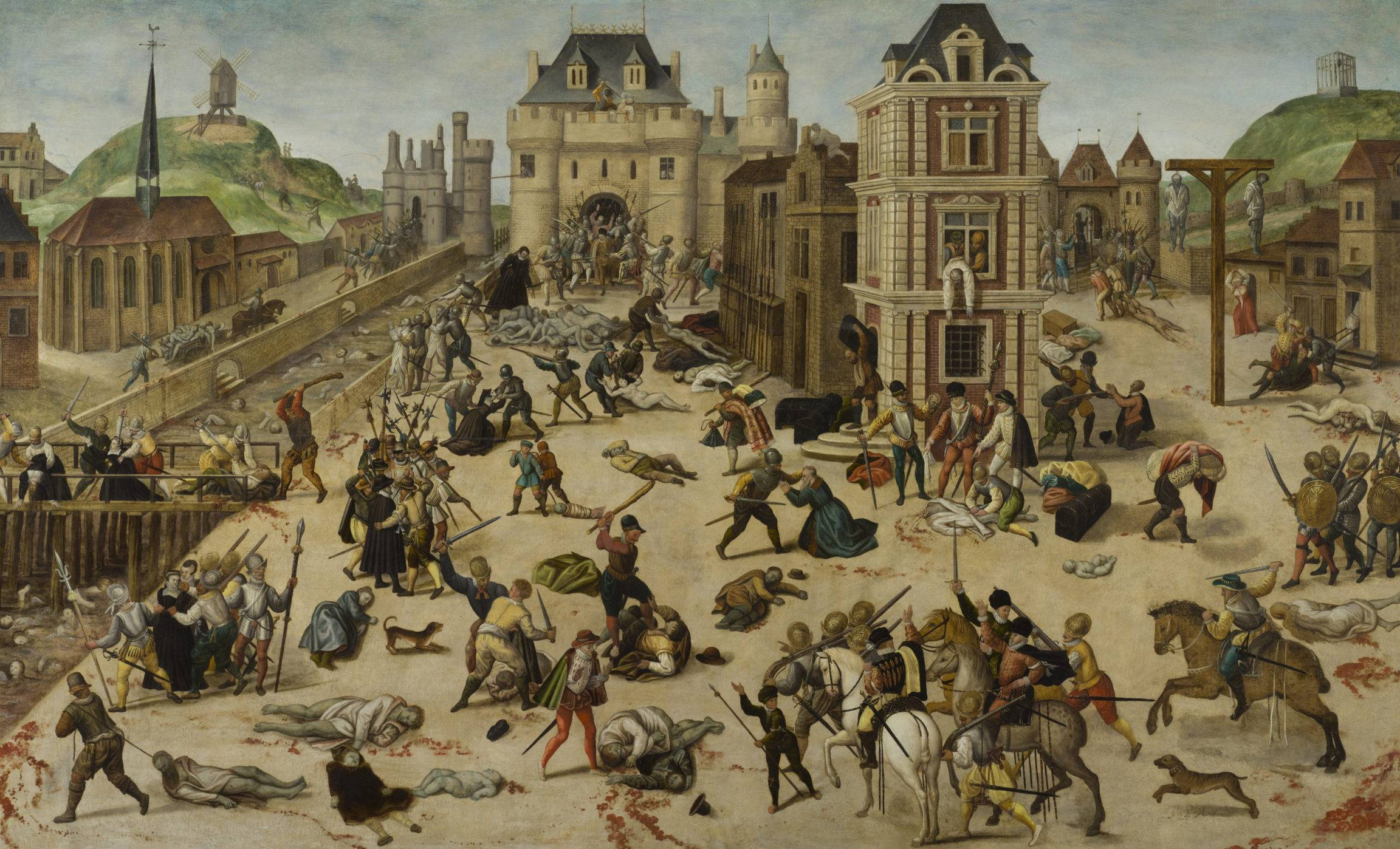
Painting by François Dubois, a Huguenot painter born circa 1529 in Amiens, who settled in Switzerland. Although Dubois did not witness the massacre, he depicts Admiral Coligny's body hanging out of a window at the rear to the right. To the left rear, Catherine de' Medici is shown emerging from the Louvre Palace to inspect a heap of bodies.

While he had led the attack on Coligny, Guise was displeased by how the situation developed over the following days. He took several Protestants under his protection, including the daughter of Michel de l'Hôpital. It was not however a fully magnanimous gesture and Guise did intend for the children he protected to be baptised as Catholics.

The Parlement delighted at the execution of the man they had put a bounty on in 1569 ordered that his remains be put on display.

During examination of Coligny's papers, Catherine found a letter to the king, and a letter to Téligny, in which Coligny championed the notion that the king's greatest enemy was that of Spain and England, and that he should never cease until both are destroyed.

Due to the influence of Morvilliers it was agreed that some legal justice would be taken against Coligny alongside the extra-legal. The Admiral was judged guilty of lèse-majesté and was hanged in effigy from a model made of hay. His coat of arms was dragged through the streets of Paris and all his property was seized. Thus Coligny's assassination on the morning of 24 August was brought into the legal sphere.

== Sources ==
- Bourgeon, J.L. (1992). L'Assassinat de Coligny. Geneva: Librairie Droz.
- Bourgeon, J.L. (1990). "Le Parlement et la Saint-Barthélemy". Bibliothèque de l'École des Chartes. 148. doi:10.3406/bec.1990.450570.
- Carroll, Stuart (2009). Martyrs and Murderers: The Guise Family and the Making of Europe. Oxford University Press.
- Diefendorf, Barbara (1991). Beneath the Cross: Catholics and Huguenots in Sixteenth Century Paris. Oxford University Press.
- Estèbe, Janine (1968). Tocsin pour une Massacre: La Saison des Saint-Barthélemy. Éditions du Centurion.
- Holt, Mack P. (2005). The French Wars of Religion, 1562-1629. Cambridge University Press.
- Holt, Mack (2002). The Duke of Anjou and the Politique Struggle During the Wars of Religion. Cambridge University Press.
- Jouanna, Arlette (2007). The St Bartholomew's Day Massacre: The Mysteries of a Crime of State. Manchester University Press.
- Knecht, Robert (2010). The French Wars of Religion, 1559-1598. Routledge.
- Maréjole, Jean (1983). La Réforme, la Ligue, l'Édit de Nantes. Tallandier.
- Roelker, Nancy (1996). One King, One Faith: The Parlement of Paris and the Religious Reformation of the Sixteenth Century. University of California Press.
- Salmon, J.H.M (1975). Society in Crisis: France during the Sixteenth Century. Metheun & Co.
- Shimizu, J. (1970). Conflict of Loyalties: Politics and Religion in the Career of Gaspard de Coligny, Admiral of France, 1519–1572. Geneva: Librairie Droz.
- Sutherland, Nicola (1980). The Huguenot Struggle for Recognition. Yale University Press.
- Sutherland, Nicola (1973). The Massacre of St Bartholomew and the European Conflict 1559-1572. Macmillan.
- Sutherland, Nicola (1981). "The Assassination of Francois Duc de Guise February 1563". The Historical Journal. 24 2.
- Thompson, James (1909). The Wars of Religion in France 1559-1576: The Huguenots, Catherine de Medici and Philip II. Chicago University Press.
