= Assassination of the Duke of Guise =

Assassination of the Duke of Guise may refer to:

- Assassination of the Duke of Guise (1563)
- Assassination of the Duke of Guise (1588)
