= Battle of Dreux =

1562 battle in the French Wars of Religion

- Part of the First French War of Religion (1562–1563)
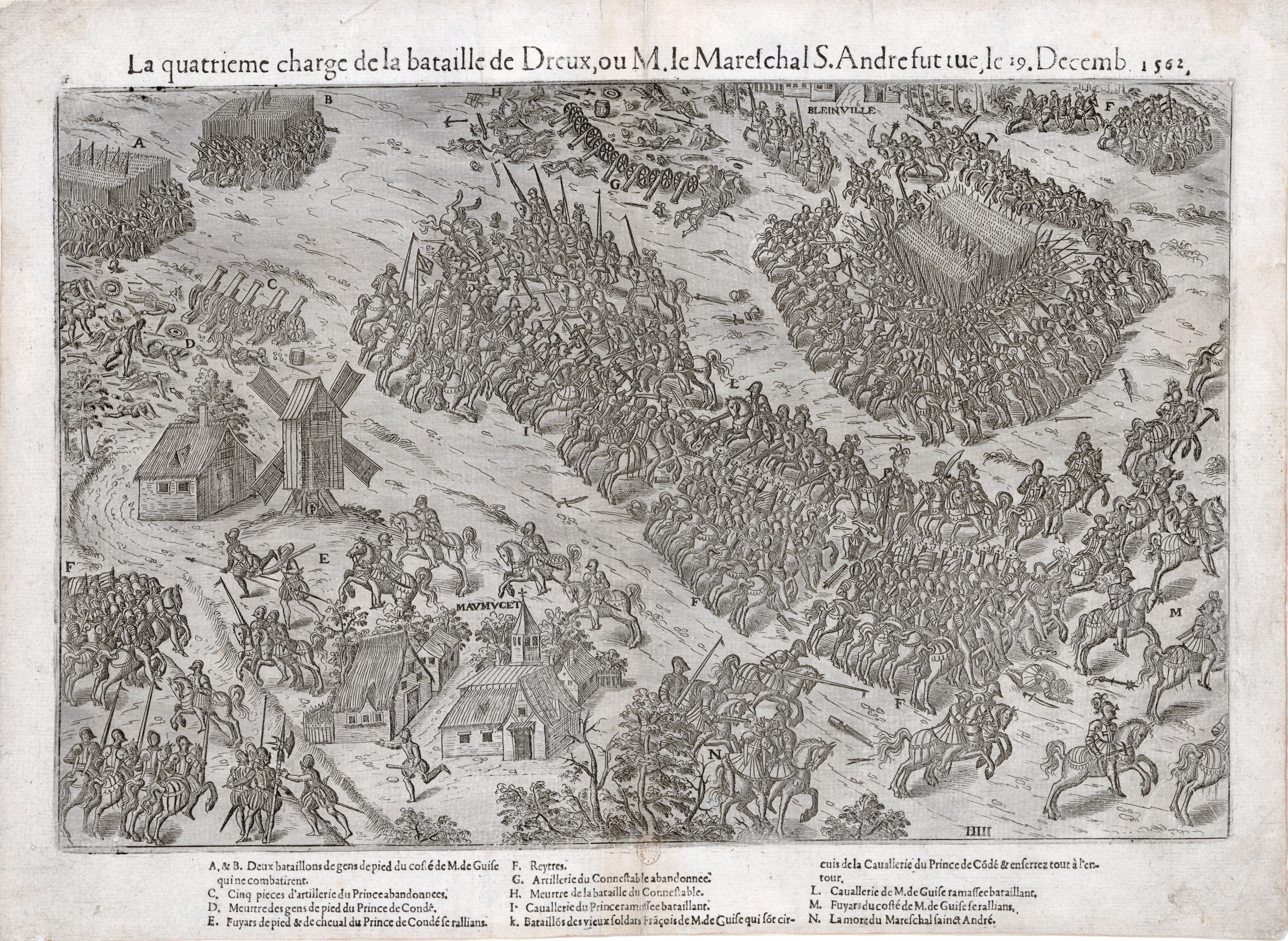
Date	19 December 1562
Location	Dreux, France 48.675°N 1.389°E
Result	Catholic victory

Belligerents
French Catholic royal army	French Huguenot forces

Commanders and leaders
Anne de Montmorency (POW); Jacques d'Albon, Seigneur de Saint André †; Francis, Duke of Guise	Louis I, Prince of Condé (POW); Gaspard de Coligny

Strength
16,500 infantry, 2,500 cavalry, 22 guns	8,500 infantry, 4,500 cavalry, some artillery

Casualties and losses
3,000 infantry, 1,000 cavalry	3,000 casualties, 1,500 captured

The Battle of Dreux was fought on 19 December 1562 between Catholics and Huguenots. The Catholics were led by Anne de Montmorency while Louis I, Prince of Condé, led the Huguenots. Though commanders from both sides were captured, the French Catholics won the battle which would constitute the first major engagement of the French Wars of Religion and the only major engagement of the first French War of Religion.

== Opening moves ==
This was the first major engagement of the French Wars of Religion. The Protestant army encountered the Catholic royal army on the road to Dreux while attempting to move north into Normandy. They began with a slight disadvantage because they had not posted sufficient scouts around their march, largely because Coligny had persuaded Condé that the Catholics would not attack and therefore there was some confusion about the line of battle. Although the Catholics were superior in numbers and their infantry was much more experienced, they were severely lacking in heavy cavalry, the main offensive weapon of set battles in the period. This made them cautious about engaging with the Huguenots particularly on this battlefield which was open and gently sloping, perfect for large cavalry charges. In an effort to negate this advantage, the royal army set up a defensive position between the two villages of Blainville and Épinay. The Protestant army was organised into two lines. The first was made up of their cavalry, largely gendarmes and German reiters (pistol-armed) heavy cavalry. The second line contained their infantry which was a mixture of mercenary Landsknechts and French infantry. The idea was that the cavalry would bear the brunt of the fighting and the inferior infantry would be used as an anchor for the battle line and a rallying point. The two armies stood around for two hours looking at each other before the action began—La Noue says in his Discours that this was because it was the first time two French armies had faced each other in over a century, and each had friends and brothers on the other side and was afraid to begin what would no doubt become the first act in a great tragedy.

== Battle ==
The battle itself was divided into four main movements. In the first, the Huguenots launched a large cavalry charge at the Catholic left which it routed fairly quickly and in a short time the entire left wing of the Catholic army had disintegrated and was fleeing. During this stage Anne de Montmorency had his horse shot out from under him, and he was taken prisoner, being quickly shuttled to Orléans as captive. Only the Swiss managed to hold in the centre despite taking very high casualties. Much of the Protestant cavalry now pursued their fleeing enemies back towards their baggage train which they proceeded to loot.

During the second phase of the battle, the majority of the combat was borne by the Swiss who were repeatedly attacked by cavalry and then by the Protestant Landsknecht regiment. Although they routed the Landsknechts and almost recaptured the Catholic artillery they were eventually broken by a final charge by fresh Huguenot gendarmes. Seeing this, many more of the Protestant cavalry moved off to loot the Catholic baggage train in the rear leaving their infantry without cavalry support.

It was at this moment, during the third phase, that Guise and Saint-André, who had held back till now, advanced with their fresh troops. They swept aside the Huguenot French infantry, who were poorly armed with few pikemen, and the remaining Huguenot Landsknecht regiment retreated without striking a blow. The remaining Protestant cavalry, now exhausted after several hours of combat, retreated in fairly good order but it was during this withdrawal that Condé was captured.

In the fourth and final phase of the battle, it appeared that the Catholic army had won. However, behind the woods near Blainville, Coligny had rallied about a thousand French and German horse and re-emerged to attack again. This could have changed the course of the battle again as the few hundred Catholic heavy cavalry left were in no position to face this attack. However, Guise had ordered his final reliable infantry regiment, a veteran French unit under Martigues, to form a square just south of Blainville. They poured arquebus fire into the advancing Huguenots who, having used their lances earlier, could not break the pikemen. Realising he could not win and with darkness approaching, Coligny ordered a retreat, leaving the field to the Catholics.

== Aftermath ==
=== Wake of the battle ===
In the aftermath of the battle, the costs began to make themselves clear. Of the 30,000 men who had fought, an estimated 9–10,000 were killed or wounded, making it one of the bloodiest battles of the period. Ambroise Paré, a surgeon sent from Paris to tend the wounded gentlemen, described how, '[he] observed for a good league all around the ground completely covered [with dead bodies], all dispatched in less than two hours'. A lot of wounded men, left on the field at the end of the day, succumbed to shock and cold during the bitter night which was as recalled by trooper Jean de Mergey, 'the coldest I ever felt'. Further, while the Catholics had definitely won the battle, they suffered heavy casualties among their cavalry and an estimated 800 of them had died. This had a disproportionate impact on the French nobility, among whom notably Saint-André, Francois II, Duke of Nevers and Gabriel de Montmorency were casualties.

With the death of Saint-André and the capture of Montmorency in the battle, the Duke of Guise was left in unchallenged military command of the crown's war effort, thwarting Catherine de' Medici's plans for a negotiated settlement and making inevitable a final confrontation at Orléans.

=== End of the war ===
Though a victory for the Catholics, they were unable to capitalise on it and it took them almost seven weeks before they were ready to launch an attack on Orléans, the final Huguenot stronghold on the Loire. In this time, the Protestants managed to reinforce the city with their remaining infantry and rally their essentially unharmed cavalry force. It was with this that Coligny reestablished Protestant control over the important towns in lower Normandy. This in combination with the assassination of the Duke of Guise at the culmination of the siege of Orleans meant that the first civil war ended, not with a decisive defeat of the Huguenots, but rather with the Edict of Amboise that allowed for a restricted level of Huguenot worship.

=== Strategic military lessons ===
There were several lessons learnt from the battle, which were taken on board by both sides. The royal army became more convinced of the effectiveness of the Swiss mercenaries and continued to hire units of them throughout the French Wars of Religion. Conversely, both sides decided that the German Landsknechts were poor troops and therefore ceased to employ them for the early civil wars; however, they would prove their worth later during sieges, where their versatility made them much more effective than the Swiss whose failure to use firearms severely limited their effectiveness.

The battle also cemented the view that heavy cavalry with lances, far from being outdated, were the most important troop type on the battlefield and both sides would continue to raise more heavy cavalry in the future at the expense of infantry. The German reiters, armed with pistols they could fire before a charge, had shown themselves as particularly effective, mauling the Swiss regiment which was noticed by both sides. Dreux was also a psychological turning point for the French as it removed the last barrier to the mutual slaughter of French military elites which would prove very damaging for the French state later on. Lastly, the battle had an important effect on how the French royal army thought about pitched battles. They had won it only by the narrowest margin, as it could have easily been a Huguenot victory, and this strengthened the view that battles were immensely costly and very risky events that should be avoided unless victory was almost assured. The crown could not afford the destruction of its main defensive force. Even when they did win impressive victories, they were unable to move fast enough to take full advantage and seize Protestant strongholds so the results of these battles were more often than not disappointing. The lessons learned at Dreux were taken to heart and would be felt over the next fourteen years as the wars of religion continued.
