= Charles de Louviers =

- sieur de Maurevert
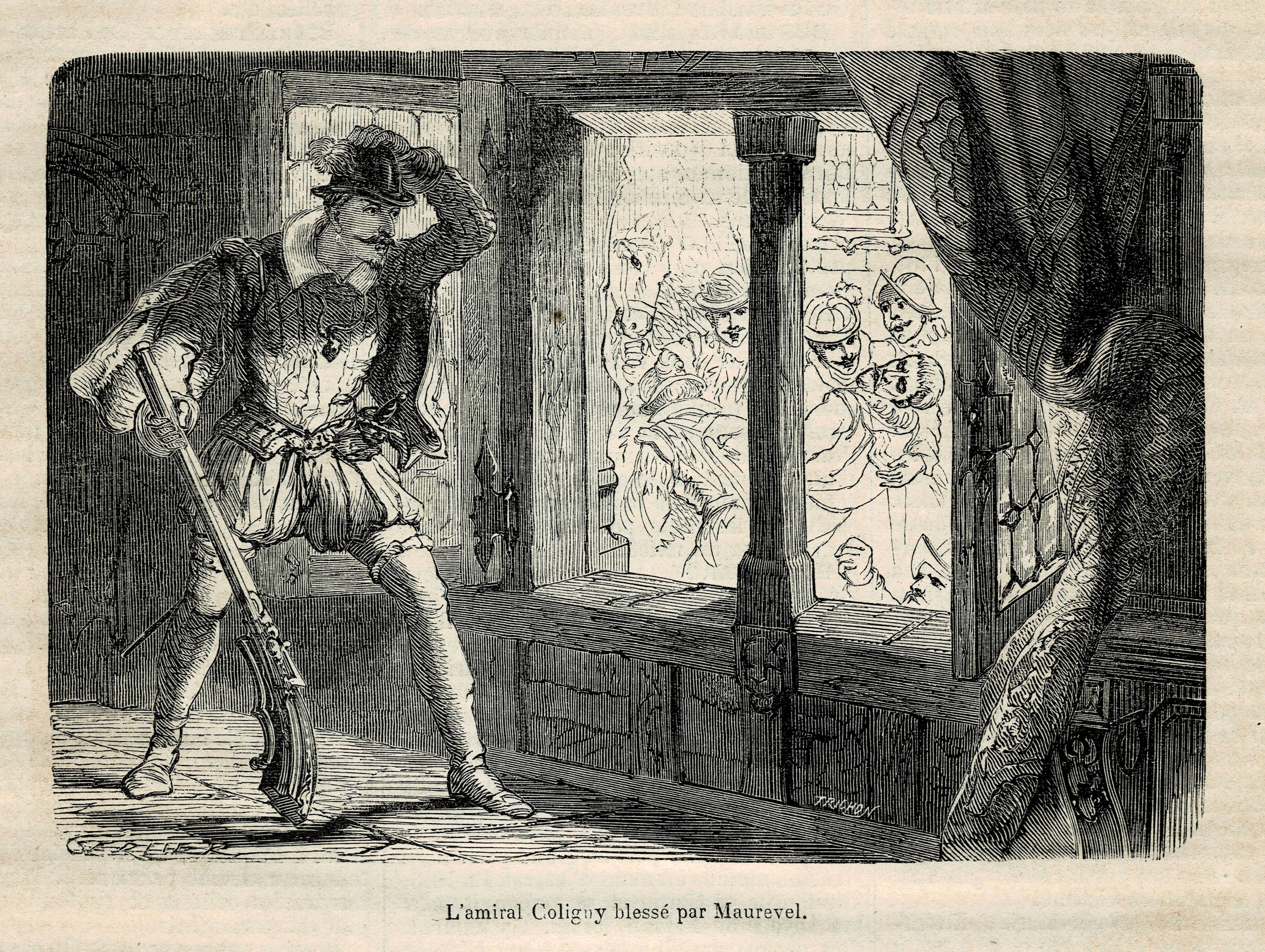
- Nineteenth-century illustration of Maurevert's attempted assassination of Admiral Coligny
- Died: 14 April 1583; Kingdom of France
- Spouse: Marguerite Acqunio (d. 1579)

Charles de Louviers, sieur de Maurevert (French pronunciation: [ʃaʁl də luvje]; (d. 14 April 1583) was a French noble and assassin during the French Wars of Religion, whose failed assassination of Admiral Coligny led to the Massacre of Saint Bartholomew. Maurevert was from a prominent Champagne family in a region that was increasingly torn apart by intra-family conflict. He served as a page for the Guise family in his youth before committing a murder that forced him to go on the run. By 1569 he had converted to Protestantism and was serving under the seigneur de Mouy in their rebel army. Deciding to kill his commanding officer, he took the body over to the Catholic camp and was rewarded with money and a knighthood.

In 1572, he tried to assassinate Admiral Coligny, however, his bullets were unable to fatally wound Coligny, and he was forced to flee the capital. The failed assassination led to angry recriminations among the leading nobles, which pushed the court towards a policy of elimination of the Protestant noble leadership. Maurevert meanwhile received a pension from the Duke of Guise in 1573, and then a royal pension upon Henri III's ascension in 1575. His relations with his family were poor and he murdered a cousin in 1574. Increasingly paranoid he went everywhere with guards and chainmail. In 1583, the son of his first assassination victim caught up with him, and they both died in the subsequent engagement on 14 April 1583.

== Early life and family ==
Maurevert was from a Hurepoix family that had only fairly recently been ennobled. His family was of some means and he inherited lordships in a territory encompassed by Melun and Provins. Maurevert became a page in the household of François, Duke of Guise, he left this role in favour of one under Claude, Duke of Aumale before being forced into exile after killing his tutor.

In 1561 he secured an advantageous marriage to Marguerite Acquino, daughter of a Neopolitan exile. Shortly thereafter he became a Protestant. There would be no children from the marriage, and she would predecease her husband, dying in 1579 with her property and titles willed to Guise.

== Mouy ==
Maurevert defected to the Protestant cause during the third civil war, claiming disgust at his former Catholic patrons, entering the service of the seigneur de Mouy a lieutenant of Gaspard II de Coligny. Mouy was a member of the powerful Raguier family, one of the two dominant local families of Champagne. Maurevert had familial connections with the Raguier. The two became close, Mouy supplying Maurevert from his personal funds and becoming 'bedfellows'. While the Protestant force was occupying the town of Niort, Maurevert assassinated Mouy on 9 October 1569, taking advantage of a moment when Mouy had departed from his troop to 'take care of his necessities' to draw a pistol and shoot Mouy in the genitals. Maurevert had surprised his commander from behind, killing him instantly with a single shot. The deed accomplished he fled to the royal camp where he was warmly received by the king's brother Anjou. The rest of the royal army was less keen on him, seeing him as untrustworthy having killed his own benefactor. The king for his part saw an advantage in the situation, and on 10 October wrote to Alençon in Paris asking him to induct Maurevert as a chevalier de l'ordre de Saint-Michel. Alongside receiving the collar of the order, he would be gifted 2000 livres by Anjou. Coligny for his part swore he would revenge himself upon the murderer of his lieutenant.

Several years later, in 1571, Maurevert re-wrote his will signing over all his goods to his half-brother Pierre de Foissy. Cutting out the family that would have received his inheritance earned him their ire, and could explain the violent confrontations he had with them in the following years.

== Coligny ==
Maurevert was determined to assassinate Coligny, he was provided access to a house overlooking the admiral's regular path back to his Parisian residence, introduced to the residents by François de Villiers, seigneur de Chailly. Chailly was the duke of Guise's surintendant. On his way back from a meeting in the Louvre on 22 August 1572, Gaspard II de Coligny was shot from a first storey window by Maurevert, the arquebus projectile passed through his hand and arm, leaving him non-fatally wounded. The bullet would be extracted from his elbow and one of his fingers amputated. Several explanations have been offered for why he bent down, foiling Maurevert's effort; to spit in the street, stopping to adjust his shoe, and stopping to open a letter. The house from which Maurevert fired the shot was owned by a client of the Guise family, specifically Pierre de Villemur, the former tutor of the duke of Guise.

As Coligny was carried from the street he pointed out to where Maurevert had taken the shot from, and several of his gentleman (Saint-Auban and Séré) entered pursuit. The assassination botched, Maurevert began his escape, mounting a horse provided for him from the Guise stables and making off. He exchanged this horse at the Porte Saint-Antoine for a fresh Spanish mount. At Charenton they were able to arrest an accomplice, Georges Postel a servant of Maurevert's uncle, who had another fresh mount for the would-be assassin. Maurevert took refuge in the château of the seigneur de Chailly at Corbeil, the drawbridge raised behind him. When his pursuers arrived, muskets pointing out the windows dissuaded them from any further efforts. Villemur and Chailly were related, they were also connected to the same Raguier family Mouy was a member of.

The Papal Nuncio, Salviati opined that had Maurevert fired more accurately, the Massacre that followed in the next days would never have occurred. Historians have agreed with this assessment, arguing the Protestant nobility would have vacated the capital and entered open civil war rather than staying in the capital and demanding justice. The crown, increasingly alarmed by the angry threats against various Catholic notables who were held to Maurevert's paymaster, decided to pre-emptively eliminate the Protestant leadership in the capital, however, this spiralled out of control into the massacre.

== Aftermath ==
On 25 September 1573, Maurevert was granted a pension of 2000 livres by the duke of Guise until such time as the king provided him with an equivalent sum. By 1575 Maurevert was receiving a royal pension of a smaller sum of 650 livres, as such the Guise pension was subtracted against it giving him 650 from Henri III and 1350 from Guise. By this time he had the nickname 'king's killer.'

In 1574 Maurevert would get into a dispute with his cousin, resulting in him killing his relative. In 1579 he would get into a fight with a nephew that cost him one of his arms. Conscious that one of the people he had killed was likely to seek vengeance against him at some point he went everywhere accompanied by armed guards and wore chainmail at all times.

Mouy's family had not forgiven Maurevert for his earlier assassination, on 14 April 1583 Mouy's son confronted him, and they both died of wounds in the subsequent fight.

== Sources ==
- Baird, Henry (1880). History of the Rise of the Huguenots: Vol 2 of 2. Hodder & Stoughton.
- Carroll, Stuart (2009). Martyrs and Murderers: The Guise Family and the Making of Europe. Oxford University Press.
- Diefendorf, Barbara (1991). Beneath the Cross: Catholics and Huguenots in Sixteenth Century Paris. Oxford University Press.
- Holt, Mack P. (2005). The French Wars of Religion, 1562-1629. Cambridge University Press.
- Jouanna, Arlette (2007). The St Bartholomew's Day Massacre: The Mysteries of a Crime of State. Manchester University Press.
- Knecht, Robert (2014). Catherine de' Medici. Routledge.
- Knecht, Robert (2016). Hero or Tyrant? Henry III, King of France, 1574-1589. Routledge.
- Salmon, J.H.M (1975). Society in Crisis: France during the Sixteenth Century. Metheun & Co.
