= Assassination of François, Duke of Guise =

1563 murder in Orléans, France

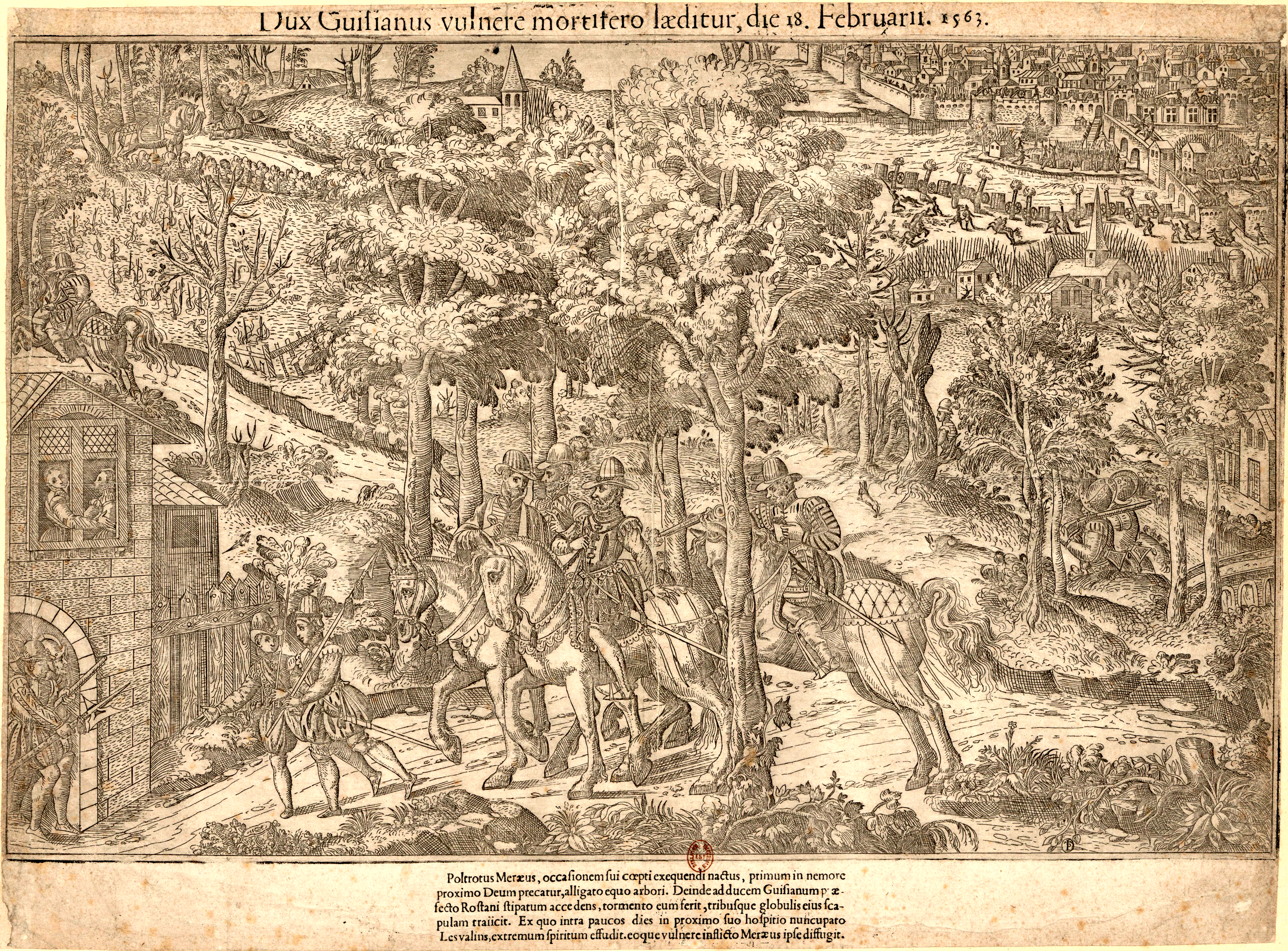
Assassination of the Duke of Guise, engraved by Jacque Tortorel and Jean Perrissin in 1570

On 24 February 1563, François, Duke of Guise was assassinated by the Huguenot Jean de Poltrot during the Siege of Orléans. His death represents a critical turning point in the French Wars of Religion. It would be the first major assassination in what would become a blood feud between the various aristocratic houses which would see the deaths of Louis I, Prince of Condé and the St. Bartholomew's Day massacre follow. It also proved a decisive factor in bringing the first War of Religion to a close in the Edict of Amboise.

== Background ==
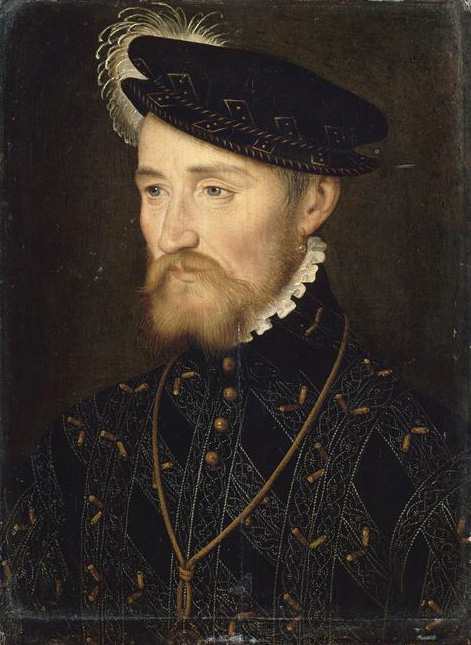
A portrait of the Duke of Guise by François Clouet

=== The Guise and their governance ===
The Guise family, led by François, Duke of Guise and his brother Charles, Cardinal of Lorraine represented one of the most powerful noble families in France. The family was elevated to the peerage during the reign of Henry II, whose council they would grow to dominate by his death in 1559. With the beginning of the reign of the young Francis II the Guise quickly moved to consolidate control over the administration and crown finance, exerting a strong degree of influence over royal policy.

In opposition to this control, the Amboise conspiracy developed, with the aim of arresting both the Duke and his brother and taking control of the King for the Huguenot nobility. Having received word of the conspiracy ahead of time, the Guise were able to fight off the attempt, executing hundreds of those involved. Attempting to avenge this, the first assassination attempt was plotted against the duke of Guise, a staged hunting accident on 16 May 1560 that fell through after one of the conspirators betrayed the others.

The Duke blamed this, and the Amboise conspiracy, on the Prince of Condé, managing to secure his arrest and quick judgement of execution in October 1560. Before this could be carried out, the sudden death of Francis II induced a power vacuum that freed Condé. The ascension of Charles IX would sever their connections to the royal family that had existed through their niece’s marriage to Francis and, with the formation of a new regency council under Catherine de' Medici, they left court.

=== The First French War of Religion ===
On 1 March 1562, the Duke stopped at the town of Wassy while travelling to Paris, and encountered a Huguenot congregation. He and his gentlemen committed a massacre. This precipitated the first French War of Religion, with the Prince of Condé citing it in his 8 April Manifesto shortly after he began hostilities with the seizure of Orléans on 2 April. The Duke of Guise, alongside Antoine of Navarre, Anne de Montmorency and Jacques de Saint André took leadership of fighting the war against Condé on the crown’s behalf. After initial successes of those opposing the crown, the victory at the Siege of Rouen and the Battle of Dreux quickly turned the war in the crown's favour.

Concurrently, the death of Navarre at Rouen, and the death and capture respectively of Saint André and Montmorency at Dreux left the Duke in uncontested leadership of the crown's war efforts. As such, while the captured Montmorency and Condé, alongside Catherine, were in favour of a negotiated settlement, they were unable to stop the Duke from seeking a final decisive victory by besieging and capturing the last northern stronghold of Orléans. It was at this siege, close to its completion, where he was assassinated.

== An assassination and a funeral ==
=== Planning the assassination ===
Jean de Poltrot had first found himself involved in action against the Guise during the Conspiracy of Amboise, at which he was present as a page of Francois Bouchard. While he was able to escape the reprisals that followed, two of his kinsmen, including the leader of the conspiracy, La Renaudie, would be executed. With the beginnings of the French Wars of Religion, Poltrot would head to Orleans in the service of Jean de Parthenay-Larchêveque in 1562. After a trip to Lyons later in the year, he would return with letters for Gaspard II de Coligny, the leader of the anti crown forces now that Condé was a prisoner. At this time he was hired by Coligny to spy on the Duke’s camp besieging Orléans and given first 20, then 100 écus for this service. Successfully insinuating himself into the Duke's household, he spent several days procrastinating before deciding to act.

=== The night of 18 Feb 1563 ===
Poltrot was moved to action on the night of 18 Feb 1563 by word that the Duke was close to complete victory, and the siege would be won in the next 24 hours. The Duke was returning to his lodgings from the suburb of Portereau, where he had been in the trenches inspecting the final efforts of the sapping work under the city walls. To reach his lodgings, the Duke had to take a small ferry which could only carry three passengers, ensuring that, by the time he got close to home, he would be almost alone. Poltrot hid in the bushes alongside the path, allowing him to draw near enough to the Duke to fire his pistol at an effective range, shooting the Duke in the back before fleeing. This accomplished, Poltrot panicked in the dark of the night, losing his direction and failing to escape from the district. He would be arrested on suspicion of involvement and confess to the capturing soldiers.

=== Guise's last days ===
The wound was not at first considered life-threatening, however when he developed signs of what appeared to his doctors to be a fever on 22 Feb their painful operation to attempt to extract the bullet further worsened his condition. As he approached death and began to speak of desiring to apologise for Wassy and seek a 'good reformation' of the Catholic Church his more conservative family members Claude, Duke of Aumale and Louis I de Lorraine, Cardinal of Guise sought to ensure there were no rumours of Protestantism surrounding his end as there had been with the death of Navarre at Rouen. The hardline confessor Riez was selected for him, and they put out that he was reading the Epistle of James, a part of the Bible rejected by Martin Luther. On 24 Feb 1563 he died.

=== Crowds in Paris ===
The Duke's body was allowed to remain in state for 3 days in the Camp outside Orléans for his soldiers and nobles to offer respects. It would then be transferred to Paris where a large service would be held on 8 March with the Cathedral of Notre-Dame de Paris fitted out with the crest of the House of Lorraine. Finally on 19 March an elaborate public funeral attended by thousands of the people of Paris would be held, his popularity strong in the largely Catholic city that considered him their saviour for his victory at the Battle of Dreux.

== Confession and conspiracy ==
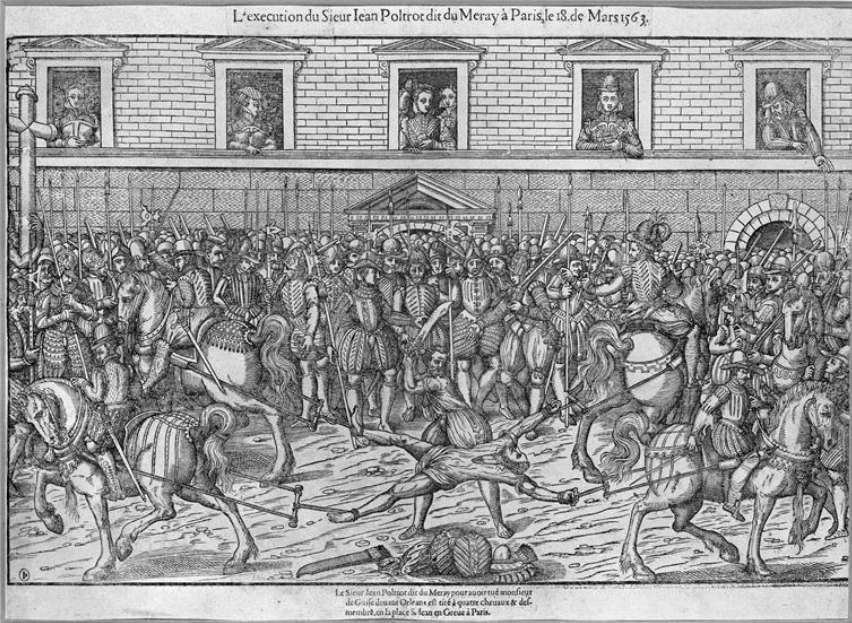
Poltrot de Méré being quartered, after the horses failed to accomplish the task.

=== Poltrot's testimonies ===
After his capture, Poltrot would be imprisoned and tortured in an effort to find out upon whose orders he assassinated the Duke. In his first testimony, delivered before Catherine and the council on 21 Feb, he would implicate Coligny, asserting that in his first visit to Orléans in June 1562 he had been solicited to do the deed but had refused, and had later relented to the Admiral's pressure when he was further implored to do the act by Theodore Beza. When pressed on potential further involvement, he would deny that Condé had been involved but suggested his assassination had been one piece of a much broader plot to assassinate many other high nobles.

He would then be taken to the Conciegerie in Paris for further interrogation, during which he would retract his assertion of Coligny's involvement, testifying instead in his final interrogation on 18 March that Jean de Parthenay-L'archêveque had been the instigator of his actions. Extracted under torture as these confessions were, and without any trial, there is no clear answer as to any potential orchestration, contemporary theories of involvement would include Condé and Catherine de' Medici.

Having been directly implicated in the first testimony before the court, Coligny would write in defence of himself on 12 March in which he would argue that several of Poltrot's asserted meetings had not taken place, and that when they had met, it had only been to discuss spying on the Duke's camp. He further highlighted several other inconsistencies in the account in relation to what name Poltrot had used for him, and suggesting if he wanted to assassinate the Duke of Guise he would have hired someone of a different character. Theodore Beza would likewise write in his own defence, arguing that he had sought justice for the Duke's crimes at Wassy through legal channels with Catherine de' Medici.

=== The fate of Poltrot ===
Having been subject to much torture, Poltrot would be executed before a large Parisian crowd on 18 March, the day before the Duke's funeral. While Coligny had been pressing the Parlement of Paris for a formal trial so he could clear his name, the execution was rushed through so that it would pre-empt the amnesty clause of the Edict of Amboise which came into force a day later. Failing to pull him apart by horse, he would be quartered while alive. Huguenots would sing songs in remembrance of him, considering him a martyr for his actions.

== Aftermath ==
=== The Edict of Amboise ===
The loss of their commander would prove dispiriting and distracting for the troops besieging Orléans and the city would not fall the next day. Free of the primary figure who had advocated for continued fighting, Catherine would negotiate the compromise peace of the Edict of Amboise with Condé and Montmorency that allowed for continued freedom of conscience but with more restricted sites of worship. The sudden peace would come as a shock to the Catholic population of Paris who had presumed themselves to be on the cusp of total victory, manifesting in anger against the crown. While it would secure several years of formal peace, war would resume in 1567.

=== Spiralling violence ===
While, in his final days, the Duke had urged for the forgiveness of his assassin, members of his family took a different approach. His widow Anna d'Este called for vengeance and, at a family council in Joinville in March 1563, the family decided on a plan to discredit Montmorency, who had taken his nephew Coligny under his protection, with the aim of campaigning for the crown to order the Admiral's arrest. Throughout 1563 they would face off with the House of Montmorency, who would, through their control of the regency council and the governorship of Paris, gain the upper hand; culminating in the crown's decision on 5 Jan 1564 to suspend investigation of potential involvement in the assassination for a 3-year period. Unable to achieve victory through legal channels, the feud would become one of assassination, with Henri I, Duke of Guise personally overseeing the death of Coligny during the opening hours of what would become the St Bartholomew's Day Massacre in 1572, before he in turn was assassinated with his brother in 1588.

== See also ==
- French Wars of Religion
- François, Duke of Guise
- Jean de Poltrot
- Assassination of Henri I, Duke of Guise
