= Siege of Orléans (1563) =

Battle of the French Wars of Religion

- Part of First French War of Religion (1562–1563)
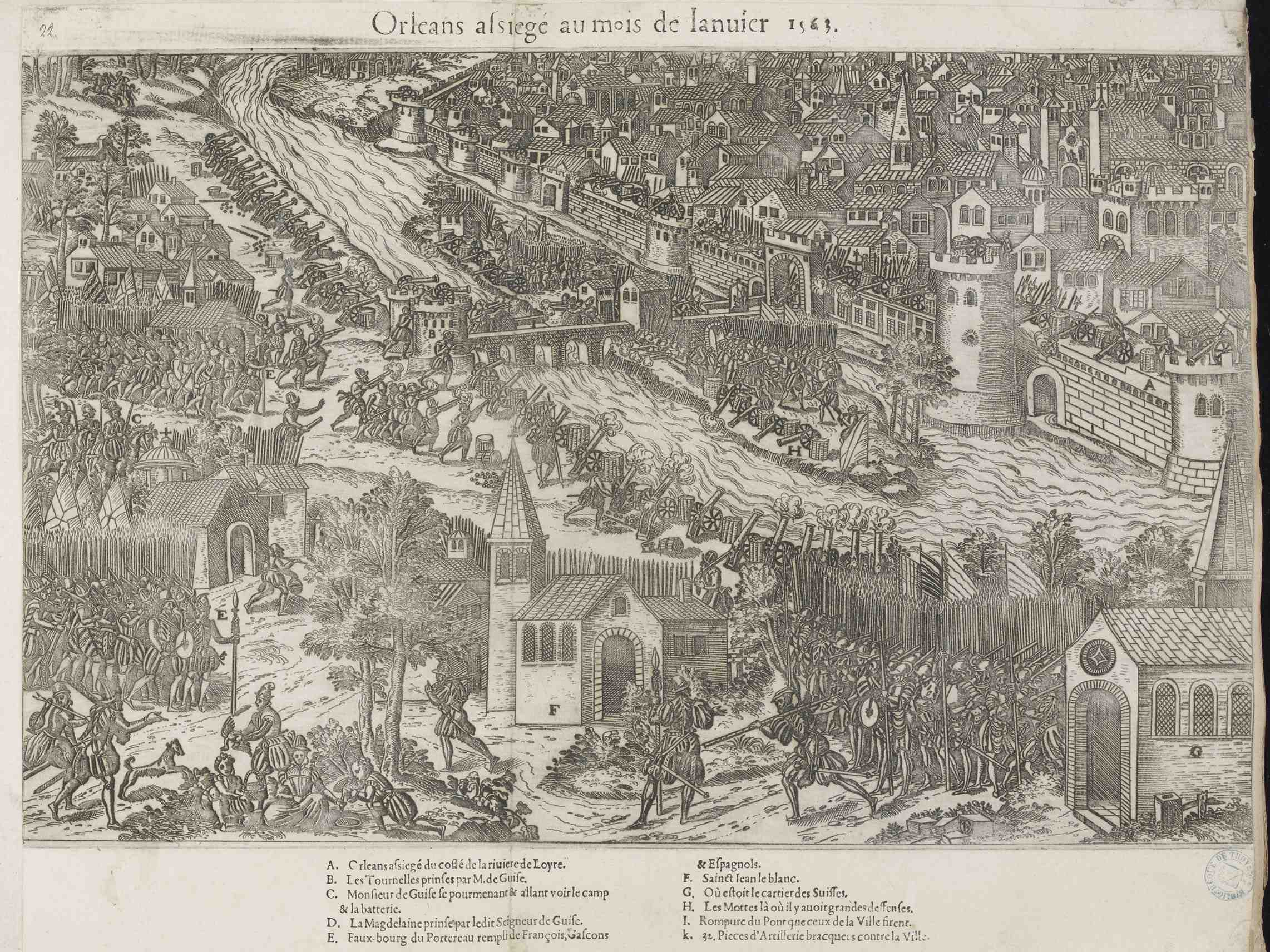
- The siege of Orléans, 1570 engraving by Tortorel and Perrissin.
Date	5 February 1563 – 19 February 1563
Location	Orléans, France 47.902°N 1.909°E
Result	Rebel victory Edict of Amboise

Belligerents
Huguenots	French crown

Commanders and leaders
François de Coligny d'Andelot	François of Guise †

Strength
Unknown	At least 10,000

The siege of Orléans was the final key military engagement of the first French War of Religion. Having lost the Battle of Dreux the rebel Huguenots fell back with their remaining forces to the city. François, Duke of Guise, the only non-captive royal commander, moved to lay siege to the town, hoping its capitulation would bring about a total victory for the crowns forces. However, despite reducing the suburbs, he would be assassinated at the siege before he could bring it to a conclusion. As a result the captive Louis, Prince of Condé and Anne de Montmorency at Catherine de' Medici's direction were able to negotiate a compromise end to the first war in the Edict of Amboise.

== Background ==
=== War declared ===
After François, Duke of Guise perpetrated the massacre of Vassy, Louis, Prince of Condé vacated Paris, where he and his followers had been based, intent on rebellion. He chose the city of Orléans to declare the start of this rebellion against the crown, seizing it on 2 April and issuing the manifesto of his revolt from the city on 8 April. Thus followed a wave of town seizures by Huguenots across France, seizing Tours, Le Havre, Rouen and Lyon among others. The city of Orléans became Protestant; only reformed worship was tolerated; its institutions (the governor, the city aldermen, etc.) were taken over and the bishop was removed in April 1562. Churches were desecrated and relics destroyed.

In May Catherine dispatched Villars and Vielleville to Orléans to offer terms to Condé. She proposed the Triumvirate would be deprived of office, without need for the Huguenots to disarm, and that the crown's forces would remain under the exclusive control of Condé's brother, Antoine of Navarre. Condé was not however satisfied with these terms, and counter proposed the idea of complete religious freedom being adopted, before he would disarm. Unable or unwilling to agree to this Catherine recalled the two Marshals from the city.

=== First siege ===
The royal army, having initially been caught off balance in the initial Huguenot surge, was by June ready to go on the offensive with its main body of 16,000 men. It was faced with a dilemma, due to the crown’s inability to fund more troops and field a second army. Should the force strike straight at the heart of the rebellion in Orléans, or clear the area around Paris first. The military decided on a dual approach, with the main body marching on Orléans, intending to pin the rebel army into the city, while provincial commanders who had raised their own forces independently of the crown, would clear the area around Paris. Condé, conscious that the large amount of cavalry he had at his disposal would only hinder his efforts of resisting a siege, instead decided to disperse his forces, scattering his army across northern France.

With Paris no longer threatened by a massed army and Blois recently retaken, the crown was left with new options for how to proceed. Flying columns were sent out under Louis, Duke of Montpensier and Jacques d'Albon, Seigneur de Saint André to recapture various smaller Huguenot seized territories, while a body under Claude, Duke of Aumale invested Rouen. The royal army meanwhile, proceeded to Bourges, reducing it quickly by siege, leaving Orléans now cut off to the south and west.

With Orléans cut off, the army made the decision to put it under only a loose siege, blocking forces arrayed around it to keep the city isolated, whilst the main body of the royal army headed to Rouen, where Aumale had been failing to reduce the city with his small force. This was not without dispute, Navarre having advocated besieging Orléans first, however he was overruled by the information that Orléans was experiencing a plague. Further there was still hope he could come to a compact with his brother Condé saving valuable resources that would be lost in a dedicated siege.

=== Blocking force ===
Despite their numerical inferiority, the rebels had not been dormant, and a detachment of several thousand mercenaries from the Holy Roman Empire had been recruited under François de Coligny d'Andelot, who now in October, re-entered the country at their head. The royal army, tied down besieging Rouen, was frustrated by this development, and instructed Saint André to intercept them, using the screening forces around Orléans to block their connection with the main rebel headquarters. He proved incapable however of accomplishing this, and Andelot arrived with the mercenaries at Orléans in early November, the city no longer besieged even loosely.

With these troops in hand, Condé could now plot a more forward strategy, and in November, he re-constituted the rebel army in full in the city for a quick push on Paris, rapidly advancing out of Orléans. His drive on Paris would however be frustrated, and as the royal army once more numerically superior drove him away from the city, he was forced to battle at the town of Dreux.

=== Dreux and its aftermath ===
==== Rebels ====
After the pyrrhic loss at the town of Dreux the remnants of Condé's army, now under the command of Gaspard II de Coligny whilst he was captive, fled south, the cavalry managing to retreat into the city in good order with the captured Anne de Montmorency. Coligny would not however stay in Orléans long, departing on 1 February for a planned lunge into Normandy, leaving Andelot in charge of the city's defences. Coligny hoped he would be able to link up with the English, who had established a foothold at Le Havre, and there receive money that he could use to pay his mutinous troops. Andelot meanwhile was left to face the duke of Guise, who arrived to invest the town on 5 February.

==== Crown ====
With the battle of Dreux, the crown lost two of its remaining three key commanders, with Saint-André dead, and Montmorency captive. This left Guise in total control of the crown's war effort, and whilst the queen mother, Condé and Montmorency pushed for a negotiated settlement, he sought a final triumphant victory at Orléans. In recognition of his uncontested supremacy of the military, he was made Lieutenant General of the kingdom, a post formally occupied by the deceased Navarre, three days after the battle. He could not however give pursuit to the rebels immediately, the crown's army having been badly mauled in the battle. When he headed south in January he encountered reconstituted forces under Coligny, and he was repulsed. Not dissuaded, he continued his march south, raising new captains and troops as he went. He captured Étampes restoring the connection between Blois and Paris before crossing the Loire near Orléans at Beaugency and arriving on the left bank of the city on 5 February.

== Siege ==
=== Forces involved ===
==== Guise ====
When Guise arrived on the left bank of the city, it was with gendarme companies, totaling around 10,000 men, alongside various other units. He did not however arrive with artillery, it having been delayed en route by bad weather. Further bad news came for the duke with news of the destruction of the powder factory in Paris in late January, thus the artillery, when it did arrive, was forced to source their powder from the Spanish Flanders. The crown's tight finances had left his units in a poor state, forced to live off the land, lodging in the homes belonging to nearby villagers, and having to forage many kilometers away for supplies. By March the queen mother would be pleading with Cossé to send 400,000 livres to meet the army's needs at Orléans, bemoaning that the soldiers were in 'great want'.

==== Orléans ====
Despite the lack of reputation for fortifications at Orléans, those in the city had not been idle during the civil war. The suburb of Portoreau had been provided with fortifications during the previous summer. To this end two bastions had been constructed at the entrance to the suburb, which controlled the critical bridge towards the main city. The bridge itself was protected by further towers called the 'Tourelles' with a final protective zone on the island half way down the bridge.

=== Capture of Portereau ===
An energetic commander, Guise set about seizing the critical suburb of Portereau that blocked his way to the city. His forces made a feint, towards attacking the bastion controlled by Gascon defenders, before changing course, and suddenly striking at the other bastion controlled by German landsknecht catching the defenders there totally by surprise, the walls were quickly scaled. Not wanting to let the victory go to waste, the besiegers pursued the routing defenders, as they fled back to the safety of the town walls along the bridge, however Guise did not yet have the strength to seize the city, and was beaten back in this attempt.

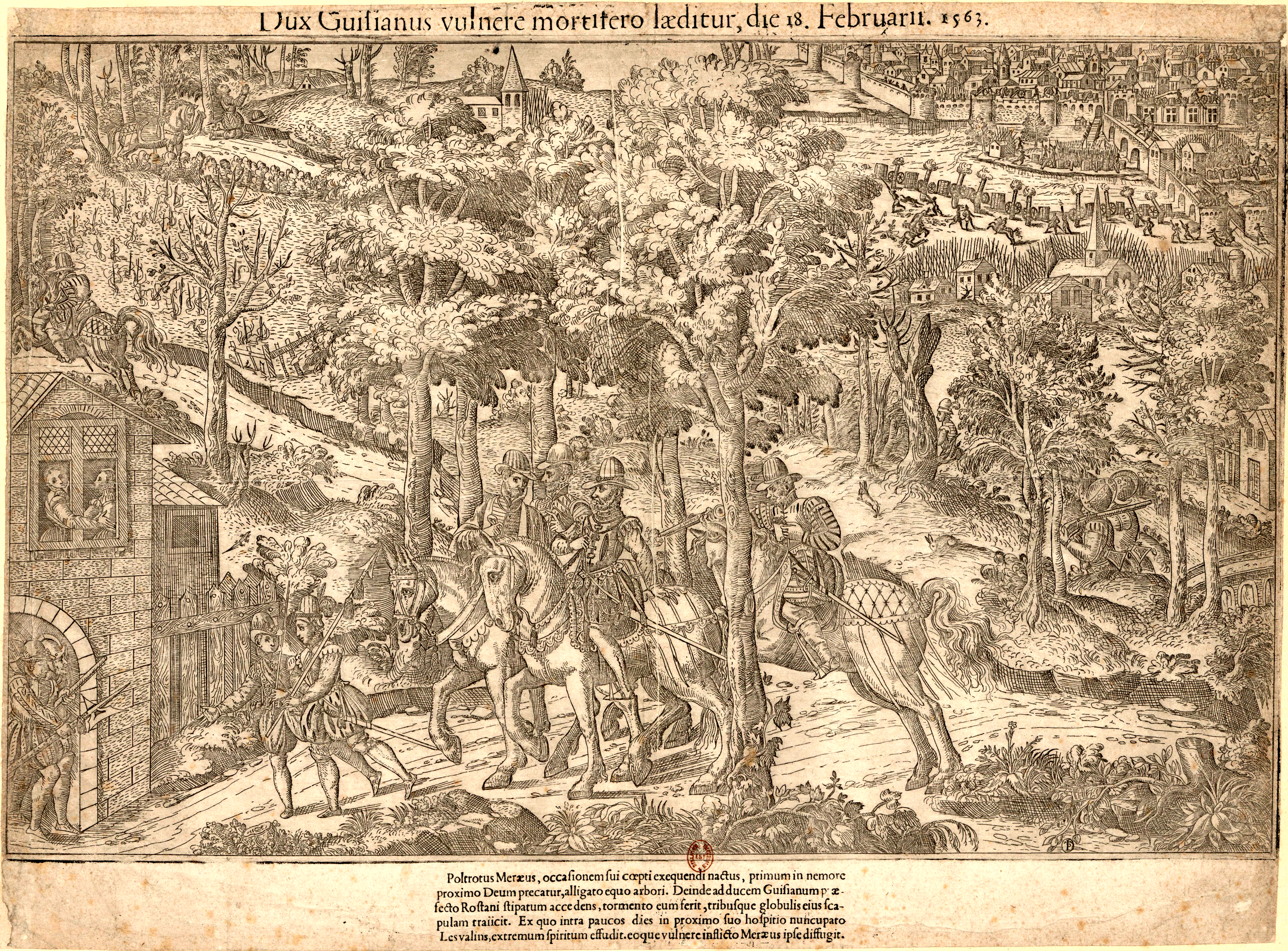
Engraving of the assassination of François, Duke of Guise by Jean de Poltrot. Illustrated by Jacque Tortorel and Jean Perrissin.

Several days after the capture of the bastions, Guise oversaw the capture of the Tourelles, all that was left ahead of him now was to seize the island on the bridge, and then he would be able to place his cannons close enough that he could pound the city into submission. The besieged defenders, getting increasing frantic, took to repurposing the brass of church bells and other ornaments into makeshift cannonballs, which produced a fearsome effect.

Guise attempted first to fill the river with bags of sand, so that the island might be walkable, however, the fierceness of the river in the season made this impractical, so he decided instead to divert the river to achieve his goals.

=== Assassination of the duke of Guise ===
With the cannons now close enough, Guise was able to breach the city walls in several places, potentially bringing him close to victory in the siege. On 18 February he wrote to the queen mother, assuring her victory was close at hand and the city would fall within the next 24 hours. The duke was returning to his lodgings from the suburb for the evening, on his way he had to cross a small stream, and the ferry had limited capacity, meaning that by the time he got close to his tent, he was almost alone. Jean de Poltrot who had pretended to defect to the duke's camp some days previously hid in the bushes along his route, and fired 3 shots at close range into the duke's back before fleeing. He would however get lost in the night and be unable to escape the sector, confessing his guilt when captured by some soldiers patrolling. Although the duke would linger for another few days before dying on 24 February 1563, the siege ended with his death, the army no longer having a leader.

== Aftermath ==
=== Final Huguenot campaign of the war ===
Whilst Guise was investing the city, Coligny was achieving success in his campaigning in Normandy. Though his German troops had been ravaging the countryside to a mutinous degree, he was finally able to secure 8000 crowns from his nominal English allies. This in hand, and his troops paid, he was able to have quick successes in the region, the only crown forces of the area tied down besieging Le Havre. On 1 March he opened fire on the town of Caen defended inside by René, Marquis of Elbeuf who had little choice but to surrender the town the next day. Bayeux subsequently capitulated to Coligny, furthering his consolidation of the northern region.

=== Peace agreed ===
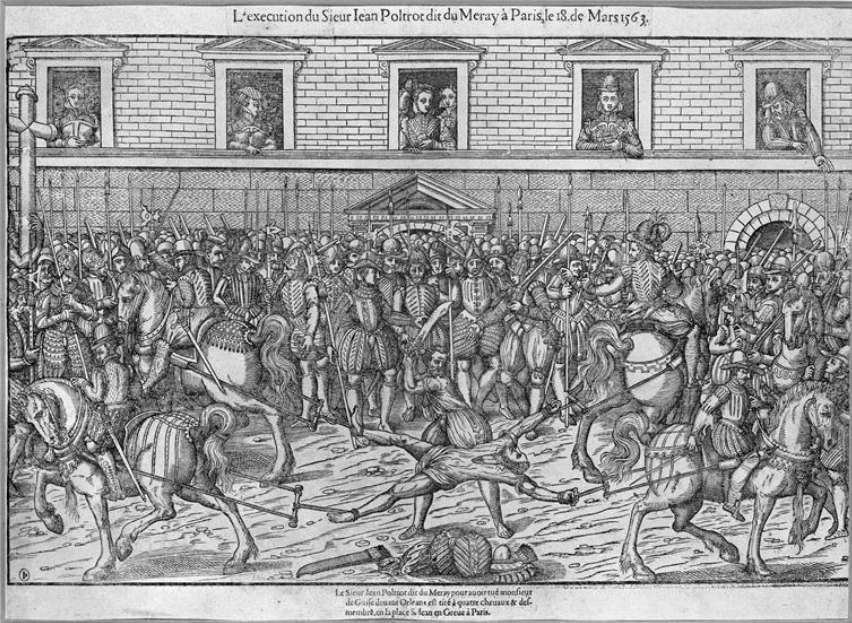
The execution of Guise's assassin

The combination of the revival of Huguenot fortunes in the Norman campaign, with the crumbling of authority once more in the south west of France around La Rochelle and Guyenne which had earlier been subdued by the seigneur de Montluc and the death of the duke of Guise pushed the crown towards seeking a negotiated settlement. Further imperative towards peace came from the collapsing finances of the state, struggling to support the mercenaries it had been forced to raise for this long. As such the queen mother oversaw the release of Conde and Montmorency from their respective custodies on 8 March. They met the same day on the Île aux Bœufs to discuss peace, and, having established satisfactory terms between them the Edict of Amboise received the royal assent on 19 March.

=== Bloodfeud ===
Under torture, Poltrot would implicate Coligny in his plot to assassinate the duke of Guise. From Normandy Coligny would protest strongly on 12 March, asserting that he had hired Poltrot merely as a spy to investigate the duke's camp, and that the murder plot was thus clearly his initiative. Poltrot would alter his confession, again under torture on 18 March claiming instead Jean de Parthenay-L'archêveque was the mastermind behind the operation. Poltrot would be executed in Paris before a large crowd on 18 March, the day before the amnesty in the Edict of Amboise for crimes committed during the war came into effect. Whilst on his deathbed Guise had urged forgiveness for his assassin, his family had other ideas, seizing on the idea that Coligny was the organiser. Montmorency took his nephew under his protection, making the dispute that of the two houses. The Montmorency would gain the upper hand initially, getting the investigation into Coligny suspended in 1564. However, in 1572 Henry I, Duke of Guise, would oversee the murder of Coligny during the opening hours of the St. Bartholomew's Day massacre.
