= Jean de Poltrot =

French Huguenot nobleman (died 1563)

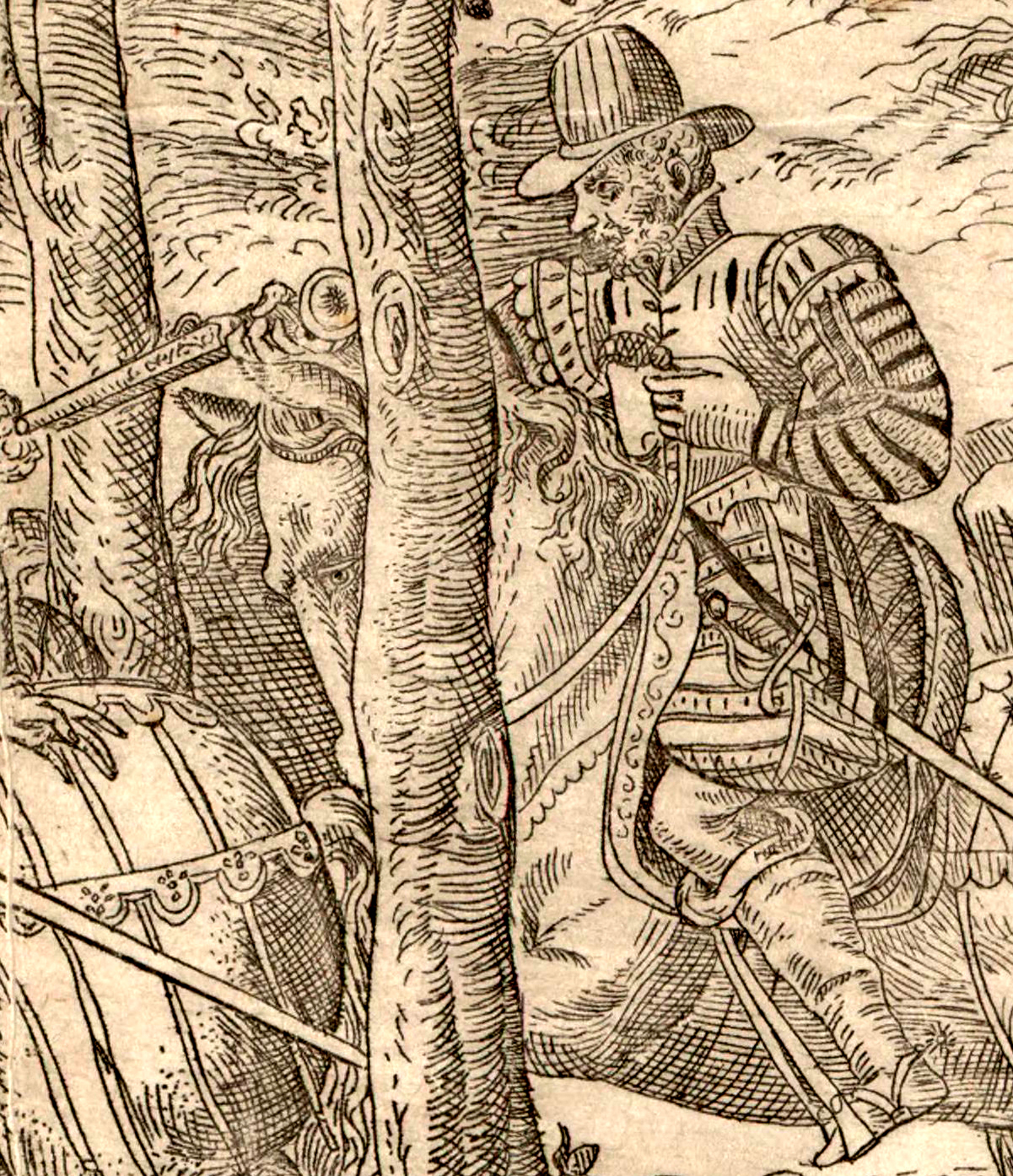

Jean de Poltrot (c. 1537 – 1563), sieur de Méré or Mérey, was a French nobleman of Angoumois, who assassinated Francis, Duke of Guise in the aftermath of the massacre of Huguenots at Wassy.

He had lived some time in Spain, and his knowledge of Spanish, together with his swarthy complexion, which earned him the nickname of the Espagnolet, procured him employment as a spy in the wars against Spain.

Having been converted to the Huguenot cause, he determined to kill Francis, Duke of Guise. Pretending to be a deserter, he gained admission to the camp of the Catholic army that was besieging Orléans. In the evening of 18 February 1563, he hid by the side of a road along which he knew the Duke would pass, fired a pistol at him, and fled. He was captured the next day, and following torture and a trial, he was sentenced to be drawn and quartered. The punishment, carried out on 18 March 1563, was botched; the horses having failed to rend his limbs, swords were used to finish the job.

Under torture, he had made several contradictory statements, some of which implicated Admiral Coligny. Coligny protested emphatically against the accusation, but nevertheless the assassination led to a vendetta between Coligny and Francis's sons, Henry and Louis. This vendetta not only prolonged the Wars of Religion but contributed to the attempted assassination of Coligny during the celebrations of the marriage of Henri of Navarre with Margaret of Valois, and thence to the St Bartholomew's Day massacre.

== In literature ==
De Poltrot's assassination of Duke Francis and his subsequent trial and execution are described in Ken Follett's historical novel, A Column of Fire.
