= Second Schmalkaldic War =

Uprising of German Protestant princes against Charles V

Second Schmalkaldic War Princes' Revolt
- Part of the European wars of religion and the Protestant Reformation
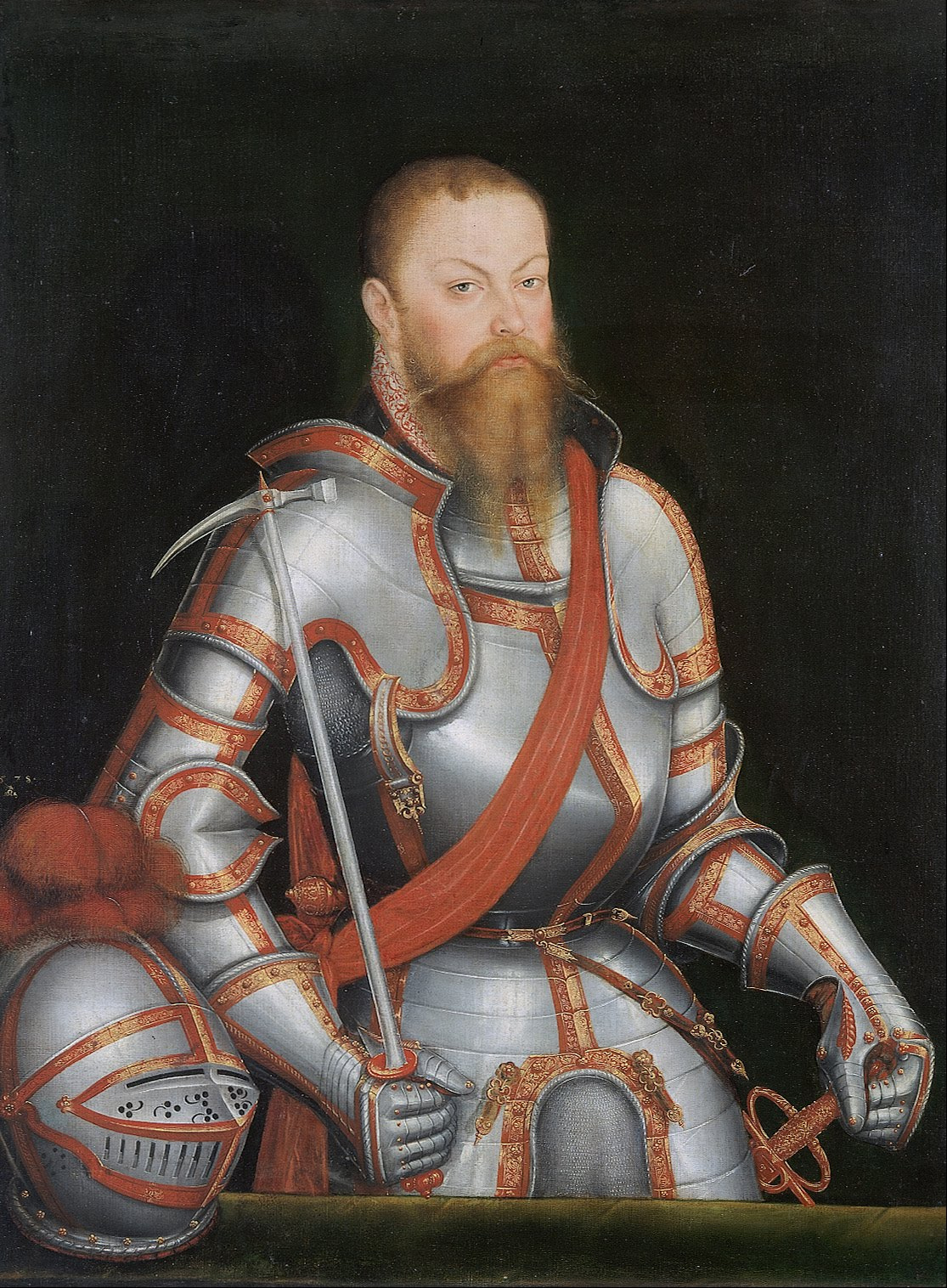
- Lucas Cranach jr.: Maurice of Saxony in armour (1578).
Date	March–August 1552
Location	German-speaking parts of the Holy Roman Empire, mainly southern Germany, Lorraine, and Austria
Result	Protestant victory: Peace of Passau (1552); Peace of Augsburg (1555)
Territorial changes	The Three Bishoprics annexed by the Kingdom of France

Belligerents
Electoral Saxony; Hesse; Prussia; Brandenburg-Kulmbach; Supported by: France	Holy Roman Empire: (Habsburg monarchy) Austria

Commanders and leaders
Maurice; William IV; Albert; Albert Alcibiades	Charles V

The Second Schmalkaldic War, also known as the Princes' Revolt (German: Fürstenaufstand, Fürstenkrieg or Fürstenverschwörung), was an uprising of German Protestant princes led by elector Maurice of Saxony against the Catholic emperor Charles V that broke out in 1552. Historians disagree whether the war concluded the same year with the Peace of Passau in August, or dragged on until the Peace of Augsburg in September 1555. The Protestant princes were supported by King Henry II of France, who was a Catholic, but sought to use the opportunity to expand his territory in modern-day Lorraine.

The war can be regarded as a continuation of the First Schmalkaldic War (1546–1547), in which Charles V and Maurice of Saxony jointly defeated the Schmalkaldic League of almost the same Protestant German princes. This previous conflict was settled by the Augsburg Interim, which left both camps unsatisfied, especially the princes who were forced to reconvert themselves and their population to Catholicism, although winning some concessions.

== Background ==
Discontent was growing in the Holy Roman Empire over the decisions made at the 1548 Augsburg Diet, the so-called Geharnischter Reichstag ("armour-clad Diet"). In the north, the Protestant princes secretly formed an alliance by the Treaty of Torgau of 22 May 1551. They included inter alia John Albert of Mecklenburg, Albert of Prussia, William of Hesse-Kassel, and Albert Alcibiades of Brandenburg-Kulmbach. They sought to defend Protestantism and the "Teutonic Liberty" (teutsche Libertät), which meant the freedom of the Imperial Princes. They also planned to liberate Philip of Hesse, who was incarcerated by the emperor in 1547. After laying the first contacts with Henry II, France declared war on the emperor in the autumn of 1551, and invaded Germany up to the Rhine. Furthermore, in the Treaty of Chambord 15 January 1552, France promised financial and military aid to the princes, for which they were prepared to relinquish the Three Bishoprics of Metz, Verdun, and Toul, near the border, to the French king.

== The war ==
A key role was played by the Saxon elector, Maurice (German: Moritz). Magdeburg, which had refused to obey the Augsburg Interim, was to be punished. Acting on the emperor's orders, Maurice marched at the head of an army against Magdeburg, but allied himself with the city and the emperor's opponents instead. The French king had already occupied the west bank of the Upper Rhine Plain in autumn 1551. The troops of the allied princes quickly conquered the southern German cities that had remained loyal to the emperor, and advanced into Tyrol in March 1552. The Catholic Imperial Estates stressed they were neutral in this conflict, because it was not in their interest to increase the emperor's power. The emperor barely escaped capture in Innsbruck and fled to Villach to rally new troops. Meanwhile, his brother Ferdinand was negotiating with Maurice and the other Protestant princes.

== Consequences ==
In Passau, both parties signed a peace agreement in August 1552. The insurgent princes gave up their alliance with France, and the Imperial forces released their prisoners. In the question of religion, they attempted to formulate a compromise, which would form the basis of the Religious Peace of Augsburg of 1555.
