= Bishopric of Metz =

Bishopric of Metz may refer to:

- Roman Catholic Diocese of Metz, the spiritual jurisdiction of the bishops of Metz
- Prince-Bishopric of Metz, the secular jurisdiction of the bishops of Metz in the Holy Roman Empire

== See also ==
- List of bishops of Metz
