= Battle of Renty =

1554 Habsburg-Valois conflict

- Part of the Habsburg-Valois War
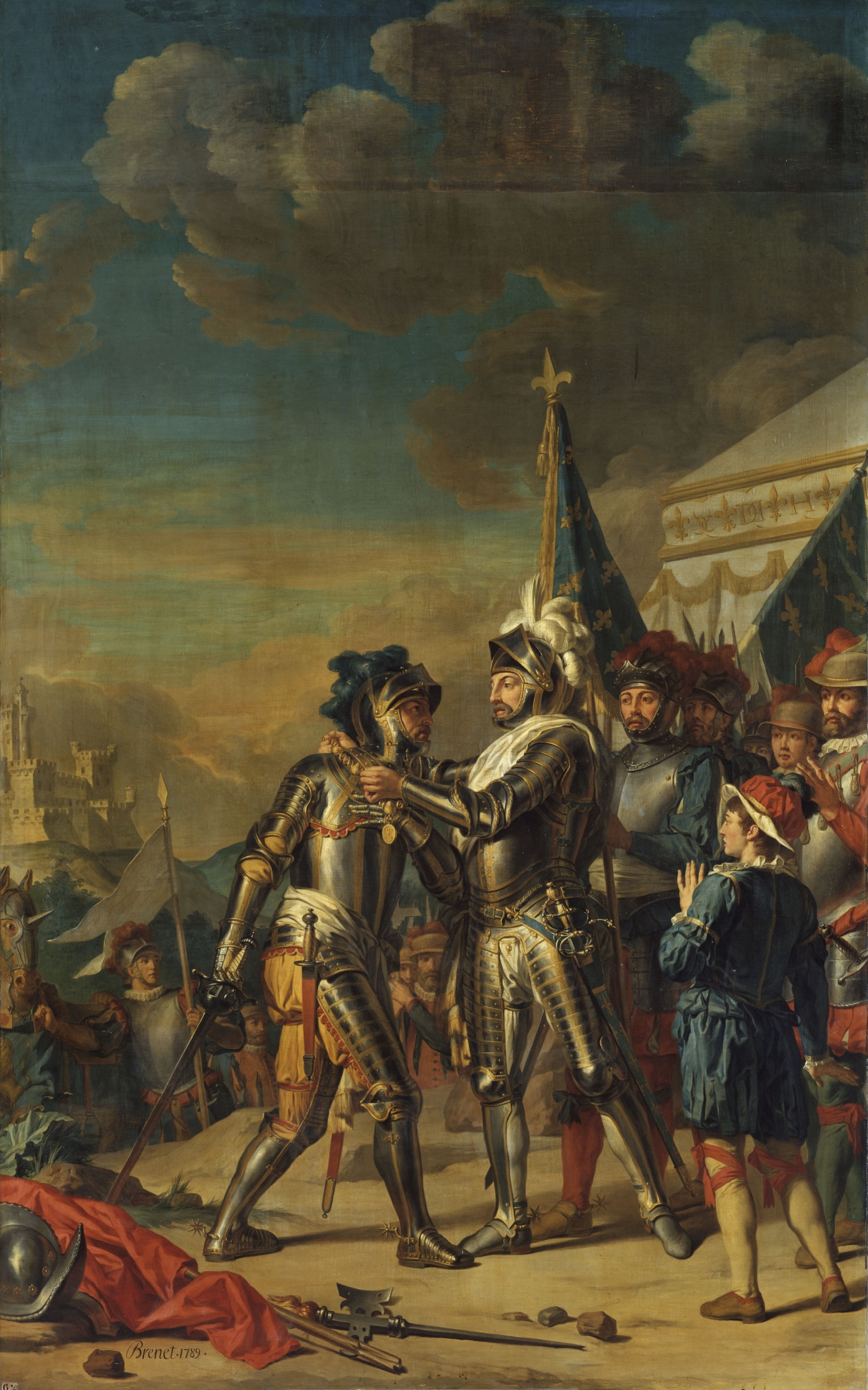
- Henry II remitting the Order of Saint-Michel to Marshall de Tavannes after the Battle of Renty, on 13 August 1554.
Date	12 August 1554
Location	Renty, France
Result	French victory

Belligerents
Holy Roman Empire	France

Commanders and leaders
(Holy Roman Empire) Charles V of Habsburg	(Kingdom of France) Francis, Duke of Guise

Strength
30,000	30,000

Casualties and losses
2,000	240

The Battle of Renty was fought on 13 August 1554, between France and the Holy Roman Empire at Renty, in the northern theatre of the Italian Wars. French commander Francis, Duke of Guise, had already forced the emperor to abandon the Siege of Metz in 1552. King Henry II of France had occupied the city according to the terms of the Treaty of Chambord he had signed with several Protestant Imperial princes.

The French were led by Francis, Duke of Guise, while the Imperial forces were led by Emperor Charles V of Habsburg. About 30,000 men took part on both sides.

== Battle ==
Renty, a small village with a solid castle, was in the hands of Spanish Imperial troops. Fighting began on 13 August when the French artillery began bombarding the castle. Initially the Emperor watched from prepared positions without acting, but eventually decided to intervene. The Imperial avant-guard attacked, and the two forces met at the foot of a hill. The Imperialist light cavalry, under the Duke of Savoy, and reiters commanded by Count Volrad de Schwartzemberg, chased French harquebusiers and their supporting gendarmes from the Bois Guillaume wood, a significant position.

Gaspard de Saulx, sieur de Tavannes, and the Duke of Guise, rallied the broken French troops and advanced.

Gaspard II de Coligny, Admiral of France, a Huguenot, dismounted and entered the Bois Guillaume wood with 1,000 men, attacking the Spanish defenders. After bitter fighting Coligny's men captured the wood. This allowed Gaspard de Saulx to charge the Imperialists, supported, possibly somewhat tardily, by Francis, Duke of Guise.

The French defeated the Imperialists and captured their artillery. The Imperial losses amounted to nearly 2,000 men.

Despite this victory, the French raised the siege two days later, on 15 August, because of a lack of ammunition. The French army pulled back to Compiègne, but advanced again, forcing the Emperor to flee.

King Henry II awarded Gaspard de Saulx his own Order of Saint-Michel on the battlefield.

== Aftermath ==
Charles V was forced to sign the Treaty of Vaucelles and abdicated two years later. King Henry II ultimately retained the Three Bishoprics of Metz, Toul, and Verdun.

However, the battle emphasised divisions between the French commanders. After the victory the Duke of Guise was in the King's quarters describing the victory to his colleagues when Coligny asked him where he had been. Guise took this as an insult, and though King Henry II managed to reconcile the two commanders, Guise never forgave Coligny (who was later murdered during the St. Bartholomew's Day Massacre). Meanwhile, Guise also later blamed the Constable, Anne de Montmorency, for not following up on the victory, claiming he did this to prevent his Guise faction gaining prestige and influence.

There is a commemorative plaque in the church at Renty.
