= Siege of Metz (1552) =

Siege during the Italian War of 1551–59

- Part of the Habsburg-Valois War
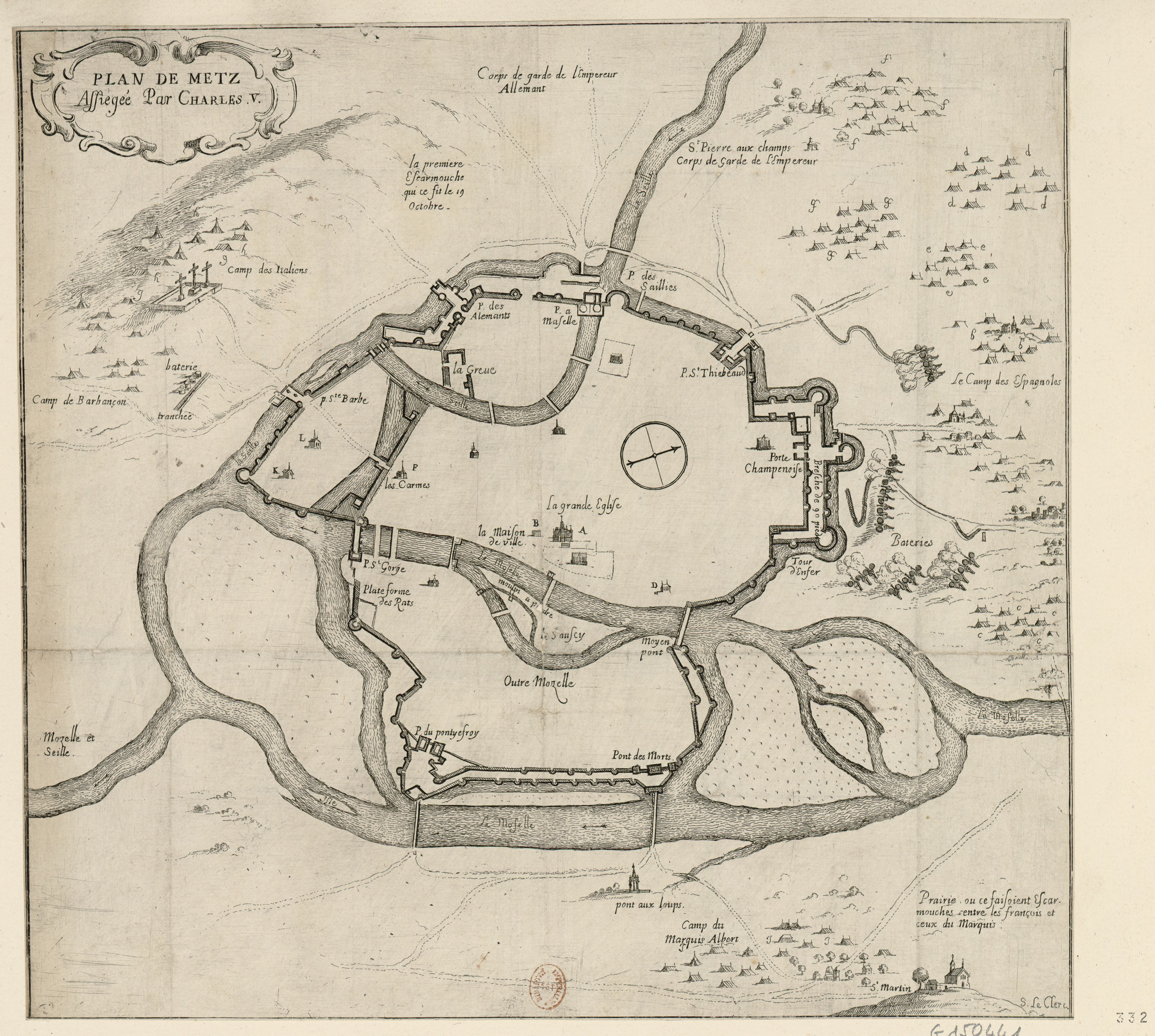
- Map of Metz during the siege
Date	19 October 1552 – 2 January 1553
Location	Metz, France
Result	French victory

Belligerents
Holy Roman Empire	Kingdom of France

Commanders and leaders
(Holy Roman Empire) Charles V of Habsburg	(Kingdom of France) Francis, Duke of Guise

Strength
20,000–60,000; 150 guns	6,000

Casualties and losses
20,000–30,000	Unknown

The siege of Metz during the Italian War of 1551–59 lasted from 19 October 1552 to 2 January 1553.

The so-called Augsburg Interim came to an end when Protestant princes of the Schmalkaldic League approached Henry II of France and concluded the Treaty of Chambord, giving the free cities of Toul, Verdun, and Metz (the 'Three Bishoprics') to the Kingdom of France. The Holy Roman Emperor Charles V laid siege to the French garrison commanded by Francis, Duke of Guise. Although cannonades destroyed large parts of the fortifications (see fr:Remparts médiévaux de Metz), the Imperial army was unable to take the city. Stricken by typhus, dysentery, and scurvy, Charles' army was forced to abandon the siege along with the sick and wounded. Metz remained a French protectorate (fr:République messine) until its annexation was formalized in 1648 by the Treaty of Westphalia.
