= Italian War of 1551–1559 =

Tenth phase of the Italian Wars

- Part of the Italian Wars and the French–Habsburg rivalry
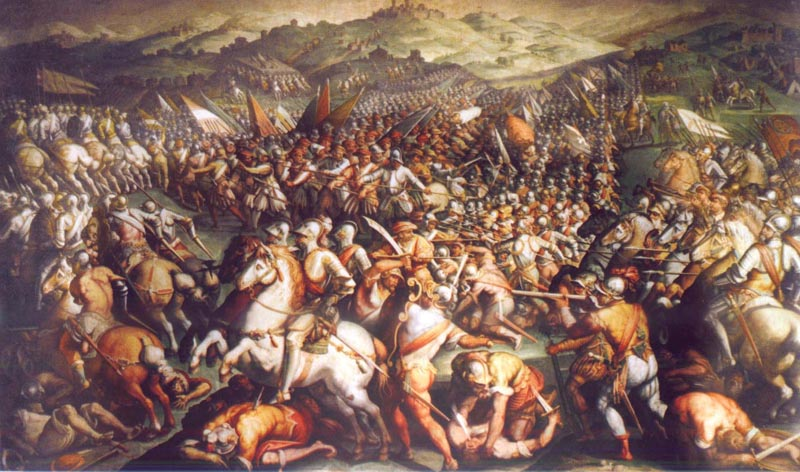
- The Battle of Scannagallo in 1554 by Giorgio Vasari, in the Palazzo Vecchio of Florence
Date	1551–1559
Location	France, Flanders, Italy and the Mediterranean
Result	Treaty of Cateau-Cambrésis (1559): Spanish and Imperial victory; Mixed results for France; English loss of Calais
Territorial changes	See § Territorial changes

Belligerents
Kingdom of France; (Old Swiss Confederacy) Swiss mercenaries; Ottoman Empire; Duchy of Parma (1551–1552); Republic of Siena (1552–1555/9); Papal States (1556–1557)	Holy Roman Empire; (Spain) Spanish Empire; Papal States (1551–1552); Duchy of Mantua; Kingdom of England (1557–1559); Duchy of Florence; Duchy of Savoy; Republic of Genoa; (Sovereign Military Order of Malta) Knights Hospitaller

Commanders and leaders
(Kingdom of France) Henry II; (Kingdom of France) Duke of Guise; (Kingdom of France) Duke of Montmorency; (Kingdom of France) Paul de Thermes; (Kingdom of France) Piero Strozzi; (Ottoman Empire) Suleiman I; (Ottoman Empire) Koca Sinan Pasha; (Ottoman Empire) Dragut; (Papal States) Pope Paul IV	(Holy Roman Empire) (Spain) Charles V/I; (Holy Roman Empire) Ferdinand I; (Holy Roman Empire) Ferrante I Gonzaga; (Holy Roman Empire) (Spain) William of Orange; (Papal States) Pope Julius III; (Spain) (Kingdom of England) Philip II; (Spain) Duke of Alba; (Spain) Count of Egmont; (Kingdom of England) Mary I; (Kingdom of England) Elizabeth I; (Kingdom of England) Baron Wentworth; Cosimo I de' Medici; Gian Giacomo Medici; (Duchy of Savoy) (Spain) Emmanuel Philibert of Savoy

The Italian War of 1551–1559 began when Henry II of France declared war against Charles V, Holy Roman Emperor, with the intent of recapturing parts of Italy and ensuring French, rather than Habsburg, domination of European affairs. The war ended following the signing of the Treaty of Cateau-Cambrésis between the monarchs of Spain, England and France in 1559. Historians have emphasized the importance of gunpowder technology, new styles of fortification to resist cannon fire, and the increased professionalization of the soldiers.

== Timeline ==
This is an overview of notable events including battles during the war.

Prelude (1547–1551)

- 10 September 1547: Pier Luigi Farnese, Duke of Parma, was assassinated, after which troops of Emperor Charles V occupied the Duchy of Parma.
- ? 1547: Ottavio Farnese, Pier Luigi's son, attacked but failed to regain Parma from the Imperial garrison commanded by Ferrante Gonzaga.
- 7 February 1550: The 1549–1550 papal conclave after Pope Paul III's death elected Pope Julius III, who immediately confirmed Ottavio Farnese's ownership of the Duchy of Parma. This angered Charles V, whose troops still occupied the duchy.
- June – 8 September 1550: Andrea Doria's Capture of Mahdia (1550) on behalf of Emperor Charles V.
- Late 1550: Henry II of France renewed the Franco-Ottoman alliance in response to the fall of Mahdia.
- 27 May 1551: Henry II of France and Ottavio Farnese, Duke of Parma signed a defensive alliance, placing Parma under French protection.

First phase (June 1551 – February 1556)

- June 1551: The War of Parma broke out between Charles V and Pope Julius III against Henry II of France and Ottavio Farnese.
- July 1551: Invasion of Gozo (1551). Ottoman victory over the Maltese Knights Hospitaller.
- 15 August 1551: Siege of Tripoli (1551). Ottomans captured Tripoli from Maltese Knights Hospitaller.
- July 1551 – March 1552: Siege of Mirandola (1551). Franco–Farnese victory over Imperial-Spanish-Papal army.
- 15 January 1552: Treaty of Chambord. Henry II of France allied himself with German Protestant princes against Charles V.
- 29 April 1552: A two-year truce ended the War of Parma.
- March–August 1552: Second Schmalkaldic War (or Princes' Revolt). The French-allied German Protestant princes defeated Charles V (Peace of Passau, 2 August), while Henry II annexed the Three Bishoprics to France.
- July 1552: Franco-Ottoman raid on Reggio and Calabria. Franco-Ottoman victory over Spain.
- 5 August 1552: Battle of Ponza (1552). Franco-Ottoman victory over Genoa (allied with Charles V).
- July 1552: Anti-Spanish revolt in Siena.
- 17 July 1552: Sienese rebels welcomed a French garrison to defend it against Spanish recapture attempts.
- 19 October 1552 – 2 January 1553: Siege of Metz (1552). French victory over Imperial army.
- January–February 1553: Spanish viceroy for Naples, Pedro de Toledo y Zúñiga, made a failed attempt to recapture Siena with Florentine assistance.
- 11 April – 20 June 1553: Siege of Thérouanne. Spanish-Imperial victory over France. The Imperials razed Thérouanne to the ground on the orders of Charles V in revenge for the defeat at Metz.
- 25 November 1553: Cosimo de' Medici, Duke of Florence, signed a secret treaty with Charles V to reconquer Siena for the Emperor.
- 1553–1559: Invasion of Corsica (1553). Ottomans & French temporarily occupied most of Corsica.
- 2 August 1554: Battle of Marciano or Scannagallo. Decisive Florentine-Spanish victory over Siena and France.
- 12 August 1554: Battle of Renty. French victory over Imperial army.
- January 1554 – 21 April 1555: Siege of Siena. Spanish victory over Siena and France. End of the Republic of Siena, which was annexed by the Duchy of Florence in 1559.
- June 1555: Failed peace Conference of Marck within the Pale of Calais.
- October 1555: Peace talks resumed.

Truce (February–September 1556)

- 5 February 1556: Truce of Vaucelles signed between Charles V and Henry II of France.
- Abdication of Charles V: Philip II had succeeded him as king of Spain and Lord of the Netherlands on 16 January 1556 and 25 October 1555, respectively; Ferdinand I had succeeded him as Holy Roman Emperor on 27 August 1556, although it would take some years for the Imperial Diet (3 May 1558) and the Pope (1559) to recognise Ferdinand as such.

Second phase (September 1556 – April 1559)

- 1 September 1556: Spanish invasion and occupation of the Papal States.
- September–December 1556: Attempts to limit the renewal of hostilities to the Papal States failed, and preparations for full-scale war were made.
- 6 January 1557: Gaspard II de Coligny, the French governor of Picardy, launched surprise attacks on Douai and Lens in the Spanish Netherlands, reopening the northern front.
- August 1557: Siege of Civitella. Spanish victory over France.
- 10–27 August 1557: Battle of St. Quentin (1557). Hispano-Savoyard-English victory over France.
- 12 September 1557: Spanish occupation of the Papal States. Pope Paul IV signed a separate peace treaty with the Duke of Alba (Spain).
- 1–8 January 1558: Siege of Calais (1558). French victory over England.
- 17 April – 23 June 1558: Siege of Thionville (1558). French victory over Imperial-Spanish army.
- July 1558: Raid of the Balearic Islands (1558). Ottoman victory over Spain.
- 13 July 1558: Battle of Gravelines (1558). Anglo-Spanish victory over France.
- 21 September 1558: Charles V died.
- 2 and 3 April 1559: Peace treaties of Cateau-Cambrésis.
- 10 July 1559: Henry II died of wounds of a jousting accident during the celebration of the Treaty of Cateau-Cambrésis.

== Operations ==
=== Mediterranean campaigns ===
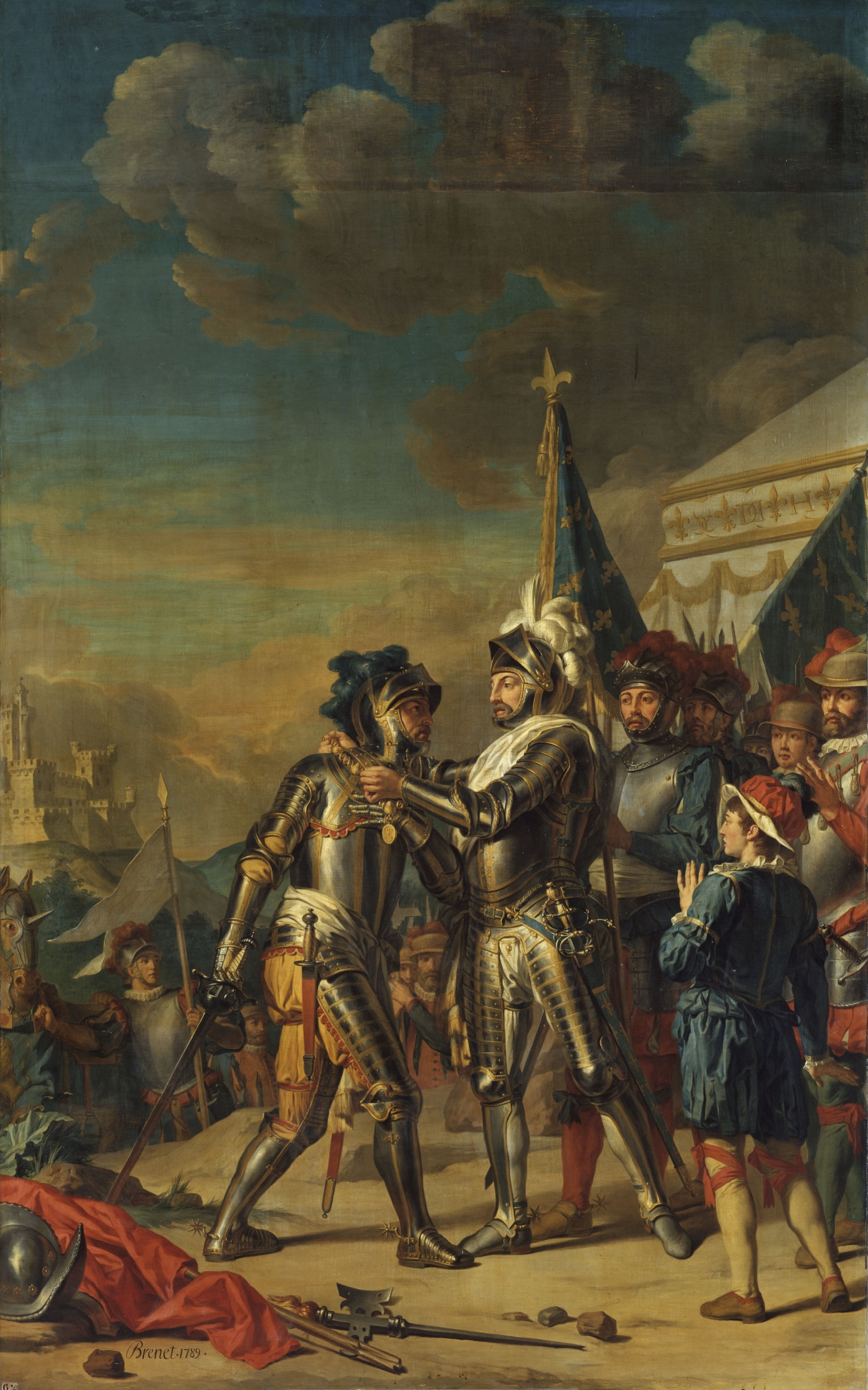
Henry II remitting the Order of Saint-Michel to Marshall de Tavannes after the Battle of Renty, on 13 August 1554

Henry II sealed a treaty with Suleiman the Magnificent in order to cooperate against the Habsburgs in the Mediterranean. This was triggered by the conquest of Mahdiya by the Genoese Admiral Andrea Doria on 8 September 1550, for the account of Charles V. The alliance allowed Henry II to push for French conquests towards the Rhine, while a Franco-Ottoman fleet defended southern France.

The 1551 Ottoman Siege of Tripoli was the first step of the all-out Italian War of 1551–59 in the European theater, and in the Mediterranean the French galleys of Marseille were ordered to join the Ottoman fleet. In 1552, when Henry II attacked Charles V, the Ottomans sent 100 galleys to the Western Mediterranean, which were accompanied by three French galleys under Gabriel de Luetz d'Aramon in their raids along the coast of Calabria in Southern Italy, capturing the city of Reggio. In the Battle of Ponza in front of the island of Ponza, the fleet met with 40 galleys of Andrea Doria, and managed to vanquish capture seven galleys from the Genoese. This alliance would also lead to the combined Invasion of Corsica in 1553.

In December 1557, after Paul IV signed peace with the Spanish, Henry requested Suleyman an attack of the Ottoman armada against the Spanish territories in Italy. However, by a miscoordination, the French failed to rendezvous with it, after which the Ottomans took a detour to invade the Balearic islands in 1558. In August of the same year, a new French request to be assisted in Provence and Corsica was formulated, but unheeded. The Ottomans continued harassing the Habsburg possessions with various operations in the Mediterranean.

=== Land campaigns ===
==== War of Parma ====
On the continental front, the opening phase of the war was marked by the Parmesan succession crisis: the newly elected Pope Julius III had confirmed Ottavio Farnese as the Duke of Parma and Piacenza, while Charles V's Imperial troops had occupied the city in 1547 after Ottavio's father's assassination. Seeing France as his best choice against the Emperor, Ottavio Farnese signed a defensive alliance with Henry II of France on 27 May 1551, placing Parma under French protection. Charles could not accept this, and pressured the Pope into an alliance against France and Parma, causing the War of Parma in June 1551. The main combat of this phase was the Siege of Mirandola (1551), during which the Franco-Farnese defenders repulsed attacks by the Papal-Imperial-Spanish forces. The belligerents agreed to a two-year truce on 29 April 1552, ratified by Charles V on 10 May, which ended the War of Parma.

==== Schmalkaldic War and Sienese siege ====
Meanwhile, Henry II allied with German Protestant princes against Charles V with the Treaty of Chambord on 15 January 1552. An early offensive into Lorraine, in the Second Schmalkaldic War, was successful, with Henry capturing the Three Bishoprics of Metz, Toul, and Verdun and securing them by defeating the invading Habsburg army at the Battle of Renty (12 August 1554). In 1552, an anti-Spanish revolt in the Republic of Siena gave Henry another ally; on 17 July 1552, a Franco-Sienese army managed to expel the Spanish garrison. The Sienese welcomed a French garrison to defend the Republic against Spanish recapture attempts. A French army invaded Tuscany in 1553 in support of the Sienese Republic. In January 1554, the Spanish started besieging the city of Siena. The French troops were attacked by an Imperial‐Florentine army and defeated at the Battle of Marciano by Gian Giacomo Medici (2 August 1554). After an 18-month-long siege, Siena fell to Spanish forces on 15 April 1555. Although a Republic of Siena reconstituted in Montalcino run by exiled Sienese loyalists continued to exist until 3 April 1559, the territory of the Republic of Siena was fully annexed to the Duchy of Florence under Cosimo I de' Medici with the Treaty of Cateau-Cambrésis (3 April 1559), and eventually became part of the Grand Duchy of Tuscany (1569).

==== Papal front and St. Quentin ====
A treaty in Vaucelles was signed on 5 February 1556 between Charles V and Henry II of France. After Emperor Charles' abdication in 1556 split the Habsburg empire between Philip II of Spain and Ferdinand I, the focus of the war shifted to Flanders. However, the truce was broken shortly afterwards. Pope Paul IV was displeased and urged Henry II to join the Papal States in an invasion of Spanish Naples. On 1 September 1556, Philip II responded by pre-emptively invading the Papal States with 12,000 men under the Duke of Alba. Alba and his subordinates seized and sacked numerous settlements while the pope waited for French reinforcements. French forces approaching from the north were defeated and forced to withdraw at the Siege of Civitella in August 1557. Philip, in conjunction with Emmanuel Philibert, Duke of Savoy, defeated the French in the Battle of St. Quentin (1557) (10–27 August). The Spanish attempted to blockade Rome by occupying the port of Ostia but were driven back by the Papal armies in a surprise attack. However, when French troops were unable to come to their aid, the Papal armies were left exposed and were defeated, with Spanish troops under the Duke of Alba arriving at the edge of Rome. Out of fear of another sack of Rome, Paul IV agreed to the Duke of Alba's demand for the Papal States to declare neutrality by signing the Peace of Cave-Palestrina (12 September 1557). Emperor Charles V criticized the peace agreement as being overly generous to the Pope.

==== English entry and Gravelines ====
A brief French-backed revolt led by Thomas Stafford against queen Mary I of England resulted in a three-day siege of Scarborough Castle in April 1557. Mary declared war on France in June 1557 and English troops assisted in the victory at St. Quentin in August. But England's entry into the war provoked the French Siege of Calais in January 1558, which was a defeat for the English. French armies plundered Spanish possessions in the Low Countries and emerged victorious in the Siege of Thionville (April–June 1558). Nonetheless, Henry lost gravely at the Battle of Gravelines (13 July 1558) and was forced to accept a peace agreement in which he renounced any further claims to Italy.

The wars ended for other reasons, including "the Double Default of 1557", when the Spanish Empire, followed quickly by the French, defaulted on its debts. In addition, Henry II had to confront a growing Protestant movement at home, which he hoped to crush.

=== Military technology ===
Oman (1937) argues that the inconclusive campaigns which generally lack a decisive engagement were largely due to ineffective leadership and lack of offensive spirit. He notes that mercenary troops were used too often and proved unreliable. Hale emphasizes the defensive strength of bastion forts newly designed at angles to dissipate cannon fire. Cavalry, which had traditionally used shock tactics to overawe the infantry, largely abandoned it and relied on pistol attacks by successive ranks of attackers. Hale notes the use of old-fashioned mass formations, which he attributes to lingering conservatism. Overall, Hale emphasizes new levels of tactical proficiency.

=== Finance ===
In 1552 Charles V had borrowed over 4 million ducats, with the Metz campaign alone costing 2.5 million ducats. Shipments of treasure from the Indies totalled over two million ducats between 1552 and 1553. By 1554, the cash deficit for the year was calculated to be over 4.3 million ducats, even after all tax receipts for the six ensuing years had been pledged and the proceeds spent in advance. Credit at this point began costing the crown 43 percent interest (largely financed by the Fugger and Welser banking families). By 1557 the crown was refusing payment from the Indies since even this was required for payment of the war effort (used in the offensive and Spanish victory at the battle of St. Quentin in August 1557).

French finances during the war were mainly financed by the increase in the taille tax, as well as indirect taxes like the gabelle and customs fees. The French monarchy also resorted to heavy borrowings during the war from financiers at rates of 10–16 percent interest. The taille was estimated in collection for 1551 at around six million livres.

During the 1550s, Spain had an estimated military manpower of around 150,000 soldiers, whereas France had an estimated manpower of 50,000.

== Treaty of Cateau-Cambrésis (1559) ==
=== Summary ===
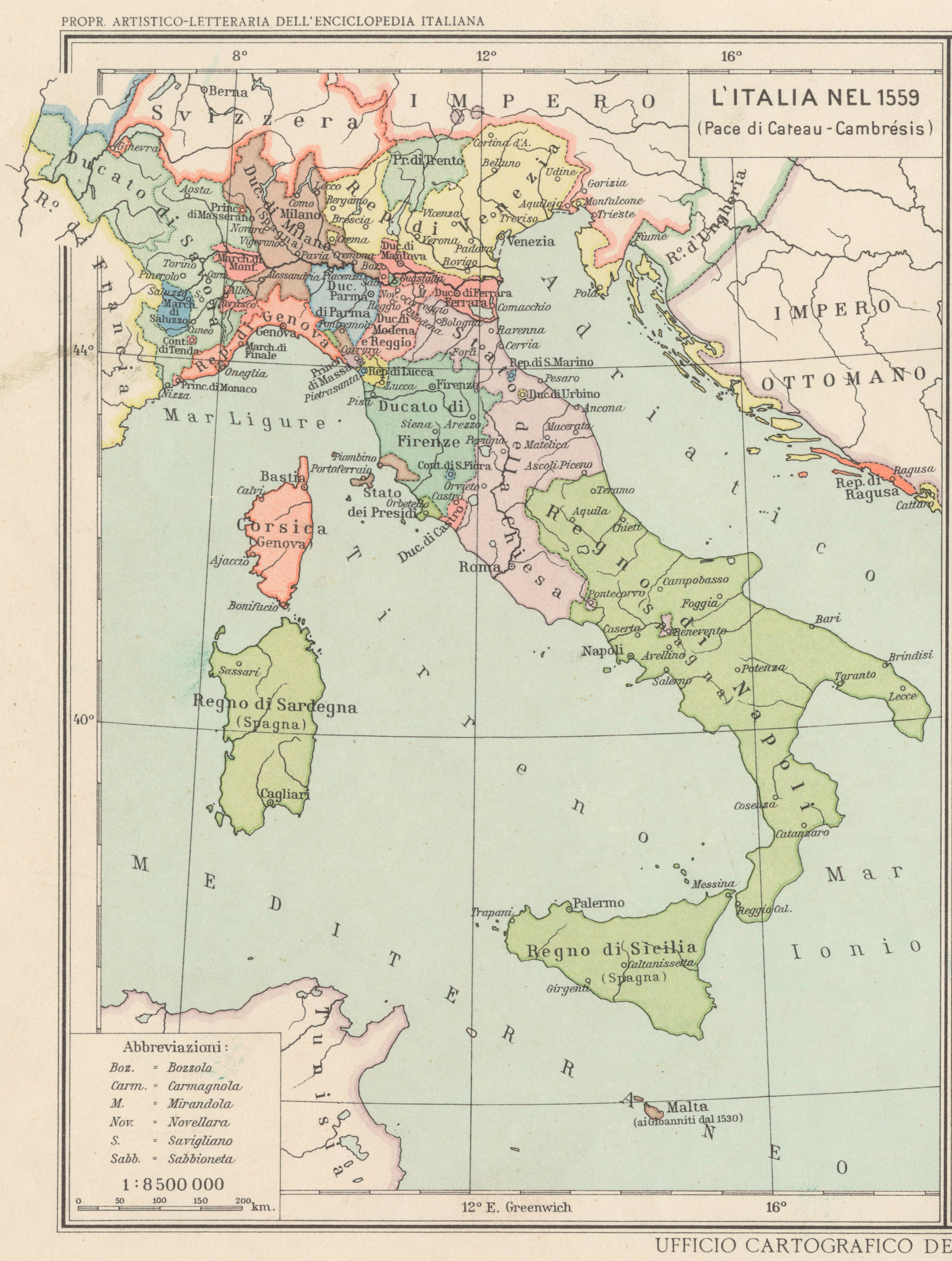
Italy after the Treaties of Cateau-Cambrésis

The Treaty of Cateau-Cambrésis (1559) consisted of two treaties: the first one was signed between Elizabeth I of England and Henry II of France on April 2; the second one was signed between Henry II of France and Philip II of Spain on April 3. The two treaties also defined the conclusion of the Imperial-French wars and therefore the end of the Habsburg-Valois conflict as a whole, with the approval of Ferdinand I, Holy Roman Emperor. (Note: The Holy Roman Empire was not an actual signatory of the treaties of Cateau-Cambrésis but ended Imperial conflict with France in Italy, which effectively allowed Emperor Ferdinand to change his foreign policy.) (Note: The Treaty of Cateau-Cambrésis was also presented at a Diet of German princes in Augsburg, with Imperial-French talks occurring on March 21, April 12, and April 26.) The four monarchs did not meet in person but were represented by ambassadors and delegations. Some Italian states also attended the conference - for instance, Ottavio Farnese, Duke of Parma sent the Mantuan Curzio Gonzaga as his delegate.

=== Franco-Spanish agreement ===
- Henry II of France recognised Philip II of Spain as ruler of Milan and Naples. Henry II of France renounced his hereditary claims to the Duchy of Milan (ruled by Spain and part of the Holy Roman Empire), and recognized Spanish control over the Kingdom of Naples, the Kingdom of Sicily, and the Kingdom of Sardinia.
- Henry and Philip agreed to bring about 'the convocation and celebration of a holy universal council, so necessary for the reformation and reduction of the whole Christian Church into a true unity and harmony'. (Article 2)
- Spain returned Saint Quentin, Ham, Le Catelet and other places in northern France taken during the war. (Article 11)
- Henry confirmed Charles V's 1536 transfer of the March of Montferrat to the Duchy of Mantua, ruled by Guglielmo Gonzaga (which allied with Spain and part of the Holy Roman Empire). (Articles 21–22)
- France returned the island of Corsica to the Republic of Genoa (allied with Spain and part of the Holy Roman Empire). French and Genoese merchants were granted full access to each other's ports. (Article 24)
- France recognised the 1555 conquest of the Republic of Siena (allied with France) by the Republic of Florence (allied with Spain and part of the Holy Roman Empire) and ceded the Presidi to Philip of Spain. (Article 25)
- As part of the terms, Emmanuel Philibert, Duke of Savoy married Henry's sister Margaret of France, Duchess of Berry (1523–1574), while his eldest daughter Elisabeth of Valois (1545–1568) became Philip's third wife. (Articles 26–33)
- France withdrew from Piedmont and gave the Duchy of Savoy–Piedmont (allied with Spain and part of the Holy Roman Empire) back to Emmanuel Philibert, Duke of Savoy due to his victory at St. Quentin. Emmanuel Philibert agreed to remain neutral in the event of future conflict. (Note: "...demourant au surplus led. sr de Savoye avecques ses terres, pays et subjectz, bon prince, neutre et amy commun desd. srs Roys Très Chrestien et Catholicque." (Article 39)) (Articles 33 to 43)
- France retained five fortresses in northern Italy: near Turin ("Thurin"), Cherasco ("Quiers"), Pinerolo (Pignerol, "Pinerol"), Chivasso ("Chivaz") and Villanova d'Asti ("Villeneufve d'Ast"). (Article 34)
- France retained the Three Bishoprics of Toul, Metz, and Verdun, ceded by Maurice, Elector of Saxony for Henry's support during the Second Schmalkaldic War in 1552. (Note: The Bishoprics remained part of the Holy Roman Empire until formally incorporated into France by the 1648 Peace of Westphalia) (Article 44)

=== Anglo-French agreement ===
- (Articles 7, 8 and 14) England granted France possession of the Pale of Calais (seized from England in 1558), for an initial period of eight years (Article 7). This was a mechanism to save face and although Elizabeth tried to take advantage of the civil war to negotiate its return in 1562, it remained French thereafter.

== Aftermath ==
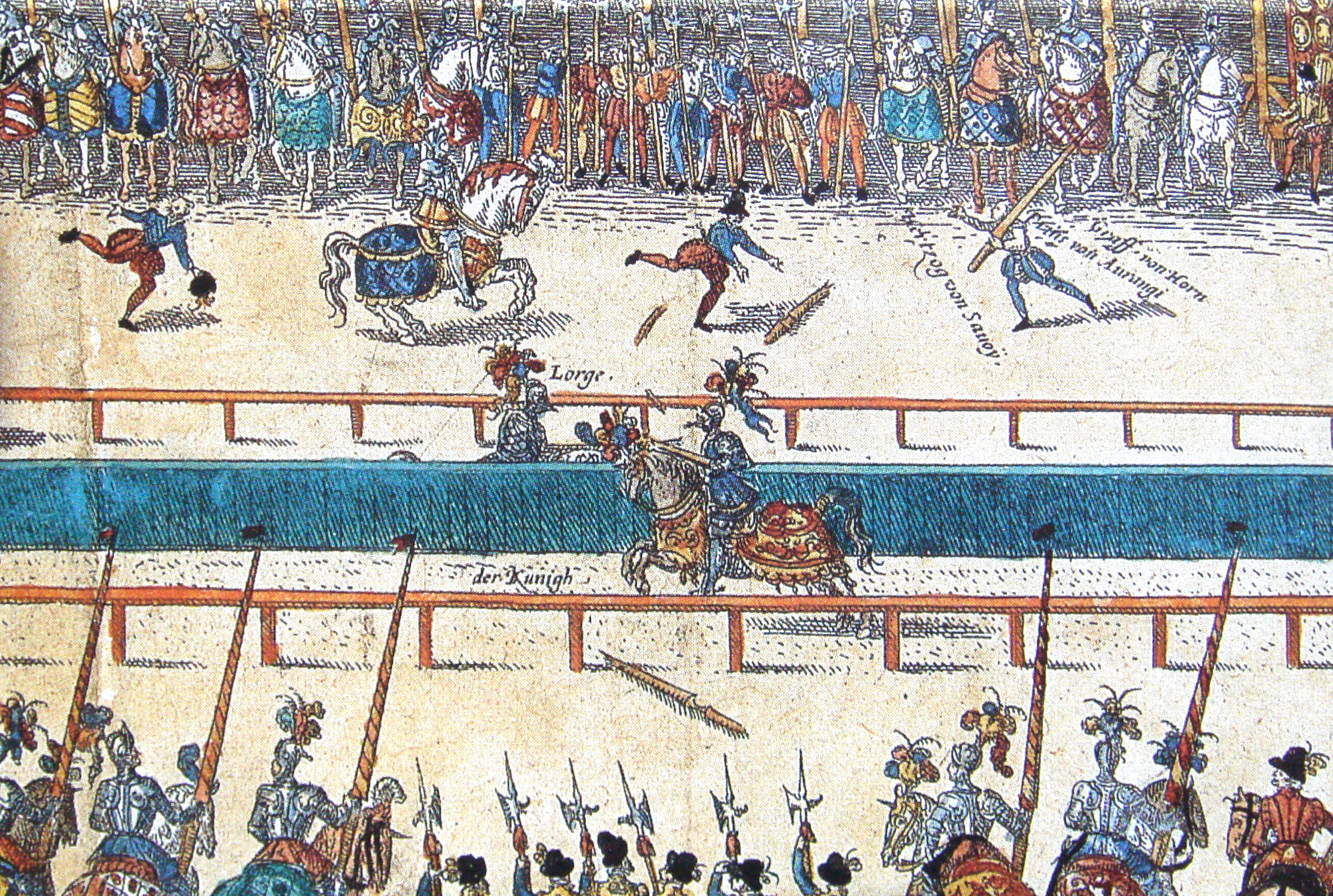
The fatal tournament between Henry II and Montgomery (Lord of "Lorges") while celebrating the end of the Italian wars

Emmanuel Philibert, Duke of Savoy married Margaret of France, Duchess of Berry, the sister of Henry II of France. Philip II of Spain married Elisabeth, the daughter of Henry II of France. During a tournament held to celebrate the peace on 1 July, king Henry was injured in a jousting accident when a sliver from the shattered lance of Gabriel Montgomery, captain of the Scottish Guard at the French Court, pierced his eye and entered his brain. He died ten days later on 10 July 1559. His 15-year-old son Francis II succeeded him before he too died in December 1560 and was replaced by his 10-year-old brother Charles. The resulting political instability, combined with the sudden demobilisation of thousands of largely unpaid troops, led to the outbreak of the French Wars of Religion in 1562 that would consume France for the next thirty years.

At the end of the wars, about half of Italy was ruled by the Spanish Habsburgs, including all of the south (Naples, Sicily, Sardinia) and the Duchy of Milan; the other half of Italy remained independent (although the north was largely formed by formal fiefs of the Austrian Habsburgs as part of the Holy Roman Empire). The most significant Italian power left was the papacy in central Italy, as it maintained major cultural and political influence during the Catholic Reformation. The Council of Trent, suspended during the war, was reconvened by the terms of the peace treaties and came to an end in 1563. Pope Pius V recognised Cosimo I de Medici as the Grand Duke of Tuscuny

After the War of the Spanish Succession, most of the Spanish possessions in Italy were acquired by Austria. Following the War of the Austrian succession, the Italian Hapsburg territories were divided between the new dynastic houses. The House of Hapsburg-Lorraine retained Milan for itself and Savoy as it feudal territory, while the Spanish Bourbons obtained Sicily & Naples, with a cadet branch taking over the Duchy of Parma.

== See also ==
- Elizabeth I of England
- Franco-Ottoman alliance
- States of Italy in 1559

== Bibliography ==
- Babel, Rainer (2021). "42. Der Frieden von Cateau-Cambrésis 1559". Handbuch Frieden im Europa der Frühen Neuzeit / Handbook of Peace in Early Modern Europe. pp. 857–876. doi:10.1515/9783110591316-042. ISBN 9783110591316. S2CID 234558650. doi:10.1515/9783110591316-042
- Baumgartner, Frederic J. Henry II, King of France 1547–1559 (Duke Univ Press, 1988).
- Braudel, Fernan (1949). The Mediterranean and the Mediterranean World in the Age of Philip II: Volume II (1995 ed.). University of California Press. ISBN 978-0520203082.
- Haan, Bertrand (2010). Une paix pour l'éternité. La négociation du traité du Cateau-Cambrésis. Madrid: Casa de Velázquez.
- Isom-Verhaaren, Christine (2011). Allies with the Infidel: The Ottoman and French Alliance in the Sixteenth Century. Bloomsbury Publishing. ISBN 9780857719737.
- Oman, Charles W. C. A History of the Art of War in the Sixteenth Century (1937).
- Pepper, Simon, and Nicholas Adams. Firearms & Fortifications: Military Architecture and Siege Warfare in Sixteenth-century Siena (University of Chicago Press, 1986).
- Romier, Lucien, Les guerres d'Henri II et le traité du Cateau-Cambrésis (1554–1559), in: MAH 30 (1910), p. 1–50.
- Setton, Kenneth M. (1976). The Papacy and the Levant (1204–1571). American Philosophical Society.
- Watkins, John (2018). "Peace of Cateau-Cambrésis (1559)". The Encyclopedia of Diplomacy. pp. 1–5. doi:10.1002/9781118885154.dipl0489
