= Renty =

Renty Renteke
- Commune
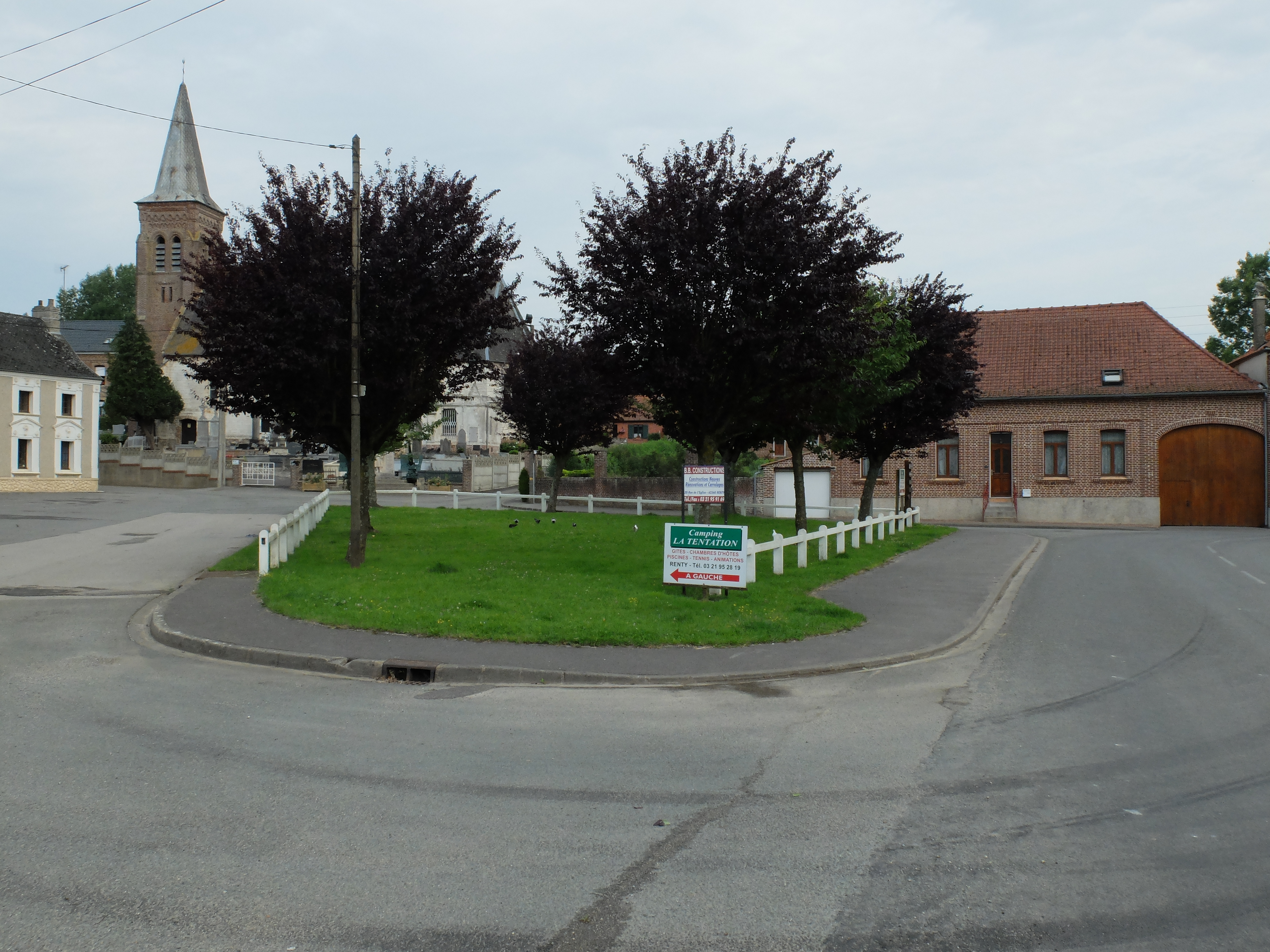
- The square of Renty

- Coat of arms
- Location of Renty
- Location within France Location within Hauts-de-France
- Coordinates: 50°35′02″N 2°04′25″E
- Country: France
- Region: Hauts-de-France
- Department: Pas-de-Calais
- Arrondissement: Saint-Omer
- Canton: Fruges
- Intercommunality: Pays de Saint-Omer

Government
  - Mayor (2020–2026): Jean-Marc Findinier
- Area^{1}: 15.67 km^{2} (6.05 sq mi)
- Elevation: 162 m (531 ft)
- Highest elevation: 186 m (610 ft)
- Lowest elevation: 77 m (253 ft)
- Population (2023): 596
  - Density: 38.0/km^{2} (98.5/sq mi)
- Time zone: UTC+01:00 (CET)
  - Summer (DST): UTC+02:00 (CEST)
- INSEE/Postal code: 62704 /62560
- ^{1} French Land Register data, which excludes lakes, ponds, glaciers > 1 km^{2} (0.386 sq mi or 247 acres) and river estuaries.

Renty (French pronunciation: [ʁɑ̃ti]; West Flemish: Renteke) is a commune in the Pas-de-Calais department in the Hauts-de-France region of France about 13 miles (21 km) southwest of Saint-Omer, by the banks of the river Aa. In 1554, the Battle of Renty was fought here between France and the Holy Roman Empire.

== Population ==
Historical population
Year	Pop.	±% p.a.
1968	484	—
1975	429	−1.71%
1982	448	+0.62%
1990	463	+0.41%
1999	439	−0.59%
2007	525	+2.26%
2012	615	+3.22%
2017	624	+0.29%
2023	596	−0.76%
Source: INSEE

== Transport ==
The Chemin de fer d'Anvin à Calais opened a railway station at Renty in 1881. The railway was closed in 1955.

== See also ==
- Communes of the Pas-de-Calais department
