= Siege of Mirandola (1551) =

1551 Unsuccessful papal siege of Mirandola

- Part of the Italian War of 1551–1559
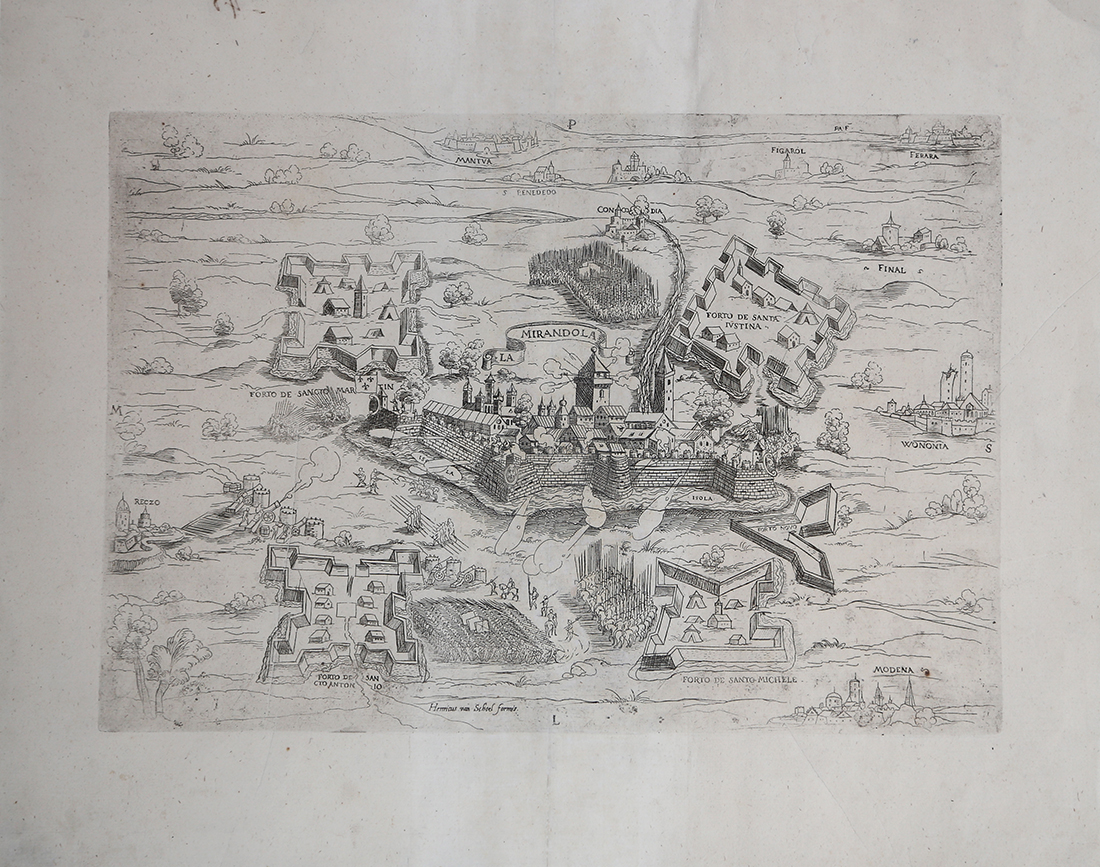
Date	July 1551 – March 1552
Location	Mirandola, Emilia, Italy
Result	French victory

Belligerents
Duchy of Mirandola; Kingdom of France	Papal States; Holy Roman Empire; Spanish Empire

Commanders and leaders
Ludovico Pico; Piero Strozzi	Camillo Orsini; Alessandro Vitelli; Giovanni Battista del Monte

Strength
400	4,000

Casualties and losses
c. 200	c. 1,800

The siege of Mirandola took part in 1551, carried on by Pope Julius III against the city, which had allied with France during the last of the Italian Wars.

As during the War of the League of Cambrai, the fortified city-state of Mirandola had again allied with France. Like his predecessor Julius II had made in 1511, Pope Julius III in 1551 sent against it an army under generals Camillo Orsini and Alessandro Vitelli, along with his nephew, Giovanni Battista del Monte, who later proved inept at military matters.

Despite the alliance with the Emperor Charles V and his imperial support, the siege dragged on for months due to rivalry between the papal commanders. Differently from the 1511 siege, the ditches did not get iced, and sallies from besieged knights hampered communications between the four forts built by the besiegers around the citadel.

In spring, the siege continued with no result, waiting for a corps of Landsknechts to be sent by Charles from Germany. However, in March 1552, a Mirandolese raid surprised the pope's nephew while hunting and killed him. The pope wrote to the emperor that he would abandon the siege.

== Sources ==
- Saltini, Antonio (2003). L'assedio della Mirandola . Edizioni Diabasis. ISBN 978-88-8103-280-8.
