= Three Bishoprics =

French occupied dioceses in the Kingdom of France

- Government of Kingdom of France
- 1552–1790
- Capital: Metz
- History
  - Established: 1552
  - Disestablished: 1790
Preceded by
Prince-Bishopric of Metz
Bishopric of Toul
Prince-Bishopric of Verdun
Succeeded by
Meurthe (department)
Meuse (department)
Moselle (department)

The Three Bishoprics (French: les Trois-Évêchés [le tʁwɑz‿eveʃe]) constituted a government of the Kingdom of France consisting of the dioceses of Metz, Verdun, and Toul within the Lorraine region. The three dioceses had been prince-bishoprics of the Holy Roman Empire until they were seized by King Henry II of France between April and June 1552. At the end of the Thirty Years' War, they were officially ceded to France by the 1648 Peace of Westphalia.

== History ==
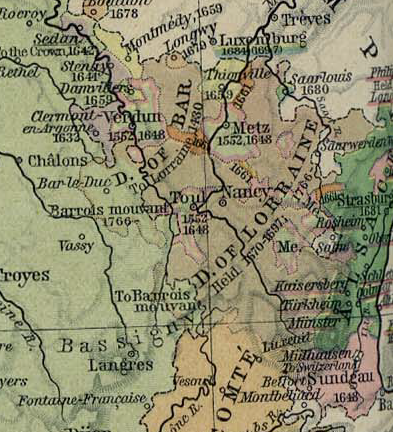
The Three Bishoprics of Metz, Toul and Verdun (outlined in pink), surrounded by the Duchies of Bar and Lorraine

In the course of the rebellion against the Habsburg emperor Charles V, several Protestant Imperial princes met at Lochau Castle near Torgau in May 1551. Here the receiving Wettin elector Maurice of Saxony forged an alliance with Duke John Albert I of Mecklenburg, Prince William IV of Hesse, whose father Landgrave Philip I was jailed by the emperor, the Hohenzollern margrave Albert Alcibiades of Brandenburg-Kulmbach and his cousin Duke Albert of Prussia.

Dissatisfied with the Interim decreed by Charles V at the 1548 Diet of Augsburg, the insurgents were full of resolution to defend Protestantism and–not least–their autonomy against the Imperial central authority. They agreed to establish contacts with the Catholic French king Henry II, disregarding his oppression of the Protestant Huguenots. In autumn Henry declared war against Charles V and prepared to march against the Empire up to the Rhine River. On 15 January 1552, he signed the Treaty of Chambord with Maurice of Saxony and his Protestant allies, whereby the French conquests were legitimised ahead of time. The princes acknowledged the king's lordship as "Vicar of the Empire" over the Imperial cities of Metz, Toul and Verdun, as well as Cambrai "and other towns of the Empire that do not speak German". The insurgents in turn received subsidies and military assistance from the French, their troops moved into the Habsburg hereditary lands and laid siege to the emperor at Innsbruck, while his brother Ferdinand I entered into negotiations that led to the revocation of the Augsburg Interim by the 1552 Peace of Passau.

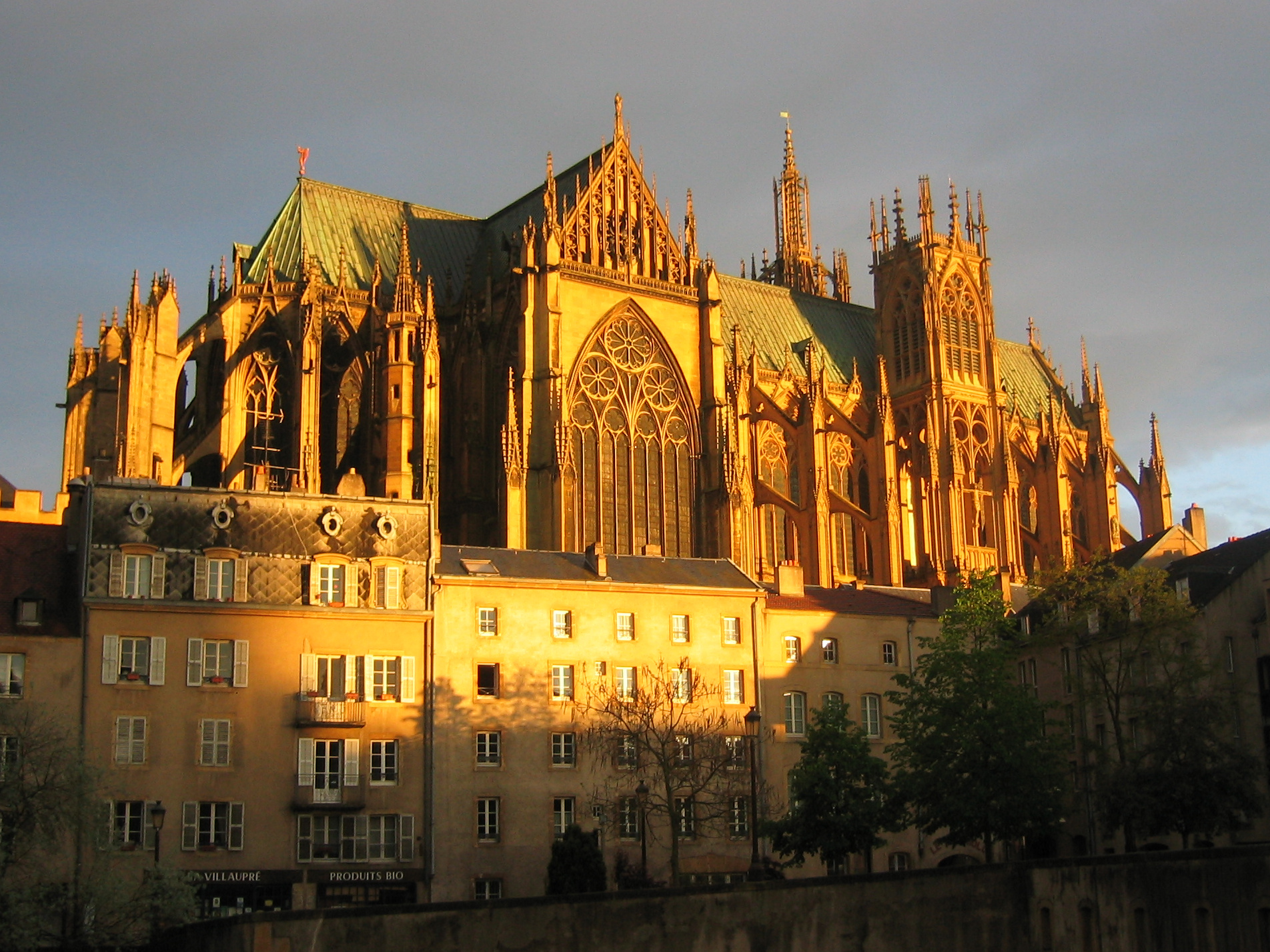
Metz Cathedral

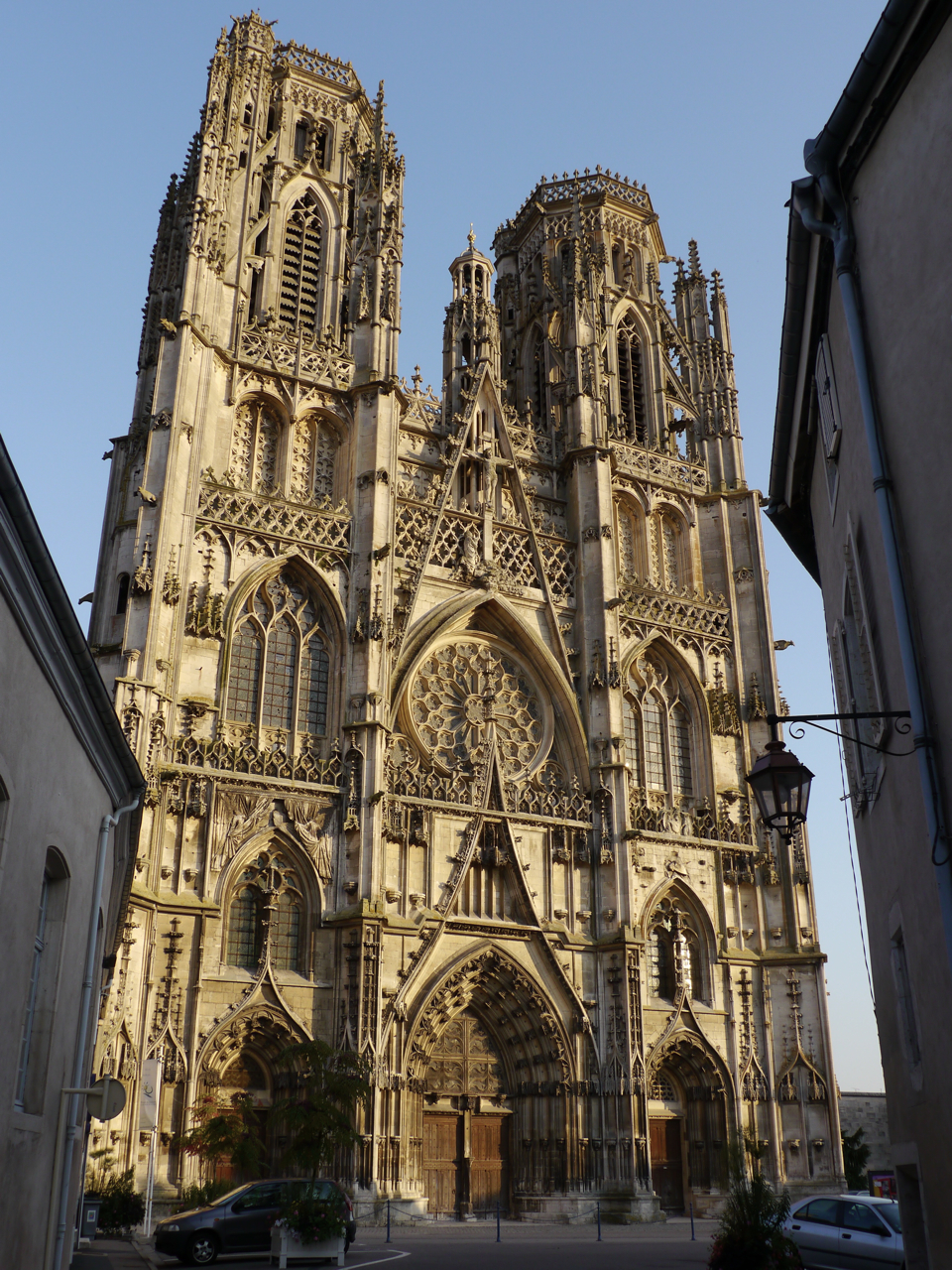
Toul Cathedral

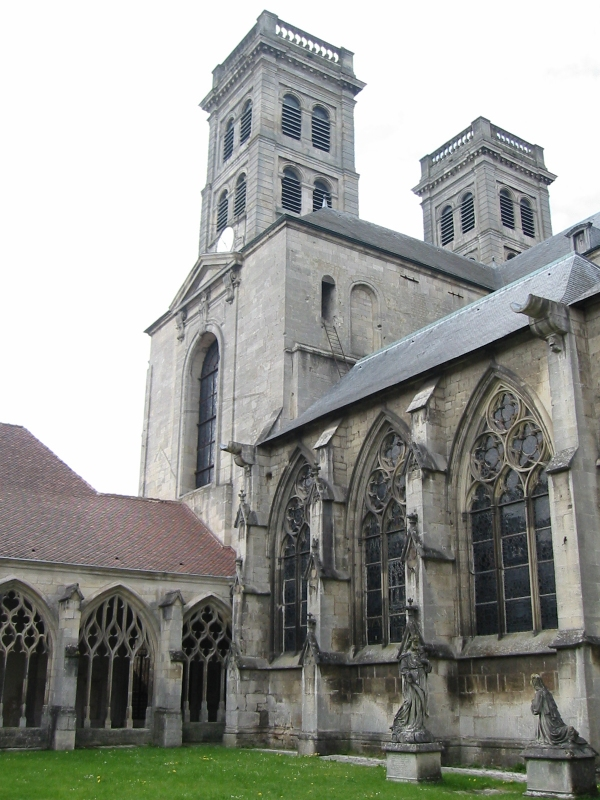
Verdun Cathedral

Backed by Duke Francis of Guise and his brother Cardinal Charles of Lorraine, King Henry II of France upon his agreement with the Protestant princes had started his Voyage d’Allemagne "for the sake of German liberties". On Palm Sunday 1552 French troops under the command of Anne de Montmorency in a surprise attack moved into the walls of Metz, followed by the occupation of Toul on 13 April. Henry then turned against the Lorraine capital Nancy, where he had the minor duke Charles III abducted to the French court in Paris. On 18 April the king celebrated his entry into Metz and, after a failed attack on the Imperial City of Strasbourg, returned from the Rhine to move into Verdun on 12 June. At that time, the French had occupied the three Imperial cities as well as the territory of the surrounding Prince-bishoprics.

From the emperor's perspective, Elector Maurice and his allies had no right to legally dispose of Imperial territory, Charles V started a campaign against the French in order to reconquer the occupied dioceses culminating in the Siege of Metz from 19 October 1552 to 2 January 1553. The expedition ultimately failed, when the Imperial troops were defeated by the French forces under Duke Francis of Guise in the 1554 Battle of Renty. When the emperor, worn out and exhausted, abdicated in 1556, his successor Ferdinand I discontinued all attempts to regain the Three Bishoprics.

Territory of the Three Bishoprics in the mid 18th century, superimposed on current communes and departments

King Henry II left a permanent garrison in each of the cities and gradually subjected their citizens to his royal authority. The townsmen of Metz filed several petitions to the Imperial Diet for redress, but the retrieval of the lost Three Bishoprics was no longer a main concern of the Empire during the ongoing confessionalization. Initiated by Cardinal Richelieu, the Trois-Évêchés received a certain autonomy with a provincial parlement installed in 1633 in Metz, dominated by the city's patriciate. Civil commotions decreased as the cities prospered under French rule, though the implementation of the gabelle of salt sparked some unrest in Metz. When King Louis XIV acceded to the throne in 1643, he confirmed the privileges of the Metz, Toul and Verdun citizens as his "good and faithful subjects".

The acquisition of the Three Bishoprics was finally recognized by the Holy Roman Empire in the 1648 Peace of Westphalia. The province's territory was further enlarged by parts of the Duchy of Luxembourg around Thionville (Diedenhofen), ceded to France according to the 1659 Treaty of the Pyrenees, as well as by several Lorraine villages annexed in 1661.

The Diocese of Saint-Dié, created in 1777 and sometimes called the "Fourth Bishopric of Lorraine" ("le Quatrième Évêché lorrain"), is not related historically to the Three Bisphoprics.

== Sources ==
- (In French) Trois-Évêchés on the French Wikipedia
- (In French) 450th anniversary celebrations on the French Ministry of Culture's website
- (In French) Biography of Henry II
