= Peace of Passau =

1552 peace treaty guaranteeing Lutheran religious freedoms

Coordinates: 50°07′18″N 8°36′44″E

The Peace of Passau was an attempt to resolve religious tensions in the Holy Roman Empire.

After Emperor Charles V won a victory against Protestant forces in the Schmalkaldic War of 1547, he implemented the Augsburg Interim, which largely reaffirmed Roman Catholic beliefs. This angered many Protestant princes and in January 1552, under the leadership of Maurice of Saxony, several formed an alliance with Henry II of France in the Treaty of Chambord. In return for French funding and assistance, Henry was promised lands in western Germany. In the ensuing Princes' Revolt, also known as the Second Schmalkaldic War, Charles was driven out of Germany to his ancestral lands in Austria by the Protestant alliance, while Henry captured the three Rhine Bishoprics of Metz, Verdun and Toul.

In August 1552, weary from three decades of religious civil war, Charles guaranteed Lutheran religious freedoms in the Peace of Passau. The implementation of the Augsburg Interim was cancelled. The Protestant princes taken prisoner during the Schmalkaldic War, John Frederick of Saxony and Philip of Hesse, were released. A precursor to the Peace of Augsburg of September 1555, the Peace of Passau effectively surrendered Charles V's lifelong quest for European religious unity.

In August 1552 his younger brother Archduke Ferdinand I of Austria concluded the Peace of Passau, whereby he formally accepted the Lutheran Augsburg Confession, confirmed by the emperor himself in the 1555 Peace of Augsburg.
