= Treaty of Chambord =

1552 treaty against Charles V

Coordinates: 47°36′57″N 1°31′02″E

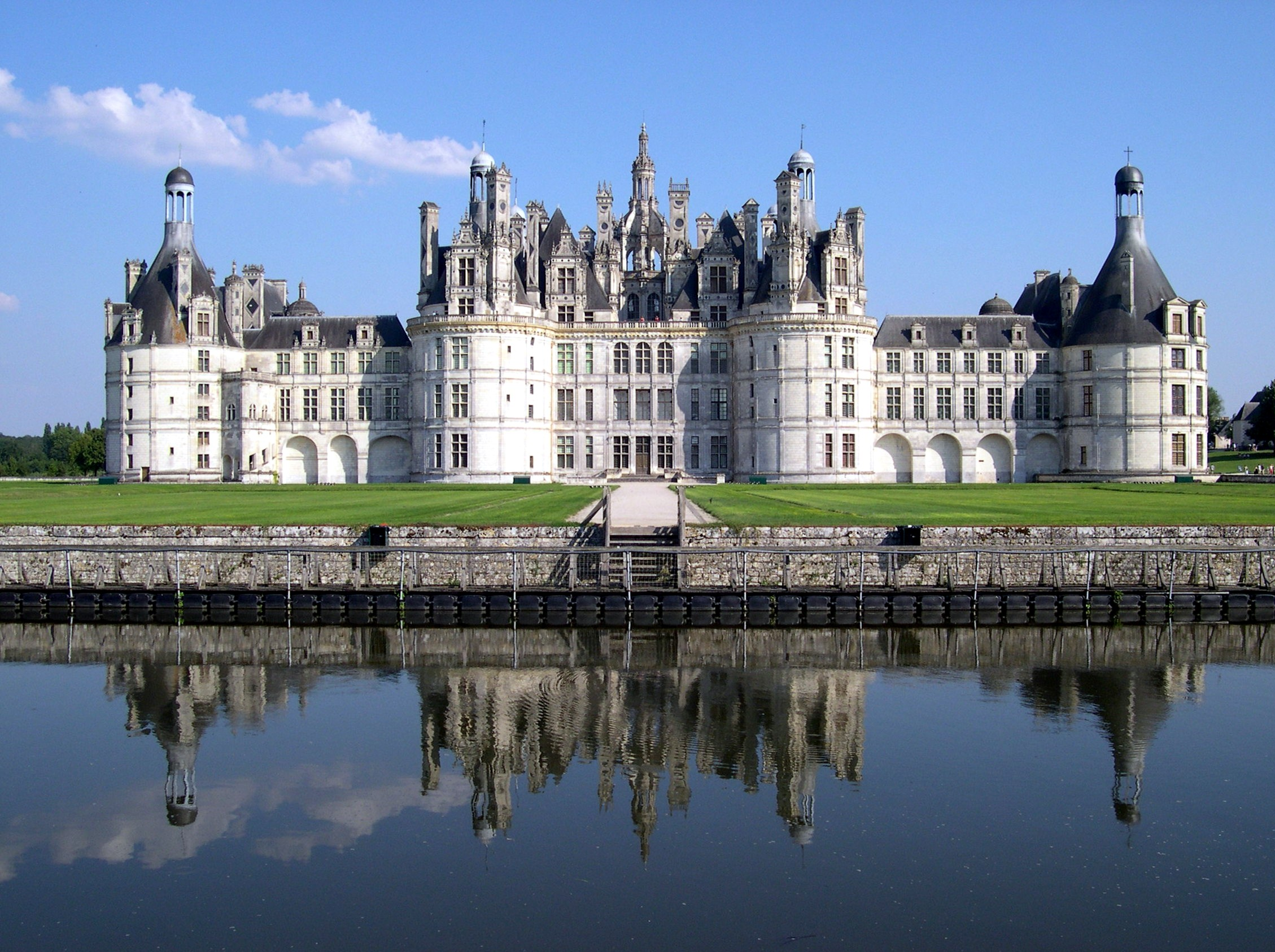
Château de Chambord

The Treaty of Chambord was an agreement signed on 15 January 1552 at the Château de Chambord between the Catholic King Henry II of France and three Protestant princes of the Holy Roman Empire led by Elector Maurice of Saxony. Based on the terms of the treaty, Maurice ceded the vicariate over the Three Bishoprics of Toul, Verdun, and Metz to France. In return, he was promised military and economic aid from Henry II in order to fight against the forces of Emperor Charles V of Habsburg.

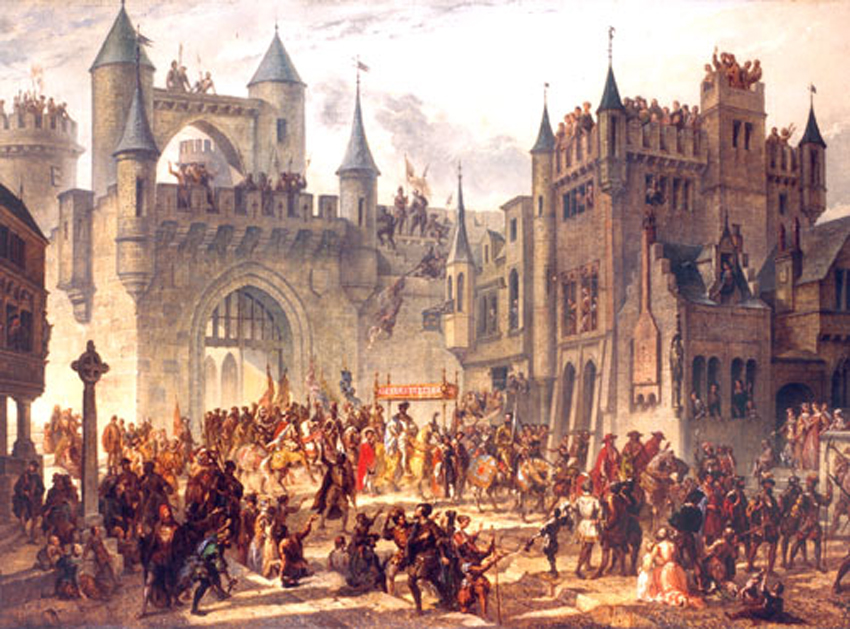
Entrance of King Henri II in Metz on 18 April 1552.

After Emperor Charles V had defeated a number of revolting Protestant princes in the Schmalkaldic War, he in 1548 issued the geharnischt (sharply worded) Augsburg Interim in order to re-integrate the Lutheran movement into the established Catholic Church and to prevent the split of the Empire. To defend their autonomy, several Protestant Imperial States reacted with the 1551 Alliance of Torgau; first of all the Saxon elector Maurice of Wettin, who in the Schmalkaldic War had been a strong supporter of the emperor, but also William IV of Hesse-Kassel, the warlike Hohenzollern margrave Albert Alcibiades of Brandenburg-Kulmbach and his cousin the Prussian duke Albert.

At that time, Maurice was charged by the emperor to campaign and subdue the rebellious city of Magdeburg. When he changed sides, a peace was arranged with the citizens. Meanwhile, French troops under King Henry II marched against the Rhine to occupy the Three Bishoprics. After the allied Lutheran princes had signed the Treaty of Chambord, their forces campaigned Tyrol in the Habsburg hereditary lands and forced Charles V to flee toward the Carinthian town of Villach. In August 1552 his younger brother Archduke Ferdinand I of Austria concluded the Peace of Passau, whereby he formally accepted the Lutheran Augsburg Confession, confirmed by the emperor himself in the 1555 Peace of Augsburg.

Once the armistice with the Protestant princes was declared, Charles V during the Italian War of 1551–59 made several attempts to forcibly regain the overlordship over the Three Bishoprics, the disposal of which was his Imperial privilege. However, his troops were finally defeated by the French under the command of Duke Francis of Guise at the 1554 Battle of Renty. The emperor abdicated two years later and his successor Ferdinand I made no further efforts to win back the dioceses. The incorporation into France was officially acknowledged by the Empire in the 1648 Peace of Westphalia.

== Consequences ==
The Treaty of Chambord was a typical international political example for an agreement at the expense of other parties ("ius quaesitum tertio", in English a "third-party beneficiary contract", in French “promesse de porte-fort”). The princes acting on the German side had given France covenants, which to make they had had neither the right nor any authorization. They ceded rights over imperial territory to a foreign ruler, over which - not only, but mostly because neither was anything near being their very own - they did not execute anything such as a command. Thus the accord was of no account according to judicial standards. According to the text of the treaty, the Three Bishoprics were at the time "not of german language", with the implication that in the eyes of the German signatories, the transfer was ultimately "limited" to non-German lands.

France used the convention as a pretence to militarily occupy the Three Bishoprics, to subsequently remove them out of the collective of the Holy Roman Empire and to incorporate them into its own territory. This approach of the French crown was symptomatic for the French policy during the next decades. It was directed at the utilisation of conflicts between the Emperor and German princes and to support the emperor's respective opponents, so to take own advantage out of it.

== See also ==
- Three Bishoprics
- List of treaties
