= Prince-Bishopric of Metz =

Prince-bishopric of the Holy Roman Empire

Coordinates: 48.78°N 6.53°E

Prince-Bishopric of Metz Principauté épiscopale de Metz (French) Fürstbistum Metz (German) Principatus-Episcopatus Metensis (Latin)
- Prince-bishopric of Holy Roman Empire
- 10th century–1648
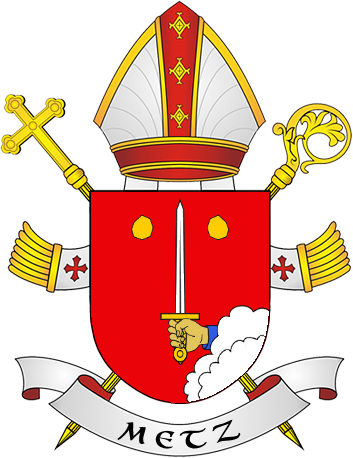
- Coat of arms

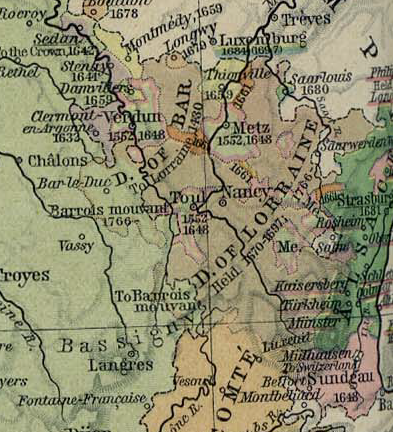
- The Three Bishoprics of Metz, Toul and Verdun, about 1648
- Capital: Metz; Vic-sur-Seille (from 1234)
  - Type: Ecclesiastical principality
- Historical era: Middle Ages
  - County of Metz established: 842
  - Ceded to Metz diocese: 10th century
  - Metz Imperial City: 1189 - 1234
  - Imperial immediacy confirmed: 1357
  - Three Bishoprics annexed by France: 1648
  - Treaty of Westphalia recognises annexation: 1648
Preceded by	Succeeded by
County of Metz	Three Bishoprics

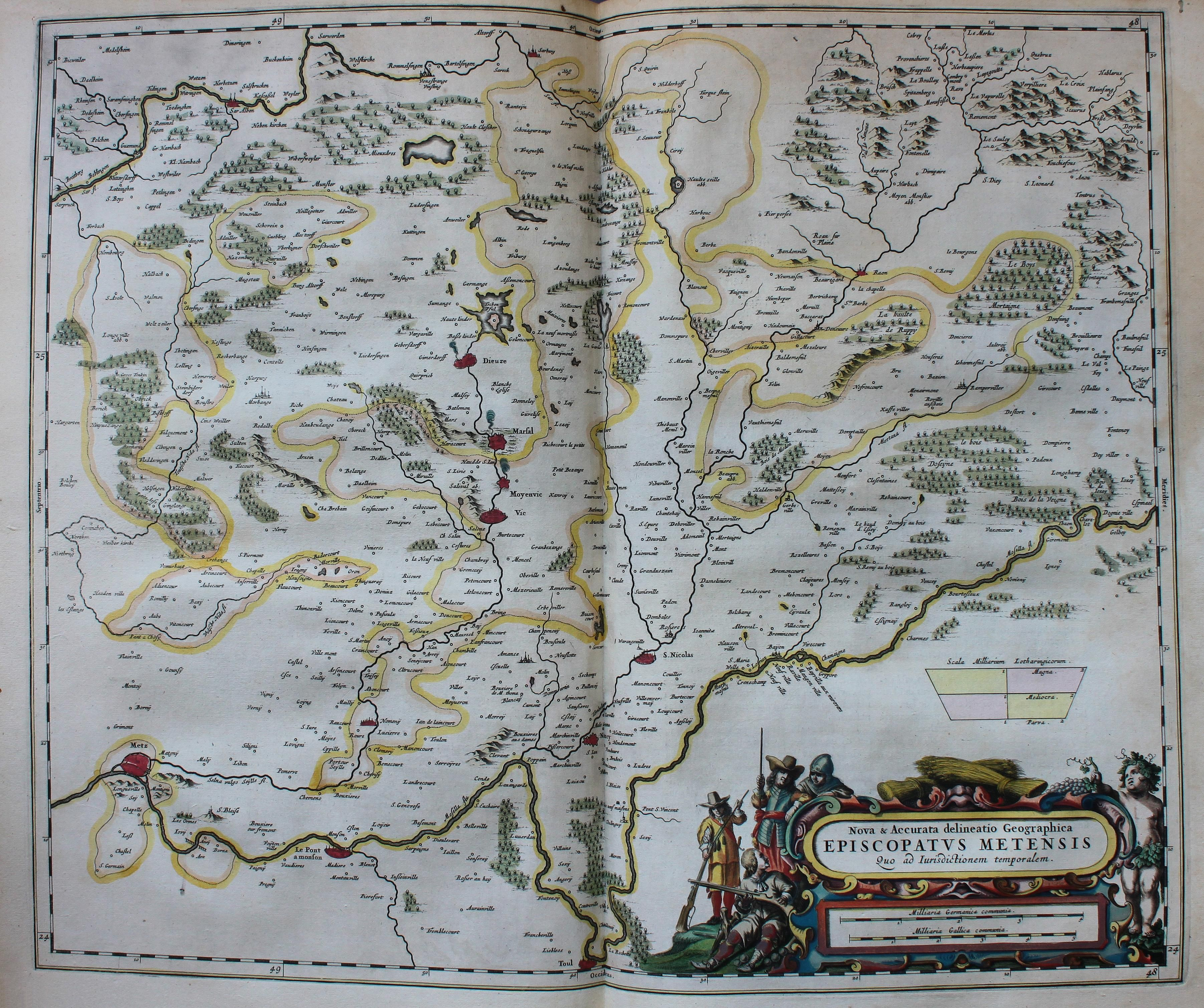
Map of the Bishopric of Metz, 1659

The Prince-Bishopric of Metz was a prince-bishopric of the Holy Roman Empire. It had a different territorial extent from the diocese of Metz, the prince-bishop's ecclesiastical jurisdiction. It was one of the Three Bishoprics that were annexed by France in 1552.

The bishops of Metz had already ruled over a significant amount of territories within the former Kingdom of Lotharingia, which by the 870 Treaty of Meerssen became a part of East Francia. They had to struggle for their independence from the Dukes of Lorraine, acquired the lands of the Counts of Metz, but had to face the rise of their capital Metz to the status of an Imperial City in 1189. In 1234, the unrest of the Metz citizens forced the bishops to move their residence to Vic-sur-Seille.

In 1357, Emperor Charles IV of Luxembourg again confirmed the bishopric's Imperial immediacy. From the accession of Henri of Lorraine-Vaudémont in 1484 however, the diocese was ruled by bishops from the House of Lorraine, who by their close relations with the House of Valois brought Metz unter the influence of the French crown. By the 1552 Treaty of Chambord, an alliance of revolting Protestant Imperial princes led by Elector Maurice of Saxony promised the overlordship over the Three Bishoprics of Metz, Toul and Verdun to King Henry II of France. Metz was occupied by Henry's troops and annexed by the French crown, finally acknowledged by the Empire in the 1648 Peace of Westphalia.

== Sources ==
- Black, Jeremy (2004). Kings, Nobles and Commoners: States and Societies in Early Modern Europe. I.B. Tauris. ISBN 9780857714084.
- Whaley, Joachim (2012). Germany and the Holy Roman Empire. Vol. I, Maximilian I to the Peace of Westphalia, 1493–1648. Oxford University Press. ISBN 9780198731016.

== See also ==
- Roman Catholic Diocese of Metz
- List of bishops of Metz
