= Henry II of France =

King of France from 1547 to 1559

Henry II
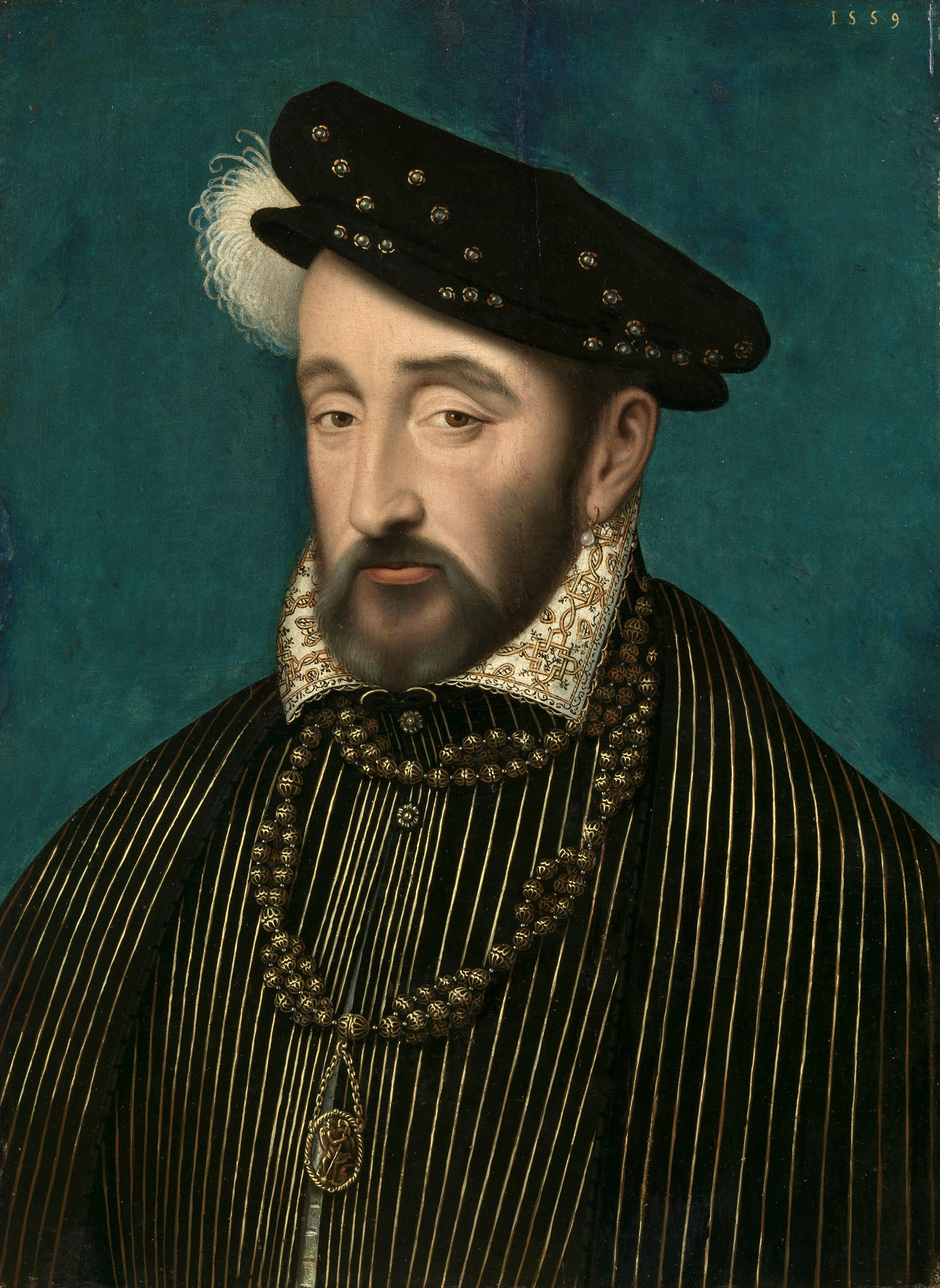
- Portrait by François Clouet, 1559

King of France
- Reign: 31 March 1547 – 10 July 1559
- Coronation: 25 July 1547
- Predecessor: Francis I
- Successor: Francis II

Duke of Brittany
- Reign: 10 August 1536 – 13 August 1547
- Predecessor: Francis III
- Born: Henry, Duke of Orléans; 31 March 1519; Château de Saint-Germain-en-Laye, France
- Died: 10 July 1559 (aged 40); Hôtel des Tournelles, Paris, France
- Burial: 13 August 1559; Saint Denis Basilica
- Spouse: Catherine de' Medici (m. 1533)
- Issue more...: Francis II of France; Elisabeth, Queen of Spain; Claude, Duchess of Lorraine; Louis, Duke of Orléans; Charles IX of France; Henry III of France; Margaret, Queen of France; Francis, Duke of Anjou; Victoria of Valois; Joan of Valois; Illegitimate: Diane, Duchess of Angoulême; Henri, Duke of Angoulême; Henri, Count of Saint-Rémi
- House: Valois-Angoulême
- Father: Francis I of France
- Mother: Claude, Duchess of Brittany
- Religion: Catholicism

Henry II (French: Henri II; 31 March 1519 – 10 July 1559) was King of France from 1547 until his death in 1559. The second son of Francis I and Claude, Duchess of Brittany, he became Dauphin of France upon the death of his elder brother Francis in 1536.

As a child, Henry and his elder brother spent over four years in captivity in Spain as hostages in exchange for their father. Henry pursued his father's policies in matters of art, war, and religion. He persevered in the Italian Wars against the Habsburgs and tried to suppress the Reformation, even as the Huguenot numbers were increasing drastically in France during his reign.

Under the April 1559 Peace of Cateau-Cambrésis which ended the Italian Wars, France renounced its claims in Italy, but gained certain other territories, including the Pale of Calais and the Three Bishoprics. These acquisitions strengthened French borders while the abdication of Charles V, Holy Roman Emperor in January 1556 and division of his empire between Spain and Austria provided France with greater flexibility in foreign policy. Nostradamus also served King Henry as physician and astrologer.

In June 1559, Henry was injured in a jousting tournament held to celebrate the treaty, and died ten days later after his surgeon, Ambroise Paré, was unable to cure the wound inflicted by Gabriel de Montgomery, the captain of his Scottish Guard. Though he died early, the succession appeared secure, for he left four young sons – as well as a widow (Catherine de' Medici) to lead a capable regency during their minority. Three of those sons lived long enough to become king; but their youth and sometimes infirmity, and the unpopularity of Catherine's regency, led to challenges to the throne by powerful nobles, and helped to spark the French Wars of Religion between Catholics and Protestants, and an eventual end to the House of Valois as France's ruling dynasty.

== Early years and accession ==
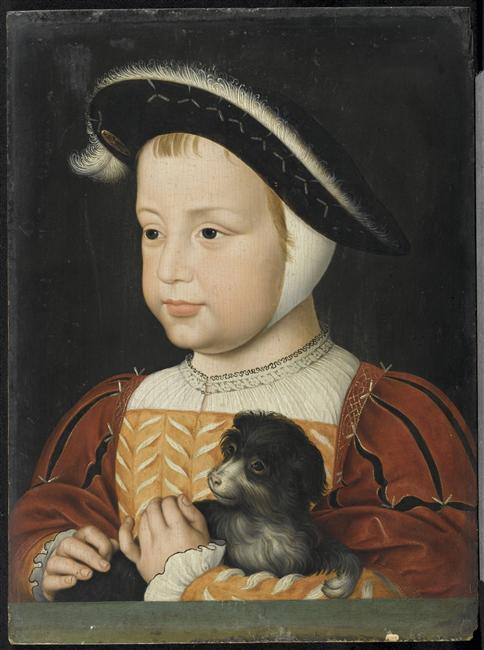
Henry as a child

Henry was born on 31 March 1519 at the royal Château de Saint-Germain-en-Laye, near Paris. He was the second son of King Francis I and Claude, Duchess of Brittany, the daughter of Louis XII and Anne, Duchess of Brittany. Francis and Claude were second cousins, both descended in the male line from Louis I, Duke of Orléans, and their marriage helped secure Brittany's connection to the French crown.

After Francis I was captured by the forces of Charles V, Holy Roman Emperor, at the Battle of Pavia in 1525, Henry and his elder brother Francis were sent to Spain as hostages to secure their father’s release. They remained in captivity for over four years.

On 28 October 1533, Henry married Catherine de' Medici, a member of the ruling family of Florence. Both bride and groom were fourteen, and the marriage was arranged while Henry’s elder brother was still heir to the throne. The wedding ceremony was officiated by Pope Clement VII, himself a member of the Medici family.

Henry also developed a close attachment to Diane de Poitiers, a noblewoman more than twenty years his senior. She had been associated with him since childhood, and by the 1530s had become an important personal influence. At a tournament held in 1531 to honour Eleanor of Austria, Henry wore Diane’s colours.

Henry became heir apparent in August 1536 after his elder brother Francis died several days after falling ill following a game of tennis. Contemporary accounts, including Brantôme's, attributed the illness to cold water Francis drank after exercise and reported immediate rumours of poisoning. Baumgartner notes, however, that the autopsy report gave no indication of poison and suggests that Francis's death was probably caused by a respiratory illness, possibly pleurisy.

Diane de Poitiers became an influential figure in Henry's personal life, while Catherine initially had limited influence over her husband. According to Wellman, Diane encouraged Henry to maintain marital relations with Catherine in order to secure the succession. The marriage produced no children during its first decade, but Catherine gave birth to their first son, the future Francis II, in 1544.

Henry's attachment to Diane caused a breach with his father in 1544. Francis I's mistress Anne de Pisseleu d'Heilly, persuaded the king that Henry and Diane were conspiring on behalf of the Constable Montmorency, who had been banished from court in 1540. Francis banished Diane from court, and Henry withdrew to the Château d'Anet. Father and son were reconciled in 1545.

Francis I died on 31 March 1547, Henry's 28th birthday, and Henry succeeded him as king. He was crowned at Reims Cathedral on 25 July 1547.

== Reign ==
=== Religious policy ===
Henry's reign intensified the repression of Protestants, who gradually emerged as a distinct Huguenot movement. Sutherland argues that this persecution reached its climax under Henry, partly because of the influence of Charles, Cardinal of Lorraine, brother of Francis, Duke of Guise. At Henry's coronation, Lorraine urged the king to defend the Roman Church, and Henry promised to act against those whom the Church identified as heretical.

From the beginning of his reign, he sought to strengthen the prosecution and prevention of heresy. An edict of 5 April 1547 reaffirmed punishments for blasphemy, including judicial torture, public whipping and cutting off the tongue. In October 1547, Henry created a new chamber in the Parlement of Paris devoted to hearing heresy cases; it became known as the chambre ardente because of its zealous pursuit of heresy.

Baumgartner argues that Henry's severity toward Protestants was rooted less in outside influence than in his own commitment to Catholic orthodoxy, his coronation oath to drive heresy from the realm, and his belief that religious unity was necessary for political order.

The Edict of Châteaubriant, issued on 27 June 1551, formed part of this wider policy of repression. During Henry's reign, these religious tensions shaped French activity overseas, as Huguenots attempted to establish a colony in Brazil, resulting in the short-lived settlement of France Antarctique.

=== Foreign policy and dynastic marriages ===
Henry II was made a Knight of the Garter by Edward VI, King of England, in April 1551. By 19 July, after some lengthy haggling concerning the dowry, a betrothal was made between his daughter, Elisabeth and Edward.

=== Italian War of 1551–1559 ===
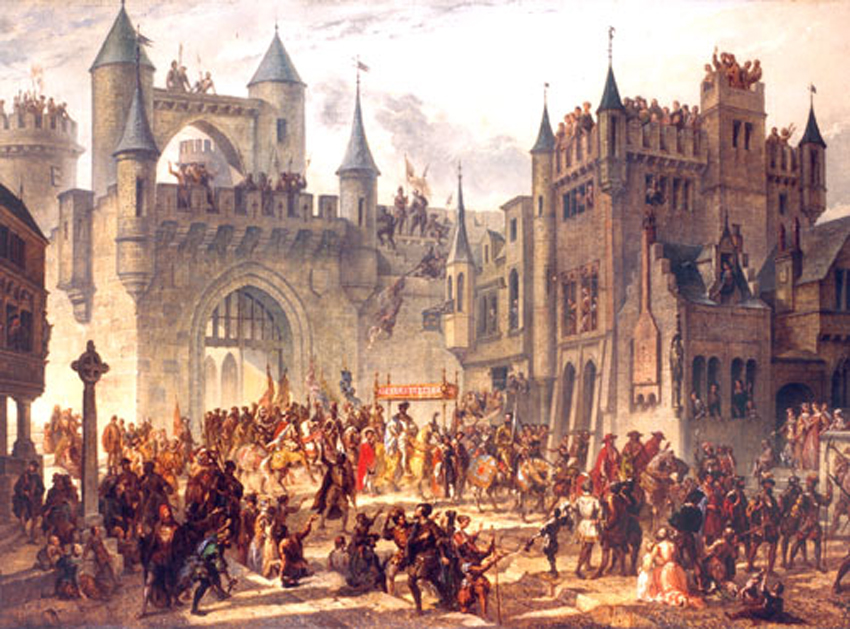
Henry II enters Metz following the 1552 Treaty of Chambord

The Italian War of 1551–1559 began when Henry declared war on Holy Roman Emperor Charles V with the intent of recapturing Italy and ensuring French, rather than Habsburg, domination of European affairs. Persecution of Protestants at home did not prevent him from becoming allied with German Protestant princes at the Treaty of Chambord in 1552. Simultaneously, the continuation of his father's Franco-Ottoman alliance allowed him to invade the Rhineland while a Franco-Ottoman fleet defended southern France. Although an attempted 1553 invasion of Tuscany ended with defeat at Marciano, in return for his support in the Second Schmalkaldic War, Henry occupied the Three Bishoprics of Toul, Verdun and Metz, acquisitions secured with victory at Renty in 1554.

After the abdication of Charles V in 1556, the Habsburg empire was split between his son Philip II of Spain and brother Emperor Ferdinand I. The focus of Henry's conflict with the Habsburgs shifted to Flanders, where Philip, in conjunction with Emmanuel Philibert, Duke of Savoy, defeated the French at St Quentin. England's entry into the war later that year led to the French capture of Calais, and French armies plundered the Spanish Netherlands.

Henry raised the young Mary, Queen of Scots, at his court, hoping to establish a dynastic claim to the Kingdom of Scotland by her marriage to Dauphin Francis on 24 April 1558. Their son would have been King of France and King of Scotland, and also a claimant to the throne of England. Henry had Mary sign secret documents, illegal in Scottish law, that would ensure Valois rule in Scotland even if Mary died without leaving a child by Francis. As it happened, Francis died without issue a year and half after his father, ending the French claim to Scotland.

However, in April 1559 lack of money and increasing domestic religious tensions led Henry to agree the Peace of Cateau-Cambrésis. The Peace was signed between Henry and Elizabeth I on 2 April and between Henry and Philip of Spain on 3 April 1559 at Le Cateau-Cambrésis. Under its terms, France restored Piedmont and Savoy to Emmanuel Philibert, but retained Saluzzo, Calais and the Three Bishoprics. The agreement was reinforced by a marriage between Henry's sister Margaret and Emmanuel Philibert, while his daughter Elisabeth of Valois became Philip's third wife.

In June 1559, with war against the Habsburgs concluded, Henri established in letters patent his desire to task much of the Gendarmerie that had been involved in the foreign wars with the extirpation of domestic heresy.

== Patent innovation ==
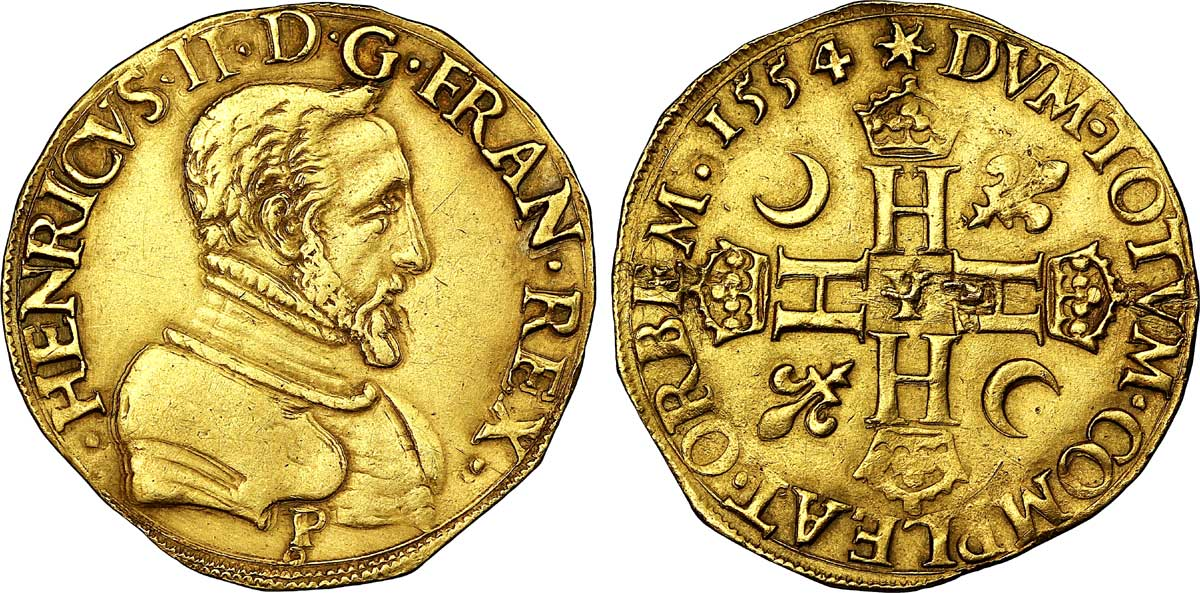
Henry II

Henry II introduced the concept of publishing the description of an invention in the form of a patent. The idea was to require an inventor to disclose his invention in exchange for monopoly rights to the patent. The description is called a patent "specification". The first patent specification was submitted by the inventor Abel Foullon for Usaige & Description de l'holmetre (a type of rangefinder). Publication was delayed until after the patent expired in 1561.

== Death ==
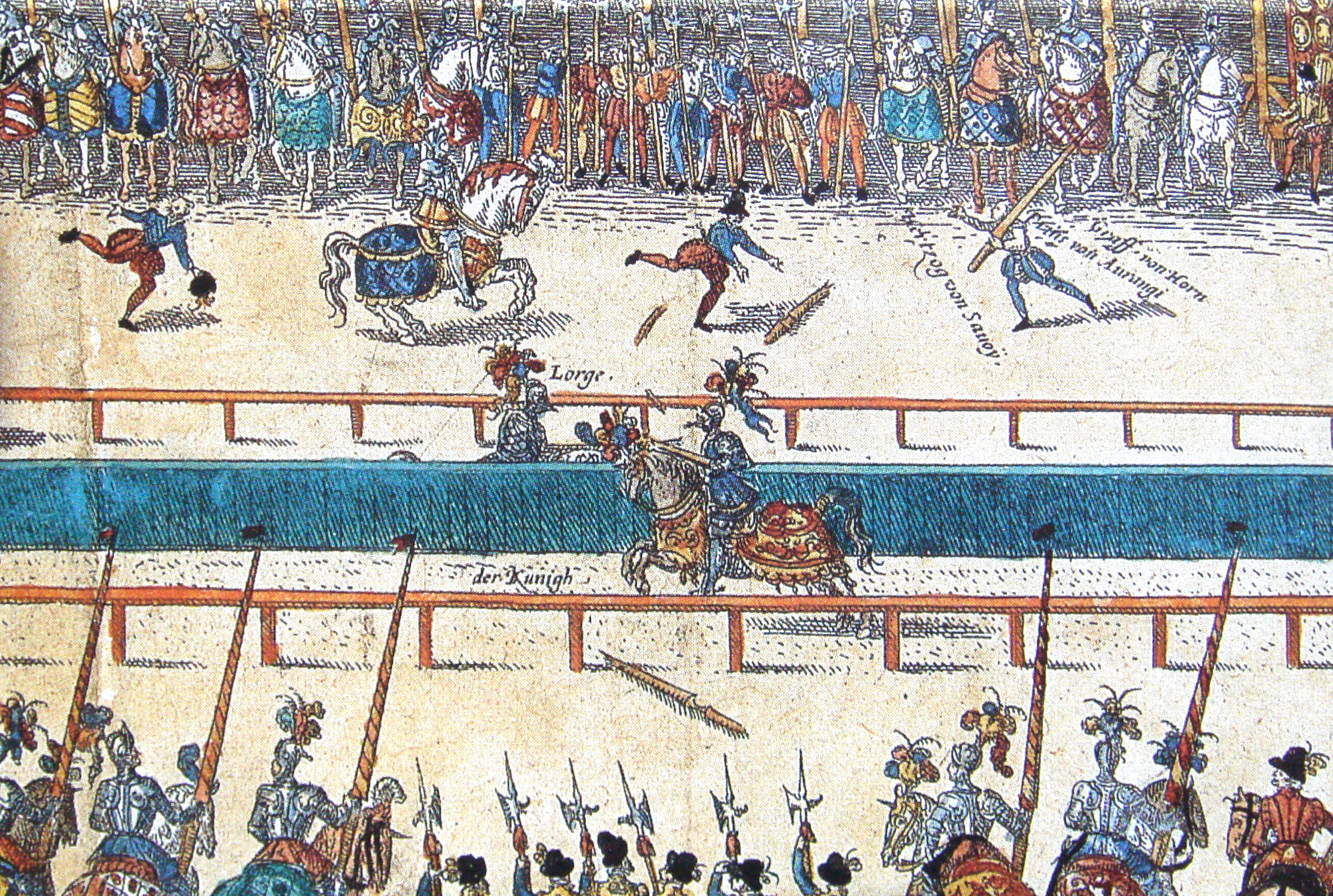
The fatal tournament between Henry II and Montgomery (Lord of "Lorges")

Henry II was an avid hunter and a participant in jousts and tournaments. On 30 June 1559, a tournament was held near Place des Vosges to celebrate the Peace of Cateau-Cambrésis and the marriage of his daughter Elisabeth of Valois to King Philip II of Spain. During a jousting match, Henry, wearing the colours of his mistress Diane de Poitiers, was wounded in the eye by a fragment of the splintered lance of Gabriel Montgomery, captain of the King's Scottish Guard. Contemporary accounts reported that the visor of Henry's helmet was not properly secured. Zanello et al. note that both Claude Haton and Jean de Serres described it as being lowered or improperly closed, which may have left Henry's eye exposed when Montgomery's lance splintered.

Despite the efforts of royal surgeons Ambroise Paré and Andreas Vesalius, the court doctors ultimately "advocated a wait-and-see strategy". Modern medical analysis suggests that Henry died from an infection caused by a retained wooden fragment in the wound, complicated by intracranial infection. He was buried in a cadaver tomb in Saint Denis Basilica. Henry's death played a significant role in the decline of jousting as a sport, particularly in France.

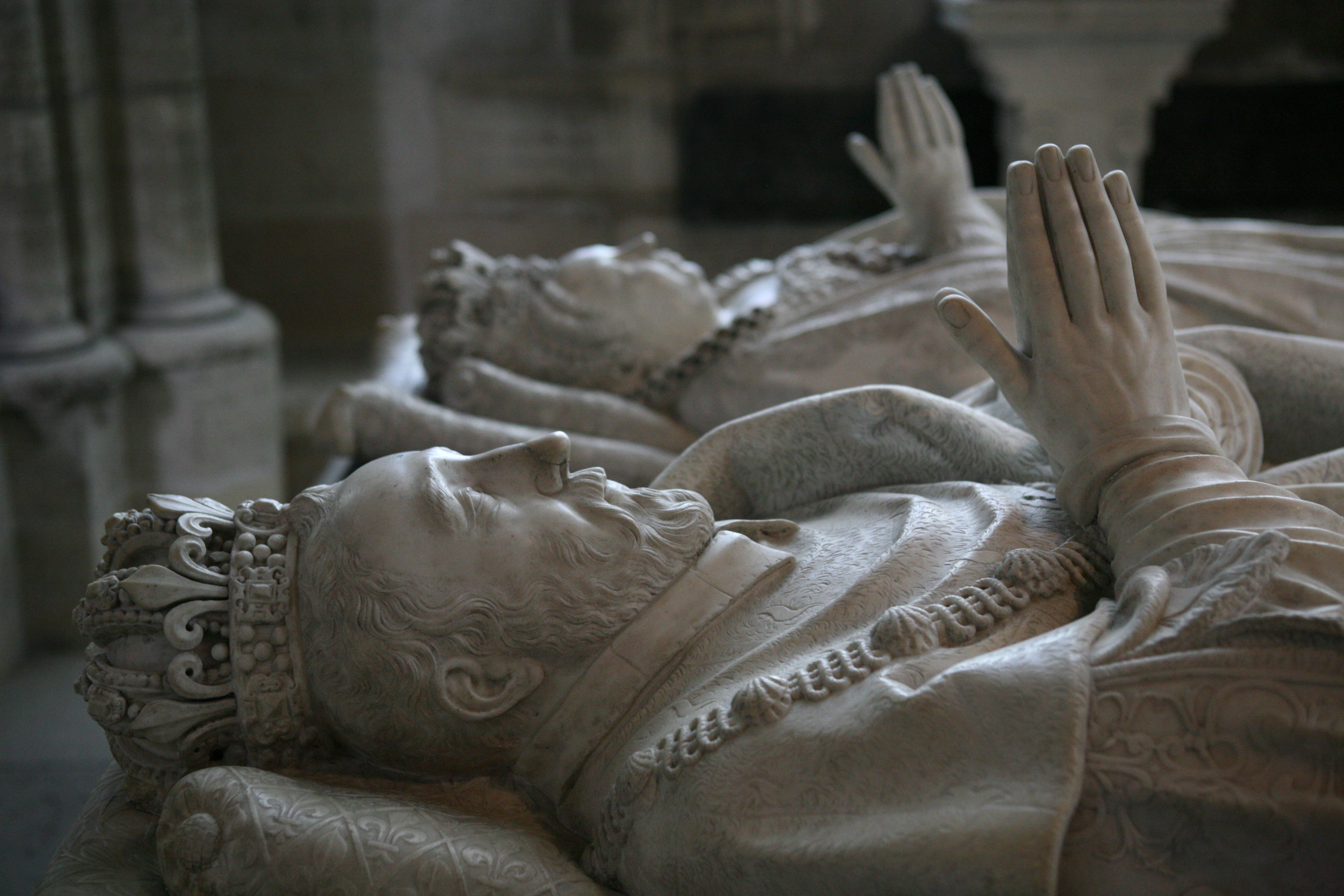
Tombs of Henry II of France and his wife Catherine de' Medici in Basilica of St Denis, Paris

As Henry lay dying, Queen Catherine limited access to his bedside and denied Diane de Poitiers permission to see him, even though he repeatedly asked for her. Following his death, Catherine sent Diane into exile, where she lived in comfort on her own properties until her death.

It was the practice to enclose the heart of the king in an urn. The Monument to the Heart of Henry II is in the collection of the Louvre, but was originally in the Chapel of Orleans beneath a pyramid. The original bronze urn holding the king's heart was destroyed during the French Revolution and a replica was made in the 19th century. The marble sculpture of the Three Graces holding the urn, executed from a single piece of marble by Germain Pilon, the sculptor to Catherine de' Medici, survives.

Henry was succeeded by his sickly fifteen-year-old son, Francis II. Francis was married to sixteen-year-old Mary, Queen of Scots, who had been his childhood friend and fiancée since her arrival at the French court when she was five. Francis II died in December 1560, and Mary returned to Scotland in August 1561. Francis II was succeeded by his ten-year-old brother Charles IX. His mother, Catherine de' Medici, acted as regent.

== Children ==
Catherine de' Medici bore ten of Henry's children:

- Francis II, born 19 January 1544, who married Mary, Queen of Scots
- Elizabeth of France, born 2 April 1546, who married Philip II, King of Spain
- Claude, born 12 November 1547, who married Charles III, Duke of Lorraine
- Louis, Duke of Orléans, born 3 February 1549, died 24 October 1550
- Charles IX, born 27 June 1550, died 30 May 1574, who married Elisabeth of Austria
- Henry III, born 19 September 1551, died 2 August 1589, who married Louise of Lorraine, also briefly King of Poland
- Margaret, born 14 May 1553, who married Henry III, King of Navarre (later Henry IV of France)
- Hercules, born 18 March 1555, later known as Francis, Duke of Alençon and Anjou. died 1584
- Victoire, born 24 June 1556, died 17 August 1556
- Joan, born 24 June 1556.

Henry II also had three illegitimate children:

- By Filippa Duci:
  - Diane, duchesse d'Angoulême (1538–1619). At the age of fourteen, she married Orazio Farnese, Duke of Castro, who died in battle in 1553. Her second marriage was to François, Duke of Montmorency.
- By Lady Janet Stewart (1502–1562), the illegitimate daughter of James IV of Scotland:
  - Henri d'Angoulême (1551 – June 1586). He was legitimized and became governor of Provence.
- By Nicole de Savigny:
  - Henri de Saint-Rémi (1557–1621). He was given the title of Count of Saint-Rémy. One of his last known descendants was Jeanne de Valois-Saint-Rémy, Countess de la Motte, famous for her role in the Affair of the Diamond Necklace at the court of Louis XVI.

== Portrayals ==
Henri or Henry has had five notable portrayals onscreen:

He was played by a young Roger Moore in the 1956 film Diane, opposite Lana Turner in the title role and Marisa Pavan as Catherine de' Medici.

In the 1994 film Nostradamus, he is played by Anthony Higgins.

In the 1998 film Ever After, the Prince Charming figure, portrayed by Dougray Scott, shares his name with the historical monarch.

In the 2013 CW series Reign, he is played by Alan van Sprang.

In the premiere of The Serpent Queen (2022), a young Henri (Alex Heath) is shown meeting and marrying Catherine de' Medici, performing consummation of the marriage, jousting, and snuggling in the older Diane's arms. Beginning with the fourth episode, older Henri is portrayed by Lee Ingleby.

== Gallery ==
Royal Monogram

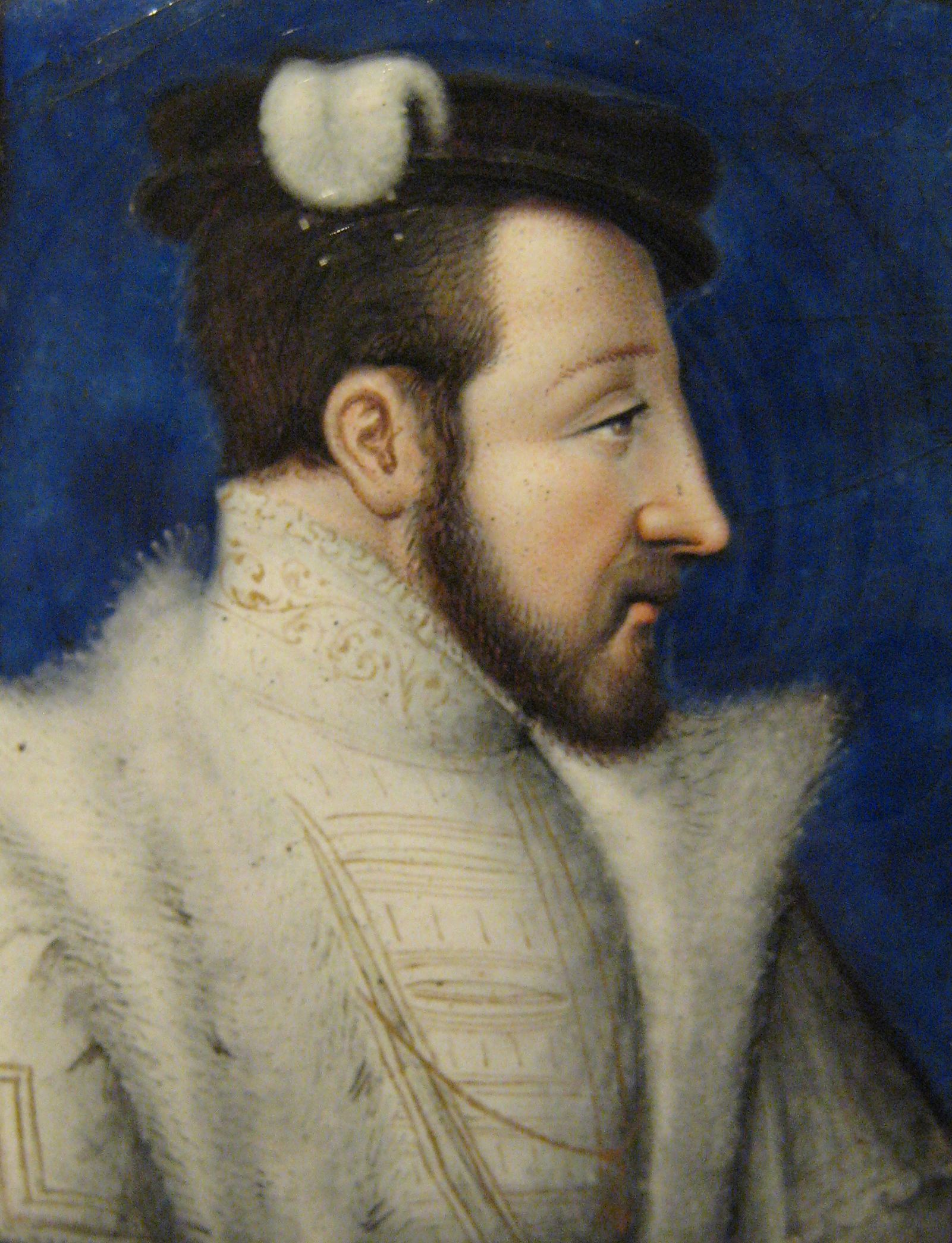
Detail from portrait plaque, enamel and gilding on copper

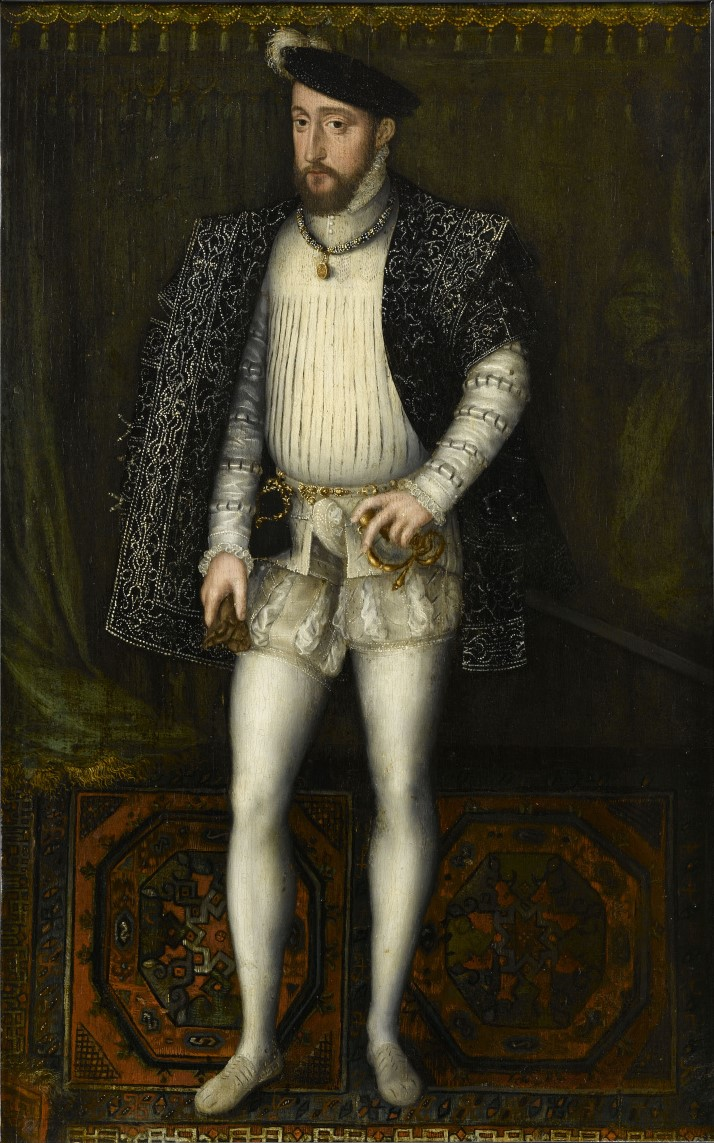
Henry II, here standing on an oriental carpet, continued the policy of Franco-Ottoman alliance of his father Francis I. Painting by François Clouet.

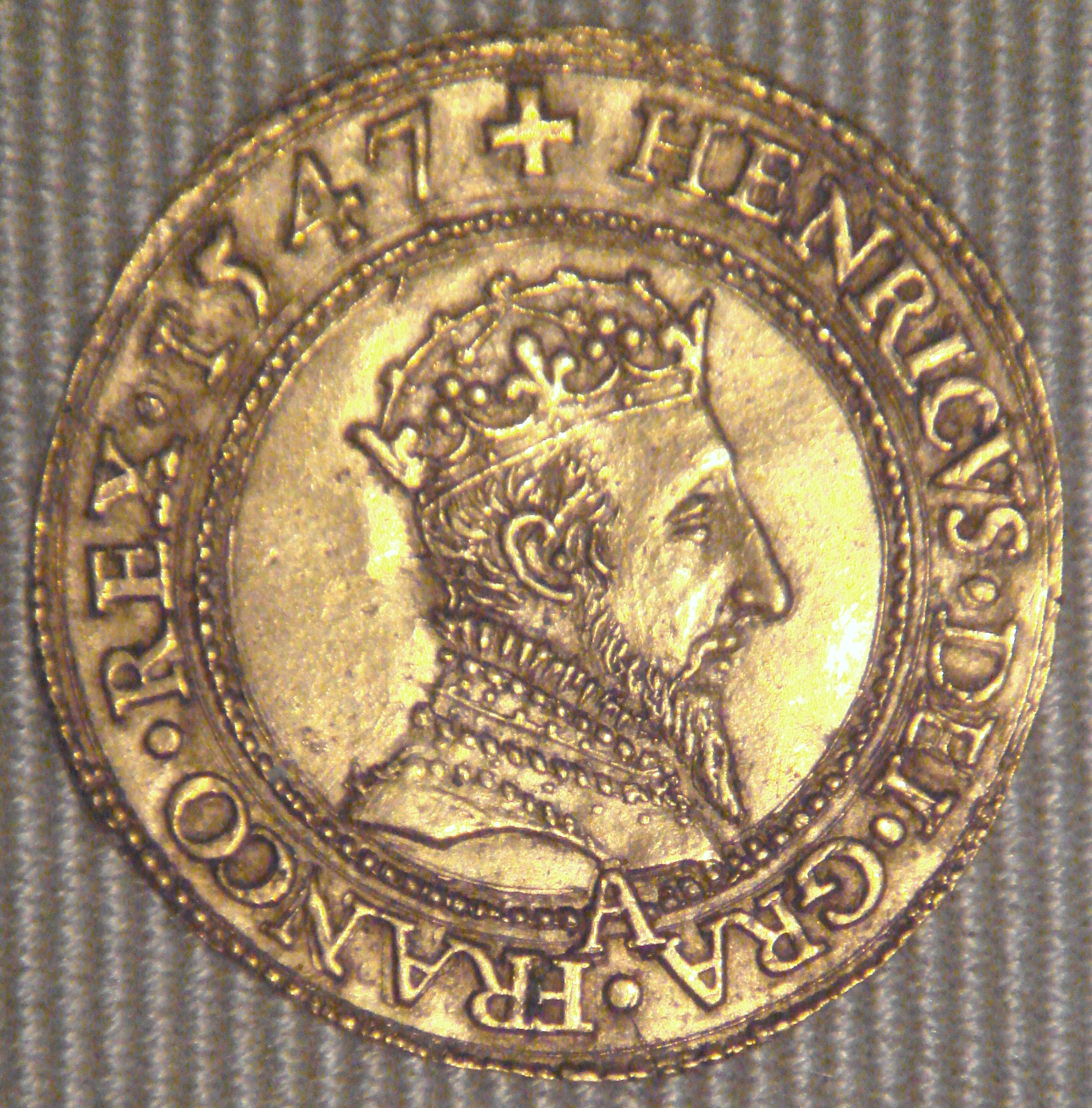
Coin of Henry II, 1547

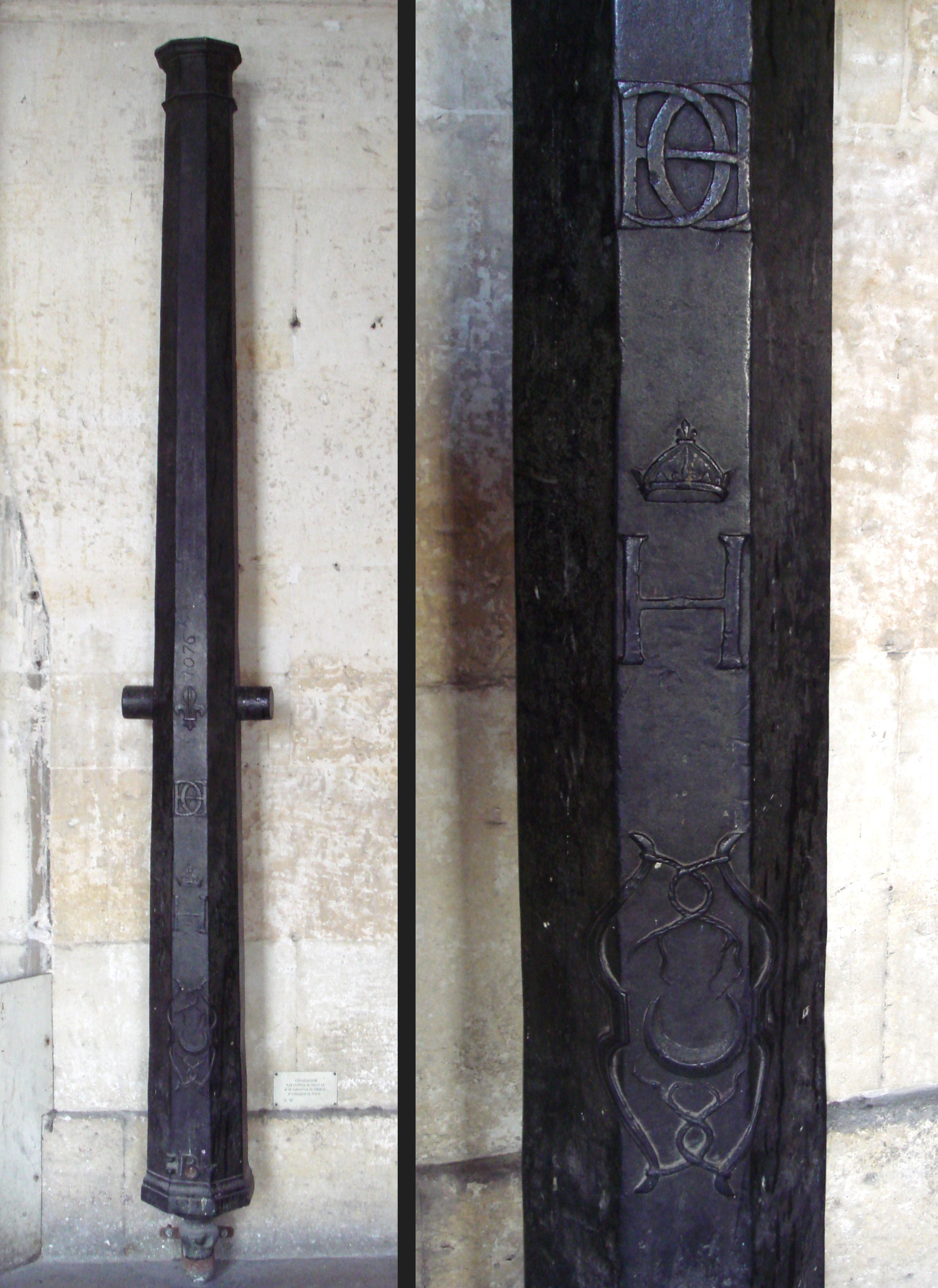
"Bastard culverin" of 1548, with arms of Henri II and Catherine de Medicis and crescent of Diane de Poitiers. Caliber: 85 mm, length: 300 cm, weight: 1076 kg.

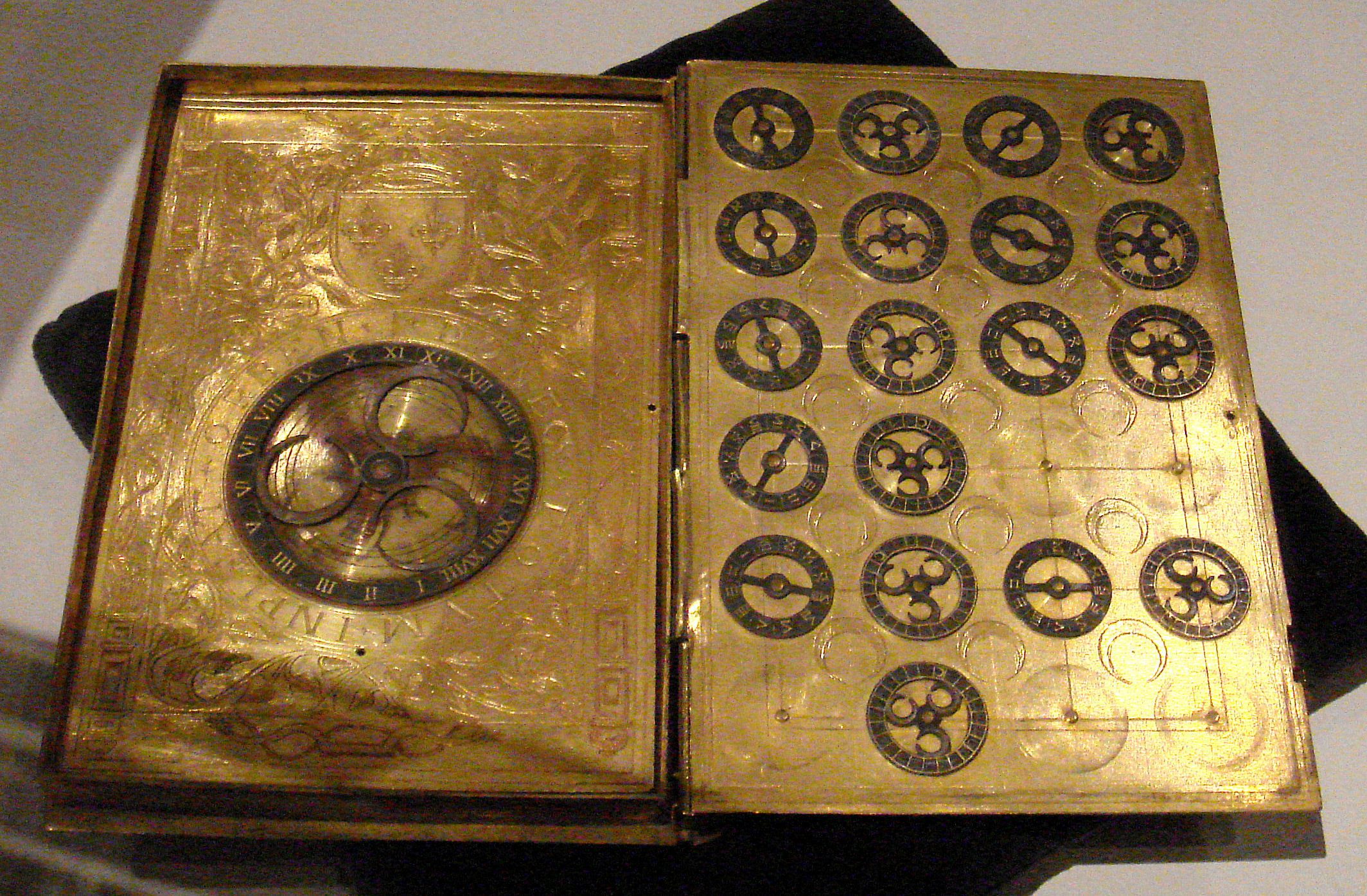
A cypher machine in the shape of a book, with arms of Henri II.

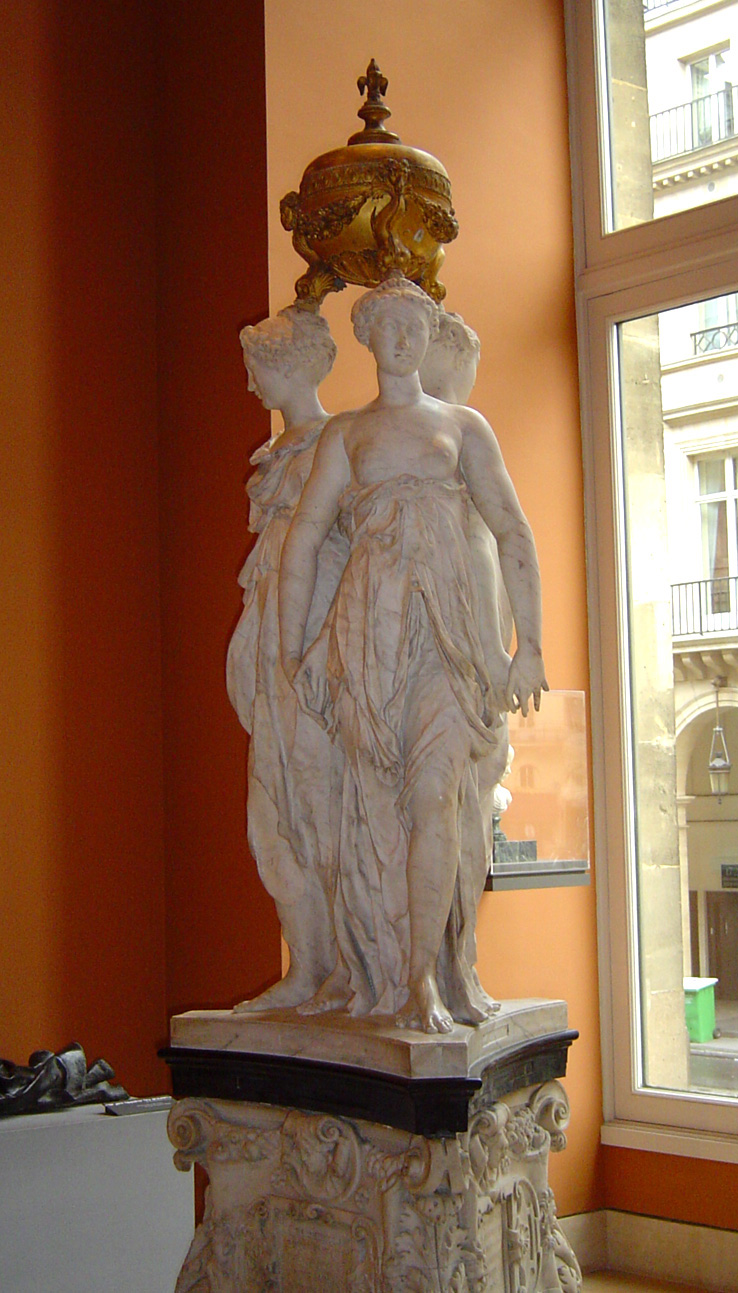
Monument to the Heart of Henry II, Louvre, Paris, sculpture of the Three Graces by Germain Pilon holding a replica of the urn that contained the king's heart

== Sources ==
- Anselme de Sainte-Marie, Père (1726). Histoire généalogique et chronologique de la maison royale de France [Genealogical and chronological history of the royal house of France] (in French). Vol. 1 (3rd ed.). Paris: La compagnie des libraires. pp. 134–136.
- Barber, Richard; Barker, Juliet (1989). Tournaments: Jousts, Chivalry and Pageants in the Middle Ages. Boydell. pp. 134, 139. ISBN 978-0-85115-470-1.
- Baumgartner, Frederic J (1988). Henry II, King of France, 1547–1559. Duke University Press. ISBN 9780822307952.
- Brantôme, Pierre de Bourdeille, seigneur de (1867). Lalanne, Ludovic (ed.). Œuvres complètes de Pierre de Bourdeille, seigneur de Brantôme [Complete Works of Pierre de Bourdeille, Lord of Brantôme] (in French). Vol. 3. Paris: Chez Mme. Ve. Jules Renouard.
- Inalcik, Halil (1995). "The Heyday and Decline of the Ottoman Empire". In Holt, P.M.; Lambton, Ann Katherine Swynford; Lewis, Bernard (eds.). The Cambridge History of Islam. Vol. 1A. Cambridge University Press.
- Felix, Regina R.; Juall, Scott D., eds. (2016). Cultural Exchanges Between Brazil and France. Purdue University Press.
- Frumkin, M. (March 1945). "The Origin of Patent". Journal of the Patent Office Society. XXVII (3).
- Fraser, Antonia (1991). "Mary, byname Mary Queen of Scots". The New Encyclopædia Britannica. Vol. 7. pp. 900–901.
- Goldberg, Victoria L. (1966). "Graces, Muses, and Arts: The Urns of Henry II and Francis I". Journal of the Warburg and Courtauld Institutes. 29: 206–218. doi:10.2307/750716. JSTOR 750716. S2CID 194963087.
- Guy, John (2012). My Heart is my Own: The Life of Mary Queen of Scots. Penguin Books Ltd.
- Harding, Robert (1978). Anatomy of a Power Elite. Yale University Press. ISBN 0300022026.
- Knecht, R.J. (1984). Francis I. Cambridge University Press.
- Knecht, R. J. (1997). Catherine De'Medici. Longman.
- Knecht, R.J. (2000). The French Civil Wars, 1562–1598. Pearson Education Ltd.
- Konnert, Mark (2006). Early Modern Europe: The Age of Religious War, 1559–1715. University of Toronto Press.
- Lanza, Janine M (2007). From Wives to Widows in Early Modern Paris: Gender, Economy, and Law. Ashgate Publishing.
- Loach, Jennifer (2014). Edward VI. Yale University Press.
- Merrill, Robert V. (November 1935). "Considerations on "Les Amours de I. du Bellay"". Modern Philology. 33 (2): 129–138. doi:10.1086/388187. S2CID 161187778.
- Nolan, Cathal J., ed. (2006). "Cateau-Cambresis". The Age of Wars of Religion, 1000–1650: An Encyclopedia of Global Warfare and Civilization. Vol. 1. Greenwood Press.
- Nostradamus, César (1614). Histoire et Chronique de Provence. Simon Rigaud.
- Sealy, Robert J. (1981). The Palace Academy of Henry III. Droz.
- Sutherland, Nicola M. (1980). The Huguenot Struggle for Recognition. New Haven: Yale University Press. ISBN 9780300023282.
- Tazón, Juan E. (2003). The life and times of Thomas Stukeley (c.1525–78). Ashgate Publishing Ltd.
- Thevet, André (2010). Portraits from the French Renaissance and the Wars of Religion. Translated by Benson, Edward. Truman State University Press.
- Thorndike, Lynn (1941). History of Magic and Experimental Science. Vol. 6. New York: Columbia University Press.
- Watkins, John (2009). "Marriage a la Mode, 1559: Elisabeth de Valois, Elizabeth I, and the Changing Practice of Dynastic Marriage". In Levin, Carole; Bucholz, R. O. (eds.). Queens and Power in Medieval and Early Modern England. University of Nebraska Press.
- Wellman, Kathleen (2013). Queens and Mistresses of Renaissance France. Yale University Press.
- Zanello, Marc; Charlier, Philippe; Corns, Robert; Devaux, Bertrand; Berche, Patrick; Pallud, Johan (January 2015). "The death of Henry II, King of France (1519–1559). From myth to medical and historical fact". Acta Neurochirurgica. 157 (1): 145–149. doi:10.1007/s00701-014-2280-9. PMID 25421951.

Henry II of France House of Valois, Orléans-Angoulême branch Cadet branch of the Capetian dynasty Born: 31 March 1519 Died: 10 July 1559
Regnal titles
Preceded by Francis I	King of France; 31 March 1547 – 10 July 1559	Succeeded by Francis II
French nobility
Vacant Title last held by Louis II	Duke of Orléans; 1519–1536	Succeeded by Charles II
Preceded by Francis III	Duke of Brittany; 10 August 1536 – 13 August 1547	Merged with Crown
French royalty
Preceded by Francis	Dauphin of France; 10 August 1536 – 31 March 1547	Succeeded by Francis
