= Sébastien de L'Aubespine =

16th century French noble and diplomat

Sébastien de L'Aubespine abbot of Basse-Fontaine bishop of Limoges
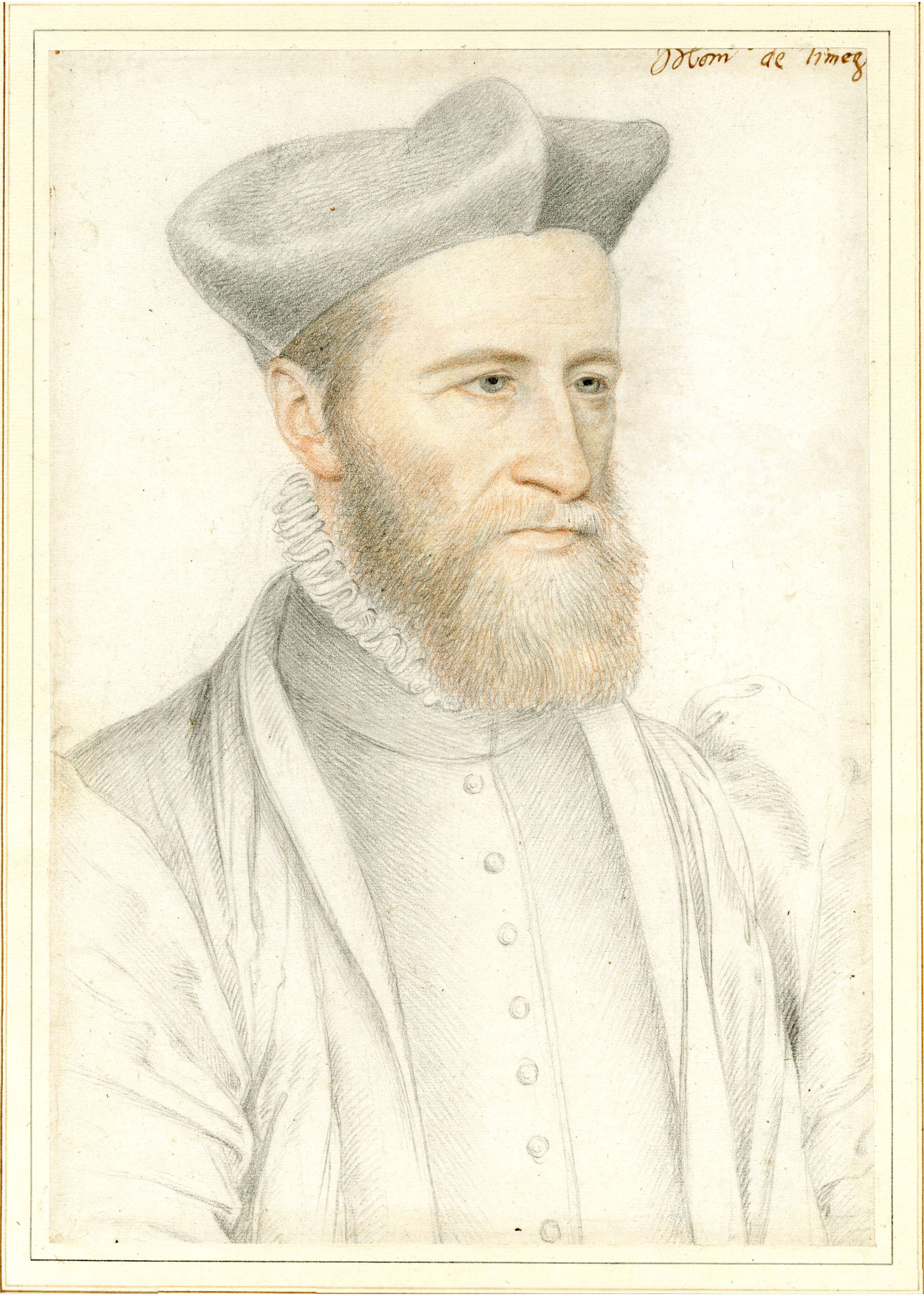
- Sketch of the bishop of Limoges

8th French Ambassador to Spain

French Ambassador to the Holy Roman Empire
- In office 1550 – July 1551
- Preceded by: Vacant
- Succeeded by: Vacant

French Ambassador to Spain
- In office February 1556 – January 1557
- Preceded by: Vacant
- Succeeded by: Vacant

French Ambassador to Spain
- In office May 1559 – June 1562
- Preceded by: Vacant
- Succeeded by: Seigneur de Saint-Sulpice

Personal details
- Born: 1518
- Died: 1582 (aged 63–64)
- Relations: Claude II de L'Aubespine (brother)
- Parents: Claude I de L'Aubespine, seigneur de La Corbillière (father); Marguerite Berruyer (mother)

Sébastien de L'Aubespine, abbot of Basse-Fontaine then bishop of Limoges (1518–1582) was a French noble, diplomat and political adviser during the latter Italian Wars and the early French Wars of Religion. Until 1558 he was known as the abbot of Basse-Fontaine, in that year he was elevated to the bishopric of Limoges. He began his career as a diplomat during the reign of François I, undertaking negotiations with the Protestant Schmalkaldic League in the hopes of prolonging their war with the Holy Roman Emperor, Charles V. The prospect of an alliance between the Protestant Imperial princes and the French crown was taken up again seriously in 1551 while Basse-Fontaine was serving as French ambassador to the Emperor in Brussels. A crisis between the governor of the Netherlands and the French admiral Annebault would lead to his recall as France and the Empire moved towards war. Having undertaken negotiations in the Swiss cantons, Basse-Fontaine would play an important role in the peace negotiations between France and the Empire in 1556 that produced the truce of Vaucelles. While the truce was in force he served as ambassador in Brussels again. With the attack of admiral Coligny into the Spanish-held Netherlands in 1557, Basse-Fontaine would be put under arrest, forcing him to be traded for the captive Spanish ambassador in France. Limoges would have a key role to play in the 1558–1559 negotiations that culminated in the peace of Cateau-Cambrésis which ended the Italian Wars. Involved in the discussions concerning the location and delegates for the peace, he also participated in the discussions, and was to transmit the king's order to withdraw from the peace before the monarch changed his mind. With the coming of peace he was established in Brussels for a third time.

Soon after the establishment of peace, Henri II died and was succeeded by his young son François II. Limoges (as he was now called) allied himself with the young king's maternal uncles during their administration. He relocated from Brussels to Madrid as the centre of Spanish politics shifted south and quickly built connections with the Spanish king Philip's new wife the French princess Élisabeth. He was tasked by the cardinal de Lorraine with broaching the possibility of a general church council with the Spanish, as an alternative to continued persecution. This greatly alarmed Philip and his government. Limoges was involved in negotiations with Philip for the French expedition into Scotland to fight the Lords of the Congregation. With the prospect of the king of Navarre and the prince de Condé's rebellion looming, Limoges secured Spanish assurances of military support, though it would not be required.

With the death of François II, and establishment of a new government led by the young Charles' mother Catherine, Limoges became a client of hers. He was tasked with explaining her religious policy of conciliation to Philip. He was further to frustrate the plans of the Lorraine-Guise family for a marriage between their niece and a Spanish prince which threatened Catherine. He was frequently tasked during 1561 with securing some form of compensation for the king of Navarre for his lost kingdom which was under Spanish occupation, but had only limited success. As 1561 wore on Philip and his councillors became increasingly belligerent to French religious policy, going so far as to threaten military intervention in favour of French Catholics. Limoges worked to reduce the tensions and get Philip to understand the French position. His efforts to secure a meeting between Catherine and Philip would be a failure. With the outbreak of the first French War of Religion in April 1562, Limoges was tasked with seeking Spanish military assistance for the royalists. In June 1562, he was recalled to France, and served Catherine as a close adviser, assisting her in the edict of Amboise which brought the first civil war to a close, then the treaty of Troyes that brought peace with England. He was again in the Swiss cantons seeking a reaffirmation and expansion of the Franco-Swiss alliance in 1564, before on his return to France working towards the peace of Longjumeau in 1568 which ended the second war of religion. Throughout this time he occupied the moderate wing of the royal council and was suspected of not being Catholic by the Spanish ambassador. In 1572, he aided in the negotiation of a defensive alliance with England through the treaty of Blois. In 1574, Charles died and was succeeded by his brother Henri III. Though initially a member of Henri's exclusive eight member conseil d'État, after his role in negotiating the generous Edict of Beaulieu in 1576 which brought the fifth war of religion to a close with many concessions to the rebels he was disgraced by the king, and spent the remainder of his life in retirement before dying in 1582.

== Early life and family ==
Sébastien de L'Aubespine was born in 1518, the youngest son of Claude I de L'Aubespine the seigneur de La Corbillière and Marguerite Berruyer. His father Claude was a bailli (baillif), in addition to being an échevin (alderman) of Orléans and possible a sécretaire du roi (secretary of the king). Sébastien was the younger brother of the sécretaire d'État (secretary of state) the baron de Châteauneuf who would enjoy a high profile career in royal service. According to Haan, Sébastien's brother was the only royal sécretaire who enjoyed a prominent political role in the administration.

=== L'Aubespine ===
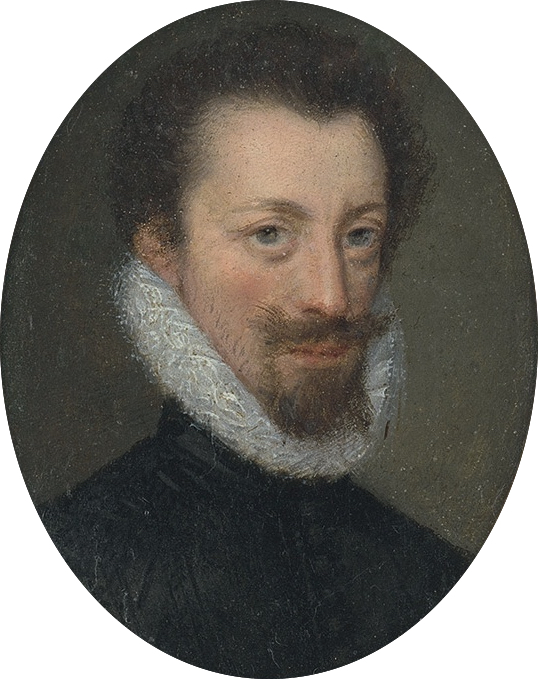
Baron de Châteauneuf brother of Limoges and a sécretaire d'État

The L'Aubespine family descended from merchants and lawyers of the Loire valley and Beauce. The family was one of the chief networks that dominated the royal secretariat from the reign of François I onwards.

Sébastien, alongside the bishop of Orléans would be one of the principal educators of the famous sécretaire d'État (secretary of state) Villeroy.

He would serve as a surintendant des finances (superintendent of the finances) for the French crown.

== Reign of François I ==
Starting in the 1540s, L'Aubespine was employed in diplomatic missions in the Holy Roman Empire and the Old Swiss Confederacy. He received the benefice of Basse-Fontaine of which he would be made abbot and by which he would be known until 1558 when he became the bishop of Limoges.

=== Diplomat among the Schmalkaldic League ===
After the signing of the Trêve de Crépy-en-Laonnois (treaty of Crépy-en-Laonnois), king François was at peace with the Emperor. After the death of his son the duc d'Orléans in September 1545 however, François lost the means by which Crépy was to grant him Milan. France undertook negotiations with the Imperial (meaning Holy Roman) alliance of Protestant princes known as the Schmalkaldic League. Basse-Fontaine was instructed in his engagements with the bund to 'proceed carefully' and not make any commitments for the French outside of those that might prolong the war between the bund and the Emperor.

In the negotiations he undertook alongside Jean de Fraisse among the princes, the king's son the dauphin was tabled as an alternative to the Emperor. The French king was elevated in the words of the envoys as a respecter of 'German liberties', in contrast to the domination imposed by the Emperor. However, it would only be in 1550 that talks between the French and the Protestant princes became serious.

== Reign of Henri II ==
In 1550, Basse-Fontaine was established as the resident French ambassador in the Imperial controlled Netherlands.

=== Resumption of the Italian Wars ===
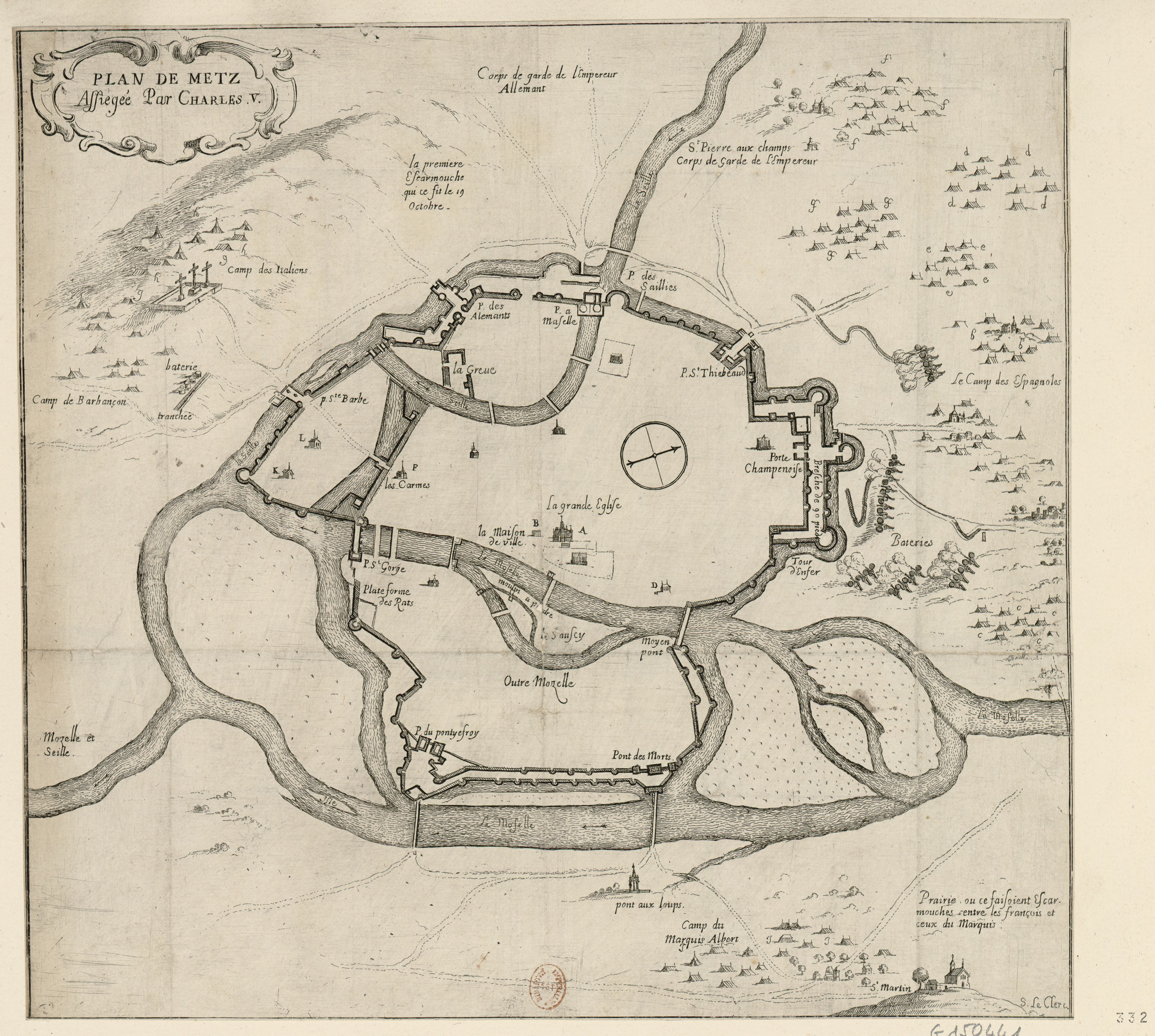
Imperial siege of Metz in 1552

Plans for the resumption of the Italian Wars through an alliance between the French king and several German princes were devised in 1551. As a reward for French support of the princes, Henri would be permitted to occupy the Trois-Évêchés (three bishoprics) of Metz, Toul and Verdun. The governor of the Netherlands became aware of the French preparations. At the same time as plans were underway as regarded the Trois-Évêchés, the situation between Imperial Netherlands and Normandy was deteriorating on the sea. Sensing king Henri's desire for a resumption of war admiral d'Annebault made preparations in the province over which he was lieutenant-general. In the Netherlands, the regent oversaw the blocking of French merchants from the territory and raised troops. Henri asked for an explanation of the measures she was undertaking and she replied that Annebault was doing such things in Normandy. Henri turned his ire on Annebault, either due to the admiral having operated too brazenly or too quickly. Annebault protested his innocence, arguing that he had always treated Imperial subjects in France as he would a Frenchman. Henri bought this defence. Bassefontaine attempted to sooth the regent, and she wrote to her ambassador in France that the French ambassador had made it clear to her that Henri had not ordered such an action to take place. In July 1551 Basse-Fontaine was recalled from his diplomatic residence in Brussels while the Imperial ambassador Simon Renard returned from Paris. War was declared on the Emperor in February 1552 and Metz was occupied by the French.

After the Imperial siege of Metz, Henri sought to secure more support from the Empire and his Swiss allies. He wished for more mercenaries from the territories for the next campaign. To this end Basse-Fontaine and the bishop of Bayonne were sent to Solothurn and Chur respectively. By this means it was hoped Henri's army would be swelled by Swiss mercenaries and German soldiers.

=== Truce of Vaucelles ===
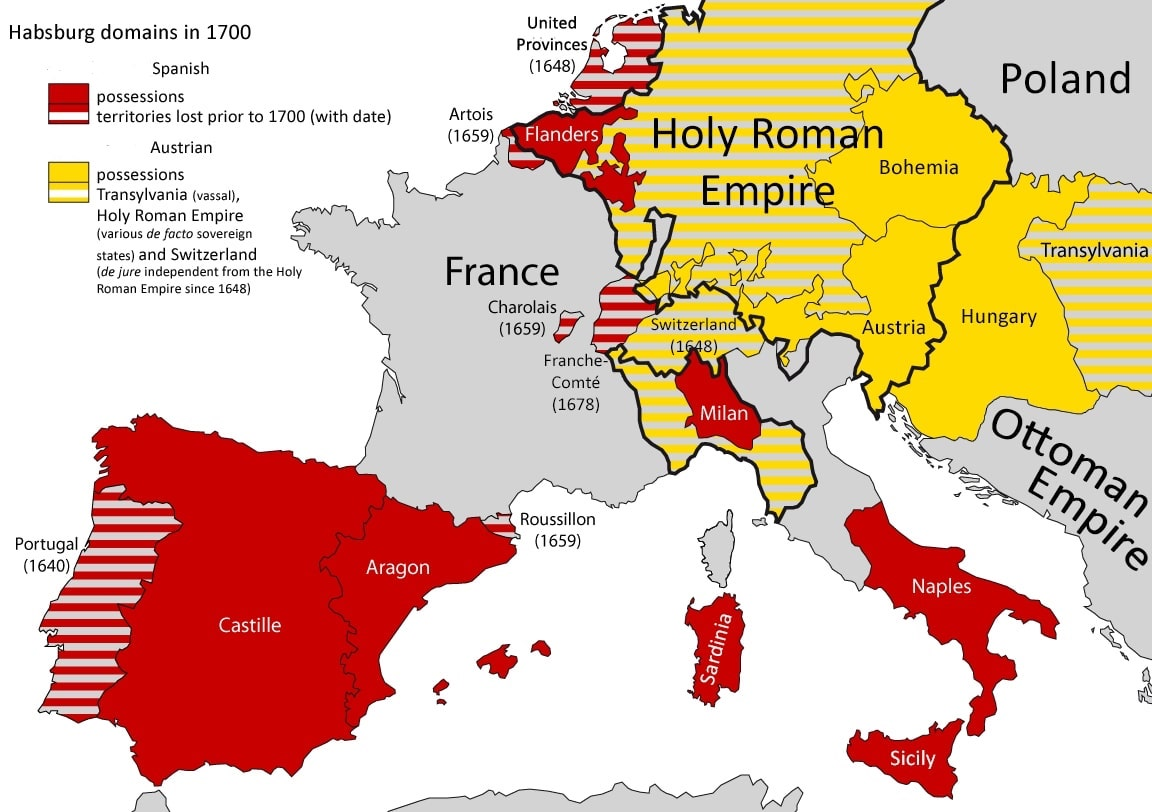
Division of the empire of the Holy Roman Emperor as he began the process of his abdications in 1556

By the mid 1550s, the Emperor had grown weary of war. The French king by contrast oscillated in disposition. On the one hand in December 1555 he yielded to the requests of the Lorraine-Guise faction at court and entered into alliance with the Pope for a planned assault against Imperial held Napoli. No sooner had this come to pass than he dispatched admiral de Coligny to negotiate either a peace or a truce with the Imperial party. Coligny, alongside Basse-Fontaine travelled to Vaucelles where they met with the representatives of the Emperor (the count of Lalaing and the former ambassador to France Simon Renard). The two sides discussed the handover of the various important prisoners in their possessions such as the duc de Bouillon who was held by the Imperials and the duke of Aarschot who was held by the French. Lalaing proposed the French trade their possession of Boulogne and Mariembourg for the release of the comte de Dammartin (son of the Constable of France) and the duc de Bouillon. Henri remarked acidly to the proposal that the constable de Montmorency was not the king of France. Coligny and Basse-Fontaine refused to assent to territorial concessions requested by the Imperial negotiators. Negotiations proceeded rapidly, in part because the Emperor was keen for a pause so that he could effect his staggered abdications. Thus they succeeded in February in establishing a truce with the Emperor. The truce would allow both sides the time to raise the funds to redeem their various captives from the other side. When word of the truce reached the war party in France it was greeted with horror and disgust. Of the two contradictory agreements the French king had established in these months, the truce of Vaucelles was the better received by the people of France.

With the signing of the truce, Basse-Fontaine was re-established as the French ambassador in the (now) Spanish Netherlands at Brussels and Renard was re-established as the Spanish ambassador in France.

Cardenal Granvelle argued that the prisoners the Imperials held were hostages for the observance of the truce. However, further discussions with Renard established ransoms for many of the prisoners. While the French court was staying in Châtillon, Basse-Fontaine informed the king that he had succeeded in securing from the Spanish king Philip the establishment of a ransom for d'Andelot, nephew of the Constable. D'Andelot was thus able to return to France in July 1558.

=== Collapse of Vaucelles ===
A raid into the Spanish Netherlands by admiral Coligny was authorised by Henri II. After failing to capture Douai on 6 January 1557, the Admiral stormed Lens. Henri became keen however that the blame for the resumption of hostilities not be blamed on him and ordered his commander to return the loot he had seized. This desire to avoid blame would not succeed, and his ambassador Basse-Fontaine found himself put under house arrest in Brussels. The French responded by putting the Spanish ambassador Simon Renard under house arrest in Paris. On 31 January 1557, Henri declared formal war on Spain after a month of reassuring England and the Holy Roman Empire that he did not intend to void the truce of Vaucelles. Coligny oversaw the transfer of the two countries ambassadors back to their native lands. This was a sensitive task and he succeeded in ensuring Basse-Fontaine and Renard crossed the borders back to their respective countries in a synchronised fashion (with each slowing upon the delay of the other to this end). The handover occurred in Péronne under the auspices of the governor of the city the seigneur d'Humières.

As a reward for his diplomatic services Basse-Fontaine was established as the bishop of Limoges in 1558.

=== Final peace ===
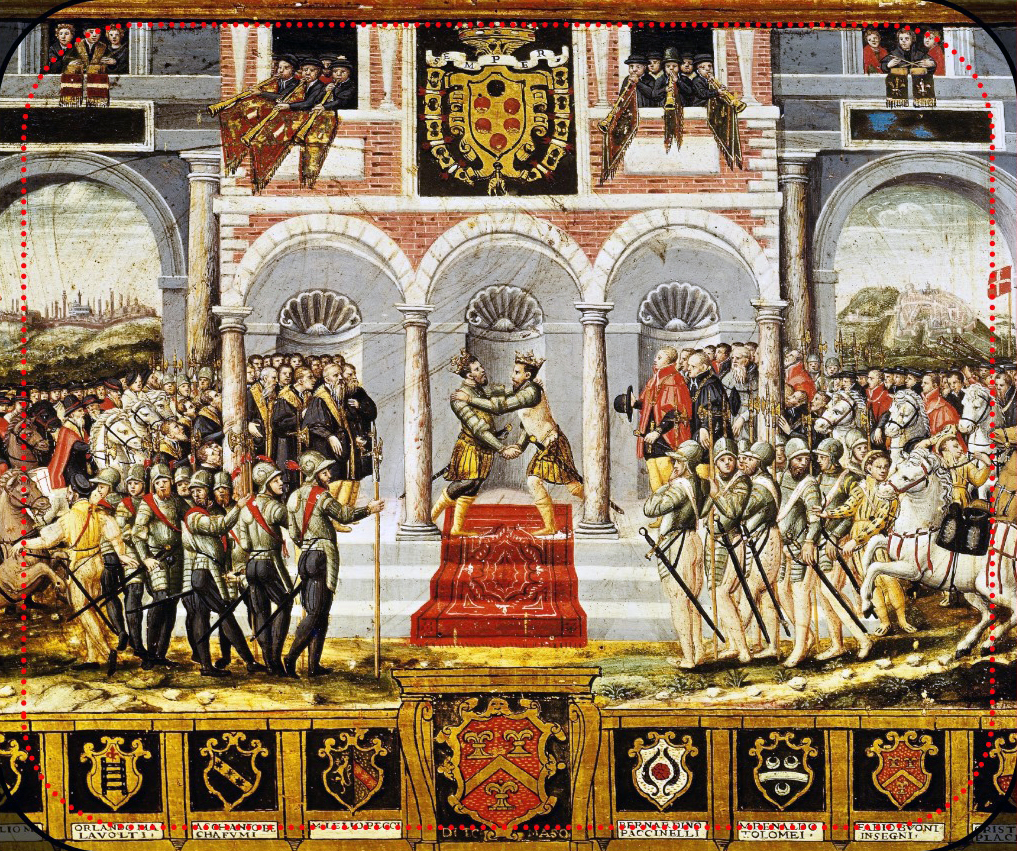
Henri II and Philip II embrace at the signing of the peace of Cateau-Cambrésis

With constable de Montmorency in captivity, Henri increasingly lost patience with the war party at the French court, as embodied by the duc de Guise. He wrote to Montmorency of his desires for a 'good peace' and the ransoming of his favourite. On 1 October 1558, Henri entrusted the new bishop of Limoges with reaching out to the prince of Éboli in Doullens to establish a location and time for a peace conference. He was also to communicate to the Spanish the French plenipotentiaries for the negotiations. This done, Henri turned himself to the matter of delegates for the negotiations, selecting the marshal de Saint-André and Montmorency, both of whom were Spanish captives. Limoges declared to the Spanish that if the duke of Savoy was selected as a Spanish plenipotentiary, Henri would dispatch both the cardinal de Lorraine and duc de Guise. Little interested in meeting with the duc de Guise, the duke of Savoy was removed as a plenipotentiary for the Spanish side. The peace conference would begin at Cercamp on 12 October. Limoges acted as a courier for the negotiations between Cercamp and the French court while his brother served as one of the plenipotentiaries. The French agreed to withdraw from their conquests in the Netherlands, and some of their Italian conquests. Montmorency was little inclined to see Piedmont lost to the French and argued with the duke of Alba on this point, but the cardinal de Lorraine indicated a French willingness to yield on this point.

Nevertheless the talks deadlocked. The Spanish demanding the withdrawal of the French from Luxembourg, Calais, the entirety of Piedmont and Savoy, Montferrat and Corsica. If the French could not meet all of these demands there was no basis for continuing the negotiations. It seemed by the end of 13 November that war would resume and Limoges hurried from Cercamp to inform the king of the collapse of the negotiations and to ask him how to proceed. Henri informed him on the evening of 14 November to return to Cercamp with orders for the French plenipotentiaries to break off the negotiations. That night both Henri and his mistress Diane received letters from the captive Montmorency. Montmorency begged Diane to convince her lover to take the peace that the Spanish were offering.

As such the king had a change of mind on 15 November on the volume of concessions he was prepared to make and subsequently dispatched the seigneur de Saint-Sulpice to override Limoges' instructions on 15 November. Limoges would be involved in the subsequent negotiations alongside his brother the baron de Châteauneuf, the bishop of Orléans and the court grandees: constable de Montmorency, marshal de Saint-André and the cardinal de Lorraine. With the talks no longer at Cercamp, but rather at Cateau-Cambrésis, Limoges, his elder brother and Orléans returned to the conference on 20 January. Peace would thus be concluded between Spain and France on 2 April 1559 in the treaty of Cateau-Cambrésis.

The treaty, which surrendered the claims to territory that France had made for 70 years represented a complete reorientation in the king's priorities towards a new ambition for the internal reform of the kingdom and the destruction of Protestantism.

=== Ambassador to Spain ===
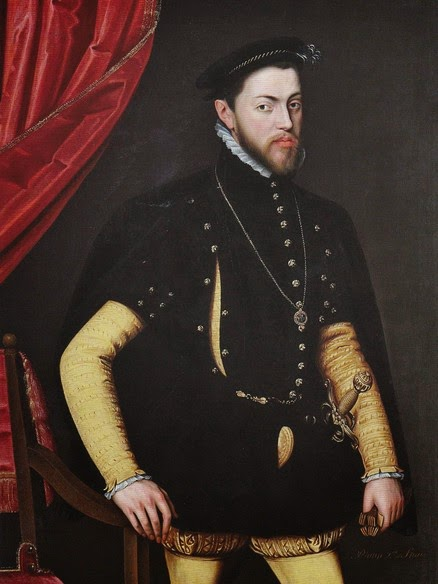
Philip II, king of Spain

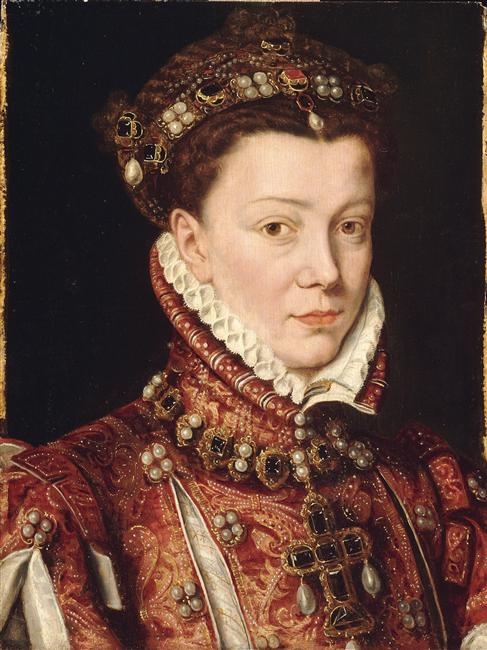
Élisabeth, queen of Spain and daughter of Catherine

After the coming of peace, Limoges remained with the Spanish court, established once more as permanent ambassador to Spain. He enjoyed a status as a man of 'great reputation full of worthy qualities' according to an assessment given to the Pope. He would no longer be based out of Brussels, and the French abolished their diplomatic office in the territory from 1560 to 1562 on the understanding decision making had moved from their to Spain. In that year however it would be re-established as Dutch affairs climbed in importance once more.

Cloulas characterises the ambassadorships of Limoges and his successors Saint-Sulpice and the baron de Fourquevaux to Spain as operating with timidity in comparison to their Spanish counterparts of the period Thomas Perennot de Granvelle (known as Chantonnay) and Álava. The three French ambassadors were selected for their experience, all being over 40 at the time of their appointment. In terms of surviving correspondence, the French ambassadors of this time would receive a higher degree of contact from the French queen (then from July 1559 queen mother) Catherine than the Spanish ambassadors would receive from Philip.

During his residency, Limoges would complain to the cardinal de Lorraine in August 1560 that he had to shoulder all the costs of his mission for that year, without the king compensating him a single écu (crown).

As ambassador to Spain, Limoges was in the département of the sécretaire d'État the seigneur de Fresne. As such Fresne wrote the despatches to Limoges. However, beginning in March 1560, Limoges started communicating with Catherine. From 1561, the queen mother also maintained a second secret line if correspondence with Limoges through the ambassador's brother the baron de Châteauneuf. This was despite the fact that Châteauneuf's international département comprised Savoy, the Empire and the Swiss territories. The reason to circumvent Fresne in this matter was the need to conduct the discussions through the sécretaire she trusted the most. These letters were not to be sent via the postal service lest they end up in Fresne's hands, but rather dispatched via express courier. In this correspondence Catherine confided the political difficulties she was experiencing, in particular those related to the Lorraine-Guise family. Limoges would be Catherine's eighth most corresponded with ambassador after 1559, receiving 64 letters from the queen mother, an average of one every twelve days. For his part, Limoges submitted 72 despatches during his residency in Spain for Catherine's attentions. Limoges would obscure the letters he wrote to Catherine (to make them less of interest were his courier ever intercepted) by addressing them to an imaginary man named monsieur de Rocquerolles. Not all diplomatic correspondence between the ambassador and the French court would be communicated in writing, and in this the courier played a role, with Limoges making use of the sieur de Lutaines. Catherine justified her political role to Limoges in December 1560 as coming from 'a mother thoughtful of the benefit of her child'.

In his residency in Madrid he quickly formed a rapport with the new queen of Spain, the daughter of Catherine, Élisabeth. She was only fourteen years old upon her arrival in Spain in the first days of 1560 and Limoges undertook to support her political education. It would be a priority of both Limoges and Élisabeth's mother Catherine to ensure the new queen was well integrated into the Spanish court, and in Philip's good graces. To this end in June 1560 and then in Spring 1561 the pair oversaw the dismissing of many of her French courtiers. Her lady in waiting was dismissed by agreement of the French and Spanish governments, the latter of whom opined that madame de Clermont's presence was an obstacle to her acclimatisation to Spain. Limoges wrote flatteringly in May 1560 that the queen understood the customs of the Spanish court so well her servants had nothing to teach her, and then again in December that her command of the Spanish language was already 'perfect'. In Limoges' efforts to secure the friendship of Philip he would be supported by Élisabeth. Élisabeth would serve as an intermediary between the French ambassadors and her husband in the coming years.

=== Final days of Henri II ===
With Henri's new passion for religious affairs, the prospect of a Savoyard invasion of Genève came to the fore. Lorraine proposed to Philip that the Spanish king lend his troops to the duke of Savoy towards this end, informing the sovereign his forces would be matched by French soldiers towards this end. Limoges worked on the Spanish king to this same end. However, Philip felt the newfound religious zeal Henri was experiencing was excessive and was less willing to override his own strategic interests for religious goals.

Mortally wounded, Henri slipped towards death in early July. On 8 July, his doctors despaired in his condition. Henri had his eldest son the dauphin (heir to the throne) write to Limoges to secure Philip's assurance of protection for the future king and the French people. Romier characterises this as an act of naïveté that legitimised future Spanish intrigues in internal French affairs. On 10 July 1559, the king received extreme unction, and that same day he died.

== Reign of François II ==
With the death of Henri II, his young son François II succeeded to the throne. François was 15 years old and was easily dominated by his wife's uncles the duc de Guise and the cardinal de Lorraine. Rumours swirled that the constable de Montmorency was to be disgraced by the new government. This would indeed by one of the Lorraine administrations first acts. A day after the death of the king, the baron de Châteauneuf, Limoges' brother came to Montmorency to ask him to surrender the royal seals.

Limoges made assurances of his loyalty to the new Lorraine government.

=== Termination of persecution? ===
While in Ghent in July 1559, Limoges wrote to the French court of the reaction of Philip to the tolerant policy towards Protestants that was presently in force in Scotland. Philip warned that they would regret this state of affairs if it was not resolved.

By the start of 1560, it was clear to the Lorraine administration that the policy of repression against the Protestants had failed. Therefore the cardinal de Lorraine began to look to the possibility of a general church council, including the participation of the German Protestants. Recognising this might be a hard sell with Philip and the Pope, the threat that a national church council may be used to resolve the religious question was presented as the alternative. In January, Lorraine asked Limoges to probe Philip's feelings on the prospect in the hope that he would be similarly open to the idea. Philip instead sent an extraordinary ambassador to France in the hopes of reducing the governments passion for the project.

After the conspiracy of Amboise, Limoges advocated to the Spanish duke of Alba that the French court be relocated to somewhere with proximity to the Spanish border.

There was great alarm in the Spanish court that France was moving in the direction of toleration, and Philip sought to reverse this course back to a repressive policy. In May, Limoges proposed that François and Philip make a joint request for a council to the Pope. Philip instead began direct negotiations with the Pope himself and agreed in June to an ecumenical council, but only if it firmly condemned 'heresy'. In July, Lorraine complained to Limoges about how counterproductive the attitude of Spain was towards a general council that could realistically solve the churches schism. The cardinal also complained to the Pope about his attitude.

The Spanish suffered military defeat at the battle of Djerba in May 1560, and several prominent nobles were made prisoner. After this episode, at the instigation of the Spanish queen Élisabeth, Limoges offered French diplomatic support for securing their release. He did this without formal orders from the French court as a manifestation of French friendship. Philip asked for French support with several other captives also. However, when the captives were finally released in 1562, it would be as a result of Imperial diplomacy as opposed to French diplomacy.

Limoges surmised the Spanish position to the new French religious policy as a product of domestic and international fear. He argued that for the Spanish the French policy was designed to destabilise the religious situation in the Netherlands', 'form bonds with German princes' and damage the alliance between Spain and England.

=== Scottish expedition ===
Hoping to better dispose the Spanish king to favour the French in the crisis between France and England, the prince de La Roche-sur-Yon was dispatched to Spain to award Philip the collier (collar) of the Ordre de Saint-Michel (Order of Saint-Michel). By this means it was hoped that Philip would pay more heed to the positions advocated for by Limoges. Limoges for his part was largely dealing with the duke of Alba who opined that Philip understood the English queen Elizabeth's concerns, and that the French naval preparations were troubling affairs in the Spanish Netherlands also. Limoges advised the French court that Philip would likely be amenable to a French attack against the rebel Protestant Lords of the Congregation in Scotland if the force used to achieve it was not of an overwhelming size. By March 1560, Philip had resolved that a joint Franco-Spanish army would be created to destroy the Lords of the Congregation comprising at most 7,000 soldiers (4,000 French and 3,000 Spanish). These troops would be transported to Scotland by Spanish ships from the Netherlands. By this means it could be ensured nothing further than defeating the Lords was undertaken. The Lorraine government approved of the plan. However, Limoges noted after an interview with Alba that it appeared there was reluctance from the Spanish. Durot opines that it is likely Philip hoped the announcement of the plan could substitute for the need to execute it. France would be compelled to limit themselves to Philip's envisioned intervention, while England would be pushed to cease their support for the Lords. The English council was however unconvinced at the project.

Peace would be reached with England by the July Treaty of Edinburgh which was de facto complied with by the French. Soldiers returned back to France from Scotland with only two French garrisons left in Scotland. Limoges was informed of what was to be done with the galley fleet of the grand prieur which had been on its way north.

In September, Philip dispatched a representative to François in the hopes of convincing him to resume a policy of repression towards Protestantism. He received warm assurances, but neither side backed down from their positions. In November, the Pope declared the upcoming convention of the council of Trent. The lack of specific information on its form left both Philip and François dissatisfied.

=== Rebel princes ===
With disorders and conspiracies multiplying across France in the wake of the failed conspiracy of Amboise back in March, the king of Navarre and prince de Condé were summoned to present themselves to the king. The crown suspected the latter of involvement both in the conspiracy of Amboise and the more recent plans for an uprising. François opined to Limoges that if Navarre approached him as a rebel that he would impress upon the prince that he was the king and make himself obeyed. To combat the possibility of rebellion, the royal army was distributed across the provinces of the kingdom. Philip offered to provide his soldiers as support to the French crown. Nevertheless he found himself irritated by Limoges, who repeatedly solicited him to this effect, asking how many troops he would be providing. Philip eventually resolved on 6,000 men half of whom would be raised from the Netherlands and the other half from Spain. However, Condé presented himself at the French court on 29 October and thus the troops were not necessary.

== Reign of Charles IX ==
=== Rise of Catherine ===
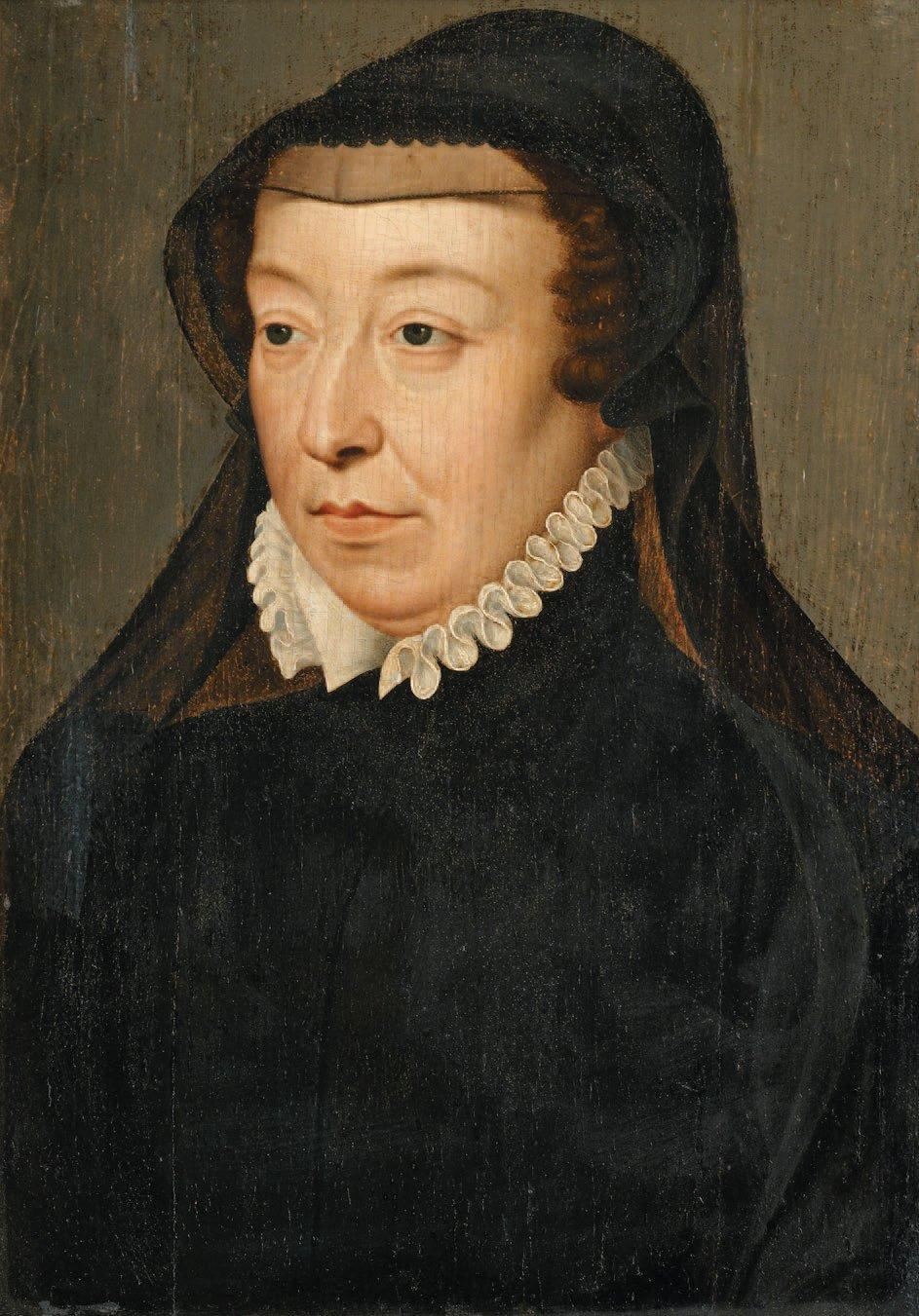
Queen Mother Catherine wife of Henri II, mother of three French kings and from the reign of Charles IX, the patron of Limoges

With the death of François II and ascent of his brother Charles IX, Limoges swore himself to the service of the queen mother Catherine. Limoges enjoyed great confidence from Catherine. He was little troubled by the disgrace of his patrons Lorraine and Guise as he transitioned into Catherine's service. To this end he assured her he would work to confound the ambitions of his former patrons, the Lorraine-Guise. As such he worked on the sécretaire of the Spanish queen, named Jacques L'Huilier, formerly a servant of the duc de Guise to bring him into Catherine's service.

On 19 December 1560, Catherine informed Limoges that the king of Navarre was subject to her authority. She also confided her fears of the situation at court, where the sudden change in government had left many grandees, particularly those who had enjoyed pre-eminence in the prior reign, with worse fortunes. Catherine feared the Lorraine brothers would not easily tolerate the new state of affairs.

Limoges wrote of Philip's concern when he learned of the death of François II at the prospect of a new direction for French policy.

The ambassador bemoaned to Catherine on 14 January that the Spanish court was intimately familiar with French affairs 'almost by the minute'.

=== Religious policy ===
On 31 January 1561, shortly after the closing of the Estates General of Orléans, Catherine wrote to Limoges to outline her understanding of government and religious policy. According to Catherine, the cure to the ailments of state must be adapted to its circumstances. The attempt over the last 20–30 years to bring about the crushing of Protestantism had only seen it grow stronger, and caused troubles in the kingdom which could easily be set off again. Therefore, at the advice of her council (including the princes du sang and other seigneurs), she intended to follow the path of 'gentleness', restricting punishment to those who caused seditions. It was key for Catherine that her policy was seen to emanate from the will of the royal council and the Catholic lords on it. Limoges was to assure Philip that despite this policy of softness, Catherine was determined to remain true to the religion and maintain the French kingdom in peace until such time a church council could resolve matters.

Limoges brother bemoaned to him that Catherine suffered from being little obeyed and had little room to manoeuvre without displeasing someone.

It would be necessary at some point for Philip to visit his northern territory of Aragón as he had not done so since the start of his reign in 1556. It was hoped that through this proximity to the French frontier, an interview could be conducted between the French and Spanish crowns. In January 1561, Philip informed Limoges concerning the project that while he certainly desired to meet with Charles and Catherine at some point it should not be rushed.

=== Navarrese crisis ===
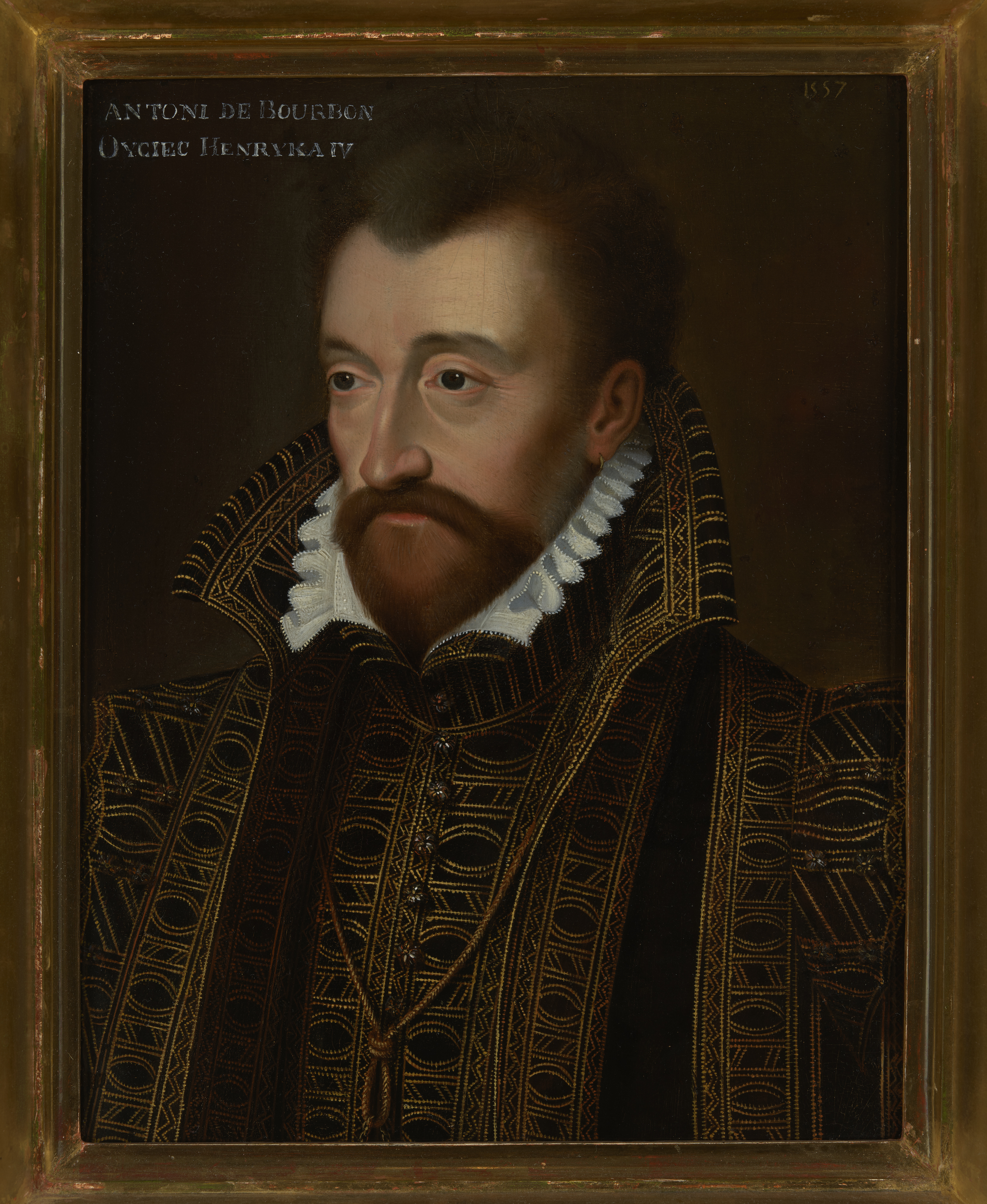
King of Navarre whose territorial satisfaction would be a major issue of Franco-Spanish diplomacy during Limoges' tenure in Spain

At the end of February a new political crisis rocked France. Navarre, who had renounced his rights to the regency was dissatisfied at his lack of political influence. He felt that little had been done to secure for him the restitution of Spanish held Navarre. Limoges had explored the prospect of such a concession at the Spanish court, but seeing little prospect of it had decided to let the matter rest. Thus lacking the main compensation that he felt was owed to him he instigated a crisis, demanding the disgrace from court of the duc de Guise with the alternative being his departure from court, which would have meant going into rebellion. Fresne wrote to Limoges that civil war seemed imminent. In addition to this, Navarre demanded the royal seals be given to him, thereby allowing his direct involvement in the external affairs of the crown. It was key to appraise Limoges of these developments so that he might downplay their seriousness in the Spanish court. By March Navarre and Guise had been reconciled, however Condé remained at odds with Guise.

During March, Catherine encouraged Limoges to impede the Lorraine-Guise families' plans to see a marriage between their widowed niece Mary and the son of the Spanish king the prince of Asturias (prince of Asturias). Limoges was to instead seek the prince's hand for Catherine's daughter Marguerite. If Limoges became aware of any activity by the Lorraine-Guise family in Spain, he was to appraise both Catherine and his brother Châteauneuf.

Limoges also received correspondence in March asking him to explain to Catherine's daughter Élisabeth the reasons why it was necessary to equivocate on religious matters. Catherine highlighted that there was no practical path to religious unity in the kingdom. She expressed her great regret at the state of affairs, but argued that to achieve what Philip envisioned would have necessitated torching the kingdom down to ashes. It was hoped Élisabeth would have an easier time convincing her husband Philip that French internal religious policy must be led at Catherine's discretion.

On 25 March, Navarre received a major political concession from Catherine when he was established as the lieutenant-general of the kingdom, giving him full control over the royal army. In return for this concession, Limoges was informed that Navarre had renounced his right to the regency, leaving Catherine in supreme command of the state.

The divergence between Limoges' standard correspondence and his secret correspondence was most dramatically shown on 27 March 1561. In the official despatch Catherine praised the king of Navarre, demonstrating her gratitude to him and instructing Limoges to intervene with Philip to see the king received recompensate for the parts of Navarre under Spanish control. This letter would have been shown to Navarre to prove Catherine's support for his projects and aid her in negotiations with the prince. In her secret correspondence of the same despatch, Catherine described her conflicts with Navarre and informed Limoges not to seek out any compensation for him. Fresne explained to Limoges that the letter which had been shown to the king of Navarre should be answered by Limoges in his letter to the king, as this one would be shown to Navarre, while the other letters he had received in the despatch should be responded to separately.

On 4 April, Limoges wrote secretly to the king of Spain. In this correspondence he detailed the troubles in France and thanked Philip in Catherine's name for the actions his ambassador Chantonnay was undertaking.

Spanish opinion of French policy was further tested by the entry into the royal council of the leading Protestant grandees (Coligny, Condé and the cardinal de Châtillon). The Spanish ambassador in France demanded an end to Protestant preaching at the French court and the dismissal of Coligny and Châtillon. Philip grilled Limoges on this state of affairs in his audiences with the ambassador. The Spanish king further made it clear that there could be no question of the French king holding a national council.

=== The Question of the kingdom of Navarre ===
As early as 1560, Navarre had received a major boon to his cause of seeking restitution for his occupied lands when the Pope received Pierre d'Albret as ambassador for the king of Navarre on 14 December. Seeing it as a useful means to anchor Navarre's Catholicism, Papal diplomacy supported French diplomacy towards receipt of compensation. In April, Catherine requested of Philip via Limoges that the king provide some 'small scrap of territory' to Navarre as through his satisfaction there would be great benefits to the religion and internal peace in France. She further asked Limoges to gain an interview between her and Philip to the end of territorially satisfying the king of Navarre. In mid 1561, Limoges again opined to Catherine that his negotiations with the Spanish court had borne no fruit, and it would be better to let the matter rest. This had been made clear to him by the prince of Éboli. Catherine could not however follow Limoges' proposed course of action, and suggested the Spanish provide Navarre with Sardinia or Mallorca as an alternative compensation, but this was not taken seriously. In mid June however, Spanish policy shifted, seeing Navarre instead as a potential ally against French royal policy. The Spanish ambassador Chantonnay began assiduously frequenting him. The French crown for its part decided it would get the sieur d'Auzances to petition Philip in favour of receiving a Navarrese representative in his court. Both Auzances and Limoges were given instructions that warned the Spanish sovereign of the fickleness of fortune and dangers of war.

=== Franco-Spanish crisis ===
With tensions between France and Spain ratcheting up, Limoges reassured the French court during July. He explained Philip's unrivalled position, with most other Christian princes being minors or women. Due to this, Limoges believed, those around Philip sought to have him dictate the behaviour of other Christian princes. Nevertheless Philip remained committed to peace, and only a provocation or a Protestant victory would drive him to arms.

Limoges' brother the baron de Châteauneuf informed him during August of the formation of a Catholic opposition to French royal policy in France. The duc de Guise and Montmorency leading this opposition attempted to frighten the French king and were supported in this by Chantonnay who complained about French royal policy. Limoges was informed that Montmorency and Guise had appeared before the queen at midnight to observe the kingdom was in danger of being torn in two and that the Catholics were arming. Châteauneuf was outraged at how Catherine had been treated by the Spanish ambassador. He put little stock in the reconciliation between Condé and Guise which was nominally achieved in August.

By September, Spain had received word of several developments in France: the edict of July, the Colloquy of Poissy and new demands of the king of Navarre. Limoges observed Philip and his ministers were combative at the prospect of Auzances arrival at the Spanish court. He wrote to the French court on 5 September that the '[Spanish] have the opinion, I don't know why, that [the French] want to scare them'.

With the arrival of Auzances at the Spanish court, Philip resolved that it was time to bring pressure to bear on the French crown. A message akin to an ultimatum was given to Limoges which combined offers of assistance with threats. Catherine was exhorted to abandon her 'mask' of temporary accord with the Protestants and look to the true remedy to Protestantism, punishment of heretics and the dispatching of a French delegation to the council of Trent. If French policy did not become more intolerant towards Protestantism, Philip raised the spectre of the intervention in France of the duke of Alba in favour of the Catholics of France. Catherine and Limoges would spend the next several months trying to defuse this threatening policy. On the matter of Navarre however, Spanish policy continued in its new approach. Philip agreed to receive a representative of the king of Navarre, and provide compensation to the king of Navarre if he demonstrated his Catholicity. In return for compensation, Navarre would be expected to abolish Protestant worship and see French Catholics restored to all their churches. Limoges tried to convince Philip unsuccessfully that such a return to the situation in 1559 was no longer practical. Nevertheless Limoges for the first time held hope of a positive conclusion to the matter.

During October, an attempt was undertaken to kidnap from the court the king's brother the duc d'Orléans. Catherine saw this as a useful scenario to gauge Philip's intentions, and asked the Spanish king for his advice in the situation, seeking his condemnation of the kidnapping. Philip instead responded that persecuted Catholics needed a refuge, and would find it in Spanish territories. In response to this flagrant disregard for the situation, Catherine through Charles communicated to Limoges in December that it was not Philip's business to meddle in French affairs nor was it appropriate for subjects of a crown upon receiving reasonable requests from their king to look elsewhere for support.

Auzances and Limoges protested to Philip on that Protestantism was by this point a 'necessary evil' in France as the alternative to its accommodation was to plunge the kingdom into civil war. As proof of this they highlighted the deliberations of the various assemblies of the prior year. Philip was assured Protestant worship would never be abided at the court or in Paris. He was further reassured that Navarre and Catherine were not interested in any further growth of Protestantism. Philip was urged not to treat France with anger, but rather offer his 'advice and comfort'.

In November 1561, Limoges was appraised by Catherine of two French merchants of the town of Croisic who while conducting trade in Sevilla had been imprisoned by the Spanish authorities on account of their Protestantism. The imprisoned merchants were condemned to service on the galleys by the Spanish inquisition. Limoges plead their case in April 1562, but it was without result and his replacement as ambassador would be asked to continue championing their cause in December 1563.

Both the duke of Alba and the prince of Éboli assured Limoges in December the offer to Navarre of compensation was a true royal commitment. As a result, Limoges urged Navarre to make such a sign of his religion. Nevertheless the promise to Navarre remained vague in its specifics. The ambassador warned Navarre that there may be deceptions at play by the Spanish. Nevertheless he wrote that never before had the Navarrese king been so close to achieving his goal of compensation. After having received these assurances from Limoges, Navarre swung dramatically towards the ultra Catholic party at court and the Spanish.

Limoges observed that a more profitable strategy for French relations with Spain came through the assurance of France's peaceable intentions. Advised of this Catherine sent Auzances back to the Spanish court in December. He assured the Spanish crown that there were no diplomatic or military moves towards war being undertaken by France, and that Catherine simply desired the unification of her subjects. While members of Philip's council urged him to make a show of force in favour of French Catholics, Philip reaffirmed his friendship for the French crown. Limoges understood that Philip agreed to moderate his opposition to French religious policy, however he made it clear that French relations with other European states would be monitored for any signs of hostility. No hostility was tolerable. Catherine for her part justified her religious policy, but refused to bring about a civil war through a turn to repression.

On 20 December, Limoges announced to the Spanish court that there were plans underway to allow Protestant worship on the outskirts of some towns. This would be embodied in the Edict of Saint-Germain in January 1562.

In the dying days of 1561, the sieur de Rambouillet (an agent of the king of Navarre's) was dispatched into the Empire to reassure the Lutheran princes as to the cause of France's participation in the council of Trent. During his time in the Empire, he mentioned Philip's continual attempts to involve himself in attacks against Protestants. By February 1562, it was reported to Philip the French mission had informed those it contacted that Philip intended to declare war on Charles and the German Protestant princes in league with the Pope and Emperor. Philip protested in scarcely any time at all, more damage had been done than the French crown could build in a hundred years. Catherine was asked to make amends. Rambouillet was thus sent to Spain to explain himself. This unusual move was justified to Limoges on the grounds of the 'friendship between the princes'.

Only a few days into the new year, Coligny wrote to Limoges seeking restitution from the Spanish king for the plundering by the Spanish of a ship that he and Catherine had tasked with going to Algiers. Coligny denied to the ambassador that his actions were driven bya desire for revenge for the captivity he had experienced after the battle of Saint-Quentin in 1557. Catherine tasked Limoges with remonstrating with the Spanish king against the image of Coligny as having engaged in illegal maritime activities. Philip was to gain an understanding that Coligny was a good servant of the crown who held a zeal for peace. Philip was unconvinced and opined to Chantonnay disapprovingly about Catherine allowing a Protestant like Coligny on the royal council.

=== Fall into civil war ===
In January and February 1562, Limoges was of the opinion Philip was eager to maintain peace and avoid civil war in France. He sought to attain clarity from the Spanish on their position towards French Catholics, hoping to achieve a policy of minimal intervention. To this end he debated with Chantonnay remotely through the conduit of Catherine. He understood Chantonnay to be courting the French Catholics against the will of Philip. For Limoges, Spanish aid was only to be given if it was requested. In response to this, Chantonnay opined that Limoges and Auzances did not understand Spanish very well. The French would be obliged to accept increased diplomatic interventionism from the Spanish for the sake of preserving the friendship between the kingdoms.

Despite his reputation as a moderate, at this time Limoges was urging Catherine to take a position more advantageous to the Catholic cause so that divisions in the kingdom might be mended.

For Philip, the fact that Catherine had ignored his warnings so thoroughly meant he maintained his pressure on the French crown. He was outraged at the edict of Saint-Germain, but ultimately felt it was not liable to be applied any more on the ground that prior edicts had been. Haan sees his reaction as more moderated than that against the edict of July. Chantonnay continued to demand the dismissal of Condé and Coligny from the royal council, and the sending of French delegates to the council of Trent. Catherine was scandalised by a new line of attack from the Spanish, querying the orthodoxy of her children's surrounds and education. Despite the diplomatic pressure he was applying, the Spanish king remained appreciative of the assurances he had received through Limoges of Catherine's friendship.

On 20 January, Limoges complained to Catherine that in Spain there were no Frenchman who were free from being monitored as to their religious character by the Inquisition.

By early 1562, Limoges had come to see the offers given to Navarre of compensatory territory as disingenuous: the prospect of becoming king of Sardinia dangled before him without any path to how this was to come to pass. In March, he wrote that for the Spanish crown there was 'great fear' Navarre may impose himself on the kingdom towards the pursuit of his interests. More preferable for the Spanish would be for a few Catholic lords to have pre-eminence. On 16 March, the duc de Guise returned to Paris and reunited with the other members of the ultra-Catholic Triumvirate. After two weeks of resistance from Catherine, they assumed control of the state, a triumph for Chantonnay and Philip's policy. Soon after however, the taking up of arms frustrated the victory.

Philip was to be in Aragon for the meeting of the Cortes in early 1562. Limoges made appeals to him to meet with Catherine during this time. Philip assured Limoges that after he had attended to the Cortes he would happily meet with the queen mother. He expressed to Limoges his desire to impress upon Catherine the importance of the preservation of Catholicism during such a meeting. In the event however, domestic French political developments and the cancellation of Philip's planned visit to Aragón postponed the plan.

=== First French War of Religion ===
After the outbreak of the first French War of Religion, Catherine wrote to Limoges instructing him to encode sensitive matters in his correspondence, due to the 'troubles of the time' which made the risks of interception a pressing concern.

With open conflict between the Protestant rebel prince Condé and the crown looming, frantic negotiations were conducted between the royalists and the rebels who had seized Orléans so as to avoid open fighting. The sécretaires d'État who were all involved in the various peace efforts wrote to Limoges of their fears. Fresne confided in Limoges because he knew that he could trust him to keep the observations to himself that he saw little prospect of either side backing down. Alluye opined that Limoges was fortunate to be far away from it all, and that there was no ground for agreement. Limoges' brother argued to the ambassador that even Condé and Coligny could not control the anger of the people.

With negotiations a failure, and conflict between the crown and Protestant rebels, Philip made clear to Limoges that he was willing to offer his support against the Protestants. After hoping to avoid the eventuality for a little while, Catherine made a request of the Spanish crown for troops on 7 May. The breakdown of the various forces she requested of the Spanish king was communicated to Limoges with the ambassador to request 10,000 infantry and 3,000 cavalry.

On 18 May, Limoges was informed that Catherine was seeking the mutual disarmament of Condé, Guise and Montmorency. Châteauneuf held little faith in this coming to pass and feared the ruin of the kingdom was to follow.

Navarre, now committed to the Catholic royalist cause pressurised Philip to live up to the agreement the two made for his territorial satisfaction. The Spanish ambassador Chantonnay warned Philip in May that there was a possibility of Navarre defecting to the rebel side if he were not satisfied. Limoges denounced the fact that for several months the Spanish court prevaricated on making any firm commitment to Navarre. Finally in June, the Spanish proposed that the kingdom of Tunis would be conquered as Navarre's compensation, and until such time as that transpired he could receive the kingdom of Sardinia on a temporary basis.

Limoges' diplomatic residence in Spain ended in June 1562 and he was recalled in favour of the seigneur de Saint-Sulpice who had taken up his residency in May, with a brief period of overlap with Limoges. Both Limoges and Saint-Sulpice were to address a speech from Catherine to her daughter Élisabeth in June, at which the queen's 'preordained and elected' role to ensure harmony between France and Spain was emphasised.

From the recall of Limoges to the French court to the establishment of peace, Sutherland argues that both Limoges and his brother were Catherine's 'constant advisers'.

=== Two peaces ===
In the negotiations to bring the first war of religion to a close that took place on the Île aux Bœufs, the Protestants were represented by the prince de Condé, the seigneur d'Andelot, the Protestant governor of Orléans Saint-Cyr and his lieutenant Jean d'Aubigné. The royalists were represented by Catherine, the constable de Montmorency, his son the baron de Damville and Limoges. This group would succeed in their negotiations, and peace would be established on 19 March with the Edict of Amboise. Limited toleration was granted, in such a way as favoured nobles with the rights of high justice while common people would be able to practice Protestantism in one town per baillage. Protestant worship was more restricted than it had been by the Edict of Saint-Germain prior to the start of the war.

Limoges, alongside his brother Châteauneuf and various others were at some points during the talks involved in the process of negotiations for peace with England (which had entered the civil war on the side of Condé) that produced the treaty of Troyes which was established in April 1564.

=== Swiss diplomacy ===
During 1563, Calvin proposed an alliance of the Swiss cantons of Zürich and Bern with France on the understanding that a clause in favour of the Protestant church of France be included. Bullinger was sceptical of Calvin's proposal. The French king for his part was keen to both renew his alliance with the Catholic cantons and see an alliance with the Protestant cantons come to pass. Therefore he dispatched the marshal de Vielleville and Limoges to Genève to secure de Bèze's support for such a scheme in the spring of 1564. Bellièvre and the abbot of Orbais were also sent as part of this mission. The council of Genève opposed the project, but de Bèze informed the ambassadors he would intervene with Bullinger. He assured Bullinger the Protestant cantons would ensure the preservation of the rights of Protestants in the edict of Amboise would be insisted upon as a clause of the agreement. The two ambassadors travelled to Schaffhausen, Zürich and Berne to overcome resistance to the project. In addition to the religious concerns they faced from the cantons, Limoges and Vielleville were confronted by a series of monetary demands for various unpaid pensions and debts the French crown owed. They were to promise the early payments of debts the French had developed from Swiss support during the wars of Henri II. While at Freiburg, Vielleville and Limoges declared that it was their intention to see the revitalisation of the Franco-Swiss alliance without any new clauses guaranteeing adherence to the edict of Amboise. They were supported in this by the Montmorency-Châtillon who wrote to the grandees of Bern and Zürich asking them to drop this demand. The cantons should trust the word of the king and feel free to impart their feelings to the ambassadors without any inserted clauses. These efforts were all in vain, the grandees of Zürich refused alliance with France and were followed, after some hesitation by those of Bern. Nevertheless, elsewhere the mission was a success and Bellièvre received the articles negotiated by Limoges and Vielleville at Fribourg in October which were close to conclusion. On 7 December the Drei Bünde (the Three Leagues) accented to adherence to the terms of Freiburg. Another element of their mission was anti-Spanish, they were to inhibit recruitment by the Spanish and see the passes closed to the Spanish army. Bellièvre had considerable success towards this goal and the Spanish abandoned the hope of securing direct alliance with the cantons. The Grauer Bund (Grey League - one of the three parties to the Drei Bünde) had been won over by the commercial entreaties of the Spanish, but in the Drei Bünde it was a majority that counted in foreign policy decisions. The diplomatic mission thus ended at the start of 1565.

=== Second war of religion ===
The English ambassador reported in 1567 that all political decision making in the kingdom was in the hands of Catherine, Châteauneuf, Orléans and Limoges.

By February 1568, the French government was ready to see a negotiated conclusion to the second French War of Religion. To this end Limoges was dispatched on 28 February, alongside the duc de Montmorency, the bishop of Orléans and one of the king's secretaries named d'Allny. They met with the cardinal de Châtillon, the bishop of Valence, and Téligny at Longjumeau. The Protestants sought the confirmation and establishment as permanent of the edict of Amboise which had brought the first war of religion to a close. The rebel prince Condé demanded as terms of peace that all parlements register the edict and that several towns be granted to the Protestants as sûreté (surety):Boulogne and La Rochelle. The delegates of the crown argued these demands impugned Charles' honour and that the prince should trust the crown without such assurances. Charles was also little keen to see the edict of Amboise become a permanent state of affairs. Charles proposed to the Protestant delegates a marriage between the duc de Guise and Marguerite de Bourbon (Condé's daughter), and a marriage between Guise's sister Catherine and Andelot's eldest son. This little interested the Protestant delegates who redirected the conversation to observance of the edict and Protestant schools. The king agreed to these demands, and in return the Protestant delegation waived those demands they had initially made for sûreté towns and registration by all parlements. On 26 March a peace agreement was reached though the treaty of Amboise was not expanded in generosity as Condé had hoped, but rather geographically (insofar as it applied to Provence).

=== Third war of religion ===
A reshuffle was carried out in the conseil des affaires towards the end of 1569. Left on the council were six figures: the bishop of Orléans who was the garde des sceaux (de facto chancellor given L'Hôpital's disgrace); Henri de Mesmes; the seigneur de Lanssac; the cardinal de Pellevé, archbishop of Sens; cardinal de Birague and Limoges. Of these six men only Pellevé and Birague took the position of intransigent Catholicism. In the 1569 assessment of the Spanish ambassador Álava, Limoges, Lanssac, Bochetel, the duc de Montmorency and marshal de Vielleville were not viewed as particularly Catholic. Only Orléans, Mesmes and Limoges were involved in financial decision making in the council. Haan characterises Limoges, Orléans and Lanssac as a 'triumvirate' successor to the influence previously enjoyed over state affairs by Limoges' brother Châteauneuf prior to his death in 1567.

After the negotiations had been concluded to bring the third war of religion to a close, the council was assembled so that the sécretaire d'État Villeroy could read out the articles the king had granted. Among those present for the meeting was Limoges. All places that enjoyed Protestant worship at the outbreak of the war were to maintain it. Protestants would have access to universities and other institutions and be granted four places de sûreté (places of surety). After the terms were read, the king spoke and informed those assembled that his inability to gain victory by force of arms necessitated the peace. Then his two brothers Anjou and Alençon took oaths to uphold the peace. They were followed by all the princes and seigneurs present, among them Limoges.

During 1571, the French crown explored the project of a marriage between Anjou and the English queen Elizabeth I. Anjou himself was opposed to this prospect which according to the Spanish ambassador he saw as a ploy to remove him from his command of the French army and the kingdom. Alongside Anjou in opposition were several of Catherine's men on the royal council, among them the garde des Sceaux the bishop of Orléans and Limoges both of whom felt it important Anjou remain in France.

Shortly after the arrangement of marriage between the king's sister Marguerite and the Protestant king of Navarre, the French entered into a defensive agreement with the kingdom of England. The treaty of Blois was both a defensive alliance and commercial treaty. For the French it was negotiated by Limoges, cardinal de Birague and the duc de Montmorency.

== Reign of Henri III ==
=== New council ===
Having arrived back in France in the city of Lyon, Henri reconstituted the royal council. The size of the council was reduced to eight members at the recommendation of Catherine.

The new king filled his council with men of experience. Its membership was composed of: the chancellor Birague, président of the council in the king's absence; the surintendant des finances Bellièvre; the avocat général of the king in the parlement the seigneur de Pibrac; Henri's former chancellor as the duc d'Anjou, Cheverny; the future archbishop of Toulouse Paul de Foix; and the bishops of Valence (who had negotiated Henri's election as king of the Commonwealth), Orléans and Limoges. However, it would be with his favourites that had been at his side before the start of his reign that he imparted his most intimate concerns. The exclusion of princes du sang (unless summoned by the king to attend) from the new council in combination with the retention of membership for the hated Birague caused much aggrievement among nobles. On the new council: Limoges, Birague, Orléans, Foix and Valence could all be considered allies of Catherine.

New protocol was issued in 1574 for attendance in the king's cabinet, with the above men permitted to remain with the king after his entry into the cabinet, while those who were in the room prior to his entry were to withdraw unless they were the sécretaires d'État, a prince or an officer of the crown.

The council was divided between a majority faction which hoped to prosecute a war against the rebel brother of the duc de Montmorency, Damville, his province and the Protestants to restore them to obedience with the crown and a minority of moderates composed of Foix, Orléans and Limoges. As such Henri was pushed towards the war party. An army under the duc de Montpensier was already operating in Poitou, meanwhile a second army under marshal de Retz was designated to go through Provence, while an army under the prince dauphin d'Auvergne would tackle the Rhône valley and a force under the king would face off against Damville.

Limoges was among the councillors present for the conseil d'État that ratified the king's decision to surrender the remaining French possessions in Piemonte to the duke of Savoy.

=== Peace of Beaulieu and disgrace ===
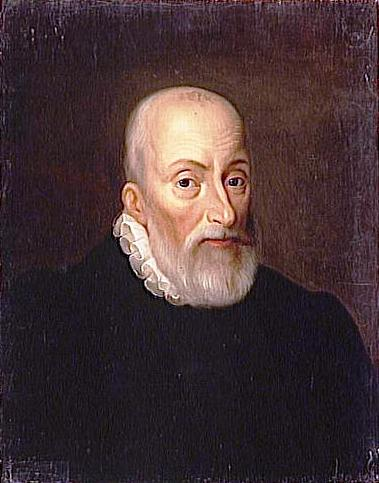
Belliėvre disgraced alongside Limoges after the Edict of Beaulieu

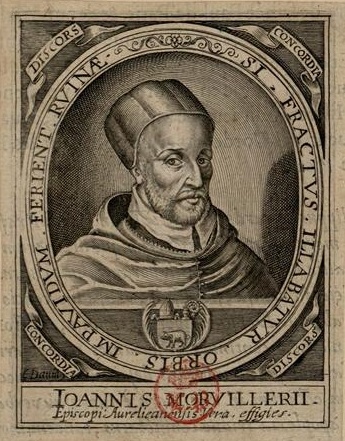
Bishop of Orléans disgraced alongside Limoges after the Edict of Beaulieu

Limoges had a role to play in the negotiations to end the fifth war of religion that were embodied in the 1576 peace of Beaulieu. The peace was a great blow to Henri's authority, humiliated and without money to prosecute a more favourable settlement. The edict greatly benefitted his brother the duc d'Alençon who now added to his appanage the duché (duchy) d'Anjou. This greatly aggrieved Henri both due to the concessions to his brother, but also the religious concessions the edict offered to the Protestants.

As late as March 1577 during the Estates General, which had been called as a term of the peace, Limoges would be on the royal council. With the peace collapsing, the prince de Condé already in the field, the Estates General tried to purge Limoges, Bellièvre and Orléans from the royal council.

Having been thus called by the Estates and frustrated at the edict of Beauileu he had been compelled to make, Henri took out his frustration on those involved in producing the edict. Limoges was disgraced for his part and the king avoided meeting with Catherine for the following two months. Thus Limoges was dismissed and this represented the end of his role in the French government. Alongside Limoges, Bellièvre and the bishop of Orléans were also disgraced. By contrast with Limoges, Belliėvre's withdrawal from the council would only be temporary.

Limoges spent the final years of his life living in retirement.

Limoges died in 1582. He was succeeded as bishop of Limoges by his nephew Jean, the son of his brother.

One of Limoges' former sécretaires Blaise de Vigenère would go on to publish a book on cryptography in 1586 which became important in the genre.

== Sources ==
- Chevallier, Pierre (1985). Henri III: Roi Shakespearien. Fayard.
- Cloulas, Ivan (1979). Catherine de Médicis. Fayard.
- Cloulas, Ivan (1985). Henri II. Fayard.
- Constant, Jean-Marie (1984). Les Guise. Hachette.
- Crété, Liliane (1985). Coligny. Fayard.
- Durot, Éric (2012). François de Lorraine, duc de Guise entre Dieu et le Roi. Classiques Garnier.
- Ferrer-Bartomeu, Jérémie (2022). L'État à la Lettre: Écrit Politique et Société Administrative en France au Temps des Guerres de Religion (vers 1560 - vers 1620). Champ Vallon.
- Gellard, Matthieu (2014). Une Reine Épistolaire: Lettres et Pouvoir au Temps de Catherine de Médicis. Classiques Garnier.
- Haan, Bertrand (2011). L'Amitié Entre Princes: Une Alliance Franco-Espagnole au Temps des Guerres de Religion (1560-1570). Presses Universitaires de France.
- Jouanna, Arlette (1998). "Le Temps des Guerres de Religion en France (1559-1598)". In Jouanna, Arlette; Boucher, Jacqueline; Biloghi, Dominique; Le Thiec, Guy (eds.). Histoire et Dictionnaire des Guerres de Religion.
- Jouanna, Arlette (1998b). "L'Aubespine". In Jouanna, Arlette; Boucher, Jacqueline; Biloghi, Dominique; Le Thiec, Guy (eds.). Histoire et Dictionnaire des Guerres de Religion.
- Knecht, Robert (2016). Hero or Tyrant? Henry III, King of France, 1574-1589. Routledge.
- Le Roux, Nicolas (2000). La Faveur du Roi: Mignons et Courtisans au Temps des Derniers Valois. Champ Vallon.
- Le Roux, Nicolas (2022). 1559-1629 Les Guerres de Religion. Gallimard.
- Nawrocki, François (2015). L'Amiral Claude d'Annebault, Conseiller Favori de François I. Classiques Garnier.
- Pernot, Michel (2013). Henri III: Le Roi Décrié. Éditions de Fallois.
- Potter, David (1995). A History of France 1460-1560: The Emergence of a Nation State. Macmillan.
- Rivault, Antoine (2023). Le Duc d'Étampes et la Bretagne: Le Métier de gouverneur de Province à la Renaissance (1543-1565). Presses Universitaires de Rennes.
- Roelker, Nancy (1968). Queen of Navarre: Jeanne d'Albret 1528-1572. Harvard University Press.
- Romier, Lucien (1913). Les Origines Politiques des Guerres de Religion I: Henri II et L'Italie (1547-1555). Librairie Académique Perrin et Cie.
- Romier, Lucien (1913b). Les Origines Politiques des Guerres de Religion II: La Fin de la Magnificence Extérieure, le Roi contre les Protestants (1555-1559). Librairie Académique Perrin et Cie.
- Salmon, J.H.M. (1979). Society in Crisis: France in the Sixteenth Century. Metheun & Co.
- Shimizu, J. (1970). Conflict of Loyalties: Politics and Religion in the Career of Gaspard de Coligny, Admiral of France, 1519–1572. Geneva: Librairie Droz.
- Solnon, Jean-François (2001). Henri III: un désir de majesté. Librarie Académique Perrin.
- Sutherland, Nicola (1962). The French Secretaries of State in the Age of Catherine de Medici. The Athlone Press.
- Sutherland, Nicola (1980). The Huguenot Struggle for Recognition. Yale University Press.
- Thompson, James (1909). The Wars of Religion in France 1559-1576: The Huguenots, Catherine de Medici and Philip II. Chicago University Press.
- Wanegffelen, Thierry (2023). Ni Rome Ni Genève: Des Fidèles entre Deux Chaires en France a XVIe Siècle. Classiques Garnier.
