= Jean de Morvillier =

French politician (1506–1577)

- Bishop of Orléans; Abbot of Saint Pierre de Melun; Garde des Sceaux
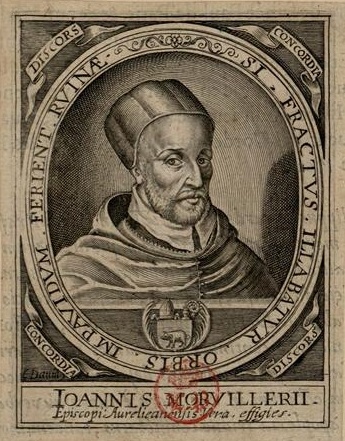
- Engraving of Morvillier
- Church: Roman Catholic Church
- Diocese: Orléans
- Appointed: 27 April 1552
- Term ended: 6 September 1564
- Predecessor: Pierre du Chastel
- Successor: Mathurin de La Saussaye

Personal details
- Born: c. 1506 France
- Died: 23 October 1577 (aged 70/71) Tours, France

Jean de Morvillier, bishop of Orléans (c. 1506–23 October 1577) was a French noble, prelate, diplomat and de facto chancellor during the latter Italian Wars and early French Wars of Religion. Born into a prominent robe noble family, Morvillier began his royal service during the reign of François I, serving first as maître des requêtes for the king, and then ambassador to Venezia from 1546 to 1550. Early in the reign of François' successor he was granted the bishopric of Orléans as a reward for his service. While he would largely be an absentee bishop, he appointed vicars to govern his See in his stead. Throughout the next years he conducted himself as a diplomat, negotiating the Treaty of Angers with England in 1551, and later the Treaty of Cateau-Cambrésis in 1559 that brought the Italian Wars to a close.

After the death of Henri II he maintained an important position in the council of his successor, becoming garde des sceaux from March to May 1560, giving him the powers of the chancellor even if he didn't hold the office formerly, during the transition from the chancellorship of François Olivier to Michel de L'Hôpital. He was among the grandees invited to the Assembly of Notables that August that met to discuss the financial and religious problems of the kingdom, a result of which was the calling of an Estates General. Morvillier was involved in a diplomatic mission to Piedmont to oversee the transfer of French controlled towns to the duke in 1562. In 1564 he participated in the final meetings of the Council of Trent, though he left before its conclusion. Shortly after this he was again negotiating with England, establishing the Treaty of Troyes in which England recognised French control of Calais. In the civil wars that followed until his death in 1577, Morvillier was a consistent advocate for peace, as a method of ensuring the king's control of the kingdom, and as such negotiated many of the peaces, including Longjumeau.

In 1568 with the disgrace of L'Hôpital, Morvillier again became garde des sceaux, though this time for a period of three years, with L'Hôpital nominally remaining chancellor until his death in 1573, at which time René de Birague became Chancellor. Morvillier was again negotiating with England in 1572 when he helped secure the Treaty of Blois, before assisting the queen in her pet project marriage between Navarre and Marguerite de Valois. Morvillier alone among the council that decided on the liquidation of the Protestant leadership was hesitant to endorse the killings, and tried to bring a semblance of regular royal justice to the killing of Admiral Coligny. Morvillier assisted in the negotiations that saw Anjou elected as king of the Commonwealth. When Anjou ascended to kingship in France, Morvillier was among his chief council, and guided the king during the crisis of the Estates General, though by now his popularity among radical Catholics was so low he felt compelled to retire. The following year he died during the courts return from Poitiers, on 23 October 1577.

== Early life and family ==
Jean de Morvillier was the son of Étienne de Morvillier. Étienne was procureur to Louis XII for the county of Blois. Jean's sister Marie married the secretary of state Guillaume Bochetel, who as a member of a dynasty of royal secretaries, ensured that Morvillier was related to L'Aubespine and Villeroy.

== Reign of François I ==
In 1536 Morvillier became lieutenant-general of the city of Bourges. Some time after this he entered the church hierarchy of Bourges as a dean.

Morvillier served as maître des requêtes to the king for 20 years, with a break during his period as ambassador, and a member of the royal council for 30 years. He had close familial relations with many of the secretaries of states of the kingdom, which enabled him to operate as a skilled politician. During the Italian Wars Morvillier served as an ambassador to Venezia from 1546 to 1550.

== Reign of Henri II ==
=== Bishop ===
In 1551 he conducted his first diplomatic mission in England, assisting in the negotiation of the Treaty of Angers on 19 July 1551, that fostered an entente between the countries. In 1552, Morvillier became bishop of Orléans. This was not without dispute with the local chapter which objected to the presence of his beard, asserting that this was an indication of a worldly man. Morvillier appealed to the king who informed the chapter that his beard was necessary as he would be conducting worldly matters through his involvement at court. Morvillier's ascent to the bishopric of Orléans was a political move by the king to reward one of his officers for the service rendered to him. While now bishop of Orléans, he would not take possession of his bishopric until 1559, and in the intervening period entrusted stewardship of the See to three vicars. In 1563 he resigned from control of the See in favour of his nephew Mathurin de la Saussaye. Though an absentee bishop, he was not insensitive to his See, and had organised pastoral matters there occasionally.

=== Negotiator ===
During 1555 Morvillier would resume his role of diplomat, participating in negotiations with the imperial diplomat Granvelle, they were however unable to deliver a convincing peace. With the bankruptcy of France's great enemy Spain in 1558, Morvillier was tasked by the king with soothing the fears of the foreign bankers in Lyon, assuring them that French credit would remain good.

=== End of the Italian Wars ===
After the disaster at the battle of Saint-Quentin in which the French army was destroyed and the Constable captured, the duke of Guise was urgently recalled from his stillborn Italian campaign to defend the kingdom. Morvillier welcomed Guise for the court on his re-entry to France at Lyon. Commanded to raise funds, Morvillier struggles to coax the bankers of the city into providing 30,000 livres for the king. During the following years of Guise ascendency, Morvillier would lend his financial expertise to Cardinal Lorraine in administering the finances of the kingdom with the aim of avoiding the financial precipice.

With Henri exhausted by the Italian Wars, which had not been going well for France, he established a peace commission in October 1558 to prepare for more final negotiations. Morvillier was among the notables involved in this group, which included Marshal Saint-André, Constable Montmorency and Cardinal Lorraine, all of whom were chief among the king's favour at court. The following year their negotiations would result in the Treaty of Cateau-Cambrésis which concluded the Italian Wars.

== Reign of François II ==
=== Garde des sceaux ===
On 30 March 1560, Chancellor Olivier died while in office. To cover the period before a new chancellor could be selected, Morvillier was chosen as the garde des sceaux to fulfill the duties of the chancellor in the intervening period. In May 1560, Michel de L'Hôpital was chosen as the new chancellor, and Morvillier surrendered his duties.

=== Estates ===
In the wake of the Conspiracy of Amboise, France was faced with religious instability that could not be ignored, in combination with financial problems that had been eating away at the kingdom since the reign of Henri II. To remedy this an Assembly of Notables was called at Fontainbleau in August 1560. Morvillier was among the delegates at this gathering, which agreed on the need to call an Estates General to remedy the financial ills of the kingdom, and an assembly of the church to address the issues of religious diversity.

== Reign of Charles IX ==
=== Piedmont ===
Morvillier travelled to his See in April 1562, so that he might negotiate with Condé who had entered rebellion. While in the city he witnessed the sack of his cathedral. The negotiations proved fruitless, and the civil war would continue unabated. Later that year Morvillier would be dispatched as part of a commission to restore the remaining French held towns in Piedmont back to the duke of Savoy. It was hoped that this would secure the duke's friendship to the king, and thus assistance against the rebels. The future Marshal, Bourdillon, also a member of the commission and lieutenant-general of French Piedmont, proved a road block to the hand over, however he was bought off in November with a promise of receiving the Marshal baton, allowing the transfer to go ahead.

=== Peace ===
Following the Peace of Amboise, Protestants became irate at what they considered an increasing Catholic domination of the court. In particular they were frustrated at the influence Morvillier, the Constable and l'Aubespine held over Catherine de Medici's policy. Despite this, historians consider Morvillier as having occupied a largely centrist position in the council in the years 1563–7.

In 1564, Morvillier was part of the French delegation to the Council of Trent alongside Cardinal Lorraine. Later that year, Morvillier again negotiated with England, which brought to a formal close the English invasion of France that had occurred during the first French War of Religion. As part of the treaty French ownership of Calais was acknowledged by the English in exchange for 120,000 livres.

=== Second civil war ===
The peace would not however last, with leading members of the Protestant nobility attempting a coup against the crown in the Surprise of Meaux. Morvillier was absent for the coup, having travelled to Bruxelles on a diplomatic mission to congratulate Alba on his appointment as governor of the Spanish Netherlands in August, and being on the road back to France at the time. The court was able to evade capture and flee back to Paris. Now trapped in the city while the rebel force settled in to besiege Paris, Catherine sent Morvillier out to stall for time in negotiations with the Prince of Condé. Condé demanded the revocation of all taxes imposed since Louis XII's reign and full freedom of religion for Protestantism. This was unacceptable for the crown, and during the negotiations an army was assembled the city that broke the siege in November during the battle of Saint-Denis.

Morvillier, in conjunction with the secretary of state Alluye would play the role of principal negotiators for the crown that formulated the Peace of Longjumeau, which brought the short second civil war to a close in March the following year. The peace was largely a restating of the 1563 peace. During council in 1568, Morvillier argued in opposition to L'Hôpital, that the civil war and strife that had engulfed France in two civil wars was not only due to the youth of the king, but also due to 'religious diversity' in the kingdom. He acknowledged however that the king's youth played a role, highlighting that he was not obeyed as previous kings had been.

=== Garde des sceaux ===
The peace that he had negotiated would prove ephemeral, and the courts financial situation would push them back into war in September 1568, with the Pope offering the alienation of church property in return for a resumption of war against heresy. While this was unacceptable to chancellor L'Hôpital, who strove to get the court to reject the deal, the rest of the court was decided, and L'Hôpital was dispossessed of his seals. On 7 October, Morvillier became keeper of the seals and provided his assent to the resumption of war. This granted him the further role of head of the royal council, a position he would exercise throughout the civil war that followed. He was increasingly old and sick however, and frequently retired from court to the abbey of Saint Pierre de Melun, which he had been granted in 1560. The third civil war would be the most destructive yet, and continue into 1570. When peace was at last declared in the Peace of Saint-Germain-en-Laye, radical Catholics outraged at the concessions blamed Morvillier and François de Montmorency for 'traitorously' coming to terms with the Protestants.

=== Departure from power ===
In 1571, Morvillier resigned his possession of the seals, and they were subsequently given to Birague on 22 March, who would become chancellor in 1573 upon L'Hôpital's death. Morvillier had been outraged at the king's decision to appease the Emperor, by releasing the duke of Lorraine from the homage he owed the kingdom of France for the Duchy of Bar that he held. Morvillier fumed that he would not be responsible for separating France form a territory owing allegiance to it. His ill health also contributed to his departure, and he bemoaned to Pinart that he did not like to live in darkness and solitude.

=== Diplomat ===
During the marriage negotiations between Catherine de Medici and Jeanne d'Albret, the queen mother dispatched Birague, Paul de Foix and Morvillier to negotiate for her when tensions between the woman threatened to derail the talks. The marriage would be finalised the following month, with the wedding of Navarre, Albret's son, and Marguerite de Valois, Catherine's daughter taking place in August. Alongside his involvement in marital negotiations, Morvillier also had a role to play in the negotiations that took place with England in 1572 that culminated in the Treaty of Blois between the two countries in April, creating a defensive alliance against Spain. At this time, Coligny was attempting to exercise his return to favour through a reappearance at court. This was opposed by all Catherine's advisers, who disliked his desire for war with Spain, among them Morvillier. In June Morvillier was one of three advisers, alongside Tavannes and Nevers who were commissioned to write memoranda opposing Coligny's policy by the king. During a council meeting on 10 August where Coligny again advocated war, Morvillier interjected to highlight that France would be fighting alone, with the German Protestant princes and Elizabeth I unwilling to provide any support.

=== Assassination and a massacre ===
After the attempt on Admiral Coligny's life on 22 August, the situation in the capital rapidly deteriorated. Morvillier was present on the royal council that resolved upon the need to eliminate the Protestant leadership to avoid a resumption of the civil wars. Present were the king's brother Anjou, Catherine, Retz, Tavannes, Nevers and Morvillier. All were resolved in favour of elimination, with the exception of Morvillier, who, according to the Italian ambassadors wept as he accepted the decision of the council. He would however exert what influence he had to ensure that after the assassinations were carried out, a trial was conducted on an effigy of Coligny, and the captive Cavagne and Bricquemault, such that in a small way the ordinary rules of justice were maintained. On 27 October the latter were judged as guilty of conspiracy and hanged. Meanwhile, Coligny was found guilty of lèse majesté, with his effigy being hanged. His property was thus confiscated and his coat of arms dragged through the street.

During the massacre that followed the assassination, as the carefully orchestrated hits devolved into indiscriminate bloodshed, Morvillier took it upon himself to shelter an envoy of the duke of Saxony Hubert Languet, who had come to the city for the wedding of Navarre and Marguerite.

=== Commonwealth ===
In August 1573 the possibility of the election of Anjou as king of the Commonwealth became available. Keen to seize on this negotiations began between the country and the crown to secure his election. Certain demands were imposed by the Polish nobility that Catherine was not eager to see her son subject to. Morvillier was tasked with negotiating a way that Anjou would be able to avoid swearing to uphold any constitutional oaths. Articles were drawn up that were acceptable to Anjou, and he approved them on 9 September.

== Reign of Henri III ==
=== Inner circle ===
At the advent of Henri III's reign, Morvillier maintained a role on his inner council, that he had held during the reign of Charles IX. He was one of eight advisers to the king, alongside Chancellor Birague, Bishop Monluc, Paul de Foix and the future chancellor Cheverny. In June 1575 he was tasked among other figures on the council with assisting in the organisation of the collection of the tailli and gabelle tax.

=== Estates General ===
As a consequence of the generous Peace of Monsieur, which brought the fifth war of religion to a close in 1576, an Estates General was to be called. It met in December of that year and was dominated by radical Catholics who wished to overturn the peace. At the opening of the estates, the king gave a speech that was well received. It is likely a version of this speech had been written by Morvillier, however the king was active in editing it before its delivery. During the course of the estates, the king was wont to ask Morvillier for his opinion on various matters, and Morvillier recommended to him that he put himself at the head of the Catholic ligue to neutralise it. Among the demands of the delegates was the dismissal of members of the royal council they perceived as soft on heresy, Pomponne de Bellièvre and Morvillier. When the first estate proposed enforcing a singular religion on France, Morvillier was among the councillors who rallied around Catherine in opposing their demand as desirable in theory, but in practice likely to cause civil strife. Nevertheless, the opposition of the estates caused him to retreat from the estates, returning to Paris.

=== Death ===
He travelled with the court to Poitiers the following year, after the conclusion of the Treaty of Bergerac in September 1577 he departed again with the court but fell ill on the road home at Tours. On 12 October he made his will, several weeks later on 23 October he received his last rites and died.

Michel de Castlenau another of his nephew-in-law's was chosen by Catherine to inherit his abbey. He died with 83,000 livres in cash and annuities in his possession.

== Sources ==
- Baumgartner, Frederic (1986). Change and Continuity in the French Episcopate: The Bishops and the Wars of Religion 1547-1610.
- Baumgartner, Frederic (1988). Henry II: King of France 1547–1559. Duke University Press.
- Carroll, Stuart (2009). Martyrs and Murderers: The Guise Family and the Making of Europe. Oxford University Press.
- Chevallier, Pierre (1985). Henri III: Roi Shakespearien. Fayard.
- Cloulas, Ivan (1979). Catherine de Médicis. Fayard.
- Cloulas, Ivan (1985). Henri II. Fayard.
- Durot, Éric (2012). François de Lorraine, duc de Guise entre Dieu et le Roi. Classiques Garnier.
- Jouanna, Arlette (1998). Histoire et Dictionnaire des Guerres de Religion. Bouquins.
- Jouanna, Arlette (2007). The St Bartholomew's Day Massacre: The Mysteries of a Crime of State. Manchester University Press.
- Knecht, Robert (2014). Catherine de' Medici. Routledge.
- Knecht, Robert (2016). Hero or Tyrant? Henry III, King of France, 1574-1589. Routledge.
- Roberts, Penny (2013). Peace and Authority during the French Religious Wars c.1560-1600. Palgrave Macmillan.
- Roelker, Nancy (1968). Queen of Navarre: Jeanne d'Albret 1528–1572. Harvard University Press.
- Roelker, Nancy (1996). One King, One Faith: The Parlement of Paris and the Religious Reformation of the Sixteenth Century. University of California Press.
- Le Roux, Nicolas (2000). La Faveur du Roi: Mignons et Courtisans au Temps des Derniers Valois. Champ Vallon.
- Salmon, J.H.M (1975). Society in Crisis: France during the Sixteenth Century. Metheun & Co.
- Shimizu, J. (1970). Conflict of Loyalties: Politics and Religion in the Career of Gaspard de Coligny, Admiral of France, 1519–1572. Geneva: Librairie Droz.
- Sutherland, Nicola (1962). The French Secretaries of State in the Age of Catherine de Medici. The Athlone Press.
- Sutherland, Nicola (1980). The Huguenot Struggle for Recognition. Yale University Press.
- Thompson, James (1909). The Wars of Religion in France 1559–1576: The Huguenots, Catherine de Medici and Philip II. Chicago University Press.
