= François Olivier =

French politician (1487–1560)

- Sieur de Leuville; Chancellor of France
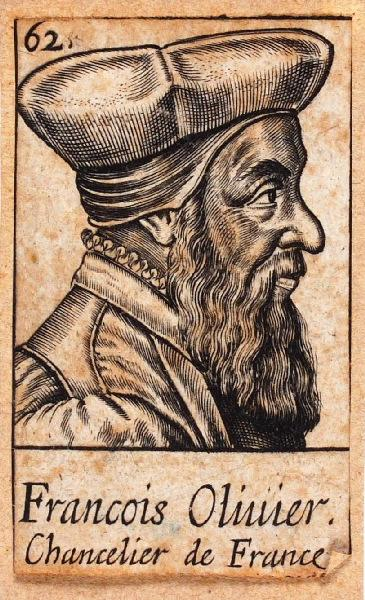
- Engraving of Olivier by Léonard Gaultier
- Born: c. 1487
- Died: 30 March 1560 Paris
- Father: Jacques Olivier
- Mother: Madeleine Luiller

François Olivier, Sieur de Leuvillé (c. 1487-30 March 1560) was Chancellor of France from 1545 to his death in 1560. After having spent his early career serving in the Parlement and chancelleries of the royal family he was elevated to the prestigious role of Chancellor of France upon the disgrace of Guillaume Poyet.

In this role he worked closely with the kings on royal policy, serving as a member of the conseil des affaires under both François I and Henri II. Under Henri he championed a limited view of Parlement authority in favour of the king. In 1551 he would have the seals of the office removed from him and given to Jean de Bertrand, a favourite of Diane de Poitiers, while he would continue to be chancellor he was removed from any real power under the pretext of ill health. He retired to his estates where he spent the next eight years.

In 1559 upon the death of Henri II, Diane was disgraced, and her favourite removed from the seals. Olivier was summoned to resume the full chancellorship of France and found himself central once more to the administration of the young king. With the crisis of the Conspiracy of Amboise Olivier was a supporter of the crown's new direction, championing the Edict of Amboise. He would not long outlive the attack on Amboise, dying on 30 March.

== Early life and family ==
François Olivier was the son of Premier Président Jacques Olivier and Madeleine Luiller who was of one of the most prestigious robe families in Paris. He began his career in the chanceries of various members of the French royal family.

== Reign of François I ==
Prior to ascending to the chancellorship, Olivier was appointed as a Président in Parlement in 1543. At this time he was granted a role in the conseil des affaires. This was a small council composed of the leading nobles designed for directing the crown's policy direction. He served as Premier Président of the Toulouse Parlement. In his role as a chancellor for the duchy of Alençon he oversaw Jeanne d'Albret's compliance with the Treaty of Crépy. In 1545 he was made chancellor of France, replacing the disgraced Guillaume Poyet who had been arrested.

== Reign of Henri II ==
=== New king ===
With the ascent of Henri II, Olivier at first maintained his place on the kings conseil des affaires. Most other inherited officials Henri acquired from his predecessor were immediately replaced in the 'palace revolution' but he maintained Olivier.

With Henri heading to Italy shortly after his ascension Catherine de Medici was granted the regency in his absence. To assist her in governance a council of five was created, among whom was Olivier.

In 1549, a report was prepared by Jean du Tillet for Henri II, outlining the jurisdiction of the Parlements in a way advantageous for royal authority. Tillet presented his report to Olivier who then adapted it into a speech before Parlement, arguing that Jean II had limited the Parlement's jurisdiction to cases of the peers of France, with affairs of state no longer a matter for the Parlement's to discuss unless they were granted a special commission. The body required with outrage to this speech.

=== Removal ===
It was customary when a chancellor earned the kings ire to allow them to maintain their office while obliging them to part with the seals. In 1551 Olivier ceased to be the bearer of the seals as Jean Bertrand assumed control of them and exercised his office for 8 years, however Olivier continued as Chancellor. The fiction of poor health was put forward to explain the removal of the seals from his possession. Bertrand was a client of Diane de Poitiers, Henri's mistress.

=== Retirement ===
Removed from office, Olivier retired to his estates for the rest of Henri's reign. As time went on Henri increasingly turned to Olivier for advice and assistance. In 1558 with preparations being made for a conclusive end to the Italian Wars, Olivier was tasked by Henri with drawing up an analysis of the prior treaties of the wars, which would then be given to those negotiating this peace.

== Reign of François II ==
=== Restoration to favour ===
In 1559 upon the death of Henri II, Diane was ousted from her central position and exiled from court, her removal left Bertrand the keeper of the seals vulnerable and he was soon removed from the privilege. Olivier was restored to the seals, granting him once more the powers of his office. Quickly into the new reign Olivier would find himself visiting the king every morning alongside Catherine and the Guise, counselling him on the business of the day.

=== Crisis and death ===
In 1560 during the Conspiracy of Amboise Olivier assisted with the interrogation of the prisoners, admonishing them for daring to rebel against their king, informing some that while they deserved death the king in his clemency had decided to let them live. Olivier was hesitant to affix his seal to the orders that emanated from Amboise granting François, Duke of Guise the role of lieutenant-general so that he might suppress the crisis, however the order would be issued regardless. Olivier was in support of a change of royal policy towards Protestants in the wake of the attempt, championing the Edict of Amboise. Shortly after the conspiracy was crushed Olivier died, and was replaced by Michel de l'Hôpital.

== Sources ==
- Baird, Henry (1880). History of the Rise of the Huguenots: Vol 2 of 2. Hodder & Stoughton.
- Baumgartner, Frederic (1988). Henry II: King of France 1547–1559. Duke University Press.
- Knecht, Robert (1998). Catherine de' Medici. Routledge.
- Roelker, Nancy (1968). Queen of Navarre: Jeanne d'Albret 1528–1572. Harvard University Press.
- Roelker, Nancy (1996). One King, One Faith: The Parlement of Paris and the Religious Reformation of the Sixteenth Century. University of California Press.
- Salmon, J.H.M (1975). Society in Crisis: France during the Sixteenth Century. Metheun & Co.
- Shimizu, J. (1970). Conflict of Loyalties: Politics and Religion in the Career of Gaspard de Coligny, Admiral of France, 1519–1572. Geneva: Librairie Droz.
- Thompson, James (1909). The Wars of Religion in France 1559–1576: The Huguenots, Catherine de Medici and Philip II. Chicago University Press.
