= Treaty of Cateau-Cambrésis =

Peace treaty that ended the Italian Wars

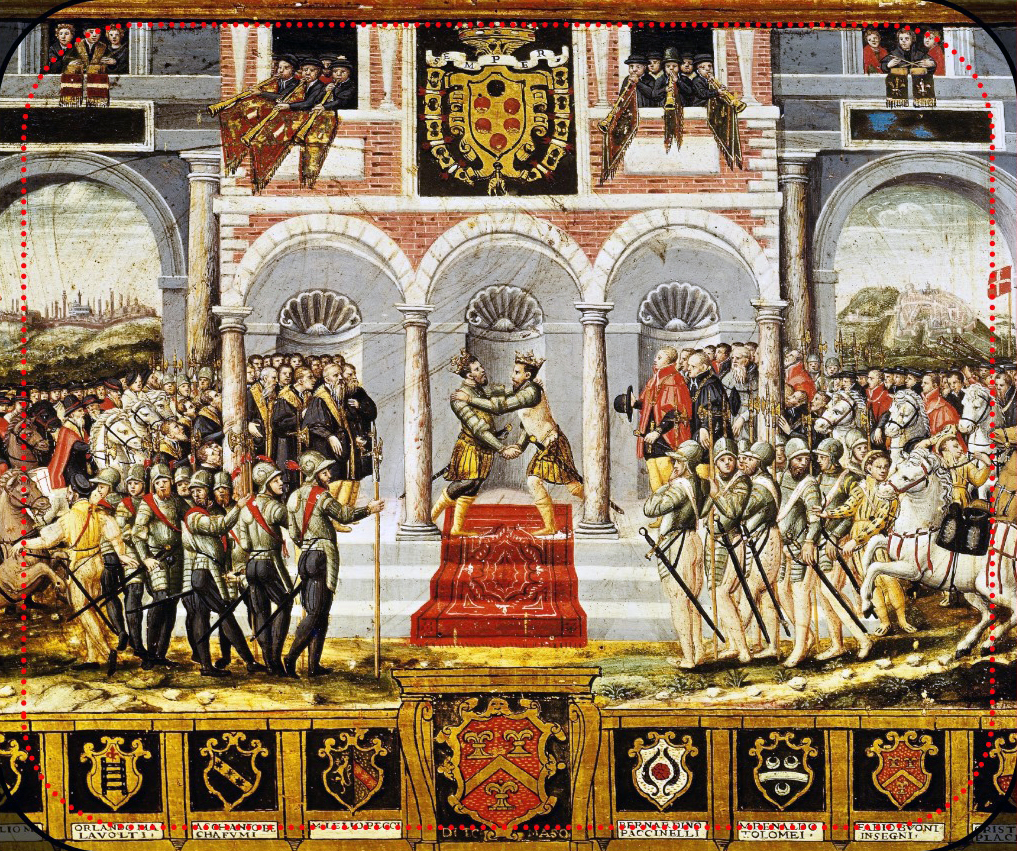
- Signing of the Treaty of Cateau-Cambrésis; Henry II of France and Philip II of Spain in centre
- Signed: 2 April 1559 (England and France); 3 April 1559 (France and Spain)
- Location: Le Cateau
- Original signatories: (Kingdom of France) Cardinal of Lorraine; Duke of Montmorency; Seigneur de Saint-André; Jean de Morvillier; de l'Aubespine; (Kingdom of England) William Howard; Thomas Thirlby; Nicholas Wotton; (Habsburg Spain) Duke of Alba; William the Silent; Perrenot; Count Melito
- Parties: (Kingdom of France) Henry II of France; (Habsburg Spain) Philip II of Spain; (Kingdom of England) Elizabeth I of England
- Languages: French

The Treaty of Cateau-Cambrésis (Note: Also known as the Peace of Cateau-Cambrésis.) in April 1559 ended the Italian Wars (1494–1559). It consisted of two separate treaties, one between England and France on 2 April, and another between France and Spain on 3 April. Although he was not a signatory, both were approved by Emperor Ferdinand I, since many of the territorial exchanges concerned states within the Holy Roman Empire.

Henry II of France abandoned claims on the Italian states ruled by Philip II of Spain (the southern kingdoms of Naples, Sicily, and Sardinia, along with the Duchy of Milan in the north), restored an independent Savoy, returned Corsica to Genoa, and formally recognised the Protestant Elizabeth I as queen of England, rather than her Catholic cousin, Mary, Queen of Scots. In exchange, France strengthened its southern, eastern and northern borders, confirming the occupation of the Three Bishoprics and the recapture of Calais from England.

== Background ==
The Italian Wars between the House of Valois and the House of Habsburg began in 1494, and lasted for over 60 years. For much of this period, Spain and the Holy Roman Empire were ruled by Emperor Charles V until he abdicated in January 1556 and divided his possessions. The lands of the Habsburg monarchy, often referred to as "Austria", went to his brother Ferdinand, who was also elected Holy Roman Emperor. His son Philip II of Spain, who married Mary I of England in July 1554, already ruled the Spanish Netherlands and Milan in his own right. The Spanish Empire, Naples, Sicily, and Sardinia were added to these possessions.

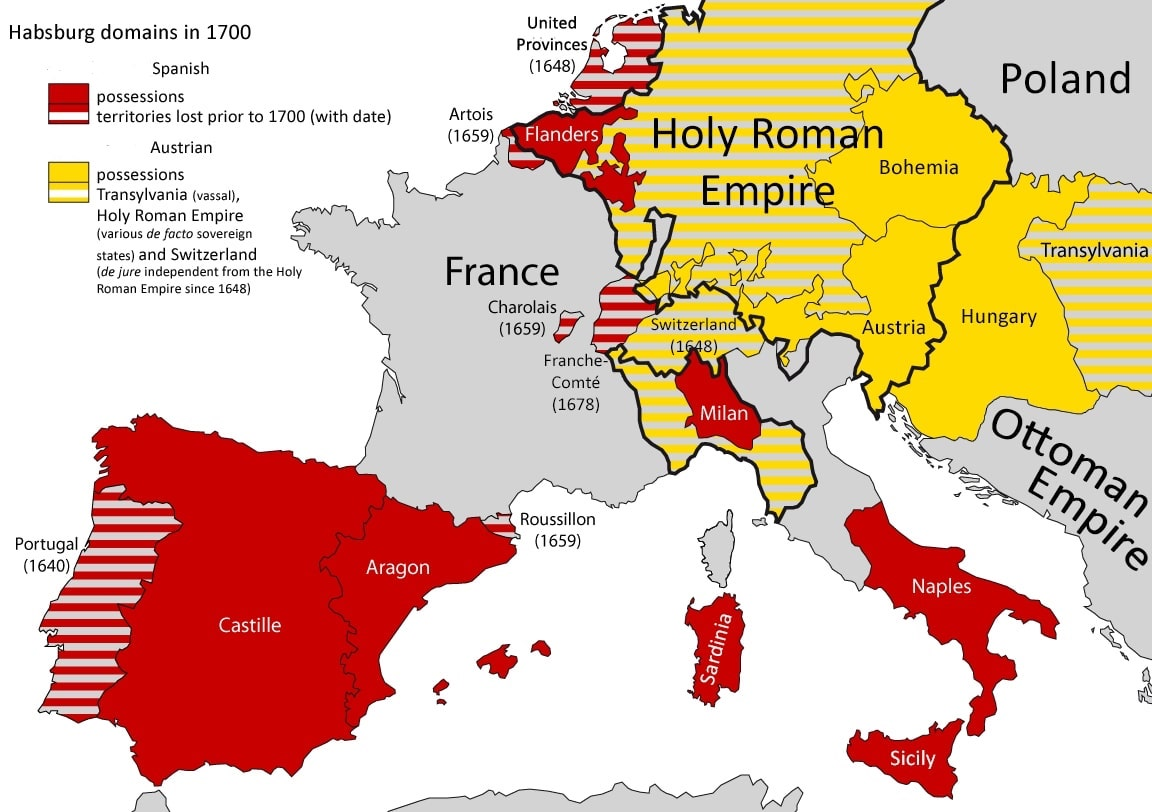
Partition of Habsburg dominions in 1556

This division was driven by the administrative complexity of managing the two empires as a single entity, but also reflected strategic differences. While Spain was a global maritime superpower, the Austrian Habsburgs focused on securing a pre-eminent position in Germany and managing the threat posed by the Ottoman Empire. A second area of divergence was how to respond to the Reformation, and growth of Protestantism. In Germany, conflict between Lutheran and Catholic princes resulted in the 1552 Second Schmalkaldic War, settled by the 1556 Peace of Augsburg.

Unlike Ferdinand, who favoured compromise with his Protestant subjects, Charles and Philip responded to the rise of Calvinism in the Spanish Netherlands with repression, a policy that eventually led to the Dutch War of Independence in 1568. Although the two Habsburg branches cooperated when their aims converged, Ferdinand was more focused on restoring order to the Empire, and dealing with the Ottomans. Philip kept fighting, but recognised peace with France would enable him to deal with the rebellious Dutch. Victories at St Quentin in 1557 and Gravelines in August 1558 allowed him to negotiate from strength.

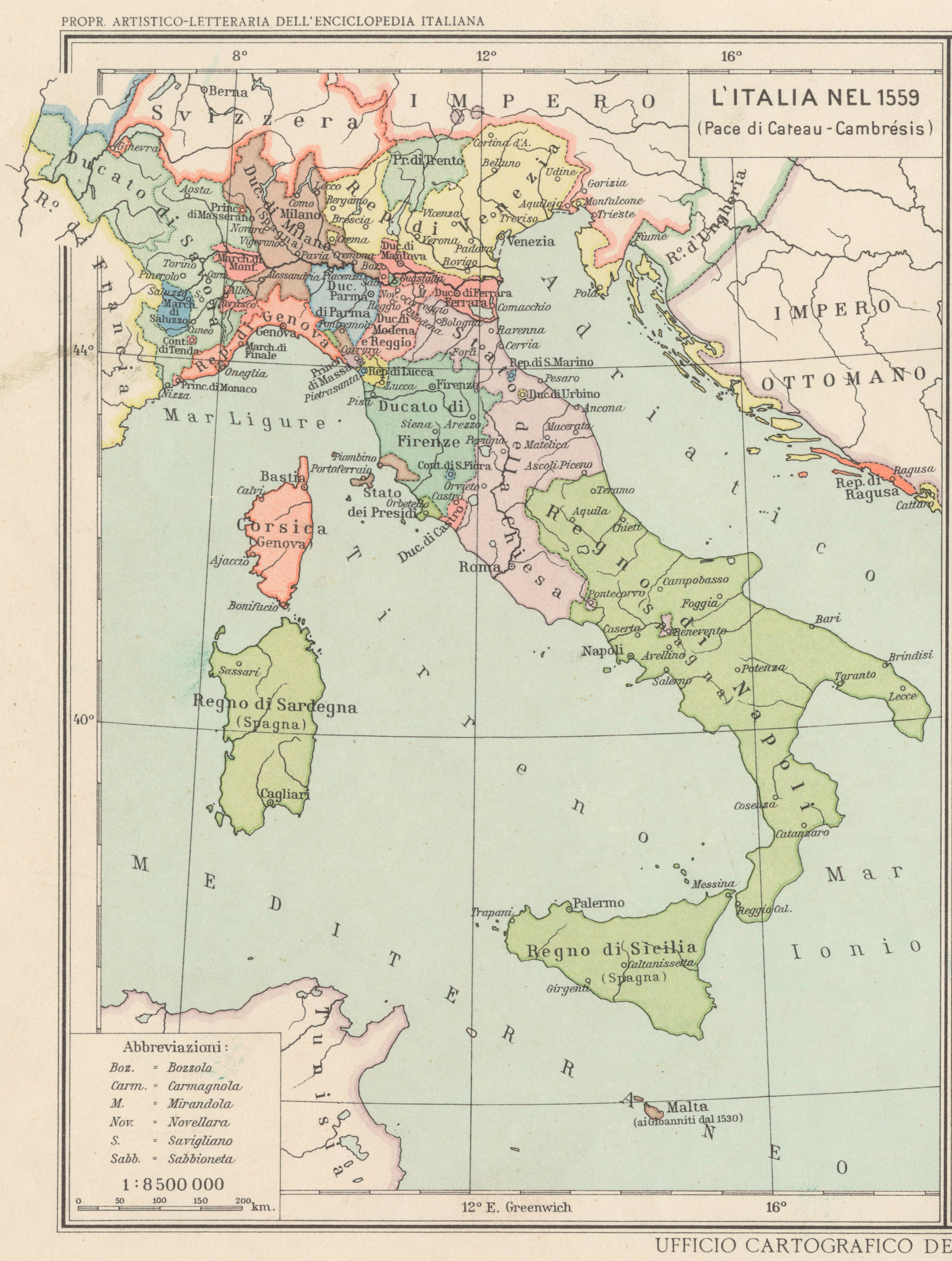
Italy in 1559

Despite these successes, Philip was struggling to finance the war, and in December 1558 advised his commander in Flanders, Emmanuel Philibert, that he could no longer pay his troops. (Note: It was only after 1568 that Spain began receiving regular shipments of silver bullion from the Potosí mines in modern Bolivia which made it the richest state in Europe.) Similar problems meant Henry II of France was also willing to reach an agreement, especially after France occupied the Three Bishoprics in 1552, and recaptured Calais in January 1558. In addition, internal divisions caused by the rise of Protestantism in France exacerbated splits within the nobility, and led to the outbreak of the French Wars of Religion in 1562.

Finally, England was also anxious to end the war, which it had entered in alliance with Spain and which was widely seen as a disastrous decision. The capture of Calais after more than 200 years severely damaged English prestige and deprived them of a bridgehead which had allowed English troops to cross the English Channel and intervene in mainland Europe with relative ease.

== Negotiations ==
=== Marck and Vaucelles ===
After three years of war, both the French and Spanish courts were making overtures for peace talks as early as November 1554. The first serious Franco-Spanish peace negotiations, although preliminary, were held at the Conference of Marck within the Pale of Calais – on then-neutral English soil – in June 1555. However, both sides made mistakes and the conference was a failure; they wanted peace, but were not ready for reconciliation yet. The failure caused both kings to desire revenge, but as their armies and finances were exhausted, they remained on the defensive and the military situation barely changed. By October 1555, diplomacy had resumed, and the Truce of Vaucelles was agreed on 5 February 1556, somewhat favourable to France. But rather than a step towards peace, Vaucelles proved to be but a lull in the war; continued desire for revenge led to numerous incidents during the negotiations, and the stipulations of the truce were never fully implemented and observed before war resumed in September 1556 with the Spanish invasion of the pro-French Papal States.

Initially, there were attempts on both sides to limit the conflict to the Papal States, but by December 1556, preparations were made for a resumption of hostilities on all fronts, and on 6 January 1557 Gaspard II de Coligny (French governor of Picardy) launched surprise attacks on Douai and Lens in the Spanish Netherlands. The Spanish victory in the Battle of St. Quentin (1557) (10–27 August) turned out to be decisive; while England had entered the war on Spain's side, France lost one ally after the other, including the Pope, who signed a separate peace on 12 September 1557. However, Henry managed to surprise friend and foe by conquering Calais in January 1558, and negotiated a marriage between Mary, Queen of Scots and his son Francis (19 April 1558); although not quite able to make up for his loss at St. Quentin, it allowed Henry to save face and obtain a better position at the negotiation table.

=== Marcoing ===
Peace talks between Spain, England and France began in early 1558, but little progress was made; France refused to contemplate Mary's demand for the return of Calais, and her marriage to Philip made it difficult for England to negotiate separately. The Franco-Spanish talks at Marcoing near Cambrai, initiated by France, lasted just three days (15–17 May 1558) and came to nothing, mostly because the Siege of Thionville (1558) was ongoing, Granvelle sought to gain time by negotiations to allow the Spanish army in the Netherlands to prepare for war, and both parties could not find diplomatic common ground.

=== Cercamp and Cateau ===
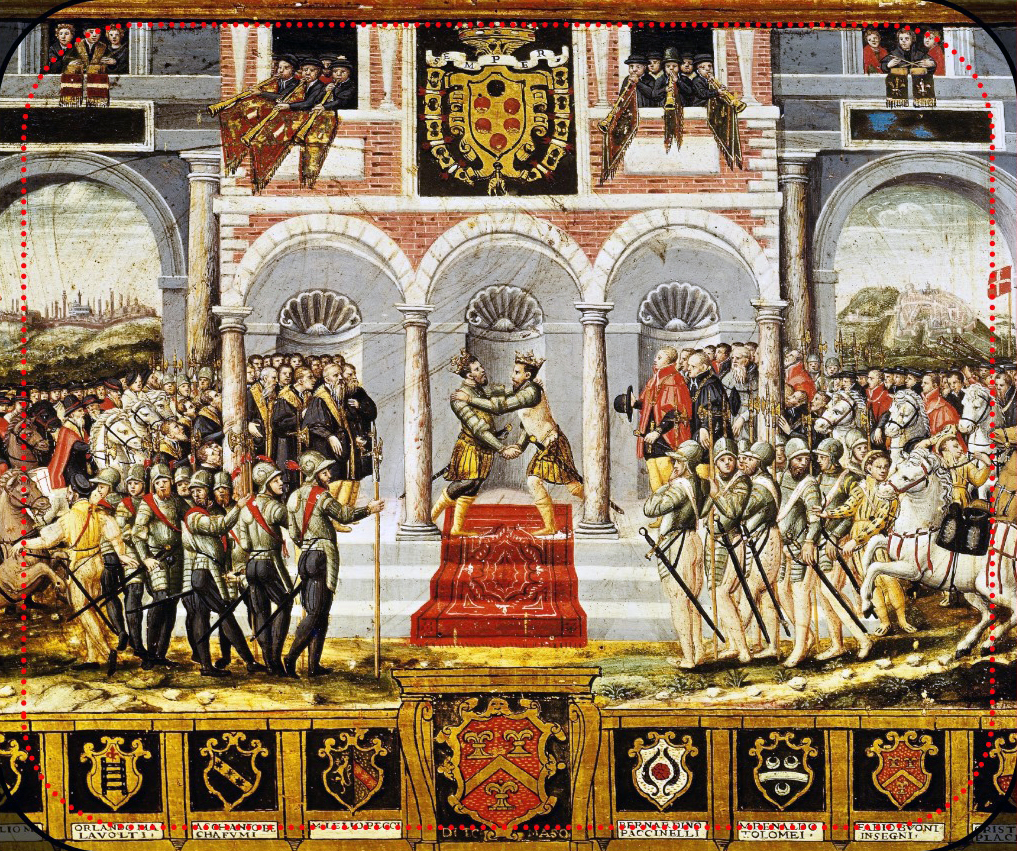
Painting of the Peace of Cateau-Cambrésis signing. Henry II of France and Philip II of Spain were in reality absent, and the peace was signed by their ambassadors.

- Presiding negotiator: Christina of Denmark, former Duchess consort of Lorraine (1544–1545)
- Chief Spanish negotiator: Antoine Perrenot de Granvelle
  - Other Spanish negotiators: Fernando Álvarez de Toledo, 3rd Duke of Alba; William I, Prince of Orange; Ruy Gómez de Silva, 1st Prince of Éboli
- Chief French negotiator: Anne de Montmorency
  - Other French negotiators: Jacques d'Albon, Seigneur de Saint André; Charles de Guise, Cardinal of Lorraine; Jean de Morvillier, bishop of Orléans; and the French secretary of state Claude de l'Aubespine
- Chief English negotiator: Henry Fitzalan, 12th Earl of Arundel
  - Other English negotiators: Thomas Thirlby, bishop of Ely; Nicholas Wotton, the dean of Canterbury and York; and William Howard, 1st Baron Howard of Effingham
- Ambassadors of other states not directly involved in the negotiations were not permitted to attend; this especially disadvantaged Italian states, because decisions about their futures were made.

Haan (2010) concluded that the negotiations from October 1558 to April 1559 focused on three major unresolved issues:

1. The fate of the Pale of Calais (owned by England, but occupied by France).
2. The fate of the territories in the north-west of Italy (i.e. Piedmont, Montferrat and the Duchy of Milan).
3. The restitution of the places of Picardy (mainly St. Quentin, Le Catelet and Ham, owned by France, but occupied by Spain).

The last two rounds of peace talks that eventually led to the Treaty of Cateau-Cambrésis began at the Cistercian monastery of Cercamp near Frévent (12 October – 26 November 1558), followed by Le Cateau-Cambrésis (10 February – 3 April 1559). Large formal meetings were held in Christina's lodgings, while informal talks were held in the diplomats' own quarters or on their way to meals. On 17 October, the Spanish and French agreed to an armistice for the remainder of that month of October. On 1 December 1558, the parties at Cercamp agreed to renew the ceasefire '...as it was first agreed on the 17th day of last October, as is said, until midnight of the last day of next January...', and on 6 February 1559 at Le Cateau-Cambrésis they prolonged the truce (then set to expire on 10 February) indefinitely 'for all the time that they are in this Negotiation, and six days after the separation of this Assembly...'.

The French plenipotentiaries intended to recover St. Quentin, Le Catelet and Ham, to keep Calais, and to maintain solid positions in northern Italy; they were willing to surrender the Duchy of Milan for proper compensation, and to compromise in the Duchy of Savoy as long as it left France with a couple of strong fortified places. The Spanish delegates demanded that Henry II abandon all his (claimed) possessions in Italy (Piedmont, Corsica, the Republic of Siena, and part of Montferrat), and they used the Spanish-occupied places in Picardy as bargaining material to achieve this goal. Emmanuel Philibert stated he was willing to surrender only four places to France, and otherwise reclaim the entire Savoyard territory for himself. The English and French made equally categorical claims to legitimate possession of Calais, and the Spanish were determined to support their English allies as long as it would not lead them to fail to achieve peace with France.

Mary's death in November 1558 and the succession of her Protestant half-sister Elizabeth I of England changed the Anglo-French dynamic. The new regime needed peace and stability more than Calais, while France had leverage in the form of the 16-year-old Catholic wife of the future Francis II of France, Mary, Queen of Scots, who also had a claim to the English throne. (Note: For various reasons, many Catholics viewed Elizabeth as illegitimate and Mary rightful queen of England, as the senior surviving legitimate descendant of Henry VII through her grandmother Margaret Tudor.) This opened the possibility of a separate Anglo-French peace and in December a new English envoy, Nicholas Wotton, arrived in France to hold informal talks separate from those in Le Cateau. Since both sides recognised English security depended upon Philip's continued goodwill, finding a way to address this issue was crucial if they were to reach a deal. Although Elizabeth continued to press for the return of Calais, she could not afford to continue fighting simply to achieve that objective and the French were well aware of that reality.

Despite attempts to keep the negotiations secret, his spies kept Philip informed on their progress; although he disliked Elizabeth's religion, having the half-French Mary on the English throne would be far worse, even if she was a Catholic. If England was about to settle, it was vital that Spain should not be left isolated, especially as Philip admitted in February that his desperate financial position made it a matter of urgency. While its involvement in the war was relatively minor, England played an important role in the negotiations that ended it, as did Emperor Ferdinand, whose approval was required since many of the territorial adjustments involved states that were members of the Holy Roman Empire. A preliminary peace treaty between France and Scotland on the one hand and England on the other was agreed on 12 March 1559 at Cateau-Cambrésis.

== Terms ==
Bertrand Haan (2010) stated that, until his publication, 'the various acts making up the Treaty of Cateau-Cambrésis have never been the subject of a scientific edition made from original documents,' pointing out that Jean Dumont's Corps universel diplomatique (1728) 'remains a reference, but is based on later copies.' Haan's 2010 edition of the Franco-Spanish agreement is based on 16th-century copies and collations (the articles in the original treaties appear to have been untitled and unnumbered), as he had no access to the originals. He also included several documents accompanying the main treaty: 'a traité des particuliers concerning lands, territorial claims or the pardon of prelates, great lords and financiers', a declaration that Christoph von Roggendorf and Juan de Luna would be excluded from the treaty, and a prisoner exchange agreement between Montmorency and Alba. He decided not to publish the Anglo-French agreement, pointing out that the original copies of it have been preserved as "J 652, n° 32" in the Trésor des Chartes of the Archives Nationales and as "E 30/1123" in the "Exchequer (Treasury of Receipts)" of the Public Record Office (now The National Archives).

- 2 April 1559: Anglo-French treaty between queen Elizabeth I and king Henry II
  - 2 April 1559: Anglo-Scottish treaty between queen Elizabeth I and Mary, Queen of Scots & the later Francis II of France
  - (related) 5 July 1560: Treaty of Edinburgh between Elizabeth I and Mary, Queen of Scots & Francis II of France
- 3 April 1559: Franco-Spanish treaty between kings Henry II and Philip II
  - 3 April 1559: Franco-Spanish traité des particuliers
  - 3 April 1559: Declaration excluding Roggendorf and Luna (3 April 1559)
  - 3 April 1559: Prisoner exchange agreement between Montmorency and Alba (3 April 1559).

=== Franco-Spanish agreement ===
- Henry II of France recognised Philip II of Spain as ruler of Milan and Naples. Henry II of France renounced his hereditary claims to the Duchy of Milan (ruled by Spain and part of the Holy Roman Empire), and recognized Spanish control over the Kingdom of Naples, the Kingdom of Sicily, and the Kingdom of Sardinia.
- Henry and Philip agreed to bring about 'the convocation and celebration of a holy universal council, so necessary for the reformation and reduction of the whole Christian Church into a true unity and harmony'. (Article 2)
- Spain returned Saint Quentin, Ham, Le Catelet and other places in northern France taken during the war. (Article 11)
- Henry confirmed Charles V's 1536 transfer of the March of Montferrat to the Duchy of Mantua, ruled by Guglielmo Gonzaga (which allied with Spain and part of the Holy Roman Empire). (Articles 21–22)
- France returned the island of Corsica to the Republic of Genoa (allied with Spain and part of the Holy Roman Empire). French and Genoese merchants were granted full access to each other's ports. (Article 24)
- France recognised the 1555 conquest of the Republic of Siena (allied with France) by the Republic of Florence (allied with Spain and part of the Holy Roman Empire) and ceded the Presidi to Philip of Spain. (Article 25)
- As part of the terms, Emmanuel Philibert, Duke of Savoy married Henry's sister Margaret of France, Duchess of Berry (1523–1574), while his eldest daughter Elisabeth of Valois (1545–1568) became Philip's third wife. (Articles 26–33)
- France withdrew from Piedmont and gave the Duchy of Savoy–Piedmont (allied with Spain and part of the Holy Roman Empire) back to Emmanuel Philibert, Duke of Savoy due to his victory at St. Quentin. Emmanuel Philibert agreed to remain neutral in the event of future conflict. (Note: "...demourant au surplus led. sr de Savoye avecques ses terres, pays et subjectz, bon prince, neutre et amy commun desd. srs Roys Très Chrestien et Catholicque." (Article 39)) (Articles 33 to 43)
- France retained five fortresses in northern Italy: near Turin ("Thurin"), Cherasco ("Quiers"), Pinerolo (Pignerol, "Pinerol"), Chivasso ("Chivaz") and Villanova d'Asti ("Villeneufve d'Ast"). (Article 34)
- France retained the Three Bishoprics of Toul, Metz, and Verdun, ceded by Maurice, Elector of Saxony for Henry's support during the Second Schmalkaldic War in 1552. (Note: The Bishoprics remained part of the Holy Roman Empire until formally incorporated into France by the 1648 Peace of Westphalia) (Article 44)

=== Anglo-French agreement ===
- (Articles 7, 8 and 14) England granted France possession of the Pale of Calais (seized from England in 1558), for an initial period of eight years (Article 7). This was a mechanism to save face and although Elizabeth tried to take advantage of the civil war to negotiate its return in 1562, it remained French thereafter.

== Consequences ==
=== Celebrations ===
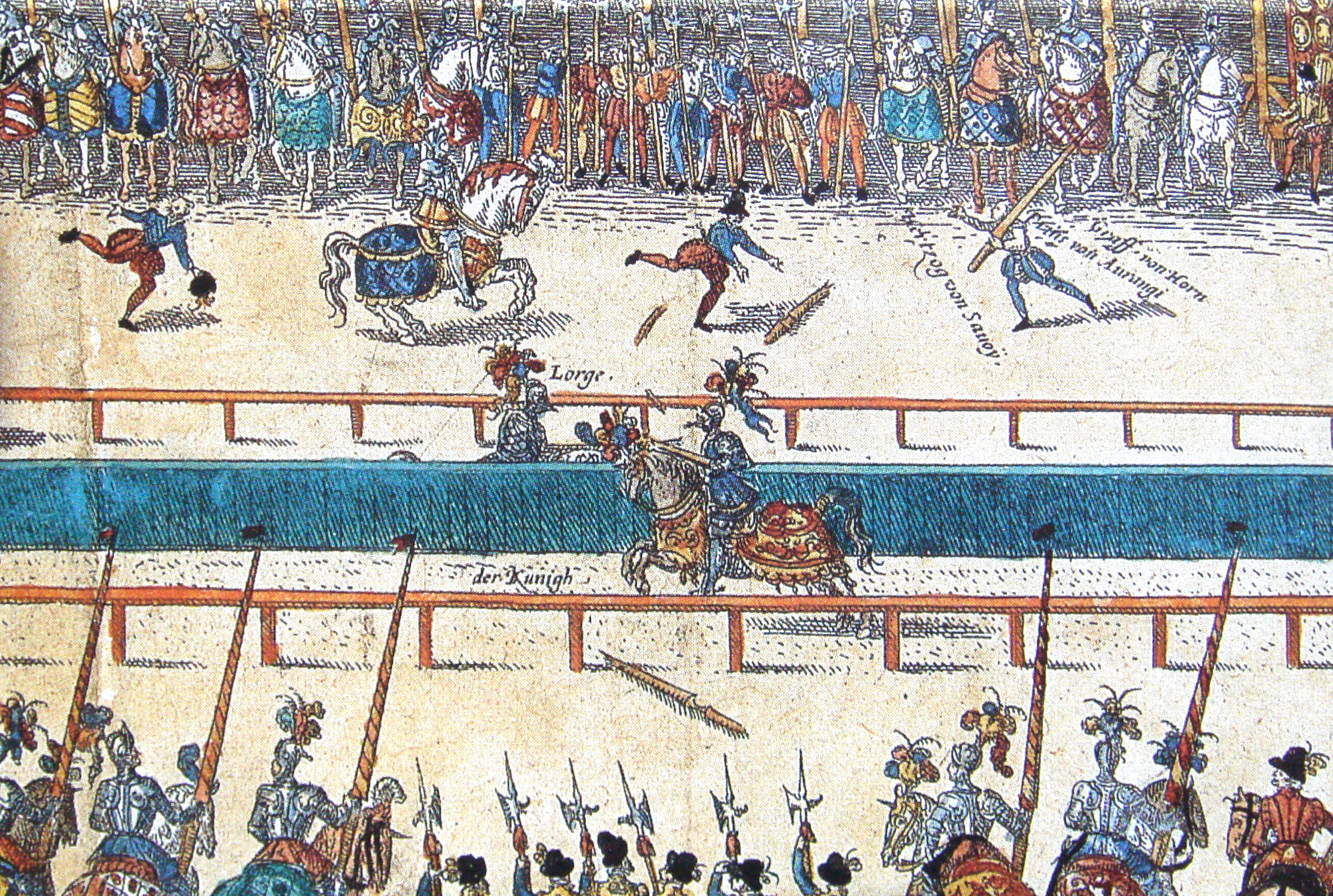
The fatal tournament between Henry II and Montgomery

Emmanuel Philibert, Duke of Savoy married Margaret of France, Duchess of Berry, the sister of Henry II of France. Philip II of Spain married Elisabeth, the daughter of Henry II of France. Often overlooked, this has been described as "the most important marriage treaty of the 16th century". During a tournament held to celebrate the peace on 1 July, King Henry was injured in a jousting accident when a sliver from the shattered lance of Gabriel Montgomery, captain of the Scottish Guard at the French court, pierced his eye and caused subdural bleeding (though it never fully entered his brain). He died ten days later on 10 July 1559. His 15-year-old son Francis II succeeded him before he too died in December 1560 and was replaced by his 10-year-old brother Charles. The resulting political instability, combined with the sudden demobilisation of thousands of largely unpaid troops, led to the outbreak of the French Wars of Religion in 1562 that would consume France for the next thirty years.

=== Territories and dynasties ===
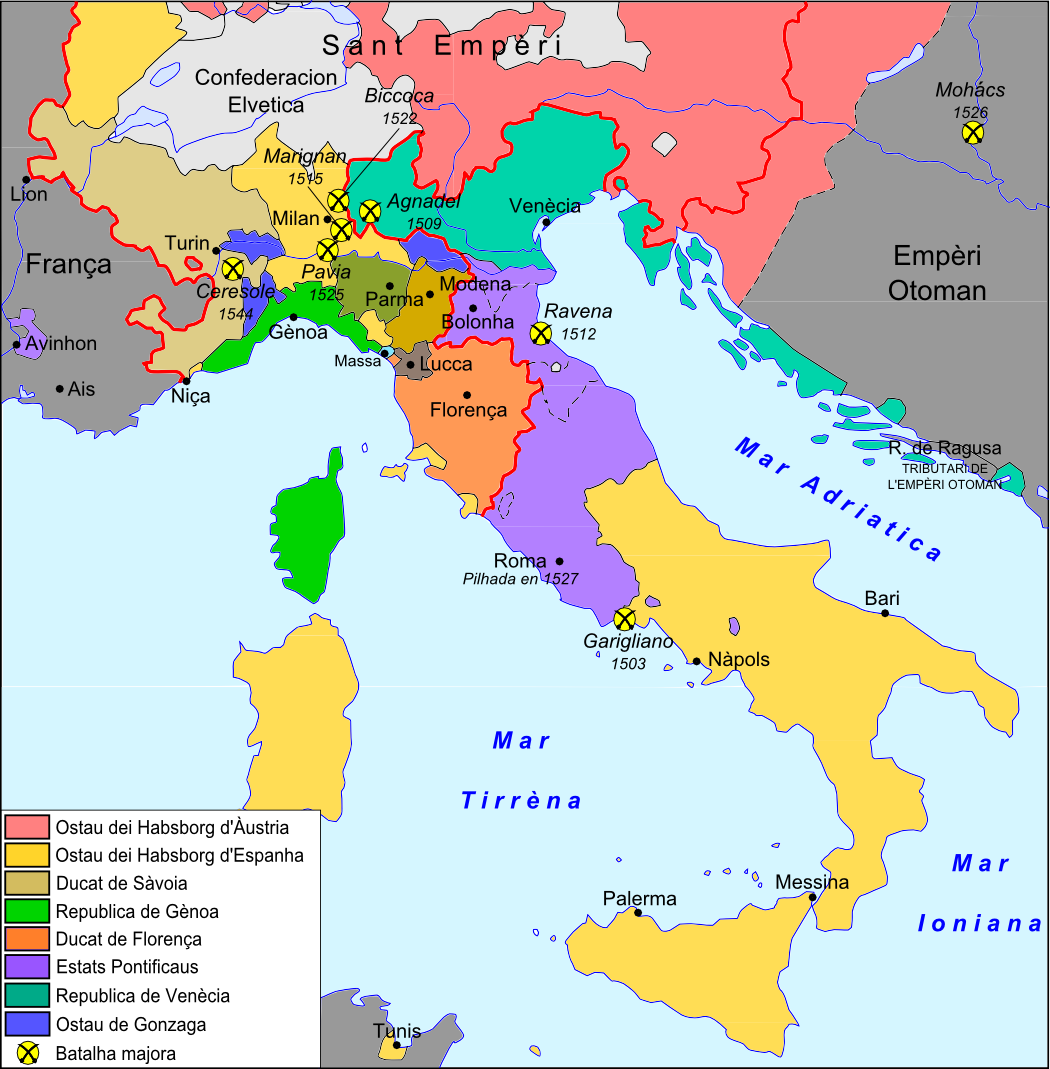
Italy after the Treaties of Cateau-Cambrésis

By the terms of the treaties, France ended military operations in the Spanish Netherlands and the Imperial fiefs of northern Italy and brought an end to most of the French occupation in Corsica, Tuscany and Piedmont. England and the Habsburgs, in exchange, ended their opposition to French occupation of the Pale of Calais, the Three Bishoprics and a number of fortresses. For Spain, despite no new gains and the restoration of some occupied territories to France, the peace was a positive result by confirming its control of the Habsburg Netherlands, the Duchy of Milan, and the Kingdoms of Sardinia, Naples, and Sicily. Ferdinand I left the Three Bishoprics under French occupation, but the Netherlands and most of northern Italy remained part of the Holy Roman Empire in the form of imperial fiefs. Furthermore, his position of Holy Roman Emperor was recognized by the Pope, who had refused to do so as long as the war between France and the Habsburgs continued. England fared poorly during the war, and the loss of its last stronghold on the Continent damaged its reputation.

At the end of the conflict, Italy was therefore divided between viceroyalties of the Spanish Habsburgs in the south and the formal fiefs of the Austrian Habsburgs in the north. The imperial states were ruled by the Medici in Tuscany, the Spanish Habsburgs in Milan, the Estensi in Modena, and the House of Savoy in Piedmont (which moved its capital to Turin in 1562). The Kingdoms of Naples, Sicily and Sardinia were under direct rule of the Spanish Habsburgs. The situation continued until the European wars of succession of the 18th century, when northern Italy passed to the Austrian house of Habsburg-Lorraine, and southern Italy passed to the Spanish Bourbons. The Treaty of Cateau-Cambrésis, by bringing Italy into a long period of peace and economic stability (which critics call stagnation) marks the end of the Italian Renaissance and the transition to the Baroque (Vivaldi, Bernini, Caravaggio,... but also Vico, Bruno, Galileo).

=== Religion ===
Some historians have claimed that all signatories of the treaty needed to 'purge their lands of heresy'; in other words, all their subjects had to be forcefully reverted to Catholicism. Visconti (2003), for example, claimed that when pressured by Spain to implement this obligation, Emmanuel Philibert, Duke of Savoy proclaimed the Edict of Nice (15 February 1560), prohibiting Protestantism on pains of a large fine, enslavement or banishment, which soon led to an armed revolt by the Protestant Waldensians in his domain that would last until July 1561.

However, modern historians disagree about the primary motives of Philip II of Spain and especially Henry II of France to conclude the peace treaty. Because Henry II had told the Parlement of Paris that the fight against heresy required all his strength, and he needed to establish peace with Spain, Lucien Romier (1910) argued that besides the great financial troubles, 'that the religious motive of Henry had great, if not decisive, weight'. According to Rainer Babel (2021), that was 'a judgement which later research, with some nuances in detail, has not refuted', but he stated that Bertrand Haan (2010) had 'a deviating interpretation' challenging this consensus. Haan (2010) argued that finances were more important than domestic religious dissension; the fact that the latter was prominent in the 1560s in both France and Spain may have led historians astray in emphasising the role of religion in the 1559 treaty.

Megan Williams (2011) summarised: 'Indeed, Haan contends, it was not the treaty itself but its subsequent justifications which stoked French religious strife. The treaty's priority, he argues, was not a Catholic alliance to extirpate heresy but the affirmation of its signatories' honor and amity, consecrated by a set of dynastic marriages'. According to Haan, there is no evidence of a Catholic alliance between France and Spain to eradicate Protestantism even though some contemporaries have pointed to the treaty's second article to argue such an agreement existed: 'The second article expresses the wish to convene an oecumenical council. People, the contemporaries first, have concluded that the agreement sealed the establishment of a united front of Philip II and Henry II against Protestantism in their states as in Europe. The analysis of the progress of the talks shows that this was not the case'.

Pope Pius V raised the Florentine duke Cosimo de' Medici to Grand Duke of Tuscany in 1569, which was confirmed by the emperor although Philip II of Spain disapproved. Although the papacy's diplomatic role increased during the Wars of Religion, popes and papal legates played no role in negotiating the most significant truces and treaties between the Habsburg and Valois monarchs during these wars.

== Bibliography ==
- Babel, Rainer (2021). "42. Der Frieden von Cateau-Cambrésis 1559". Handbuch Frieden im Europa der Frühen Neuzeit / Handbook of Peace in Early Modern Europe. pp. 857–876. doi:10.1515/9783110591316-042. ISBN 9783110591316. S2CID 234558650. doi:10.1515/9783110591316-042
- Braudel, Fernan (1995) [1949]. The Mediterranean and the Mediterranean World in the Age of Philip II: Volume II. University of California Press. ISBN 978-0520203082.
- Crawford, Katherine (2000). "Catherine de Medici's and the Performance of Political Motherhood". The Sixteenth Century Journal. 31 (3): 643–673. doi:10.2307/2671075. JSTOR 2671075.
- DeVries, Kelly (2010). "Warfare and the International State System". In Tallett, Frank; Trim, D. J. B. (eds.). European Warfare, 1350–1750. Cambridge University Press. ISBN 978-0-521-88628-4.
- Dumont, Jean (1728). Corps universel diplomatique du droit des gens. Tome V. Partie I. Amsterdam/The Hague: Brunel &. p. 599.
- Fett, Denice (2018). "Diligence, secrecy and intrigue; Guido Cavalcanti and the 1559 Treaty of Cateau-Cambrésis". Diplomacy & Statecraft. 29 (3). Taylor & Francis: 372–389. doi:10.1080/09592296.2018.1491442. S2CID 158367073.
- Fraser, Antonia (1994) [1969]. Mary Queen of Scots. Weidenfeld and Nicolson. ISBN 978-0-297-17773-9.
- Haan, Bertrand (2010). Une paix pour l'éternité. La négociation du traité du Cateau-Cambrésis (in French). Casa de Velázquez. ISBN 978-8490961308.
- Kamen, Henry (2003) [2002]. Spain's Road to Empire. Allen Lane. ISBN 978-0140285284.
- Knecht, Robert Jean (1996). The French Wars of Religion 1559–1598. Longman. ISBN 058228533X.
- Knecht, Robert Jean (1998). Catherine De' Medici. Longman. p. 340. ISBN 978-058208242-7.
- Konnert, Mark (2008). Early Modern Europe: The Age of Religious War, 1559–1715. University of Toronto Press. ISBN 978-1-4426-0004-1.
- Mallett, Michael; Shaw, Christine (2014). The Italian Wars 1494–1559: War, State and Society in Early Modern Europe. Pearson Education. ISBN 978-0582057586.
- Parker, Geoffrey, ed. (1997) [1984]. The Thirty Years' War. Routledge. ISBN 978-0-415-12883-4.
- Ridgway, Claire (3 April 2017). "An Overview of the Results of the Treaty of Cateau-Cambrésis 1559". The Tudor Society.
- Setton, Kenneth M (1976). The Papacy and the Levant, 1204–1571 (PDF). American Philosophical Society. ISBN 978-0871691620.
- Vermeir, René; Meulenaere, Vincenzo De (2013). "'To bring good agreement and concord to Christendom' The Conference of Marck (1555) and English neutrality, 1553–1557". Revue du Nord. 3 (401): 681–698. doi:10.3917/rdn.400.0681.
- Visconti, Joseph (2003). The Waldensian Way to God. Xulon Press. pp. 299–300. ISBN 978-1591607922.
- Watkins, John (2017). After Lavinia: A Literary History of Premodern Marriage Diplomacy. Cornell University Press. ISBN 978-1501708510.
- Watkins, John (2018). "Peace of Cateau-Cambrésis (1559)". The Encyclopedia of Diplomacy. pp. 1–5. doi:10.1002/9781118885154.dipl0489
- Wedgwood, C.V. (2005) [1938]. The Thirty Years War. New York Review of Books. ISBN 978-1-59017-146-2.
- Williams, Megan (2011). "Review of: Bertrand Haan, Une paix pour l'éternité: La négociation du traité du Cateau-Cambrésis" (PDF). Renaissance Quarterly. 64 (2). The Renaissance Society of America: 626–628. doi:10.1086/661851. S2CID 164326263.
