= Guillaume Poyet =

French judge (d. 1548)

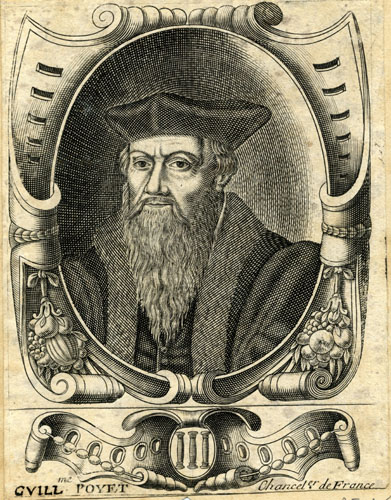
Guillaume Poyet, Chancellor of France from 1538 to 1542

Guillaume Poyet (c. 1473 – April 1548) was a French magistrate born in Angers. After practising successfully as a barrister at Angers and Paris, he was instructed by Louise of Savoy, mother of the king Francis I, to uphold her rights against the constable de Bourbon in 1521. This was the beginning of his fortunes. Through the influence of the queen-mother he obtained the posts of advocate-general (1530) and president of the parliament of Paris (1534), and became chancellor of France in 1538.

He was responsible for the legal reform contained in the Ordinance of Villers-Cotterêts (1539), the object of which was to shorten procedure. This ordered the keeping of registers of baptisms and deaths, and enjoined the exclusive use of the French language in legal procedure. With the constable de Montmorency he organized an intrigue to ruin Admiral Chabot, and procured his condemnation in 1541; but after the admiral was pardoned, Poyet was himself thrown into prison, deprived of his offices, and sentenced to a fine of 100,000 livres.
