= Treaty of Blois (1572) =

1572 treaty between England and France

The Treaty of Blois was signed on 19 April 1572 in Blois between Elizabeth I of England and Catherine de' Medici of France. Based on the terms of the treaty, France and England relinquished their historic rivalry and established an alliance against Spain. The treaty also entailed France to be kept out of Mary, Queen of Scots and Scotland's affair with England. Elizabeth expected the defensive treaty to isolate Spain and prevent France from invading Flanders.

== Sources ==
- Harper, Sally (2005). 'A Dittie to the tune of Welsh Sydannen': a Welsh image of Queen Elizabeth. Renaissance Studies: Volume 19, Issue 2, pp. 201-228.
- Martin, Lynn A. (Summer, 1980). Papal Policy and the European Conflict, 1559-1572. Sixteenth Century Journal: Volume 11, No. 2, Catholic Reformation, pp. 35–48.

== See also ==
- List of treaties
