= Bayonne Interview =

1565 Franco-Spanish royal meeting

Bayonne Interview Bayonne Meeting, Bayonne Conference
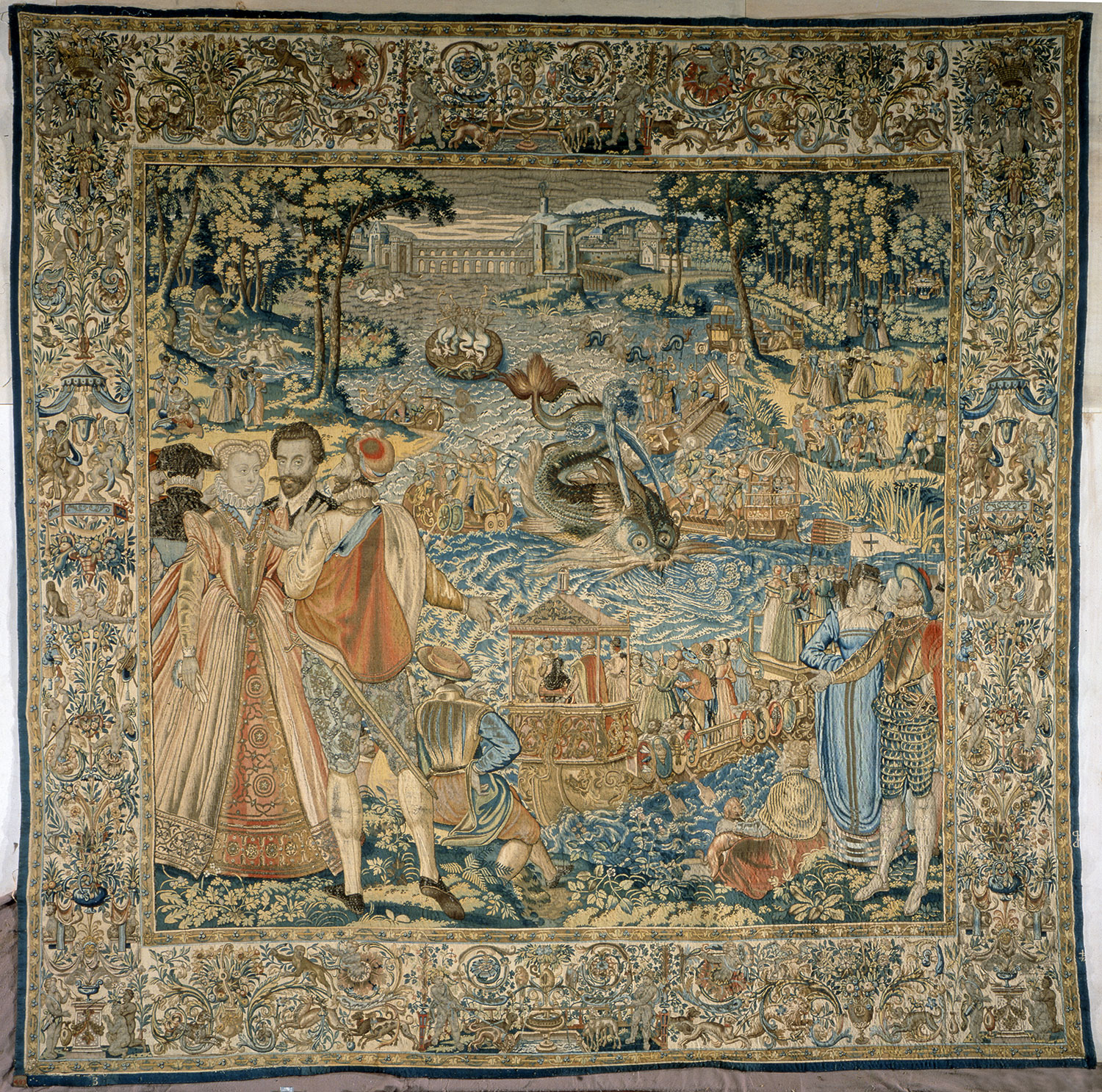
- Valois tapestry illustrating the celebrations at Bayonne
- Host country: Kingdom of France
- Date: 15 June - 2 July 1565
- Cities: Bayonne, Kingdom of France
- Participants: (Kingdom of France) Charles IX (Kingdom of France) Catherine de' Medici (Spanish Empire) Élisabeth of Valois (Spanish Empire) Fernando Álvarez de Toledo, 3rd Duke of Alba
- Follows: Treaty of Cateau-Cambrésis

The Bayonne Interview (French: Entrevue de Bayonne, Spanish: Entrevista de Bayona) was a meeting in June 1565 between king Charles IX of France and his mother Catherine de' Medici; and the Spanish queen Élisabeth of Valois and the royal favourite Fernando Álvarez de Toledo, 3rd Duke of Alba. Plans for a meeting between the French and Spanish crown stretched back to the peace between the two kingdoms in 1559. For the years that followed, the French crown, and in particular Catherine, would campaign for a meeting between king Charles and the Spanish king Philip II, but Philip proved evasive. Finally in 1565, Spanish consent was granted for the meeting, but Philip himself declined to participate alongside his wife, sending the duke of Alba in his stead.

The Spanish hoped to see a change in French religious policy derive from the Bayonne Interview, the French crown currently affording a limited toleration to Protestantism in the kingdom, something that was disagreeable to the Spanish. Catherine meanwhile hoped to use the meeting to strengthen the bonds between France and Spain through the conclusion of new marriage arrangements. To the end of anti-Protestantism, Philip insisted that the leading Protestant magnates, Louis I, Prince of Condé, and Jeanne d'Albret the queen of Navarre be absent from the meeting, something that the French relented on.

The time at Bayonne was divided between idle festivities and serious negotiations. Banquets, feasts, masquerades and tournaments were used to advertise French magnificence to the Spanish crown. At the negotiating table, Élisabeth and the duke of Alba pressed Catherine to commit to an anti-Protestant policy, but Catherine was evasive, wanting Spanish assurances relating to her marital program, and a pan-Catholic League. Little of consequence would ultimately be agreed at the meeting, Catherine only providing a vague promise on some future resolution, and the Spanish likewise promising to look into the marriage proposals. Philip rejected the idea of the marriages, and a pan-Catholic league. Catherine meanwhile failed to deliver an anti-Protestant policy.

For the Protestants, excluded from the meeting, paranoia led them to dark conclusions about what had been agreed at Bayonne. They imagined an alliance to crush French Protestantism had been established, and after the St. Bartholomew's Day massacre, the Bayonne Interview would be retrofitted as the origin point of the plot.

== Seeking a meeting ==
=== Early efforts ===
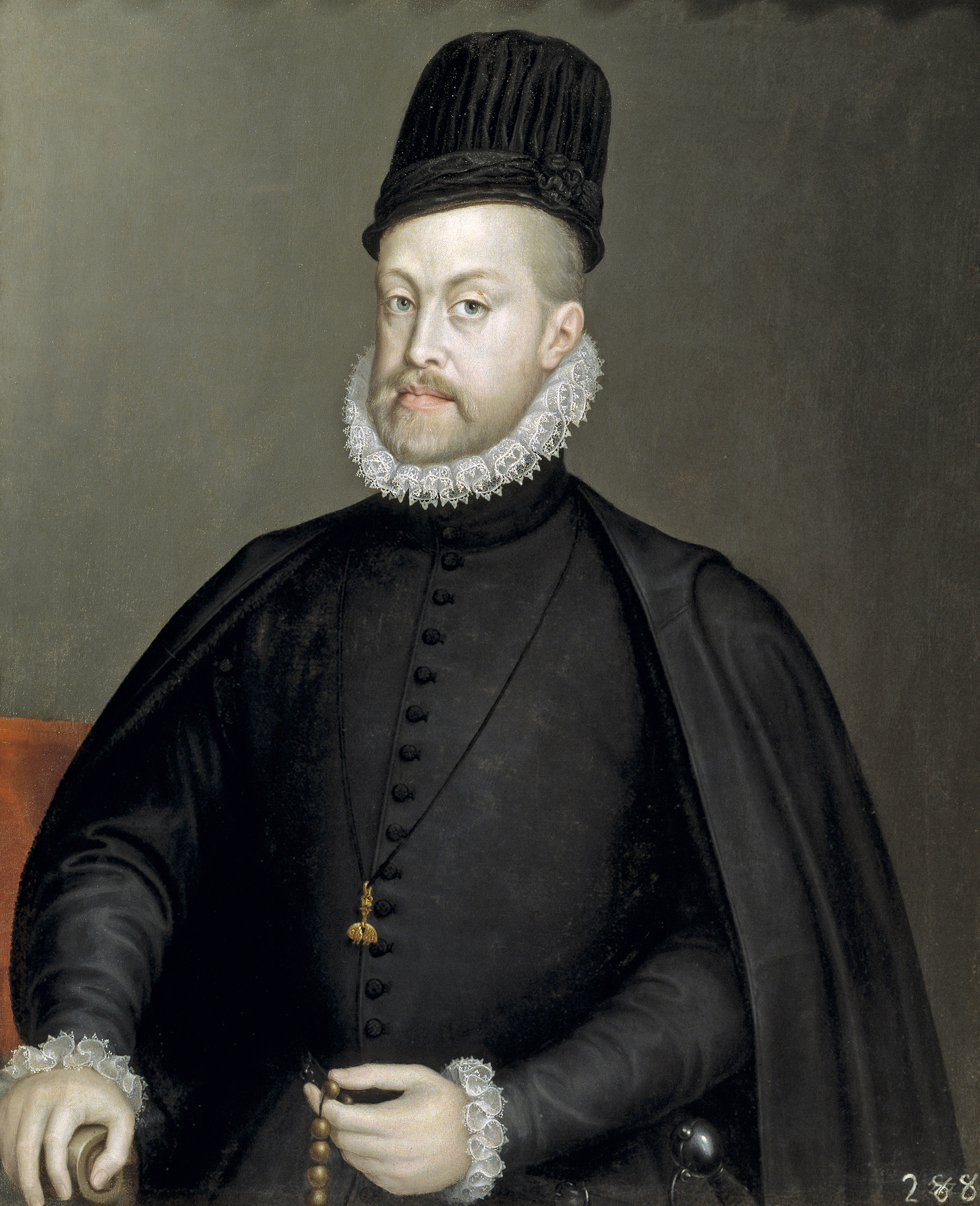
Philip II, king of Spain at the time of the Bayonne Interview

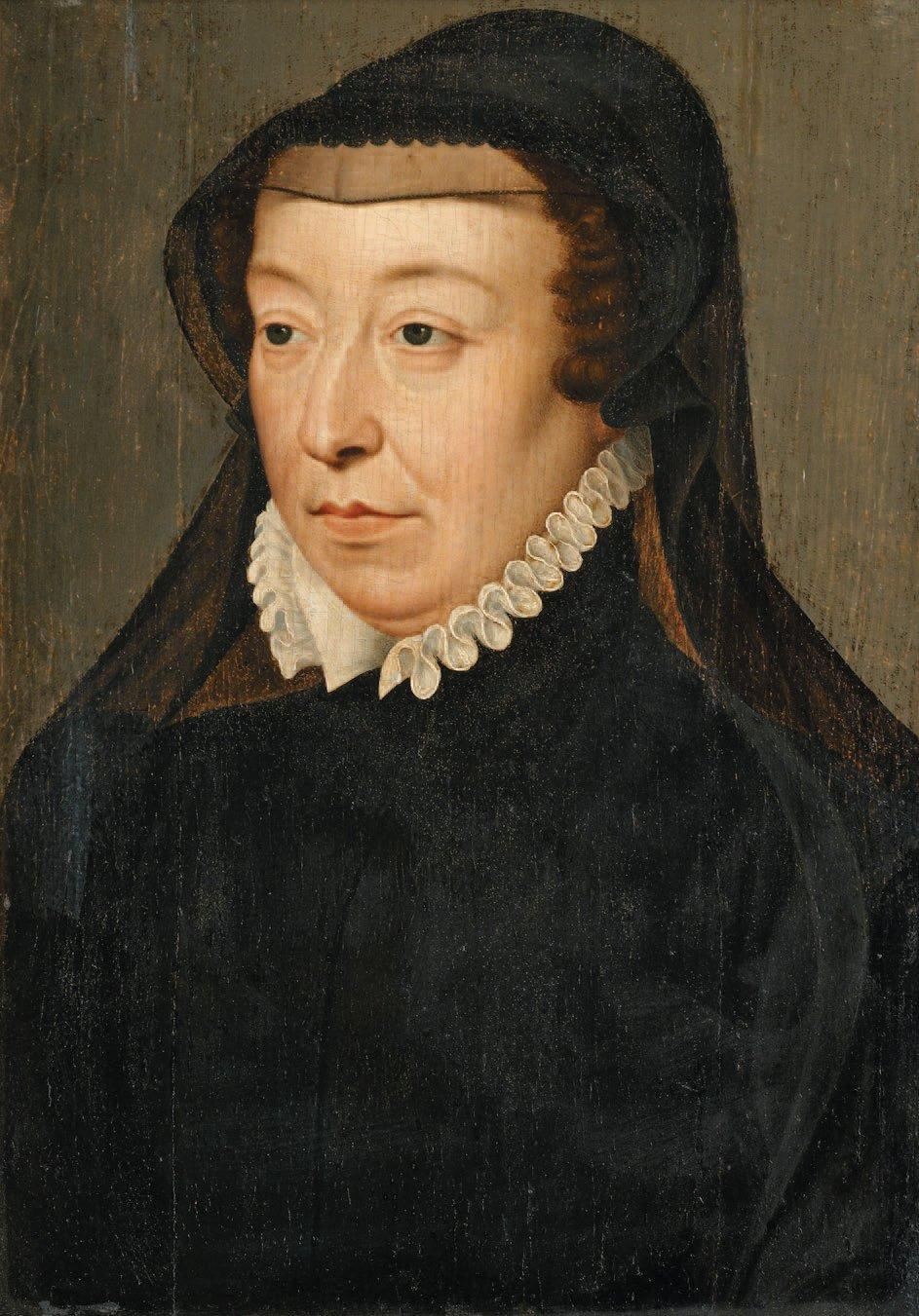
Catherine de' Medici, queen mother of Francee, and keenest advocate for a royal Franco-Spanish meeting

The first discussions for a meeting between the French and Spanish sovereigns emerged in the negotiations of the peace of Cateau-Cambrésis in 1559. It was a prospect raised by the captive French constable de Montmorency. It would take the matrimonial alliances agreed to between the two kingdoms as part of the peace to a higher level of integration. The two men who embodied the heart of their respective kingdoms would be seen to demonstrate the great bond between them. The idea would subsequently appear in ambassadorial correspondence in the months after the signing of the treaty of Cateau-Cambrésis in 1559.

The queen mother, Catherine, then took up the baton of this idea first in 1560, when she began to press for it with some insistence. On 28 July 1560, the prospect featured in a letter she wrote to the French ambassador in Spain, the bishop of Limoges. In this correspondence she alluded to prior conversations on the matter but noted that present circumstances meant that she desired a delay in the meeting. In another letter of the same day, she proposed a timetable for the meeting of the next spring (i.e. Spring 1561) and apologised for the continued troubles inside France. The cardinal de Lorraine also supported this project, writing on Catherine's enthusiasm for the idea in June 1560, but felt it would be inadvisable to make the trip to the southern border during winter. The bishop of Limoges was tasked with convincing the Spanish of this delay in the proposal.

This early correspondence was delivered not only to the bishop himself, but also to those around the Spanish queen, Élisabeth, daughter of Catherine and sister of the French king Francis II. Élisabeth had been married to the Spanish sovereign as a term of the treaty of Cateau-Cambrésis that sealed the peace and friendship between the two nations in 1559. She was beloved both of the Spanish people and her husband, king Philip II, and served as a tool in the diplomatic arsenal of the French ambassadors to Spain. Chief in Élisabeth's household was a certain madame de Clermont. In November 1560, she was propositioned to inquire with Limoges about the progress of the project. The bishop wrote to Catherine in this month, noting the various difficulties the project faced, but assuring her of Philip's affections. In particular, he highlighted the opposition of the Spanish favourite, the duke of Alba to such an interview, among other figures. By contrast, Philip's other chief favourite, the prince of Éboli was favourable to the project. He suggested the best time for the plan would be when Philip visited Barcelona, something that was a year and a half away, and at this time a distant hypothetical. This distant assessment was furthered in a correspondence of 9 December in which the bishop of Limoges informed Catherine that due to the ill health of Philip's son, don Carlos, a delay of several years must be anticipated.

In an undated letter to her daughter, Élisabeth, Catherine wrote that she intended to revive the idea of a royal meeting with the duke of Alba. The queen mother knew there was opposition to the project.

It was known since 1560, thanks to the affirmation of Philip and the duke of Alba, that Philip would be travelling to Monzón (a northern town fairly near to the Pyrenees). Since his accession to the Spanish throne in 1556, he had not yet been acclaimed as king by the Cortes (a general assembly), and thus this needed to be undertaken.

=== Death of Francis II ===
Charles IX, king of France from 1560, and brother to the Spanish queen Élisabeth of Valois

The death of the young French king Francis in December 1560, elevated Catherine to a position of pre-eminence in France as regent of the kingdom for her son Charles IX. The importance of the Spanish interview project grew as a source of legitimation for her regime. Yet, over the next year little progress towards the project was made, In January 1561, Philip noted to the bishop of Limoges that the prospect was 'full of thorns'. Come January 1562, the bishop of Limoges could do little but assure the French court that if the interview did occur (something the Spanish king allegedly 'greatly desired'), it would still be several months from now when the sovereign was in Monzón. Philip would first finish his meeting with the Cortes and then meet with Catherine at the border.

Philip became more comfortable to make this assurance now, due to changes in the French kingdom, with the king of Navarre having moved towards the orthodox Catholic camp. He also experienced the encouragement of his ambassador in France, Chantonnay. Philip's approval of these domestic changes could be indicated by an assent to the meeting. With the bishop of Limoges soon to be recalled, Catherine needled him to get more precise commitments out of Philip. Limoges could not attain this before his departure.

According to a series of letter of the cardinal Santa Croce to cardinal Borromeo around February-March 1562 the plan was for a meeting to first transpire between Philip and the king of Navarre before following this up with a meeting between Philip and Charles/Catherine. This would transpire at Perpignan, and the French court would come south via Moulins and Lyon. The constable de Montmorency was opposed to this plan on security grounds. The cancellation of Philip's 1562 plans to attend the Cortes, and the outbreak of the first French War of Religion in April, sunk these prospects for the moment.

=== Post civil war revival of talks ===
In July 1563, as Philip prepared to undertake the trip to Aragon, for the occasion of the Cortes, the prince of Éboli highlighted to the new French ambassador, the seigneur de Saint-Sulpice that such a visit to the border would be an opportune moment for a meeting. The historian Haan argues that dangling the prospect of the meeting was a tactic by which the Spanish hoped to extract a more Catholic domestic policy out of Catherine in return for an international meeting. Catherine likewise looked to see if the visit to Monzón might afford a chance of the two sovereigns meeting. She wrote to her daughter, the queen of Spain, in October 1563, asking her to intervene with her husband favourably towards this project. At this time, she had recently recovered from a great illness and wrote that if she could just meet Philip for an hour, she could then die content. She also passed a letter through the Spanish ambassador in France, Álava to Philip himself, requesting for a meeting between the two crowns. She emphasised not only the happiness it would give her, but also the good it could do for the service of god.

The enthusiasm was not equally shared by both crowns, and when Philip visited Monzón, Élisabeth remained in Madrid. The seigneur de Saint-Sulpice quickly put together that her absence meant the meeting would not transpire. Hoping to see the interview come to pass, he implored the Spanish court to bring Élisabeth with them to Monzón, arguing it was improper for Philip to come to the place without his wife. Saint-Sulpice maintained a regular correspondence with Élisabeth while the king was in Monzón and wrote to Catherine on his desire for her to come to Monzón.

Pending the prospect of Saint-Sulpice's success in this endeavour, Catherine indicated her readiness to make for Languedoc for the purpose of this interview and continued to express hopefulness to Saint-Sulpice about the prospect in November 1563. By secret despatch of 25 November, Saint-Sulpice wrote to Charles that the Spanish ambassador in France, Álava, had discussed the interview with Philip, but had received no response. The French ambassador had therefore spoken with the Spanish sovereign to gauge his intentions, and Philip had stated that a royal meeting was agreeable to him and he would soon offer a timetable for when it might happen. In every letter to the Spanish crown during this period, Catherine expressed her hope for an interview between the sovereigns. Philip allowed her to maintain this hope, assuring her that once the Cortes (which lasted several months) was at its end, he would inform her of his intentions. He offered no commitment. Saint-Sulpice saw that the whole matter was a ruse from the Spanish, and that the keener Catherine made herself appear, the less interested the Spanish king was.

However, come 12 December 1563, Élisabeth wrote to Saint-Sulpice to express her regret that she would not be able to meet with her brother and mother (Charles and Catherine). Saint-Sulpice pressed Philip to commit more fully, but found him evasive, the king only stating that he desired for this matter to be undertaken with secrecy. Something he imparted to the French court on 17 December. Pessimistic, Saint-Sulpice imagined that after the conclusion of the Cortes, Philip would go first to Barcelona, and then back to Madrid.

=== Diluted proposal ===
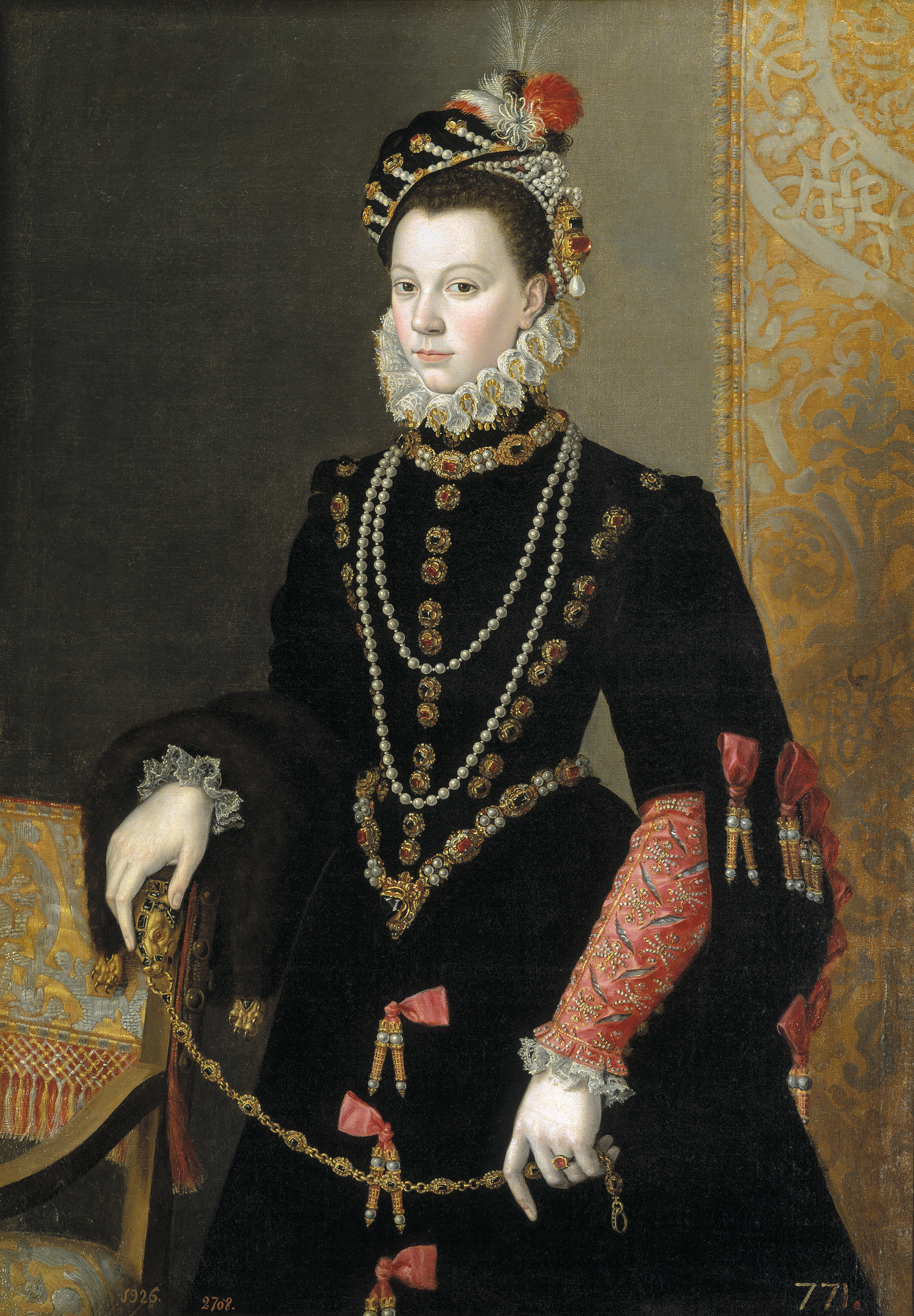
Élisabeth of Valois, queen of Spain, who would attend the Bayonne Interview in the absence of her husband Philip II

Still clinging on to the prospect, Catherine again reached out to her daughter around the end of 1563, asking her to get the prince of Éboli or duke of Alba on board with the scheme. Alba was however entirely in opposition to the proposal and wrote to Philip on this effect by letter of 22 December 1563. For Alba, Catherine's religious position was a known quantity, she would not tear up the edict of Amboise (the peace edict that brough the civil war to a close and provided a limited toleration to Protestantism). However, if she explained the reasoning for the meeting, a private gathering with Élisabeth as opposed to Philip might be productive in getting her to change her councillors. A meeting with Philip was out of the question due to the repercussions such an event would have. In January therefore, Philip in principle came to agree with the possibility of a meeting between Catherine and Élisabeth.

Élisabeth found little success in campaigning for the French proposal and appraised Saint-Sulpice on 10 January that she had despaired of the prospect of convincing her husband to favour the scheme. During January, Saint-Sulpice advised Catherine that it would be prudent to moderate her interest in the prospect. This was followed in February 1564, when the French ambassador advised Catherine that they needed to go easy on the campaign for the interview, and should not keep raising it with Philip. The prince of Éboli nevertheless assured the French that while the interview would not happen now, this was a postponement, not a cancellation.

Álava undertook an audience with Catherine on 23 February 1564 in which he assured her, as had Éboli, that Philip did indeed desire to meet with her. The Spanish king was concerned however, with the thought doing so might ignite jealousy and anxiety from other Christian princes. Therefore, Philip wished to know more specifically what Catherine hoped to discuss at such an interview. This approach by Álava reflected that which he had been given in his diplomatic instructions before taking up the posting. Philip had told Álava to pry on this point, so that it might be determined what solution Philip could offer her.

The queen mother replied that the project would afford the possibility to strengthen the peace between them, quash disputes that had arisen, and make clear to other princes the power of the Franco-Spanish alliance. It would also allow her to impart things that could only be said directly to him. Álava protested that Philip had put his trust in him, and that Catherine should feel free to do the same. Catherine laughed at this, saying that she trusted Álava totally. Not stated to Álava were her more genuine hopes that she might convince the Spanish sovereign of the merits of the French religious policy of toleration if given the chance to converse with him one-on-one. Further, as Haan states, to 'exploit her understanding of Philip'. Writing to her ambassador on 26 February, she opined that Álava's attitude made her think Philip was not actually interested in a meeting. Saint-Sulpice was to keep his ear to the ground in Spain, meanwhile Catherine wrote to Élisabeth again to try and sell the interview to her. The historian Ribera sees Philip's attitude as one of dissimulation, feigning openness to a royal meeting while in fact working against the project.

The queen mother would follow the advice of her ambassador and cooled her attention for the meeting project. This succeeded in fooling Álava into believing Catherine had lost her enthusiasm for the interview. In September, she wrote to her daughter, Élisabeth, on the matter again. This indirect approach had the benefit of making her seem less desperate for an interview than had she instructed her ambassador to broach the matter with Philip directly.

=== Serious prospect ===
Despite this, Catherine remained determined, and her ambassador in Spain, dexterous. The strategy of apparent disinterest that Catherine had adopted upon the advice of her ambassador early in the year, paid off. It would be the Spanish that reached out on the prospect. The start of the French royal tour of the kingdom had afforded new possibilities for a border meeting. Come 21 November 1564, Saint-Sulpice narrated in a secret despatch of an audience he had enjoyed with the Spanish king. Philip had inquired of him, where the royal family would be by the winter. Having seen a clear opening, Saint-Sulpice explained that the court would be visiting Narbonne, Bayonne, and Toulouse. Overall though he maintained a cool façade as to French enthusiasm for the potential interview this might enable.

Saint-Sulpice followed this up with a further communique in December, in which he explained that he had done his all to illustrate to Philip the advantages of such a meeting. Philip had in fact asked him to broach the matter with Élisabeth, and then secretly with Catherine. Though Philip seemed to be coming around, the duke of Alba remained reticent, and Saint-Sulpice attempted to assuage his concerns on the matter of the anxieties among other princes it would inspire. The ambassador justified it on the grounds of the relations of the two families, meaning that such a meeting would not be untoward.

=== Monluc's parallel campaign ===
The lieutenant-general of Languedoc, the seigneur de Monluc was also keen to see a meeting between Catherine and the Spanish sovereign come to pass. For him, it was an opportunity for the two crowns to unite their struggle against Protestantism and ensure peace between the kingdoms. Monluc had a low opinion on the French ambassador to Spain, considering him to be a 'heretic'. Thus by removing him as an intermediary between the two monarchs with a direct meeting, progress against Protestantism could be made. To this end, he propositioned the Spanish agent Juan de Bardaxí about the prospect of arranging such a meeting in May 1564, undertook discussions with Spanish ministers, and wrote a long memoir concerning the state of France in October 1564.

His proposed tonic to the religious situation was not a violent one. Monluc drew up a harsh draft edict concerning Protestantism which he showed to the cardinal de Lorraine. He also received an embassy from the duke of Alba. He emphasised that Catherine had undertaken the Grand Tour of the kingdom to illustrate the seriousness of the courts Catholicity, and to disarm the Protestant places, as had been done at Lyon. Philip II must encourage this approach from the crown. Despite this important role, he would not mention these events in his own memoires, out of fear it might prove compromising. Brunet credits the reports Philip received from Monluc with convincing Philip of the necessity of a royal meeting.

In his June memorandum and a letter of 27 October 1564 to Juan de Bardaxí, Monluc advised Philip to insist on a select cast of figures for a royal meeting. Not only should he prohibit Protestant attendees but also those who might appear on the surface to be Catholic. In terms of acceptable grandees for Philip to outline to Catherine he named the duc de Montpensier, the cardinals de Bourbon and de Guise, the maréchal de Bourdillon, the comte de Sanssac, the seigneur de Damville, and the seigneur de Sipierre. Monluc would also be open to an invite himself. Beyond matters of invitees, Monluc counselled Philip do his utmost to convey his friendship for Charles, as a way of counteracting the malfeasant presence of the chancellor L'Hôpital in the royal council. Élisabeth should instil in her Mother and Brother the understanding that they were put on this earth as monarchs by the will of god. Protestantism could accomplish little but reduce France to a republic. The reason nobles supported Protestantism was to dilute the royal power, expanding their own under a republican model.

When analysing the change in the Spanish attitude towards the meeting, Haan argues that in the context of the developing situation in the Spanish Netherlands, it was becoming increasingly important to Philip to receive assurances from the French government of its efforts against heresy. Further, it would afford the prospect of strengthening bonds with French Catholic leaders, such as the seigneur de Monluc. In a meeting therefore, Philip could explain to Catherine the measures that must be taken against Protestantism and appraise her of what support she could receive for the execution of these measures from the Spanish.

The wheels of progress on the project were now turning, and in a memorandum to the French court of 21 January, Saint-Sulpice discussed a meeting he had with the duke of Alba and Philip. In this meeting, Saint-Sulpice had proposed that Élisabeth come to Bayonne to meet with Catherine and Charles, meanwhile Alba proposed that Catherine enter Spain for the meeting. The French ambassador dismissed this counterproposal on the grounds that it was not proper for a mother to travel to meet her daughter. The selection of Bayonne by the French had the advantage of being near the border with Spain, it also served as a key place for international trade and diplomatic movement between the two kingdoms. In addition to these points, its selection would allow Charles to remain within a kingdom in which he exercised sovereignty. The historian Jouanna argues that the only proper time for a sovereign to leave their domain was in an offensive capacity.

== Spanish consent ==
On 23 November 1564, the Spanish council of state resolved to go ahead with the royal interview.

Alba informed the seigneur de Saint-Sulpice around this time, that it was naïve to imagine that France could solve the troubles that best it without Spanish help.

On 30 January 1565, Philip publicly assented to his wife undertaking a trip to Bayonne, but apologised that he himself would not be able to accompany her. The reason given in the minutes of the meeting was Philip's fear of the Protestant reaction to such a trip. The timetable for this meeting at Bayonne would be for it to transpire on 8 April. Ribera sees Philip's dismissal of his own involvement in the meeting as a tactical one, allowing him to retain freedom of action concerning a meeting over which he had much suspicion, but also to attend at the head of the party if he saw fit in the end. Saint-Sulpice well recognised that the meeting occurring without the presence of Philip deprived the occasion of much of its significance. Rather than a meeting between sovereigns, it would now be a 'family meeting'. Catherine would no longer have a chance to convince Philip of French religious policy face-to-face. It also robbed the occasion of much of its pomp.

On 6 February, Philip outlined to his former ambassador to France, Chantonnay, who was then serving Philip in Germany, that he would be absent from the meeting. He explained that he had great wish to meet his 'brother' Charles, and the Queen Mother, and allow them to see his wife/their relative, Élisabeth again. Unfortunately, he was always consumed with pressing matters, and thus while he would consent to Élisabeth's travel, he would not be able to come himself. Champion sees a more religious angle between the lines of Philip's absenteeism, Philip not wanting to associate with the 'impure' French.

Though Philip was now only a potential part of the meeting, Saint-Sulpice could rest on his laurels of having secured agreement for the interview to happen in Bayonne. With great pride, on 21 January, he wrote on his triumph on this point to a whole host of leading French nobles (the cardinal de Bourbon, the constable de Montmorency, the prince de La Roche-sur-Yon and the chancellor L'Hôpital among others). In his letter to the cardinal de Châtillon he derided the idea that Catherine might have had to travel into Spain to meet with her daughter as an idea so poor that it was not even worthy to be discussed.

Around this time, Catherine was to be found stalled in front of Carcassonne, writing with anticipation to Saint-Sulpice to find out whether Philip had consented to the interview. In a letter to Philip, she expressed her joy at the thought of meeting him and her daughter, as well as the good friendship in which she held the Spaniard. To make clear the ties between them, the letter was signed "vostre bonne mère et sœur Caterine" (your good mother and sister Catherine). She similarly wrote to her daughter, expressing her optimism that an interview might strengthen the bond between the two crowns.

=== French receive the news ===
It was not until the court arrived in Toulouse in February, that Catherine learned that the interview at Bayonne was to go ahead. Very pleased, she began to dress in the Spanish fashion and purchased jewellery that she might offer as gifts. She remained hopeful that Philip himself might make an appearance at the meeting, despite the ambiguous nature of this particular point.

Meeting with the Spanish ambassador shortly after receiving this news, she inquired of his opinion on the fact of the interview. In a single word response Álava indicated his approval. Catherine was not satisfied with this and pressed him to elaborate. He expressed the opinion Philip himself would not come, unless it was clear the meeting would advance the service of god. Inquiring as to what Álava meant in this regard, the Ambassador elaborated that Catherine must cease to take the advice of the treasonous and Protestants, who desired injury of the crown. Catherine assured him that they did not listen to such advisers. Álava stated that Philip had concerns, causing Catherine to interrupt, inquiring if something were awry in Spain. Álava clarified that the problem was not in Spain but rather Flanders. To this, the Queen Mother expressed that she was already aware of the serious situation in the Netherlands. The Spanish ambassador was caught off guard by this and inquired as to why she had not informed him of this. Catherine then moved the conversation back to the arrangements for Bayonne, commenting on the small entourage of Élisabeth. Catherine noted she and Charles would likewise bring only a limited entourage. She stated that Philip could come close to Bayonne, where Charles would go out to find him. Álava was sceptical that Bayonne was a suitable site for the meeting and similarly disbelieving of the paired down French entourage.

Reporting to Philip, Álava stated happily that the news of the meeting had been dispiriting to the prince de La Roche-sur-Yon (who hoped to marry Charles to the princess of Portugal) as well as the constable de Montmorency and the chancellor.

Catherine's considerable gratitude for the decision of Philip to allow his wife to come to Bayonne and meet with the French court was expressed in a letter to the king. She noted that the meeting would be advantageous to the 'peace of Christendom'. On 3 February, she wrote to the duke of Jülich to share the good news of the approval of the meeting. Preparations began immediately, with Catherine undertaking large loans from the Gondi-du Perron bank (580,000 écus - crowns) and the Lyon bankers (130,000 écus) so that she might best be able to demonstrate the grandeur of the French court for the occasion.

The coming interview was publicly announced in Spain on 30 January. The news was greeted with caution, people hoping it would come to pass without scandal.

=== Preparations begin ===
Catherine began preparations for the Bayonne meeting at once. She dispatched representatives to Bayonne from Toulouse to prepare lodgings for Élisabeth and take stock of provisions. She also drew up a list of those of her Catholic ladies who would accompany her. The young duc d'Orléans (brother to the king and future king Henri III) coveted a role for himself to play in the meeting, by fetching his sister from Tolosa.

On 8 February 1565, a letter was sent to Juan de Bardaxí, which flattered Monluc with complete credit for the coming to pass of the meeting. Philip wrote similarly directly to Monluc.

Catherine also began to write to several of the kingdom's other ambassadors, to take the temperature on how the interview would be received at their courts. Thus, the sieur d'Oysel in Rome, and du Ferrier in Venice among others were called upon. Du Ferrier was to put his ear to the ground to see what everyone was saying about the development. The sieur d'Oysel wrote to Saint-Sulpice to let him know of pope Pius IV's pleasure at the meeting, and his desire to see Philip himself come to the interview. In this letter of 24 February, Oysel also complemented Saint-Sulpice for 'ending his tenure as ambassador to Spain with such an accomplishment'.

A rumour spread that Élisabeth would not attend a meeting after all as she had become pregnant. In this circumstance, so the rumour went, Philip did not wish for his wife to travel. Álava believed this rumour was a product of Catherine's, designed to assuage the fears of the Protestants.

At a feast on 20 February, Charles summoned Álava to him and explained that he was burning with need to see his sister.

According to Champion, on route to the royal camp (where he was to witness Charles running the ring), Álava was informed that Catherine intended to resolve religious affairs in the kingdom after the Bayonne meeting. The form this would take was unknown to Álava's informants, but they suspected the expelling of Protestant ministers from the kingdom. Álava was sceptical, raising the prospect of chancellor L'Hôpital's influence. He further queried how resolute the constable de Montmorency would be if his Protestant nephews were seized.

=== Queen of Navarre/Prince de Condé invite trouble ===
In March, a potential spanner was thrown into the works. The duke of Alba informed Saint-Sulpice that it was the intention of Philip that certain undesirable persons, in particular the Protestant queen of Navarre, would not be present at Bayonne. Álava was similarly tasked by Philip and the duke of Alba with clearly enunciating to Catherine that neither the Protestant prince de Condé nor the queen of Navarre should be present.

Should it prove necessary, the threat of Élisabeth's non-attendance could be held above Catherine's head. The French ambassador assured the duke of Alba that Catherine would ensure those present were to Philip's liking. Saint-Sulpice was not so easily defeated however, and in a conversation with Élisabeth stressed that such restrictions were not in accordance with the friendly relations between France and Spain. He hoped for a greater patience and charity to be displayed by those around the Spanish sovereign. He further feared that the exclusion of the Protestants from the meeting would have worrying domestic implications in France. It was the hope of Saint-Sulpice, that the Protestants prohibited from making an appearance could be limited to four men (the queen of Navarre, the prince de Condé, the admiral de Coligny and the cardinal de Châtillon), but he made no progress in this compromise.

In a letter to the sieur d'Oysel, sent on 11 March, Saint-Sulpice expressed his ambition that all those who wished for strong Franco-Spanish relations be present at Bayonne so that the meeting might produce the maximum impact.

Come 16 March, Saint-Sulpice was able to inform Charles that Élisabeth was raring to depart, and that Philip was going to Burgos. The ambassador would head out in front of Élisabeth by a couple of days. As for the prospect of the duc d'Orléans meeting with her in Spain, he advised the duc go no further than Tolosa rather than to Vitoria, due to the poor roads.

Saint-Sulpice then informed the French crown that the actual departure of the Queen was delayed due to the tardiness of don Juan Manrique de Lara who was in charge of her progress to Bayonne. In the same letter, he noted to Catherine that Philip was again stressing the matter of the presence of Protestant grandees at the interview, in particular the prince de Condé and the queen of Navarre. Not only was their Protestantism an offence to god, but it would be impossible for Élisabeth to recognise the queen of Navarre (or as Philip described her mme. de Vendôme) without prejudicing her own rights over the kingdom of Navarre (much of which was in Spanish hands after the conquest of 1513). Saint-Sulpice protested to Élisabeth that their exclusion, beyond being insulting, would convince them the meeting contained ill designs for them. Thus, a meeting for the bringing of peace would instead sow discord. Élisabeth was supposedly convinced of the merit of Saint-Sulpice's arguments and promised to intervene with Philip on the matter.

==== Sending Alba ====
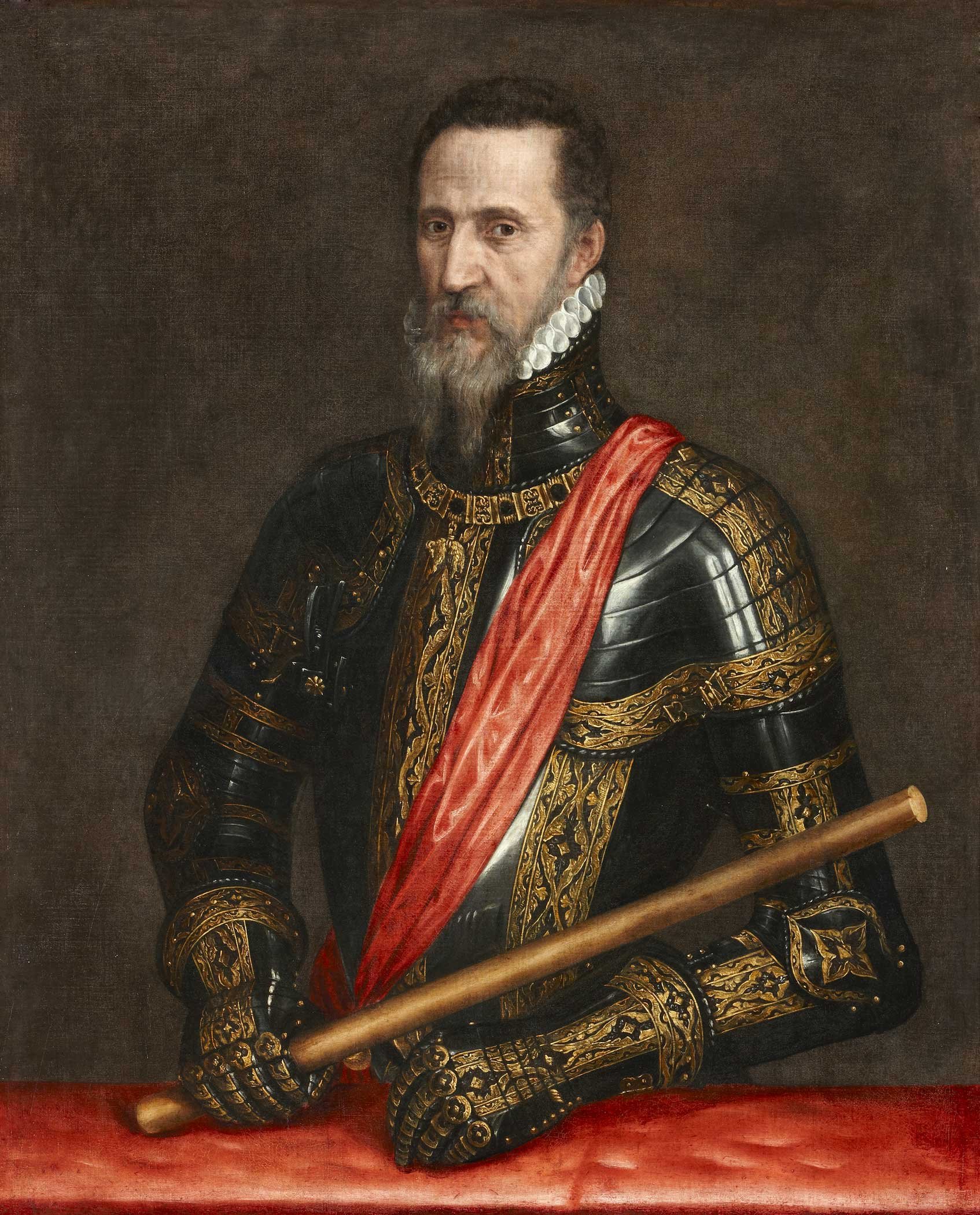
Fernando Álvarez de Toledo, 3rd Duke of Alba, royal Spanish favourite entrusted by Philip II with advocating for a change in French religious policy at Bayonne in the King's stead

In a letter of the same day to the chancellor, Saint-Sulpice projected an arrival for Élisabeth at Bayonne as being in mid-May. Alongside Élisabeth for the meeting at Bayonne would be the duke of Alba, Juan Manrique de Lara, the duke of Benevente and Fernando de Toledo. The decision to send Alba to the interview, as opposed to the far more Francophile prince of Éboli, sent a clear signal about Philip's attitude towards France. Édouard suggests that Alba was a last minute replacement for Éboli, having been selected to supplant the latter's position in the meeting only in March. Champion opines that Alba was sacrificing himself to protect his master (Philip) from having to visit France by undertaking the trip in his stead, something he places in a pattern of Alba's behaviour.

Alba was given precise instructions for the meeting. He was to lobby for Catherine to start a campaign against Protestantism. This was to be accomplished with the expelling of their pastors, the prohibition of Protestant worship, the publication of the Tridentine decrees in France, and the requirement of a profession of Catholic faith for entry into public office.

When he learned of the choice of Alba in April, Saint-Sulpice was very much regretful of this decision by the Spanish. It also represented a setback for the prince of Éboli, who had been the chief Spanish minister championing the project of a meeting to begin with.

The matter of Philip's objection to the presence of the Protestants was again elaborated upon by Saint-Sulpice in his letter to the chancellor. The list of specifically excluded Protestants was longer, including the queen of Navarre, the prince de Condé, the admiral de Coligny and the cardinal de Châtillon. In Philip's estimation, were they to be in Bayonne alongside Élisabeth it would be a cause for scandal among other Christian princes. Élisabeth herself would be distressed, and the Protestant grandees made discontent. Philip therefore thought it would be no great trouble for them to absent themselves from court for a couple of days. Saint-Sulpice imparted the above suggestion from Philip in the hopes that L'Hôpital would in a wise way look to ensure conflagration in France was avoided.

==== Getting the Spanish on the road ====
To the frustration of Saint-Sulpice, preparations on the Spanish side continued at a glacial pace. He opined that the Spanish were not used to travelling. The delays concerned him, as until the Spanish party got underway, he feared the meeting could not be guaranteed to go ahead. He updated the French court on 29 March, that the Spanish were intending to leave Madrid on 6 April. On 3 April, he informed the French court that the Spanish departure had been delayed a further three days. He assured Charles that he had emphasised the dangers of delays to the Spanish, as the Queen would be forced to return from Bayonne in the full heat of the summer. Confident in his own abilities, he imagined that thanks to his needling, he had avoided a further two months of delays. He was happy to report that the military moves of the Ottoman's did not appear to have had an effect on the progress of things.

Before his own departure for Bayonne, Saint-Sulpice had enjoyed a meeting with Philip. He summarised this meeting in the same letter of 3 April. He had affirmed and illustrated the good value of the Bayonne meeting to Philip. He touched on the sensitive matter of the Protestant presence at the meeting, opining he believed the queen of Navarre would submit to Catherine, and that to reject Condé's presence would be to insult him, and would inflame religious tensions in France. In Catherine's eyes, Condé's absenting would signal to the Protestants that some design to their injury was being discussed at Bayonne. Philip rejoindered that their presence was intolerable to him, and that he would come in for reproach for permitting his wife to converse with Protestants.

In the end, the only Protestant present at Bayonne would be the German prince, Philip von Salm, count of the Rhinegrave.

Champion records a conversation between the seigneur de Monluc and Spanish ambassador Álava which is to have transpired in Agen. Monluc assured Álava that if Catherine was not true to her word as to the religious product of the meeting, he would enter the Spanish king's service.

According to English records of 11 April, the admiral de Coligny met with the queen of Navarre in that month to discuss the upcoming Bayonne conference, and what the meeting might mean for Protestantism in France.

For the strongly Catholic duc de Montpensier, who was then following the French court, it was only the prospect of the upcoming Bayonne interview that kept him from withdrawing from the court. Álava later wrote that Montpensier assured him that if the product of the conference was not the expulsion of Protestants from France he would enter Philip's service in favour of the Catholic faith, and would live in a Spanish town of Philip's choosing.

== Journey to Bayonne ==
=== Spanish travel ===
Finally, on 12 April, Saint-Sulpice was able to announce that the queen of Spain had made her departure from Madrid, having left the city three days prior. Élisabeth's departure from the Spanish capital was an occasion for much sadness in the city, a crowd seeing her off from Alcazar square. Saint-Sulpice preceded the Queen on her journey, but left one of his men with her so that he could be made aware of any incidents on the journey. Élisabeth's convoy made slow progress, covering only a few places each day. Saint-Sulpice reported to Catherine on 12 April that everywhere Élisabeth arrived she was greeted with great enthusiasm. The residents of Medina del Campo had devoted 60,000 ducats to her reception. The emissary of the duke of Ferrara reported on the solemn reception granted to the royal couple at Medina del Campo. At each stopover town, a quartermaster prepared apartments for the Queen, her ladies, and the great lords who were accompanying the convoy.

Saint-Sulpice continued to update Catherine on Élisabeth's progress, as well as Philip's demands concerning the absence of the Protestants from the meeting. He counselled her to stall on the matter and stressed the great value of the meeting. As her ambassador's report of Élisabeth's departure had not yet reached her, Catherine continued to fret that the meeting might be cancelled under false pretences in a letter of 15 April. In that letter, she gave assurances that the prince de Condé and queen of Navarre would absent themselves from the court until after the Bayonne meeting, but Catherine still hoped for convincing Philip to relent on the point.

Having reached Medina del Campo, the seigneur de Saint-Sulpice wrote to Élisabeth about the slow nature of her progress, highlighting the anxiety this was inducing in her Mother. From discussions with the Spanish ambassador in France, Álava, Catherine was suddenly informed that the presence of the prince de Condé was not in fact objectionable to Philip. Catherine wrote to Saint-Sulpice towards the end of April to see if he could make sense of the Spanish position. Thompson characterises this as a gambit from Catherine.

Álava was enjoying the attentions of the moment, and on 18 April noted that the other ambassadors had a degree of jealousy towards him. The Ambassador was enthusiastic about the prospect of an interview, as he greatly feared that without Spanish intervention, Catholicism in France would become extinct.

In Valladolid, the Spanish royal party was greeted with bull fights, jousts, and other festivities. Saint-Sulpice met with Philip and protested to him about the slow nature of Élisabeth's progress. He highlighted the problems this presented to the progress of the French court. Philip rejoindered that this was the first time Élisabeth was visiting many of these places, and she was thus obliged to tarry in each one for a few days. He reassured the French ambassador though, that after she had passed by Valladolid and Burgos, her journey would be more straightforward. Saint-Sulpice wrote on this conversation to the French court from Valladolid on 7 May. In this same correspondence, Saint-Sulpice explained that he had raised the matter of Condé with Philip, noting the recent voicing of approval from Álava. Philip expressed shock that his ambassador would have taken such a position. He affirmed his old position, the presence of Protestants at the interview was unacceptable. If Álava had said to the contrary, he was acting against instructions. If they were present, Élisabeth would turn around and come back to Spain, even if she were only a single league away from the city. He further noted that Condé had that year, been absent from the court for many months, and therefore there could surely be no trouble for him to absent himself for fifteen days.

Many Spanish grandees requested of Philip the right to accompany Élisabeth all the way to Bayonne. Philip would not grant this however, affording them only a rendezvous in Burgos for holy week.

That same day, Saint-Sulpice wrote to the prince de Condé himself, so that he might receive the news directly. He assured him of the efforts he had undertaken at Catherine's behest in defence of the Prince's honour. Despite these efforts however, he had been unable to overcome the Spanish opposition. He asserted that Condé would of course not take offence at this and would think first of all of the happiness of his king and the queen mother Catherine. A similar letter was sent to the admiral de Coligny.

=== Burgos ===
On 14 May, Élisabeth departed from Valladolid. While in the city, she and her husband had enjoyed watching bullfights with Philip's half-brother don John, in addition to the visiting of various monasteries. Philip had been unable to extract from the city's inhabitants any money for the costs of the progress. They hoped to arrive in Burgos on 20 May, where they could expect to receive 30,000 ducats, as well as an elaborate entry. Disaster struck however, when word arrived that the plague had broken out in Burgos. Thus, they would have to travel via Soria, a delay of a further four days. Saint-Sulpice assured Catherine that the plague was truly in Burgos, and that this was not a stalling tactic by the Spanish party.

On 15 May, Philip and Élisabeth separated with tears. Her retinue was now set for the trip onwards to Bayonne. The duke of Alba, the count of Benevente, the duke of Nájera, the duke of Osuna, a certain prior named don Hernando, the marquise of Cenete, the countess of Modica, Manrique de Lara, and various other nobles. Manrique de Lara complained to Philip in a letter of 18 May, that Élisabeth was acting as a spendthrift, and had already spent much of her budget for the trip on clothes and jewellery.

With the plague in Burgos, Élisabeth entered the city at dusk. Seven triumphal arches had been constructed for the occasion of receiving Élisabeth. One of them dedicated to her genealogy. She was greeted by the grandees of Burgos, and then the townsfolk. A parade transpired which involved two-hundred gentleman in black velvet with finely dressed ladies, and 1,500 soldiers. These soldiers then engaged in a mock battle in which they stormed a castle near the exit to the city.

The French court was plunged into a state of great anxiety at this time, due to a window of ten days in which no letter from Saint-Sulpice was received. Finally, on 25 May, the court received update that Élisabeth was still on route but had not made entry to Burgos due to the plague.

=== French progress ===
The French court was also undertaking its progress towards Bayonne. On 3 May, it departed from Bordeaux, arriving in Mont-de-Marsan on 8 May. Here, Catherine wrote to Élisabeth, opining that Condé would likely not come to Bayonne, but that it was difficult to assure her of this as he did not hold to a single policy for long. While the court was in Mont-de-Marsan, the seigneur de Rambouillet completed his mission, in which he had received assurances from Condé (who was then ill) that he would be absent from the Bayonne meeting. Similarly, the admiral de Coligny assured he would not depart from his residence. By 16 May, Saint-Sulpice was able to write to Élisabeth with assurance that Philip's demands for the meeting (i.e. the exclusion of Protestants) would be met.

Catherine informed the ambassadors that given the small amount of accommodation available in Bayonne, they would have to be lodged ten leagues (one league being around five kilometres) away. The Papal Nuncio Santacroce and Venetian ambassador were upset by this, little believing that it was a lack of housing that was responsible for their distancing. The English ambassador was likewise angry, though he also had other reasons for his frustration. Montmorency would confirm this for the ambassadors later in May. Champion affirms that Catherine was honest in the inability of Bayonne to accommodate the ambassadors, describing Bayonne as short of wheat, small, and afraid of plague.

Having arrived in Bayonne early, Álava was alarmed to observe the presence of the comte de Gramont, duc d'Uzès and the bishop of Valence. All of these men were considered by him to be Protestant 'heretics'. The ambassador believed that Philip had the right to give instructions on this matter. He knew that if the matter was raised with Catherine, she would respond that all went to Mass and that outside of madame d'Uzès and Marie Morlin (wife of the chancellor) all ladies of the court received communion. Nicoll opines that Uzès' presence reflected this grandees desire to present himself as a loyal Catholic, and separate from the Protestant party he had once been aligned with.

In a meeting of the royal council of 23 May 1565 which set the tone for Bayonne, Catherine declared that she was very much wedded to the edict of Amboise, and anyone who attempted to undermine it was a traitor.

In his letter of 4 June to Philip, Álava recorded a secret meeting of 20 days prior by which Monluc was invited to Catherine's chambers, where the Queen Mother promised him that a Catholic reconquest of the kingdom was coming, and they counted on his support. He was to kill any who defied the re-establishment of unitary Catholic worship. Álava was sceptical, imagining that the royal goal here was to drive Monluc and the seigneur de Damville against one another.

As Saint-Sulpice made his way north to Bayonne, he crossed paths with the seigneur de Lanssac on the road, the latter having been sent to meet Philip, so that he might thank the Spanish king for allowing the interview to go ahead. Having arrived in Bayonne, Saint-Sulpice met with Catherine. He discussed with her the strategy to take to defend the French religious policy against potential Spanish attacks. The Ambassador well understood this would be something the duke of Alba would raise. He advised her to justify herself on the grounds of defending the honour of god, safeguarding the French kingdom and ensuring the grandeur of the French monarchy. To tamper with the edicts was to risk the ruin of the kingdom.

=== Ottoman mission ===
Towards the end of May, the Ottoman ambassador (a Polish nobleman) named Haci Murad arrived at the French court. He had taken a meandering route to rendezvous with the French court. Though his arrival made a poor impression upon the Spanish, Haan argues it should not be overstated. The Ottoman ambassador was interested in gaining access to the French ports of Marseille and Toulon for the Ottoman fleet to winter. This would serve as a springboard for a spring campaign against the Spanish.

Catherine intended by the proximity of the Ottoman representative to indicate to Philip that were she so inclined, she might frustrate his control of the Mediterranean. Starting in May, the Ottomans undertook a siege against the island of Malta. This created a matter of diplomatic sensitivity for Catherine at Bayonne. Charles would meet with the Ottoman ambassador sometime around mid-June. Murad staying for two weeks and dining with the king on one occasion.

Catherine maintained hope that Philip would come to the meeting to the last moment, still imagining the possibility on 30 May. In June, after Charles' entry into Bayonne, Álava disabused her of this notion, informing her that Philip was indeed on his way, but to Madrid.

== Interview at Bayonne ==
=== Rendezvous with the queen ===
On 30 May, Catherine arrived in Bayonne in disguise, so that she might appraise herself of the progress of the preparations for Élisabeth's reception. She liaised with Álava, who had not been appraised of her arrival, to gauge when Élisabeth would arrive, and how her daughter was doing. She further requested that she have use of the house he had been staying in, so that she might employ it for a theatrical performance that evening. The governor of Bayonne, the vicomte d'Orthe, drew Catherine's attention to the dilapidated state of the house, but after liaising with the city council, the walls were reinforced with iron bars. The Spanish ambassador would be rehoused with the seigneur de Monluc.

==== Meeting with Álava ====
The next day, Catherine attended Mass in the Bayonne Cathedral. She received word from Álava that he desired to speak with her. She quickly received the Ambassador, who began with pleasantries about his new accommodation. Álava then confronted her forcefully, noting that he had heard some three days previous, that the Ottoman ambassador had met with Charles. He found this a sorry companion to the righteous and holy meeting that was about to take place. Catherine sent away her servants and then addressed Álava. She argued that this 'Turk' had arrived by ship in Provence not long ago, with the man desiring to speak with Charles. Tt was unknown if he was sent by the Ottoman Sultan or not. Further, she defended the right of France to receive ambassadors. She hoped this would not be the cause for the breaking off of the Bayonne conference. After a similar attack from Álava, Catherine again elaborated on the nature of the Ottoman ambassador's arrival. She noted they had no idea who sent him, and that she had dispatched the baron de La Garde to ascertain this. She could little understand why this was a cause for offence. Álava went on, arguing that it was impossible for Philip not to be offended by this, given the Ottomans were preparing to attack him, and this representative had come here seeking arms and munitions. Catherine assured him no such provisions would be made to the Ottomans. She also brought up that in the past, France and the Ottomans had been allies. Álava conceded this but pointed out that this was at a time when France and Spain were opposed to one another, and now they were allies. The Queen Mother reassured Álava. As she said, France only desired Spain as an ally, and would soon rid itself of this Ottoman representative, and the Ottoman alliance.

As Álava was writing up his account of this meeting, he was approached by the seigneur de Lanssac, who imparted the frustration that Catherine had felt about his conduct in this meeting. Lanssac noted that the Holy Roman Emperor had dealings with the Ottoman ambassador at Frankfurt. Álava responded that this case was different, but nevertheless, he had imparted all he had to say to Catherine.

==== Readying Bayonne ====
In preparation for the Interview, and as advised by Philip II, security had been increased in Bayonne. Both the garrison and guard of the château were supplemented, the parapets restored, artillery removed from storage and placed on the walls, and foreigners/beggars and others deemed to be undesirable deported from the city into quarantined areas outside Bayonne.

==== Charles' Entry ====
The French court at large continued its progress towards Bayonne. Having travelled down the Adour river in a flotilla, king Charles made his arrival at Bayonne on 3 June 1565. Disembarking, he positioned himself on a platform at the end of the bridge so that he might watch the bourgeois militia companies parade past. Then mounting his horse, he entered the city through the Saint-Esprit gate, which was adorned with garlands and verse inscriptions. He was greeted with salutes of artillery and found the streets decorated with tapestries and greenery. In the square, a battalion of the children of Bayonne, bearing swords, could be found. Crossing the pont Mayou, the king passed under another triumphal arch, before returning to his lodgings. Near the lodgings, portraits of Catherine and her children, beneath which verses could be found. These verses praised the strength of the branches that Catherine had brought forth by her fertility. According to Monluc's memoires, after entering the city he was received by Catherine and Charles, before whom he knelt. Catherine then informed him he would be left as absolute ruler of Guyenne after the court's departure, which would be for Paris, and that he could oversee the compulsion of all to attend Mass.

The Ottoman ambassador, one-hundred-and-fifty Ottomans with him, as well as light cavalry provided by the baron de La Garde, made his own approach to Bayonne. The ambassador was a Polish Christian. Lodgings were prepared for him four leagues out of the city. While staying in Toulouse, this Ottoman representative had been housed with the cardinal d'Armagnac. Álava understood the purpose of his visit to be the securing of Toulon and Marseille for the Ottoman navy to resupply and winter at.

On 10 June, Pentecost was celebrated in the city. For the occasion, Charles received those suffering from scrofula. Unfortunately, a large number of persons were present, and a crush followed in which around fifteen or sixteen were injured after the gates were opened.

==== Orléans meets Élisabeth ====
The duc d'Orléans was granted permission to enter Spain by Catherine, to rendezvous with his elder sister. Protocol meant that neither Catherine nor Charles could head into Spain for this. While Charles and Catherine waited for the Spanish to arrive, they undertook talks with the English ambassador about a match between Charles and the English queen Elizabeth I.

Orléans departed Bayonne on 9 June to effect this juncture, riding with one-hundred-and-twenty-five horsemen he made for Irun where he was greeted by a Spanish delegation of grandees (among whom Velada and Fernando de Toledo - the bastard son of the duke of Alba), but not Élisabeth herself. Orléans enjoyed a meeting with Fernando de Toledo. Both the Spanish and French parties then made for Hernani where Élisabeth was residing, arriving on 12 June. Orléans had brought with him a friend of Élisabeth's, the comtesse de Tende, Claire Strozzi for the meeting. Also with him were many great nobles of the French court: the dauphin d'Auvergne, the young duc de Guise, the duc de Longueville, and the constable de Montmorency's three younger sons (Méru, Thoré and Damville). The seigneur de Saint-Sulpice was also with the duc d'Orléans party.

It was reported that, very keen to meet with his sister, Orléans dismounted his horse some distance away, and had to be lifted by two companions so that he might kiss his sister, who remained on her horse per Spanish protocol. Édouard argues against this, noting that per protocol it would have been inappropriate to kiss the Queen that way, and that it is more plausible that she gave her brother kisses. His dismounting and approaching of the queen reflected the disparity of their ranks.

He was followed by the French seigneurs, who kissed Élisabeth's hand. The duc d'Orléans wrote to his brother, the king, that he had united with their sister Élisabeth, the two of them were having a good time together, and that she looked very much like the king. Élisabeth was very happy to see Claire, and the two spoke for much time. They lunched together, and then Orléans announced it was time to take to the road. Élisabeth demurred on grounds of tiredness, so they postponed their departure.

The party would rest at the palace of Juan de Idiáquez y Olazábal at San Sebastián for the night of 12 June, and then make back to Irun for the following night. Around this time the French royal party was just across the border at Saint-Jean-de-Luz, having departed Bayonne on 12 June. At Saint-Jean-de-Luz a galley was christened Caroline in Charles' honour. On 14 June, Élisabeth arrived at the Franco-Spanish border around Hendaye, she was in good spirits at the thought of meeting her mother and siblings.

That same day, Charles departed from Saint-Jean-de-Luz, making for Hendaye alongside Catherine and the princes. A feuillée (a display of greenery) was constructed on the banks of the river with many foods and drinks.

Élisabeth was greeted with a volley of musket fire by the maréchal de Strozzi. Catherine, the princesse de La Roche-sur-Yon, the cardinals de Guise and de Strozzi and the maréchal de Strozzi crossed the river Bidasoa to meet her. Charles remained in France on the far bank. Élisabeth fell to her knees before her Mother, who raised her up. A pontoon was then laid across the river so that she might greet her brother, Charles on the other bank. Alternatively, one chronicler records that Charles proceeded along the pontoon to the halfway point, placing himself exactly before the border of Spain without crossing it.

Arriving on the French side of the river, Élisabeth was first greeted by the constable de Montmorency, and then by her brother Charles. The king twice embraced his sister. With the heat oppressive, the party moved under a canopy to have a bite to eat, with the soldiers accompanying them firing several salvos. Charles gifted his sister a white palfrey (horse). Upon reaching Saint-Jean-de-Luz at nightfall, one-hundred members of the royal guard escorted them to their various quarters. Awaiting Élisabeth's arrival at the foot of the stairs was her sister Marguerite. Édouard believes Élisabeth would have seen herself in the young Marguerite and gave her a gift of a crimson dress.

The royal family quickly sat down to dine, with Élisabeth seated on Catherine's right, an honour that caused her to blush. Charles departed Saint-Jean-de-Luz to dine in Bayonne instead, so that he might prepare for Élisabeth's entry. The next day the journey to Bayonne resumed.

== Celebrations ==
In the hopes of illustrating the grandeur of the French court, Catherine surrounded herself with ostentatiously dressed ladies of the court. One of the outfits of these women was of gold cloth.

Jousts and comedies were paired to the negotiations with the duke of Alba that were undertaken at Bayonne by Catherine and Charles. These festivities had several purposes, on the one hand their grandeur illustrated the power of France, on the other their martial aspects illustrated the military prowess of the king and his brother.

=== Élisabeth's entry into Bayonne ===
For the entry of Élisabeth to Bayonne, which transpired on 15 June, the prince de Béarn (son of the queen of Navarre, and the future king Henri IV), who had been absent for the reception of Élisabeth (likely at the request of Philip II), enjoyed a position in the front row. This had been surrendered to him by his uncle, the cardinal de Bourbon. The cardinal de Bourbon had supposedly assured the Spanish ambassador that the prince de Béarn had committed to attend Mass on the condition he was not disinherited. Further the prince wished to come to Spain to kiss Philip's hand.

There would be dispute over precedence among the great nobility on the occasion of this entrance. In the evening, under torchlight, the queen made her entrance on a white horse with a brightly shining harness that the historian Chevallier values at 400,000 ducats, a gift to her from her husband Philip. As she approached, she was greeted with a salvo of gunfire. The governor of Bayonne then gave her a welcome, offering up both a speech and the keys to the city. Arches had been erected for the occasion, the first of which was dedicated to peace as embodied by Élisabeth. The queen herself was portrayed in the centre of the arch, with the god of war Mars at her feet and olive branches being held out towards her. Coming to the church, Élisabeth prayed publicly, before being led to the altar for a blessing by the cardinal de Strozzi. Élisabeth then passed through several more arches, including one which was dedicated to her mother on her way to the palace. The queen of Spain was put up in a wooden palace which had been constructed for the occasion. Through a gallery this wooden palace connected with the bishop's palace, in which Catherine and Charles were to be found.

=== Celebration and feasts ===
On 16 June, a ball of a Carthaginian theme took place in the great hall of this palace, with Charles and Élisabeth opening proceedings, followed by the duc d'Orléans and Marguerite, and then the rest of the court. On 17 June, more dancing, then a feast on 18 June. On Thursday 21 June, Corpus Christi day, a magic castle containing various prisoners was liberated as part of a mock siege, in an event witnessed by Charles and Catherine. Knights wishing to enter the castle had their intentions announced and were then charged by a knight from inside the castle. Having defeated the defending knight, the besieger entered the castle where they had to combat fire breathing devils. After this, the knight had to cross a moving wheel, and then best a giant with a club to access the bridge. The duc d'Orléans triumphed over the giant and freed some of the ladies from the castle. Ultimately triumph would go to the king, who reached the tower and broke the enchantment on it, thereby freeing the knights.

The masquerade of 21 June was the design of Jean-Antoine de Baïf, and in the historian Jouanna's estimation served as an illustrative reinforcement of hierarchy. The young prince de Béarn made his entrance immediately after the king and the duc d'Orléans, he was flanked by six ornately dressed retainers and the prince de Dombes. The Spanish duke of Medine de Rioseco is supposed to have remarked that he carried himself as were he an emperor.

Corpus Christi was celebrated with a procession and the induction of Charles IX into the Habsburg Order of the Golden Fleece, the duke of Alba having brought the necklace with him. This affair transpired in the afternoon in the great hall of the palace, with the duke of Alba flanked by the cardinal de Guise and duc de Guise. Alba gave a brief speech on the Golden Fleece and then bestowed it upon Charles. The party given that evening in celebration of Charles and his chivalric virtues continued until 01:00 in the morning.

On the afternoon of 22 June, a festivity was held by which the Spanish and French court made for the Île d'Aiguemeau on the river Adour. Attempting to embark the boat, Fernando de Toledo missed the plank and walked into the water to much laughter from the assembled including the royal family. On route, they passed by several constructed displays that evoked Neptune, Triton and sirens. Dolphins, whales and other creatures of the sea could also be witnessed. Upon reaching the island, Élisabeth was sung to by Neptune and Triton. In a similar incident to had befallen Fernando de Toledo, the duke of Benevente, attempting to disembark, slipped and fell into a muddy embankment. For both Benevente and Fernando de Toledo these humiliations would have consequences. On the island the assembled grandees ate at eight tables. Each table mixed members of the French and Spanish nobility. The top table was reserved for the royals and was under a canopy. Masquerades accompanied the meal, and the affair concluded around 23:00.

An elaborate banquet was enjoyed on 23 June at which all were dressed as shepherds, and groups representing the various provinces of France played a role with their local dances and instruments. Those of Poitou played the bagpipes, the women of Provence twirled to cymbals, the women of Burgundy and Champagne played oboes and drums, and the Breton women danced. After the meal, a troop of 'satyr' musicians was to dance with a group of 'nymphs'. The evening was cut short by a storm, which proved the source of much laughter and confusion, and it would not be until 02:00 that the assembled were in their beds.

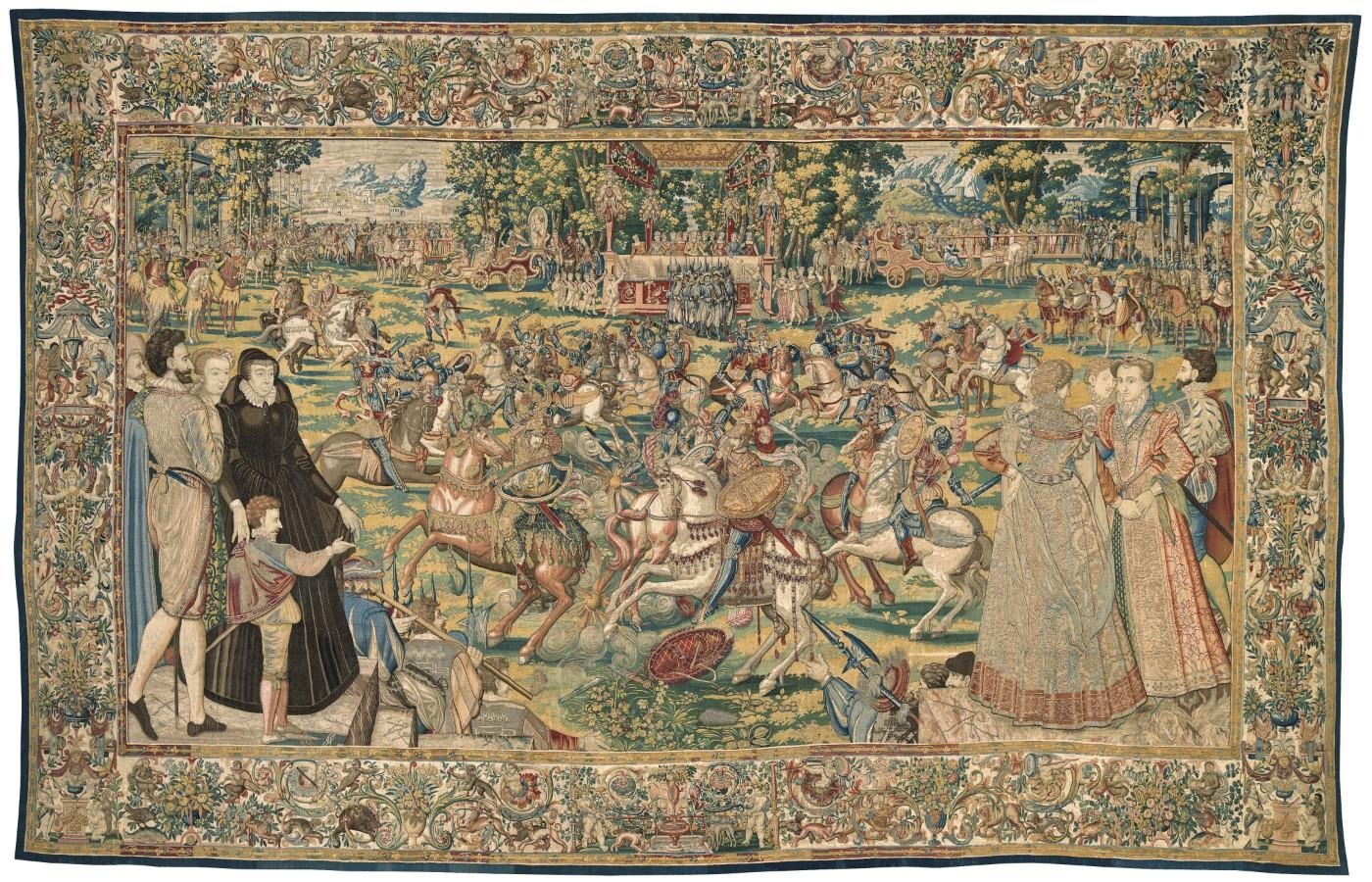
Carrousel des chevaliers bretons et irlandais à Bayonne, also known as Tournament

On 25 June, a new combat saw a Breton and an Irishman argue on the relative merits of 'love' and 'virtue'. For the tournament that followed the opposing sides would be represented by Charles (for virtue) and the duc d'Orléans (for love). The fighting had the markers of a masquerade, featuring various characters from mythology. Love and virtue were in chariots, from one of which flowed water, and the other of which spat fire. Charles himself was to be found in chariot drawn by four white palfreys, and upon which could be found the goddess Venus. The chariot of love passed by Élisabeth and Catherine, distributing gifts to them. Combat then followed between the teams of knights. After three hours of sword combat, love and virtue were reconciled to much enthusiasm. Their reconciliation was celebrated with the firing of an artillery salvo.

A dispute over precedence among the high nobility again emerged during the Running at the ring.

The various festivities featured both Protestant and Catholic members of the French nobility, in the hopes that this might illustrate the unity of the kingdom of France. In the combats, various costumes were adopted by the nobles, including Spanish, Moorish, and Egyptian.

Alba and Élisabeth little allowed themselves to be distracted from their purpose by this extravagant opulence. They wanted a commitment from Catherine to deal with the religious question.

== Diplomacy ==
While the court was in Bayonne, Charles received the Ottoman ambassadors' request for access to a Provençal seaport, in the eventuality their conquest of Malta proved a failure.

=== Alba's reception ===
The duke of Alba gave compliments to the cardinal de Bourbon and the constable de Montmorency as he had been charged. He assured the duc de Montpensier of the affection that bound the Bourbon-Montpensier to the Spanish royal house. According to the historian Champion, Montpensier responded to this by throwing himself into the Ambassador's arms and bemoaning that Philip was France's only hope. Meeting the seigneur de Monluc, the duke of Alba is to have played on his vanity, informing the lieutenant-general that the conference at large was his doing. He further asserted that Philip had asked him to pick Monluc's mind on the path forward for religion in France. Won over by this, Monluc expounded on his views openly.

Meeting with Charles, Alba initially broached inconsequential matters, before turning to the possibility of the state of the French kingdom, and the possibility of war. Charles dismissed this as a possibility, describing himself as a lover of peace. In addition to war, Alba also spoke of hunting with Charles.

Moving on from Charles, Alba approached the prince de La Roche-sur-Yon and praised the governor for the obedience in which he kept his government (Dauphiné). La Roche-sur-Yon credited his gentle touch. Álava was able to affirm for Alba the fear felt by the Protestants concerning the meeting, as they believed it to be a prelude to their destruction.

The Spanish duke was overflowing in praise for the young prince d'Orléans, telling the seigneur de Saint-Sulpice that the king's brother was one of the most accomplished princes of his age.

=== Negotiations with Alba ===
In the negotiations themselves, which transpired from 21 to 30 June, Alba looked to see Catherine abandon her policy of toleration towards Protestantism, and join in persecution, hand in hand with the Spanish crowns policy to that effect. Alba had received instructions from Philip to push against French plans for a new colonial effort to be made to Florida, the ships of which were due to depart from Dieppe. To his anti-Protestant goal, Catherine was to give Protestant ministers a month to depart the kingdom (on pain of death if they returned), eliminate toleration of the Protestant faith in France, and remove all Protestant office holders from their charges.

To the frustration of the Spanish party, the Spanish ambassador Álava was at this time unwell. It would not only be religious toleration that was discussed but also French policy towards the Ottomans. Catherine opened with an offensive of her own. She complained to her daughter about Philip and then moved on to addressing several grievances to Alba alone. A matter concerning the Flemish enclave of Lumes, the Spanish diplomatic interference in Switzerland, and the controversy of relative precedence between France and Spain in the Papal court.

Alba queried whether Catherine imagined the situation in France had improved or deteriorated since the signing of the edict of Amboise. The Queen Mother assured him that it had improved and was continuing to do so daily. Alba disagreed and tried to illustrate for her the decline in affairs. He was interrupted by Catherine who asked again whether he was proposing a return to civil war. Alba argued that at the moment this was not necessary.

Catherine defended herself against the charge that she was an ally to the 'infidel', arguing that the French were working to distance themselves from the Ottomans. She noted though that it was the duty of a sovereign to receive ambassadors. Alba begrudgingly accepted this argument. By the time of the Bayonne meeting, the ships of Dieppe had already departed, and the next ships were not going to be ready October. As a result, Alba held off from bringing up this matter, stalling for a more advantageous time. The Spanish duke also pushed for the murder of the admiral de Coligny. The queen mother inquired of Alba how she was meant to implement such a policy, to which Alba rejoindered that she would know this better than he.

In his arguments, the Spanish grandee was careful to avoid threatening behaviour, relying instead on appeals to the pride of the French monarchy, presenting the spectre of a Spanish king compelled to fight heresy alone due to the weakness of the French crown.

Charles dismissed the idea of making war on the French Protestants with Alba, stating he little desired to see his kingdom fall into ruin. Catherine argued contrary to Alba that the edict of Amboise itself succeeded in halting Protestantism. Neither side cared to listen to the view of the other. Through the talks, Catherine did her best to avoid answering Alba's embarrassing questions, and the Spanish duke obtained no firm commitments.

Already by the end of 21 June, Alba and Juan Manrique de Lara were despondent on the prospect of achieving their goals from the conference and wrote to Philip to this effect.

The Queen Mother proposed that France, the pope, the Spanish and the Holy Roman Empire join in a league against the Ottomans. Sutherland argues that this proposal was insincere. The rupture of French relations with the Ottomans would involve a quid pro quo by which the Spanish ties to the English were similarly voided. With the council of Trent a failure, Catherine saw an alliance of all the Catholic sovereigns in Europe, as liable to inspire the necessary fear to cause Protestantism to go into retreat.

Catherine was more hopeful of negotiating marital projects: in particular that of the Spanish prince don Carlos with her daughter Marguerite; and the duc d'Orléans with Philip II's sister Joanna. The delicate health of don Carlos, and his possible infertility seemed to make the former match more realistic. She hoped to see Orléans afforded the territory of Milan or Tuscany by such a marriage. Tuscany was not a Spanish territory, but the current duke of Florence could be dispossessed of the land for the marriage due to his dealings with the Ottomans.

Were such proposals to move forward, Catherine could work on the religious troubles of the kingdom more favourably. Alba did not even discuss these marriage proposals with Catherine. When she spoke of the proposals with her daughter Élisabeth, the queen of Spain shot down the notion of Marguerite marrying don Carlos, and suggested that a marriage between Orléans and Joanna would not involve any territorial dowry. Philip would not consent to the sacrifice of a state. Élisabeth also noted that surely her own marriage to Philip was sufficient for maintaining the good relations between the two countries. The historian Haan observes, that Élisabeth had personal reasons to object to the Carlos-Marguerite match, as it would have moved her to the margins concerning the Franco-Spanish relationship.

=== Élisabeth joins the fray ===
Élisabeth told Charles that if the Protestants were not dealt with, the French kings could never experience the authority his forebears had enjoyed. Catherine remained elusive, promising only to gather a council to examine the Tridentine proposals, particularly those that effected the prerogatives of the French crown and church. On this point, she had argued that France and Spain were very different kingdoms, and it was necessary to clarify the points the council of Trent had overlooked. Further, defending the idea against the attacks of Alba, Catherine, while admitting the risks of such a council, noted that the failures of the first French religious council (that of Poissy) could be laid at the door of the cardinal de Lorraine. Her son was strong enough to keep such a council on track if it were called now. Alba was frustrated by this, imagining the product of such a council to be the expansion of religious liberty in France. As for 'punishing the rebels [Protestants]', for Catherine that was out of the question, to do so would restart the civil war.

On the matter of the chancellor, L'Hôpital, the duke of Alba excoriated him before Catherine. He noted that with him in office, Catherine could little provide justice in the kingdom. Catherine defended L'Hôpital, which caused Alba to derisively remark that she could surely see he was a Protestant. Catherine denied this was the case, leading to Alba to opine that she was the only one in the kingdom who could not see his religion. Élisabeth joined in on the attack, arguing that L'Hôpital's supposed Protestantism had been clear even during the reign of her father Henri II. She argued that as long as he was chancellor, Catholics would be oppressed and Protestantism championed. Élisabeth proposed that were he dismissed from court for a while, Catherine would see the veracity of the Spanish position.

Catherine would say of her daughter during the Bayonne interview that she had become 'very Spanish', to which Élisabeth rejoindered that she had indeed, as her 'duty and reason' required. She assured Catherine that nevertheless, she was just as much her daughter as when she had departed for Spain in 1559. Catherine would a little while later note that her daughter should 'keep in mind the place and blood she descended from'.

=== Grand council and the 'religious remedy' ===
On 30 June, Charles presided over a grand council. Present for the occasion were Catherine, Élisabeth, the duc d'Orléans, the duke of Alba, the constable de Montmorency, the duc de Montpensier, the cardinals de Bourbon and de Guise, the maréchal de Bourdillon, and don Juan Manrique de Lara. The constable de Montmorency explained and justified the current religious policy of toleration, raising the spectre of civil war were it to be abandoned. He made a further point concerning ill-intentioned individuals who had called Catherine and Charles Protestants. He noted repression was the best way to deal with Protestants. At the same time, a civil war at this moment would be dangerous. Montmorency also observed that, if the Protestants did cause trouble, the king would know how to deal with them. He then raised the possibility of the convening of a small council to consider the application of the Tridentine decrees, and their compatibility with the Gallican (autonomous French) church and French royal prerogatives.

Catherine promised her daughter that she would 'remedy' religious matters once the royal tour was complete. Philip would interpret this agreement as being with the proposed policy Alba had advocated for, noting that it was a satisfactory thing for his wife to hear. These theoretical concessions to the Spanish religious position were to be in exchange for Spanish consideration of the royal marriage proposals Catherine had made, the voiding of the Spanish alliance with England, the stability of the French domestic situation, and a territorial dowry for the duc d'Orléans. Haan further describes the proposal as 'opportunistic' and designed to buy time for Catherine, free of Spanish, and French Catholic pressure against the French religious policy. He observes that she succeeded in gaining around six months from this.

What Catherine meant by 'remedy' was ambiguous. The Venetian ambassador, Suriano, interpreted it as simply an agreement to receive the Tridentine decrees. Suriano noted that at the point of the meeting breaking up, Catherine had summoned the Papal Nuncio to join with them in Bayonne, and that he had found the workable solution to forge an agreement between Catherine and Alba. He stated that the Nuncio consented to the possibility of a council to discuss the Tridentine decrees, but that it should not contain any Protestants, and that doctrine and dogma would not be discussed (only the reform of church abuses). This was agreeable to Catherine, who asked the Nuncio to communicate her approval to Alba. All together came to meet the next day, alongside the maréchal de Bourdillon, the cardinal de Bourbon and Élisabeth the next day and affirmed the decision. The historian Pernot argues her religious policy remained entirely unchanged by the meeting. Haan sees her as having conditionally (against a large set of concessions) agreed to reintroduce some form of repression against French Protestants. Jouanna argues she promised nothing. Édouard argues that Catherine rejected any possibility of violent action against the Protestants. The historian Chevallier finds no evidence Catherine agreed to either a plan of extermination, or even a plan to restrict toleration more harshly. The historian Solnon argues that Catherine agreed to nothing during the meeting. Sournia dismisses the Bayonne conference as accomplishing nothing.

== End of the talks ==
=== Taking leave of one another ===
The talks concluded on 2 July. The Spanish made their departure from Bayonne, little believing what Catherine had promised them. Ribera argues that the interview demonstrated the fairly illusory nature of the Franco-Spanish friendship. The proclamations of peace and friendship lacking a deep sincerity.

Before making his departure from Bayonne, Charles visited Boucau so that he might review the plans for a new port.

The Spanish parted ways with the French at Saint-Jean-de-Luz, with Charles tearfully separating from his elder sister here. Montmorency chastised the king, noting that a monarch must not cry, lest it be seen by foreigners, or his subjects. Catherine accompanied her daughter further, to Irun, and the duc d'Orléans further still, going fifteen leagues into Spain to Segura before leaving Élisabeth to link back up with the French court. Orléans returned to Saint-Jean-de-Luz where Charles was distracting himself from the sadness of Élisabeth's departure with whale hunting and dancing. He watched young girls dancing in the Basque style with tambourines and bells. At Saint-Jean-de-Luz, the constable de Montmorency got into a dispute over accommodation with the duc de Montpensier that resulted in the collapse of relations between the two men.

Summoning the Spanish ambassador, Catherine inquired of him whether he was satisfied by the conclusion of the meeting. She supposedly assured him she would bring to pass the agreement she had made with Élisabeth, but that secrecy must be maintained. Álava was however concerned that the Protestants remained at the French court and could cause Catherine to reconsider her resolution.

As Élisabeth made her progress back into Spain, Saint-Sulpice continued to keep Catherine appraised of her movements. Élisabeth restricted her travel to the evenings, due to the excessive heat during the day. Saint-Sulpice informed Catherine that the Bayonne conference had been appreciated by the Spanish for the opportunity it had offered to strengthen ties between the two states. On 30 July, Élisabeth and Philip were reunited, around ten leagues off from Segovia, Philip having come north to welcome her. A day later, Élisabeth indicated to Saint-Sulpice that she had raised the marriage proposals Catherine had proposed during the Bayonne conference with Philip, as well as the Catholic League, but that Philip had doubts on both counts.

=== Marriage alliance ===
On the matter of the marriage alliance proposals, in August Saint-Sulpice would find the prince of Éboli favourable to a match between Marguerite and don Carlos. The Spanish grandee believed it would well serve the continuation of peaceable relations. Come September, Philip rejected the proposal through the duke of Alba. That month, he also wrote a letter for his wife to send rejecting the marriage proposals. He noted that the don Carlos match was quite impossible as the prince was to be wed to the daughter of the Holy Roman Emperor, Anna. A match between Joanna and the duc d'Orléans was also off the cards. He took the same approach as had his wife during the Bayonne Interview negotiations, new marriages would accomplish nothing not already accomplished by his marriage to Élisabeth. Nevertheless, Catherine kept at her marriage proposals, continuing to broach them in correspondence with Philip. The impossibility of a Joanna/duc d'Orléans match was reiterated by Philip in a letter to Catherine in December 1565.

=== Catholic League ===
As for the alliance of Catholic princes, in Philip's opinion this could precipitate a civil war in the Holy Roman Empire with the Protestant princes. Catherine clarified that her ambition was to unite Christendom, but also that a league could not go ahead until the marriage proposals had progressed.

In a more definitive response to the Bayonne proposals, made in December, Philip stated (again through Alba) that both marriage proposals would not progress, and that fighting the 'infidel' was a Christian duty, not something to be horse traded over for concessions from Spain. If the French would not break with the Ottomans, that was fine by the Spanish, who could deal with the threat without a pan-Christian league.

The French were left embittered in the wake of Bayonne. Philip had not deigned to come to Bayonne himself and had shown a complete lack of interest in the French proposals that had emerged from it. Indeed, Haan describes the Spanish attitude as cold if not openly hostile to the proposals.

=== End of Saint-Sulpice's tenure ===
On 9 September, Saint-Sulpice was able to report Philip's gratitude for the good reception given to Élisabeth by the French at the Bayonne conference.

In a conversation between the duke of Alba and the seigneur de Saint-Sulpice, the former defended himself against the charge that he had come to Bayonne with the purpose of fomenting a war against French Protestantism. He denied this and noted that had he come to France with that position, Philip would have disassociated himself from his ambassador. Saint-Sulpice noted some indeed held this view of his visit, and it was with difficult that Saint-Sulpice worked to disillusion them.

Though the meeting had hardly been a success, its very organisation was considered a great credit to the French ambassador, the seigneur de Saint-Sulpice. His replacement in Spain, the baron de Fourquevaux wrote to Charles in glowing terms about the skills of his predecessor in October 1565.

=== Spanish legacy ===
The Spanish delegation was greatly pleased by the behaviour of Élisabeth during the conference. She had stuck well to the party line, and this was reported on to Philip. The Spanish king therefore wrote with pleasure to the cardinal of Pachecho on Élisabeth's efforts to see her Mother adopt the Tridentine decrees in the French kingdom. The baron de Fourquevaux (the new French ambassador to Spain) observed something quite different in Élisabeth's attitude in the wake of the interview at Bayonne. He felt that the Queen had successfully been reminded of the bonds of blood she held with the French royal family, and that she now looked to almost play the role of a spy, informing Charles of developments in Spain that might be contrary to his interests. Further that she began to intervene with her husband while assuming the French position.

Writing to Philip on 21 June, Alba noted that he had enjoyed success in forging connections with various French Catholic potentates during the meeting: the duc de Montpensier, the cardinal de Bourbon, the comte d'Escars, a certain d'Avilla, the abbot of Saint-Pierre, the maréchal de Bourdillon and several others. Alba's overall assessments of the talks was pessimistic, Catherine's mind would soon be changed by the return of the 'heretics' to court.

Álava wrote to an Eraso on 4 July explaining that Alba would communicate to him, and Philip the resolutions reached at Bayonne. Álava saw the possibility of them coming to pass as a great boon for Philip and god. However, he fretted that enacting them would put Catherine in considerable danger.

Writing to a certain del Canton on 20 August, the cardinal Granvelle (governor of the Spanish Netherlands) noted that Catherine had promised them wonderful things at Bayonne, on the understanding they did not trigger a new civil war. He was of the opinion that she was so wedded to her current policy of balancing the factions that she would remain with it. Her promises were therefore meaningless. He noted his opinion that this would lead Catholicism into ruin, as well as the authority of Charles.

In Philip's account of the Bayonne meeting, intended for Papal ears (his letter of 24 August to cardinal Pacheco), he explained that the meeting had concerned remedies for the religious troubles in France and the implementation of the Tridentine decrees.

Álava convinced himself of a turn in a repressive direction of French policy in the wake of Bayonne, opining on 30 November 1565 that soon Catherine would ban Protestantism and expel all the Protestant ministers from the kingdom. In this new frame of mind, he even ceased to attack the policy of French religious tolerance for a certain time. As time wore on, Álava became disillusioned. The French tour of the kingdom finished, yet this did not seem to herald the destruction of the regime of religious tolerance. Catherine maintained her adherence to the edict of Amboise. Philip, who had initially felt that he had won over Catherine to his way of thinking through the interview at Bayonne, felt as though he had been duped by Catherine's fine words at Bayonne. She was in fact a dissimulator in the mould of Louis XI.

=== Domestic Catholic opinion ===
Champion writes that both Protestants and Catholics felt the expense of the Bayonne Interview to be wasteful.

L'Hôpital and the prince de La Roche-sur-Yon were left dispirited by the talks. Similarly disappointed was the seigneur de Damville, who argued that Catherine had not kept her word to him, and that he desired to resign from all his offices and go abroad to fight against the 'infidels'.

The seigneur de Damville, meeting secretly with the Spanish ambassador Álava, spoke about how at Bayonne Charles and Catherine had secretly promised to establish him as a maréchal of France. Further, the kingdom at large would be divided between the four maréchaux (Marshal of France - most senior military command in ancien régime France, subordinate only to the Constable of France) into super-military governates, with he to receive Guyenne and Languedoc. Summarising his impression of the conclusions of the meeting, he stated that a league had been established by which France would be separated from the Ottoman Empire. Further he outlined a coming 'purge' of the kingdom. A form of Damville's first statement would come to pass, he would be elevated to the Marshalate in February 1566 and then would receive an extraordinary lieutenant-generalcy over Languedoc, Guyenne, Provence and Dauphiné in 1569.

Catherine, in a letter to the maréchal de Montmorency, reported that the meeting had only broached light matters, such as the maintenance of good relations between the two kingdoms, peace in the kingdom, the enjoyment of good food, and other pleasantries. The maréchal received similar reports from the secretary of state L'Aubespine (one of the three secretaries of state present alongside the seigneur de Villeines and seigneur de Fresne for Bayonne) in a letter of 1 July, noting that nothing of substance had been agreed. L'Aubespine had previously written the maréchal de Montmorency on 16 June to offer an optimistic assessment of the interviews progress.

=== Protestant distrust ===
The contemporary Protestant historian, La Popelinière was highly critical of the Bayonne enterprise. He saw in it needless excess in its expenditure, as well as an insincere papering over of the cracks of civil war with a façade of unity. He compared the strength of the Valois unfavourably with the Spanish crown.

The Protestants interpreted the Bayonne conference dimly, as the origin point of a plot to jointly exterminate both them and their Dutch compatriots. The exclusion of the prince de Condé and queen of Navarre from attendance of the interview was counterproductive in this regard.

This fearful panicking was not limited to French Protestants but also those abroad in England and the Holy Roman Empire. The English statesman, William Cecil imagined the nucleus of a Catholic crusade against the Protestant faith had been germinated at Bayonne. The shadowy hand of an international Catholic conspiracy extended from the Spanish crown, to Pope Pius IV, to the queen of Scots and even the Catholics of the kingdom of England. It was indeed true that the duc de Montpensier's confessor had proposed to the duke of Alba that Condé, Coligny, d'Andelot, and La Rochefoucauld's heads all be cut off. Champion adds the comte de Gramont to this list, and suggests that Álava had asked for the proposal in writing from Montpensier. This was in accordance with Alba's own ambitions, for the five or six principal Protestant leaders to be decapitated. It was further alleged that the maréchal de Bourdillon had confided in Álava that the situation in the kingdom was worsening continually, and that if they did not move fast the Catholic faith and Charles' crown would be lost. As such, Catherine's plan to maintain the edict of Amboise until the king's majority was not suitable. Therefore, the 'Catholics had decided', with the positive attitude of the Spanish king, to act now.

The historian Crété finds Catherine to be responsible for the civil war that followed Bayonne in 1567, due to her continual 'deceit' meaning the Protestants could not trust her assurances about the conference.

=== Diplomatic reassurance ===
Reports of the meeting were sent out by the court to the Italian states of Venice and Florence, to the Holy Roman Emperor, and to the Protestant princes of the Empire. In the hopes of reassuring Protestant opinion (domestic and foreign), it was stressed by the French that no assaults on the rights granted by the edict of Amboise had been made during the meeting. Guy de Saint-Gelais was sent to the German Protestants to emphasise this point, though Álava reported on a more elaborate purpose for the mission. To his Venetian ambassador, Charles wrote that the meeting had consisted entirely of pleasures and 'caresses', with the aim of continuing the good friendship between the two kingdoms. The significance of the meeting itself was downplayed by both the French and the Spanish. The Spanish took a slightly different tack to the French, with Philip not even bothering to describe the meeting as one that had affirmed Franco-Spanish friendship. Certainly, no serious negotiations had taken place at it. The French reception of the Ottoman representative around the time of the interview enabled this approach, and his ambassador to the Holy Roman Empire, the seigneur de Chantonnay stressed that under such circumstances, a rapprochement between Philip and Charles was impossible.

Hoping to sooth the Protestant anxieties in the wake of Bayonne, Catherine wrote to the queen of Navarre. She invited Jeanne to rejoin with the court, looked to bond with her over complaints about royal officials, and noted that the court would stop in Nérac.

=== Long term regrets ===
In the Autumn of 1566, the prince of Éboli opined to Philip that had he been sent to the Bayonne meeting instead of the duke of Alba, the Christian world might be at peace. The prince of Éboli was also of the opinion that, because Saint-Sulpice had advised Catherine to hold her cards so close to her chest at the Bayonne meeting, the duke of Alba had decided against encouraging Philip to come north and join his wife at Bayonne. Instead, Alba had informed Philip that coming to Bayonne would be pointless. Éboli thought this a great pity, as Philip would have handled the meeting better.

== Sources ==
- Babelon, Jean-Pierre (2009). Henri IV. Fayard.
- Boltanski, Ariane (2006). Les ducs de Nevers et l'État royal: genèse d'un compromis (ca 1550 - ca 1600). Librairie Droz.
- Brunet, Serge (2017). «De l'Espagnol dedans le Ventre!»: Les Catholiques du Sud-Ouest de La France face à La Réforme (vers 1540–1589) Tome 1. Honoré Champion.
- Brunet, Serge (2023). "Jeanne d'Albret, Pierre d'Albret, Évêque de Comminges, et la «Trahison» de Blaise de Monluc. Aux Origines de la Ligue dans le Sud-Ouest de la France". In Berriot-Salvadore, Evelyne; Chareyre, Philippe; Martin-Ulrich, Claudie (eds.). Jeanne d'Albret et sa Cour.
- Champion, Pierre (1937). Catherine de Médicis présente à Charles IX son Royaume (1564-1566). Grasset.
- Champion, Pierre (1941). La Jeunesse de Henri III (1551 – 1571). Grasset.
- Chevallier, Pierre (1985). Henri III: Roi Shakespearien. Fayard.
- Cloulas, Ivan (1979). Catherine de Médicis. Fayard.
- Constant, Jean-Marie (1984). Les Guise. Hachette.
- Crété, Liliane (1985). Coligny. Fayard.
- Daussy, Hugues (2015). Le Parti Huguenot: Chronique d'une Désillusion (1557-1572). Droz.
- Daussy, Hugues (2023). "La Strategie Européenne du Parti Huguenot". In Le Roux, Nicolas (ed.). Les Guerres de Religion: Une Histoire de l'Europe au XVIe Siècle. Passés Composés.
- Decrue, Francis (1889). Anne, Duc de Montmorency: Connétable et Pair de France sous les Rois Henri II, François II et Charles IX. E. Plon, Nourrit et Cie.
- Édouard, Sylvène (2009). Le Corps d'une Reine: Histoire Singulière d'Élisabeth de Valois (1546-1568). Presses Universitaires de Rennes.
- François, Michel (1959). Lettres de Henri III, Roi de France: Tome I (1557 - Août 1574). Société de l'Histoire de France.
- Gellard, Matthieu (2014). Une Reine Épistolaire: Lettres et Pouvoir au Temps de Catherine de Médicis. Classiques Garnier.
- Haan, Bertrand (2011). L'Amitié Entre Princes: Une Alliance Franco-Espagnole au Temps des Guerres de Religion (1560-1570). Presses Universitaires de France.
- Jouanna, Arlette (1989). Le Devoir de révolte: La noblesse française et la gestation de l'Etat moderne 1559-1661. Fayard.
- Jouanna, Arlette (1998). "Le Temps des Guerres de Religion en France (1559-1598)". In Jouanna, Arlette; Boucher, Jacqueline; Biloghi, Dominique; Le Thiec, Guy (eds.). Histoire et Dictionnaire des Guerres de Religion.
- Jouanna, Arlette (2021). La France du XVIe Siècle 1483-1598. Presses Universitaires de France.
- Knecht, Robert (1996). The Rise and Fall of Renaissance France. Fontana Press.
- Knecht, Robert (2008). The French Renaissance Court. Yale University Press.
- Labourdette, Jean François (2013). Charles IX et la Puissance Espagnole: Diplomatie et Guerres Civiles (1563–1574). Honoré Champion.
- Le Roux, Nicolas (2022). 1559-1629 Les Guerres de Religion. Gallimard.
- Lhoumeau, Charles Sauzé de (1940). Un Fils Naturel de François Ier: Louis de Saint-Gelais, baron de la Mothe-Saint-Héray. Société Française d'Imprimerie et de Librairie.
- Marchand, Romain (2020). Henri de La Tour (1555 – 1623): Affirmation Politique, Service du Roi et Révolte. Classiques Garnier.
- Mariéjol, Jean H. (1983). La Réforme, la Ligue, l'Édit de Nantes. Tallandier.
- Michalewicz, Nathan (2020). Franco-Ottoman Diplomacy during the French Wars of Religion 1559-1610. George Mason University.
- Nicoll, David (2020). Noble Identity during the French Wars of Religion: Antoine de Crussol, the duc d'Uzès. University of Warwick.
- Pernot, Michel (1987). Les Guerres de Religion en France 1559-1598. Sedes.
- Pernot, Michel (2013). Henri III: Le Roi Décrié. Éditions de Fallois.
- Pitts, Vincent (2012). Henri IV of France: His Reign and Age. Johns Hopkins University Press.
- Potter, David (1997). The French Wars of Religion: Selected Documents. Palgrave Macmillan.
- Ribera, Jean-Michel (2018). Diplomatie et Espionnage: Les Ambassadeurs du Roi de France auprès de Philippe II - Du Traité du Cateau-Cambrésis (1559) à la mort de Henri III (1589). Classiques Garnier.
- Roelker, Nancy Lyman (1968). Queen of Navarre: Jeanne d'Albret 1528-1572. Harvard University Press.
- Solnon, Jean-François (2001). Henri III: un désir de majesté. Librarie Académique Perrin.
- Sournia, Jean-Charles (1981). Blaise de Monluc: Soldat et Écrivain (1500-1577). Fayard.
- Sutherland, Nicola (1962). The French Secretaries of State in the Age of Catherine de Medici. The Athlone Press.
- Sutherland, Nicola (1973). The Massacre of St Bartholomew and the European Conflict 1559-1572. Macmillan.
- Thompson, James (1909). The Wars of Religion in France 1559-1576: The Huguenots, Catherine de Medici and Philip II. Chicago University Press.
- Viallon, Marina (2023). "Politique Chevaleresque: Joutes et Tournois à la Cour Pendant les Guerres de Religion". Les Guerres de Religion 1559-1610: La Haine des Clans. In Fine Éditions d'art.
