= André d'Albaigne =

Francisque and André d’Albaigne were 16th-century Italian merchants from the city of Lucca. Their name was Dalbagnio, according to a notary act of 1567 involving their brother Pellegrino (resident at La Rochelle, France since his marriage to the daughter of Mayor Vincent Nicolas).

== d'Albaigne proposal to colonize Terra Australis ==
=== Francisque d’Albaigne ===
From Lisbon (where he was an agent of the Bonvisi merchant house), Francisque d’Albaigne went to Paris to propose the occupation of a “certain very rich new land of very great extent not yet discovered by the kings of Spain and Portugal”. He had lured cosmographer Bartolomeu Velho from the service of the Portuguese to “demonstrate” to King Charles IX the location of this unknown country. However, Velho died at Nantes on 28 February 1568 and Francisque soon after.

=== André d'Albaigne's proposal in France ===
André d’Albaigne took up the proposal of his brother. He claimed to possess “the secrets, charts and necessary instruments for conquering and reducing to the obedience of His Majesty great extent of lands and realms abundant and rich in gold, silver, precious stones, drugs and spiceries”. Warmly remembering how France regretted dismissing Christopher Columbus, he promised the discovery of a new part of the world a seven-months' voyage away, with “realms abundant and rich in gold, silver, precious stones, drugs and spiceries”.

Although the geographical destination of this enterprise was not plainly stated anywhere in the correspondence a modern authority, E.-T. Hamy, has suggested that the real purpose (concealed in vague and cryptic language) was to explore and colonize the unknown continent of Terra Australis. As Kenneth Andrews has commented, this thesis cannot be proved and has failed to convince some other authorities. It should be taken seriously, however, in light of references to Francisque’s project in the dispatches of French ambassador to London Michel de Castelnau de la Mauvissière during the period 1577-1580 when he reported on the voyages of John Frobisher, Humphrey Gilbert and Francis Drake. Reporting upon the return of Drake in November 1580, the ambassador mentioned Francisque d’Albaigne in connection with Drake’s alleged sighting (after he passed the Cape of Good Hope) of “une des terres australles et meridionalle qui ne sont descouvertes” (“one of the austral and southern lands which have not been discovered”), the same lands d’Albaigne had proposed for conquest.

It is impossible to determine the real objective of the d’Albaigne project. Velho’s 1561 chart of the New World is remarkable for its authoritative treatment of Brazil, La Plata, and Peru. It shows Potosí in modern Bolivia and “Valdepariso” (Valparaíso in Chile. South of the Strait of Magellan, Tierra del Fuego appears in conventional form as an ambiguous tip of a potential continental mass otherwise not delineated. Velho was evidently more interested in South America than in Terra Australis, but such map evidence carries very little weight. The world map in the Cosmography compiled by Velho in 1568 for King Charles IX at the request of Francisque d’Albaigne is noteworthy for having no representation of Australia, which would appear to confirm that he had no interest in Terra Australis.

André d’Albaigne had probably inherited from Velho some certainties regarding this hypothetical continent. Lancelot Voisin de La Popelinière (who was inspired by André d'Albaigne's memoir) specified in 1582 that he was concerned with “a land stretching from the South, or Midi, to thirty degrees from the Equator, of much greater extent than all of America, only discovered by Magellan when he passed through the strait between this Austral land and the southern quarter of America to go to the Moluccas”.

Michel de Castelnau first mentions “d’Albaigne” in October 1577, when reporting Frobisher’s alleged discovery of gold mines. He thought these vast gold-bearing lands “vers le Nort” (“toward the North”) must be those d’Albaigne had offered to acquire for King Charles years before. In July 1578 he reported that Humphrey Gilbert had the Queen’s permission to make an expedition “par la partie australe où il y a une infinité de terres inhabitées d’autres que de sauvaiges et qui sont en mesme paralelle et climat que la France et l’Angleterre et au plus loing de quarante cinq et cinquante degrez de l’equinoctial, tirant à l’autre Pole, où il y a à faire des Empires et des Monarchies les quelles choses Gilbert en a communicqué avec moy” (“through the southern part where there is an infinity of islands and lands uninhabited by any other than savages and which are in the same latitude and climate zone as France and England and further than forty-five and fifty degrees South of the Equator, where there are empires and kingdoms to be made, concerning which Gilbert had conversed with me”). Gilbert added that he thought the Marquis de la Roche (Troilus de La Roche de Mesgouez) had the same object in mind, but that the land in question was quite big enough for everyone; whoever arrived first should take the left-hand or right-hand course as he pleased, leaving the alternative to the other. Castelnau observed that this was Francisque d’Albaigne’s proposal, which the late Admiral Gaspard II de Coligny had often talked about to him (Castelnau) and that it would not involve touching Spanish or Portuguese possessions; their conquests would be left to the right and the left, following “la droicte ligne du Midy après avoir passé l’equinoxe” (“the direct course to the South after passing the Equator”). Furthermore, cosmographers and pilots who had explored the region said it was “le derriere de la terre ferme pour aller par tout le monde” (“the last continental land to be reached in the world”). Having some knowledge of the matter from d’Albaigne himself and from other pilots (in addition to what he had learned in Portugal), Castelnau ended his report by offering to lead an expedition there in person.

=== Outcome ===
André d’Albaigne submitted his project to Admiral Coligny but, although the Admiral gave favourable consideration to it, all hopes for its implementation disappeared when Coligny was killed in 1572 during the St. Bartholomew's Day massacre. The d’Albaigne project was again advocated a decade later by Lancelot Voisin de La Popelinière when he published his 1582 book Les Trois Mondes, but this met with no response in a France torn by the French Wars of Religion. When French colonization efforts revived in the seventeenth century, they were directed to the exploitation of the fishery and fur resources of Canada (known as New France).
