= Lancelot Voisin de La Popelinière =

French historian (1541–1608)

Henri Lancelot Voisin de La Popelinière (1541–1608), historian and historiographer from eastern Poitou, France. He studied the classics in Paris and then [law?] at the University of Toulouse. He was a Protestant, and took part in the early Wars of Religion as a commander on the Huguenot side. He was excommunicated by the National Synod of Reformed Churches for his publication of the Histoire de France.

His early scholarship included 'translations of works on the art of war and on geography'. In 1571, he published La vraye et entiere histoire de ces derniers troubles [Cologne]. Two other editions followed in 1572 [Basel] and 1573 [La Rochelle]. These served as the basis for his definitive Histoire de France [1581]. Other works include his radical general history Histoire des histoires and the theoretical works Idée de l'histoire accomplie and Dessein de l'histoire nouvelle des francois.

His year of birth has been in dispute and is now set as 1545. He would be excommunicated, in 1581, by the National Synod of Reformed Churches at La Rochelle for his publication of his Histoire de France.

In 1582, he published Les Trois Mondes, a work setting out the history of the discovery of the globe.

== Les Trois Mondes ==
In writing Les Trois Mondes, La Popelinière pursued an explicit geopolitical design by utilizing the cosmographic conjectures, which were at the time quite credible, to theorize a colonial expansion by France into the austral territories. His country, eliminated from colonial competition in the New World after a series of notorious checks in the Americas, could only thenceforward orient her expansion toward this “third world”. He affirmed this explicitly, in declaring “to the ambition of the French is promised the Terre Australe, a territory which could not but be filled with all kinds of goods and things of excellence” (Les Trois Mondes, p. 50). The purely commercial interest of certain French maritime expeditions in the eastern seas was overtaken by a colonial project that foresaw the settlement of a French population in the Antipodes and the creation of a true “France australe”. With regard to the austral lands, La Popelinière was inspired by the voyages of Drake, as well as by the accounts of a Portuguese pilot, Bartolomeu Velho, and by a cosmographer of Italian origin, Andrea D’Albagno. La Popelinière evoked in eloquent terms this unknown “third world” which would complete the Old World and the New World:

There still remains the representation of the third world, of which you would have no knowledge other than that nothing is known about it except that it is a land extending towards the South, or Midi, from thirty degrees beyond the Equator, of much greater extent than the whole of America, only discovered by Magellan when he passed through the strait that is the passage between the Austral land and the southern quarter of America to go to the Moluccas... We know nothing of so fine, so great a country, which can have no less of wealth nor other properties than the Old and New Worlds. Regarding the situation and extent of this third world, it is impossible that there would not be marvelous things and delights, riches and other benefits of life there. Even if there be found there nothing worthy of record, the curiosity of the prince who visits it will always be praiseworthy.

La Popelinière joined a number of his contemporaries in this conception: Guillaume Le Testu, Jean Alfonse, Guillaume Postel, André Thevet. According to him, if France discovered and colonized this third part of the world, the Terra Australis, an unknown and immense land, she would be able to efface the grave fault of not having set foot on the New World since the time of Christopher Columbus. Les Trois Mondes is an invitation to exploration, to adventure, and an appeal to those Frenchmen who would wish to go in the footsteps of Columbus, of Magellan, of Cortes and of Drake. La Popelinière said: “there remain more countries to know than we moderns have discovered”. He even set out the means in explaining that it would not require the finances of a monarch but those of a simple gentleman of means. In fact, La Popelinière had had before his eyes a memoir which developed the hypothesis of an Austral continent. Its author, André d’Albaigne (or D’Albagno), had continued the project of his brother Francesque and of a Portuguese pilot, Bartolomeu Velho, in 1571. The cosmographer André d’Albaigne claimed to possess: “the secrets, charts and necessary instruments for conquering and reducing to the obedience of His Majesty great extent of lands and realms abundant and rich in gold, silver, precious stones, drugs and spiceries”.

== Italo-Portuguese work on a hypothetical continent ==
Francisque and André d'Albaigne were merchants from the Italian city of Lucca. Their name was “Dalbagnio”, according to a notary act of the year 1567, involving their brother Pellegrino, resident at La Rochelle since his marriage to the daughter of the mayor Vincent Nicolas. From Lisbon, where he was an agent of the Bonvisi, Francisque d’Albaigne betook himself to Paris, to propose the occupation of a “certain very rich new land of very great extent not yet discovered by the kings of Spain and Portugal”. He had suborned from the service of the Portuguese the cosmographer Bartholomeu Velho, who came to “demonstrate” to King Charles IX the situation of this unknown country. However Velho died at Nantes on 28 February 1568, and was soon followed to the grave by Francisque. André d’Albaigne took up the proposal of his brother. Warmly recalling how France had come to regret having dismissed Christopher Columbus, he now also promised the discovery of a new part of the world, at seven months voyage, with “realms abundant and rich in gold, silver, precious stones, drugs and spiceries”. No doubt André d’Albaigne had inherited from Velho some certainties regarding this hypothetical continent. La Popelinière, who was inspired by his memoir, specified in 1582 that what he was concerned with was “a land stretching from the South, or Midi, to thirty degrees from the Equator, of much greater extent than all of America, only discovered by Magellan when he passed through the strait between this Austral land and the southern quarter of America to go to the Moluccas”.

Although the geographical destination of this enterprise was not plainly stated anywhere in the relevant correspondence, the chief modern authority on the matter, E.-T. Hamy, suggested that the real purpose, though concealed in vague and cryptic language, was to explore and colonize the unknown continent of Terra Australis. As Kenneth Andrews has commented, this thesis cannot be proved, and has evidently failed to convince some other authorities, but it must be taken seriously in the light of references to Francesco's project contained in the dispatches of Michel de Castelnau de la Mauvissière, French ambassador in London, during the period 1577-1580 when he reported on the voyages of John Frobisher, Humphrey Gilbert and Francis Drake. Reporting upon the return of Drake in November 1580, the ambassador mentioned Francisque d’Albaigne in connection with Drake's alleged sighting, after passing the Cape of Good Hope, of “une des terres australles et meridionalle qui ne sont descouvertes”, the same lands d’Albaigne had proposed for conquest.

=== Motivations of the Italo-Portuguese project ===
What the real objects of the Italo-Portuguese project were it is impossible to determine. Velho's 1561 chart of the New World is remarkable for its authoritative treatment of Brazil, La Plata, and Peru. It shows “Potosi”, as well as “Valdepariso” in Chile. South of the Strait of Magellan, Tierra del Fuego appears as in the conventional form of an ambiguous tip of a potential continental mass otherwise not delineated. Velho was evidently much more interested in South America than in Terra Australis, but such map evidence carries very little weight. The world map in the Cosmography that Velho compiled in 1568 for the benefit of King Charles IX at the request of Francesco d’Albagno is noteworthy for not having any representation whatever of the southern continent, which would appear to confirm that he had no interest in Terra Australis.

=== Discoveries linked to the hypothesis ===
Castelnau first mentioned “d’Albaigne” in October 1577 when reporting Frobisher's alleged discovery of gold mines. He thought these vast gold-bearing lands “vers le Nort” must be those d’Albaigne had offered to acquire for Charles years before. In July 1578 he reported that one Gilbert (Humphrey Gilbert) had the queen's permission to make an expedition “par la partie australe où il y a une infinité de terres inhabitées d’autres que de sauvaiges et qui sont en mesme paralelle et climat que la France et l’Angleterre et au plus loing de quarante cinq et cinquante degrez de l’equinoctial, tirant à l’autre Pole, où il y a à faire des Empires et des Monarchies les quelles choses Gilbert en a communicqué avec moy (by the southern part where there is an infinity of lands uninhabited except for savages, which are in the same latitude and climate as France and England and at a distance of forty-five tofifty degrees from the Equator, taken from the other Pole, where there are empires and kingdoms to be made; which matters Gilbert had spoken about with me)”. Gilbert had added that he thought the Marquis de la Roche had the same object in mind, but that the land in question was quite big enough for everyone: whoever arrived first should take the left hand or the right hand course as he pleased, leaving the alternative to the other. Castelnau observed that this was Francisque d’Albaigne's proposal, which the late Gaspard de Coligny had often talked about to him, Castelnau, and that it would not involve touching Spanish or Portuguese possessions, since their conquests would be left to the right and the left, following “la droicte ligne du Midy après avoir passé l’equinoxe (the direct course to the South after passing the Equator)”. Furthermore, cosmographers who had written about it and pilots who had been there said it was “le derriere de la terre ferme pour aller par tout le monde (the last continental land reached in all the world)”. Having some knowledge of the matter from d’Albaigne himself and from other pilots in addition to what he had learned when in Portugal, Castelnau ended his report by offering to lead an expedition there in person. Finally, in November 1580, reporting upon the return of Drake, the ambassador again mentioned Francisque d’Albaigne in connection with Drake's alleged sighting, after passing the Cape of Good Hope, of “une des terres australles et meridionalle qui ne sont descouvertes (one of the undiscovered austral and southern lands)”, lands the Italian had proposed for conquest.

Unfortunately, a France exhausted by the French Wars of Religion was hardly in a state to respond to La Popelinière's maritime and colonial proposals.

== See also ==
- Dieppe maps
- Identifiants et Référentiels
