= Bartolomeu Velho =

Portuguese cartographer

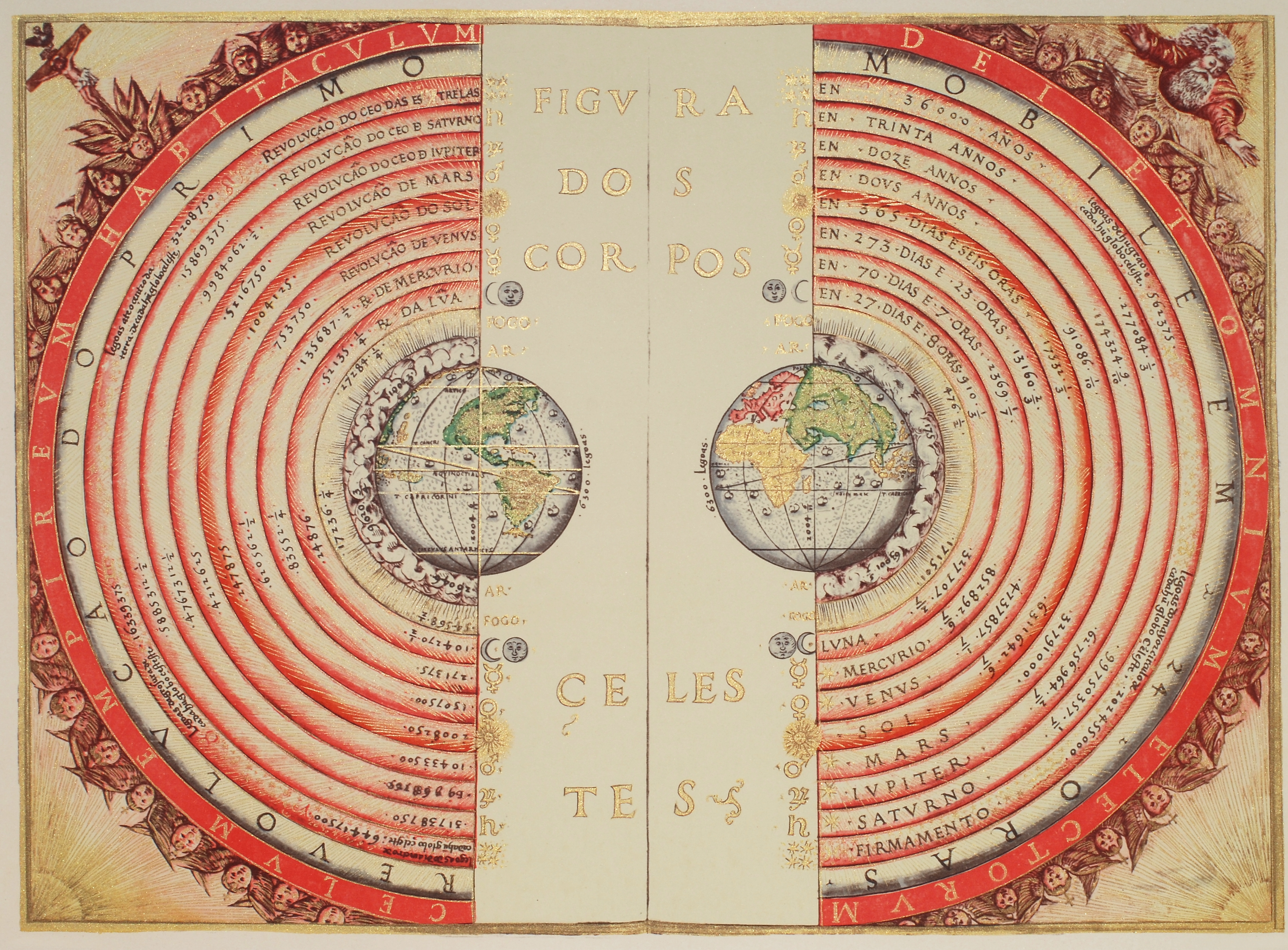
Original - Figure of the celestial bodies - Illustration of the Ptolemaic geocentric model of the Universe by Bartolomeu Velho. Taken from Cosmographia (Bibilotèque National, Paris).

Bartolomeu Velho (died 1568) was a sixteenth-century Portuguese cartographer and cosmographer.

Velho prepared the Carta General do Orbe (General Chart of the Globe) in 1561 for Sebastian of Portugal.

He moved to France where he worked on his treatise Cosmographia which was published in Paris in 1568, the year of his death.
