= List of ambassadors of France to Spain =

The Ambassador of France to Spain is the highest legal representative of France to the Kingdom of Spain through the Embassy of France in Spain.

== Ambassadors of France to Spain ==
Start Date	End Date	Ambassador	References
1486	1486	De Clerieux; De Bouchage; De Grammont	ambassadeur; ambassadeur; ambassadeur
1525	1525	François de Tournon	
1533	1533	Georges de Selve	
	1539	Antoine de Castelnau	
1539	1539	Robert Ceneau, Bishop of Avranches (1532-1560),	ambassadeur
1559	1562	Sébastien de L'Aubespine, Bishop of Limoges	ambassadeur
1562	1565	Jean Ébrard, Seigneur de Saint-Sulpice	ambassadeur
1565	1572	Raymond de Rouer de Pavie de Beccarie, Baron de Fourquevaux	ambassadeur
1572	1582	Jean de Vivonne, baron de Saint-Gouard	ambassadeur
1582	1590	Pierre de Ségusson, sieur de Longlée	ambassadeur
1589	1589	Pierre Forget de Fresnes	envoyé
1598	1598	Nicolas Brûlart de Sillery	plénipotentiares pour la paix de Vérvins
1600	1601	Antoine de Silly, Comte de La Rochepot	ambassadeur
1608	1608	François Savary de Brèves	ambassadeur
1609	1609	de Vaucelles	ambassadeur
1611	1611	Charles, Duke of Mayenne	ambassadeur extraordinaire
1612	1612	Pierre Brûlart, marquis de Sillery, vicomte de Puisieux	ambassadeur extraordinaire
1614		Noël Brûlart de Sillery	
1617	1617	Claude de Beaufremont de Beaufremont, Marquis de Senecay	ambassadeur
1618	1618	Antoine de Silly, de Rochepot	ambassadeur
1621	1621	François de Bassompierre	ambassadeur extraordinaire
1625	1625	Charles d'Angennes, Marquis de Angennes	ambassadeur extraordinaire
1627	1627	Jésuite Claude de Lingendes	agent
1628	1628	de Boissy; Berthier; Guillaume Bautru, comte de Serrant	chargé d'une mission
1629	1629	Antoine-Joubert comte de Barrault	ambassadeur
1635	1635	Peni	chargé d'affaires
1637	1637	Pujol, (Le sieur de Moret juge de Pujols et habitant de Monflanquin)	chargé d'affaires
1638	1638	de Chavigny; le comte d' Harcourt; L'archevêque de Bordeaux	plénipotentiaire;plénipotentiaire;plénipotentiaire
1640	1640	fr:Bernard du Plessis-Besançon	plénipotentiaire
1644	1644	Urbain de Maillé-Brézé, duc de Brezé and Jean Armand de Maillé-Brézé, duc de Fronsac	plénipotentiaire
1649	1649	Dufresne	envoyé
1651	1651	de Croissy	plénipotentiaire
1656	1656	de Lyonne	ministre plénipotentiaire
1659	1659	Antoine III de Gramont	ambassadeur extraordinaire
1661	1667	Georges d'Aubusson de la Feuillade, Archbishop of Embrun	ambassadeur
1668	1668	Pierre de Villars, Marquis de Villars	envoyé extraordinaire
1669	1669	Dupré	chargé d'affaires
1670	1670	Piero de Bonzi, Archbishop of Toulouse	ambassadeur extraordinaire
1671	1671	Pierre de Villars, Marquis de Villars	ambassadeur extraordinaire
1679	1679	Francois de Pas, Comte de Rebenac; Le Prince d'Harcourt	ambassadeur extraordinaire; ambassadeur extraordinaire
1682	1682	André Berhoulet de Formenteau, Comte de La Vauguyon	ambassadeur
1685	1685	fr:Isaac de Pas de Feuquières, Marquis de Feuquiéres	ambassadeur extraordinaire
1688	1688	Levasseur; Francois de Pas, Comte de Rebenac	chargé d'affaires; ambassadeur extraordinaire
1691	1691	le P. Blandiniére	chargé d'une missionS.540
1697	1697	le P. Duval	chargé d'une mission
1698	1698	Henry d'Harcourt	ambassadeur
1700	1700	Jean-Denis marquis de Blécourt	envoyé extraordinaire
1700	1700	Henry d'Harcourt	ambassadeur extraordinaire
1701	1701	fr:Charles Auguste d'Allonville de Louville	sans caractère
1701	1701	Ferdinand de Marsin	ambassadeur extraordinaire
1702	1702	César d'Estrées	
1703	1703	Jean d'Estrées	
1703	1703	fr:Pierre Antoine de Châteauneuf	
1704	1704	Antoine Charles de Gramont	
1705	1705	Michel Amelot de Gournay, Marquis de Gournay	
1705	1705	Louis, Marquis of Brancas and Prince of Nisaro	
1707	1707	François Pidou de Saint Olon, chevalier de Saint-Olon	
1709	1709	Charles François de la Bonde d'Iberville	
1709	1709	Jean-Denis marquis de Blécourt	
1710	1710	Adrien Maurice de Noailles	
1711	1713	Jean-Louis d'Usson, Marquis de Bonnac	
1713	1713	Louis, Marquis of Brancas and Prince of Nisaro (2nd term)	
1714	1714	Paul-Hippolyte de Beauvilliers, Duke of Saint-Aignan	
1718	1718	Louis Aimé Théodore de Dreux, marquis de Nancré	
1720	1720	Jean-Baptiste Louis Andrault de Maulévrier	
1720	1720	M. Robin	sans caractère
1720	1720	fr:René de Mornay-Montchevreuil, Abbé de Mornay	
1721	1721	Louis de Rouvroy, duc de Saint-Simon	
1721	1721	Philippe Charles de La Fare	
1722	1722	Théodore Chevignard de Chavigny, comte de Toulongeon	
1723	1723	Louis, Duke of Orléans	
1723	1723	Marquis de Coulanges	
1724	1724	René de Froulay de Tessé	
1725	1725	François Sanguin de Livry, Abbé de Livry	
1727	1727	Conrad-Alexandre comte de Rottembourg	
1728	1728	Louis, Marquis of Brancas and Prince of Nisaro (3rd term)	
1730	1730	M. Hullin	chargé d'affaires
1730	1730	Conrad-Alexandre comte de Rottembourg	(1684-1735)
1733	1733	Jean-Gabriel de La Porte du Theil	chargé d'affaires
1734	1734	M. de La Beaune	chargé d'affaires
1734	1734	François-Marie de Villers-la-Faye, Comte de Vaulgrenant	
1738	1738	M. de Champeaux	chargé d'affaires
1738	1738	M. de Varennes	chargé d'affaires
1738	1738	Louis Pierre Engelbert, Count of la Marck	
1741	1741	M. de Varennes	chargé d'affaires
1741	1749	Louis-Gui de Guérapin de Vauréal, bishop of Rennes	
1749	1749	Jean-Baptiste Partyet	chargé d'affaires
1749	1749	François-Marie de Villers-la-Faye, Count de Vaulgrenant	
1752	1752	Abbé de Frischmann	chargé d'affaires
1752	1755	Emmanuel-Félicité de Durfort	
1755	1755	Abbé de Frischmann	chargé d'affaires
1756	1759	Henri Joseph Bouchard d'Esparbès de Lussan d'Aubeterre, Marquis d'Aubeterre	
1759	1777	Pierre Paul, Marquis of Ossun	
1777	1784	Armand Marc, comte de Montmorin	
1784	1784	Jean-François de Bourgoing	
1785	1790	Paul François de Quelen de La Vauguyon	
1790	1790	Louis Marc Pons, marquis de Pons, Marquis de Grignols	
1792	1792	Jean-François de Bourgoing	
1796	1796	Catherine-Dominique de Pérignon	
1797	1797	Laurent Jean François Truguet	
1798	1798	fr:Ferdinand Guillemardet	Ferdinand Guillemardet by Francisco de Goya painted in 1798.
1799	1800	Charles-Jean-Marie Alquier	
1800	1801	Lucien Bonaparte	
1801	1802	Laurent de Gouvion Saint-Cyr	
1802	1806	Pierre de Ruel, marquis de Beurnonville	
1806	1808	François de Beauharnais	
1808	1813	Antoine de Laforêt	
1818	1818	Anne-Adrien-Pierre de Montmorency-Laval, Duc de Laval and de San Fernando Luis, Grandee of Spain	
1822	1822	fr:Auguste Delagarde	
1823	1823	fr:Louis Justin Marie de Talaru	
1824	1824	Charles-Joseph-Edmond, Count de Bois-le-Comte (1796-1863)	
1825	1825	Clément Édouard de Moustier, son of Elénor-François-Elie, Comte de Moustier	
1826	1830	Emmanuel Louis Marie Guignard de Saint-Priest, 1st Duke of Almazán	
1832	1836	fr:Maximilien Gérard de Rayneval	
1836	1837	fr:Septime de Faÿ de La Tour-Maubourg	
1838	1839	fr:Raymond Aimery de Montesquiou-Fezensac	
1841	1847	Charles Joseph, comte Bresson	
1846	1846	Louis, duc Decazes	envoyé extraordinaire
1858	1864	Adolphe Barrot	
1864	1870	Henri Mercier	
1871	1874	René, marquis de Bouillé	
1874	1878	fr:Jean-Baptiste Alexandre Damaze de Chaudordy	
1878	1882	Benjamin Jaurès	
1882		fr:Louis Andrieux	
1886	1890	Paul Cambon	
1891		Théodore Roustan	
1894		Frederic Guéau, Marquis de Reverseaux	
1898	1902	Jules Patenôtre des Noyers	
1902	1907	Jules Cambon	
1907	1909	Paul Révoil	
1910	1917	Léon Geoffray	
1917	1918	Joseph Thierry	
1918		Gabriel Alapetite	
1920	1920	Charles de Beaupoil, comte de Saint-Aulaire	
1920	1923	Jules-Albert Defrance	
1923		Jacques de Fontenay	
1924	1929	fr:Emmanuel de Peretti de La Rocca	(1870-1958)
1929	1931	Charles Corbin	
1931	1936	Jean Herbette	(1878-1960)
1936	1938	fr:Eirik Labonne	
1939	1940	Philippe Pétain	
1940	1944	François Piétri	
1945	1951	fr:Bernard Hardion	
1951	1954	Jacques Meyrier	
1954	1959	Guy Le Roy de La Tournelle	
1959	1962	Roland de Margerie	
1962	1964	Armand de Blanquet du Chayla	
1964	1970	Robert Barbara de Labelotterie de Boisseson	
1970	1976	Robert Gillet	
1976	1977	Jean-François Deniau	
1977	1981	Emmanuel Jacquin de Margerie	
1981	1983	de:Raoul Delaye	
1983	1985	fr:Pierre Guidoni	
1985	1988	fr:Francis Gutmann	
1988	1993	Henri Benoît de Coignac	
1993	1996	André Gadaud	
1996	2000	Patrick Leclercq	
2000	2002	Alfred Siefer-Gaillardin	
2002	2005	fr:Olivier Schrameck	
2005	2007	Claude Blanchemaison	
2007	2012	fr:Bruno Delaye	
2012	2015	es:Jérôme Bonnafont	
2015	2019	fr:Yves Saint-Geours	
2019		fr:Jean-Michel Casa	

== See also ==
- France–Spain relations
- List of Ambassadors of Spain to France

== Sources ==
- Gellard, Matthieu (2014). Une Reine Épistolaire: Lettres et Pouvoir au Temps de Catherine de Médicis. Classiques Garnier.
