= Langeron (surname) =

Langeron is a commune in central France. People with the surname of Langeron include:

- Jean-Baptiste Louis Andrault de Maulévrier-Langeron (1677–1754), French military and diplomat.
- Louis Alexandre Andrault de Langeron (1763–1831), French general in the Imperial Russian Army during the Napoleonic Wars
- Maurice Langeron (1874–1950), French mycologist, bryologist, and paleobotanist
- Teodor Andrault de Langeron (c. 19th century), Russian official in Congress Poland; President of Warsaw

== See also ==
- Cape Langeron, Ukrainian promontory extending into the Gulf of Odessa
