= Jean Ébrard, Seigneur de Saint-Sulpice =

16th Century French noble and diplomat

Jean Ébrard seigneur de Saint-Sulpice
- Saint-Sulpice's coat of arms, displaying the dual colliers of the royal orders

9th French Ambassador to Spain
- In office May 1562 – October 1565
- Preceded by: Bishop of Limoges
- Succeeded by: Baron de Fourquevaux

Personal details
- Born: 26 August 1519
- Died: 5 November 1581 (aged 62)
- Spouse: Claude de Gontaut
- Relations: Christophe Ébrard, abbot of Marcilhac
- Children: Henri; Armand; Antoine; Bertrand; Catherine
- Parents: Antoine Ébrard, seigneur de Saint-Sulpice (father); Marguerite de Lévis (mother)

Jean Ébrard, seigneur de Saint-Sulpice (26 August 1519–5 November 1581) was a French noble, governor, soldier and diplomat during the latter Italian Wars and the French Wars of Religion. Born into the first family of the province of Quercy, Saint-Sulpice began his military service during the reign of Francis I of France, seeing service at the siege of Boulogne in 1544. Under his successor Henri II. Saint-Sulpice operated as a client of the constable Montmorency and fought at the defence of Metz in 1552 and capture of Calais in 1558. During Henri's reign he began his diplomatic role and was tasked with presenting Henri's position to the delegates negotiating the Peace of Cateau-Cambrésis after a shift in the crown's position. He received a further diplomatic role securing the withdrawal of French forces from Siena as a term of the peace.

During the reign of Charles IX he moved to be a patron of the queen mother Catherine. He led two further diplomatic missions, first to Spain and then Portugal in 1560 and 1561 respectively. In mid 1562 he replaced the bishop of Limoges as the French ambassador to Spain. In this role he unsuccessfully campaigned to get Spain to declare war on England after the latter's entry into the first French War of Religion in September 1562. When Spain objected to the peace that the French crown negotiated with the rebels Saint-Sulpice and Catherine took the line that Spain should not trouble itself with French internal affairs. In the crisis over the excommunication of the queen of Navarre Saint-Sulpice relayed information of a Spanish plot against her to the French court thus aiding in its neutralisation. He counselled taking a course of caution during further disputes with Spain over Papal precedence and a rebellion in Corsica. Throughout this period Catherine had hoped for a personal meeting with Philip and Saint-Sulpice helped arrange this meeting which was to transpire at Bayonne in June 1565. Philip would not participate however but rather his wife Élisabeth. His efforts to convince Philip of the wisdom of a new royal marriage between the kingdoms was a failure. Relieved of his charge in 1565 he returned to the French court where he had been established as a conseiller d'État (councillor of state). During the second war of religion he fought at the battle of Saint-Denis. Absent from his territories in the third war of religion, his relatives endeavoured to secure the preservation of the families lands in Quercy. When the surintendant de la maison (superintendent of the household) of the king's brother Alençon died in 1569, Saint-Sulpice replaced him, and used the position to insert many of his children into Alençon's household. In this capacity he would be with Alençon during the siege of La Rochelle at which one of his sons was killed. During the fourth war of religion Saint-Sulpice engaged in internal diplomatic efforts and was tasked with the arrest of the governor of Languedoc the baron de Damville.

After the death of Charles and the ascent of his brother Anjou as Henri III, Saint-Sulpice found his position in Alençon's household compromised by his rebellion. In August 1576 he departed from the role and was soon followed by his relatives. At the Estates General called as a term of the peace his eldest son Henri Ébrard was killed by one of Alençon's men. Saint-Sulpice was one of the diplomats involved in the negotiations that brought the sixth war of religion to a close in September 1577. The king subsequently tasked him with a role in the peace's enforcement. Saint-Sulpice joined with Catherine for a new internal peace effort in August 1578, crossing much of southern France in a mission that concluded with the Treaty of Nérac which established him as a commissioner for the peace in Guyenne. As a reward he was made a chevalier (knight) of the Ordre du Saint-Esprit (Order of the Saint-Esprit) the most senior order of French chivalry. He died on 5 November 1581 and was succeeded to his titles by his son Bertrand.

== Early life and family ==
Jean Ébrard was born on 26 August 1519, the second son of Antoine Ébrard (–1563) and Marguerite de Lévis. He had a full brother Christophe Ébrard, the abbot of Marcilhac in Quercy. He also had a half brother Nicolas Ébrard, the sieur de Cluset from his father's second marriage, and a half sister Jeanne Ébrard who married René de Pins-Montbrun. Jean helped facilitate the marriage of his half brother to an heiress named Vignan. His father fought several times for the king but generally preferred to maintain a rural existence.

The Ébrard family traced the possession of their various lands between Cahors and Figeac back to the 13th century. They enjoyed relations with many important families of the region such as the Cardaillac, Gourdon, Vaillac, Lauzières, Thémines, Genouillac, Estang and Arpajon. In the late 15th century the family took advantage of litigation to increase the value of the cens (tax for usage of the land) on the grounds that the lands value was greater than it had been in prior generations. As their influence grew, so too did their social horizons, and ties were formed with the Flezins-Montmurat in Auvergne and Pins-Montbrun in Gascogne. The Ébrards were the premier barons (first barons) of Quercy through the title of baron de Saint-Sulpice.

=== Education ===
Antoine and his predecessor seigneurs de Saint-Sulpice had little education beyond that which prepared them for a military career. At Antoine's instigation, this changed for Jean. His son had a significant education, first at Cahors and then Toulouse. He completed his studies in 1543 at the Università degli studi di Ferrara (University of Ferrara) where he became a doctor in utroque, meaning he could practice both civil and canon law.

Saint-Sulpice's career at court began when he was established as an écuyer (squire) of Francis I of France.

=== Marriage and children ===
In 1551 (Boucher) or 1553 (Jouanna) Jean married Claude de Gontaut. This marriage fostered connections with the Biron (she was the sister of the marshal de Biron and a captain of Coligny's), Noailles, Lanssac and des Cars families. The Biron were also the first family of the Périgord, making the match advantageous. Claude was a Protestant, and Saint-Sulpice adopted a position of moderate Catholicism, open to the friendship of Protestant seigneurs. Indeed, the Spanish ambassador Álava suspected him of Protestantism in 1566.

With Claude de Gontaut, Saint-Sulpice would have six children, among whom were:

- Henri Ébrard (1553–1576), comte de Nègrepelisse jure uxoris, capitaine de la chevau-légers (captain of the light-horse), married the comtesse de Nègrepelisse without issue.
- Armand Ébrard (1556–1573), seigneur de Comiac, ensigne-colonelle de l'infantrie de France (ensign-colonel of the French infantry), died of wounds sustained at the siege of La Rochelle.
- Antoine Ébrard (1559–1600), bishop of Cahors (1576), conseiller d'État (1585).
- Bertrand Ébrard (1560–1587), sénéchal and governor of Quercy (1584) and Rouergue (1585), married Marguerite de Balaguier with issue, died of wounds sustained at Coutras.
- Catherine Ébrard (–1621), married the seigneur de Thémines and future marshal of France in 1587 with issue.

In 1566 Saint-Sulpice brought his three eldest sons (Antoine, Armand and Henri) to the prestigious Collège de Navarre in Paris, where the highest nobility in the kingdom received their education. Among the alumni of the collège were the children of the ducs de Guise, Aumale and Vendôme. Only Antoine would undertake a thorough education at the institution however, while Henri and Armand undertook the 'education of a gentleman' (music and martial pursuits - their horse riding taught to them by the tutor of the duc d'Anjou). On 12 December 1566, Saint-Sulpice presented his eldest son Henri to the king Charles. He was warmly received by the king's brothers and the king's mother Catherine.

The royal favour that his son Henri enjoyed allowed Saint-Sulpice to negotiate a spectacular marriage for him in 1576 with the comtesse de Nègrepelisse. The baron provided his son an income of 5,000 livres at this time. Saint-Sulpice reminded his sons of the bonds between the Ébrard family and the Lévis family and indicated a desire to see a marriage between the comte de Caylus and a member of his household.

=== Land and income ===
In 1569 the seigneurie of Comiac was usurped from the Saint-Sulpice family by two Reyrevignes brothers. Saint-Sulpice entrusted his brother the abbot of Marcilhac with bringing together their allies to make the elder Reyrevignes brother understand this deed would not go unpunished. After the matter had been put before the sénéchal of Villeneuve en Rouergue the land was returned to the Saint-Sulpice. It was apparent the brothers' claim was not entirely without merit and thus they were compensated for returning the territory to the Ébrards. After this episode Reyrevignes, impressed by Saint-Sulpice's network offered himself to Saint-Sulpice's service.

Around 1572 Saint-Sulpice's various lordships brought him revenues of approximately 12,000 livres. Beyond his lands he could count on his pension as a member of the conseil privé (3,000 livres), the incomes of his roles in the household of the king's brother Alençon (2,000 livres) and his income from governing part of the prince's appanage (1,000 livres). This totalled to 18,000 livres.

== Reign of Francis I ==
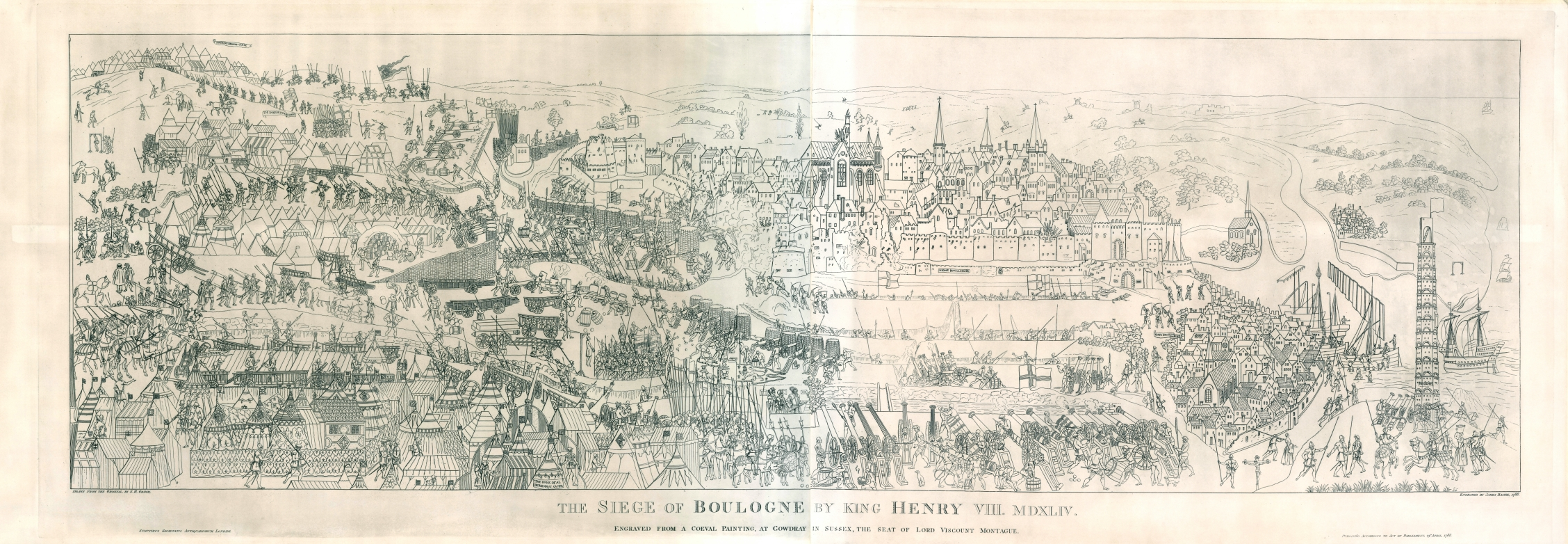
Henry VIII's siege of Boulogne

In 1544 Saint-Sulpice saw service at the first siege of Boulogne in the defence against the English.

== Reign of Henri II ==
When the Scottish expedition was undertaken by France during the war of the Rough Wooing, Saint-Sulpice travelled to Scotland to fight the English.

=== Final Italian War ===
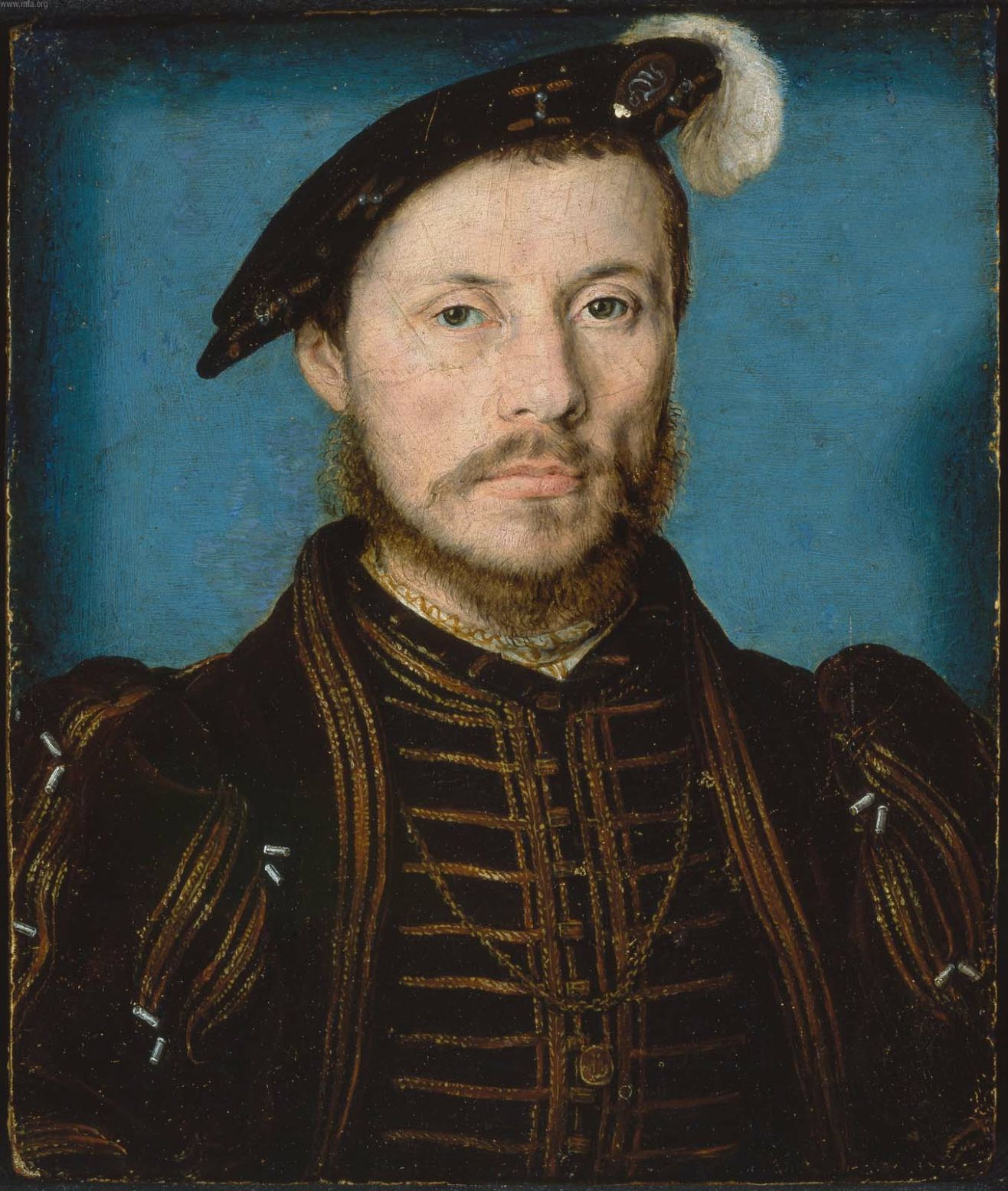
Constable of France, Anne de Montmorency who served as Saint-Sulpice's political protector in his early career

Saint-Sulpice fought under the command of the constable of France Montmorency during the Italian Wars. He saw service at the capture of Metz and was then in the city for its successful defence against the Emperor's siege later that year.

With the collapse of the Truce of Vaucelles in 1557, Saint-Sulpice was tasked with meeting with Philip's ambassador Simon Renard on the kingdom's border. That same year, his patron the constable Montmorency was captured by the Imperials. Saint-Sulpice would play a role in the negotiations for Montmorency's release.

=== Royal favour ===
He was established as a gentilhomme de la chambre du roi (gentleman of the king's chamber) by Henri II in 1558. This position was granted to him in survivance of his father-in-law the baron de Biron.

Having fought in Picardy, Saint-Sulpice participated in the successful capture of Calais from the English in 1558.

=== Cateau-Cambrésis ===
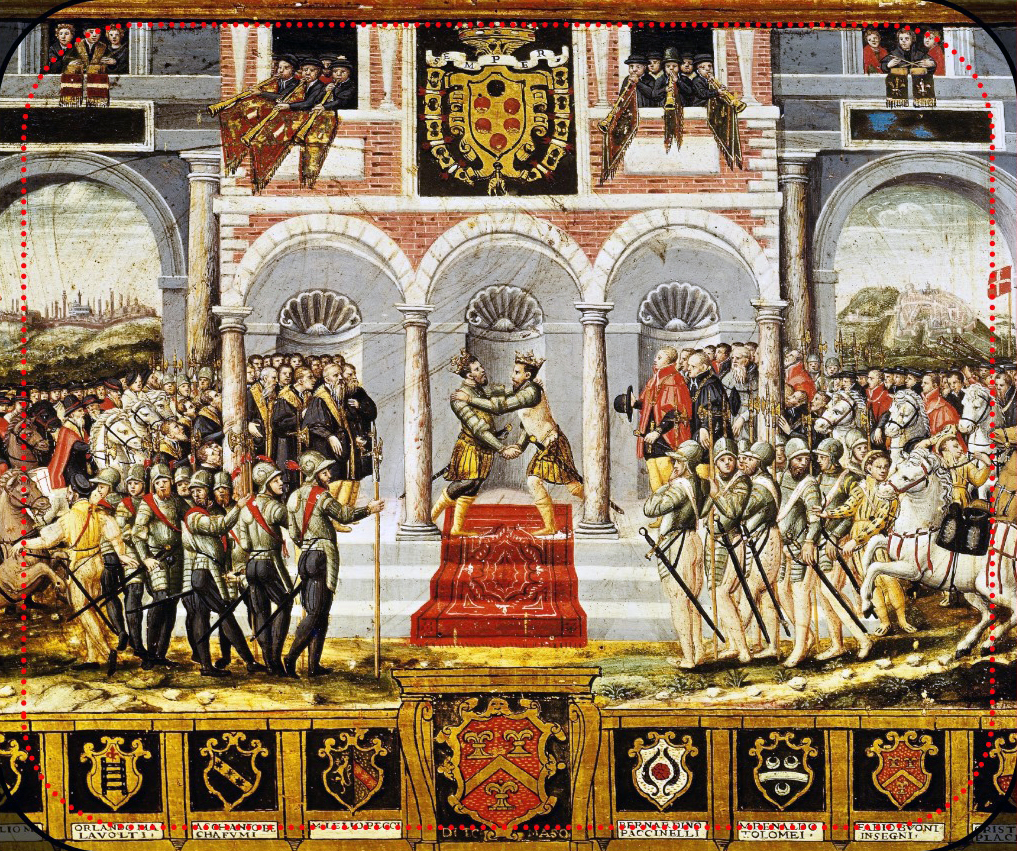
Henri II and Philip II embrace at the signing of the peace of Cateau-Cambrésis

In the evening of 14 November 1559, while peace negotiations with Spain were ongoing, Catherine and the duc de Guise implored Henri not to surrender French Piedmont as part of any treaty. The former denounced the constable Montmorency crying that he had always done the king evil. Henri retorted that it was rather those of the war party who had convinced him to break the 1556 Truce of Vaucelles who had done him wrong. On 15 November, Henri summoned his council and announced to the assembled grandees that he had resolved on making peace with the Spanish king Philip II even if this meant the returning of the majority of the French conquests of the Italian Wars including Corsica, Piedmont and parts of Luxembourg. Only the archbishop of Vienne protested, but he was silenced. Saint-Sulpice was ordered to travel to Cercamp, where the delegates had been discussing terms of a peace to inform them of Henri's resolution. By this means he was also to reverse the instructions given to the bishop of Limoges ordering the withdrawal of the French delegates from the negotiations. Saint-Sulpice was also to see to the return of Montmorency to the French court so that he might be reunited with Henri.

While talks had been stalling at Cercamp, Saint-Sulpice's arrival so dramatically altered the position of the French delegates, that the Spanish wondered whether it was some sort of ploy. Only the matter of Calais was left as a thorn to the establishment of an agreement. Saint-Sulpice repeated Henri's position on Calais that the king would lose his crown before surrendering Calais.

On 6 February 1559 peace was concluded at Cateau-Cambrésis. One term of the peace the French abandoned the Sienese territory of Montalcino which had been under their 'protection'.

Saint-Sulpice was again entrusted with a diplomatic mission by Henri on 9 July when he was sent to the French secured Repubblica di Siena riparata in Montalcino (Sienese republic which was based in Montalcino) to oversee the handover of the territory to the 'protection' of the Spanish. On 18 July word arrived of the death of Henri II, with hope quickly spreading that the French withdrawal might be reversed, however it was confirmed by the new administration.

== Reign of Charles IX ==
=== Catherine's man ===
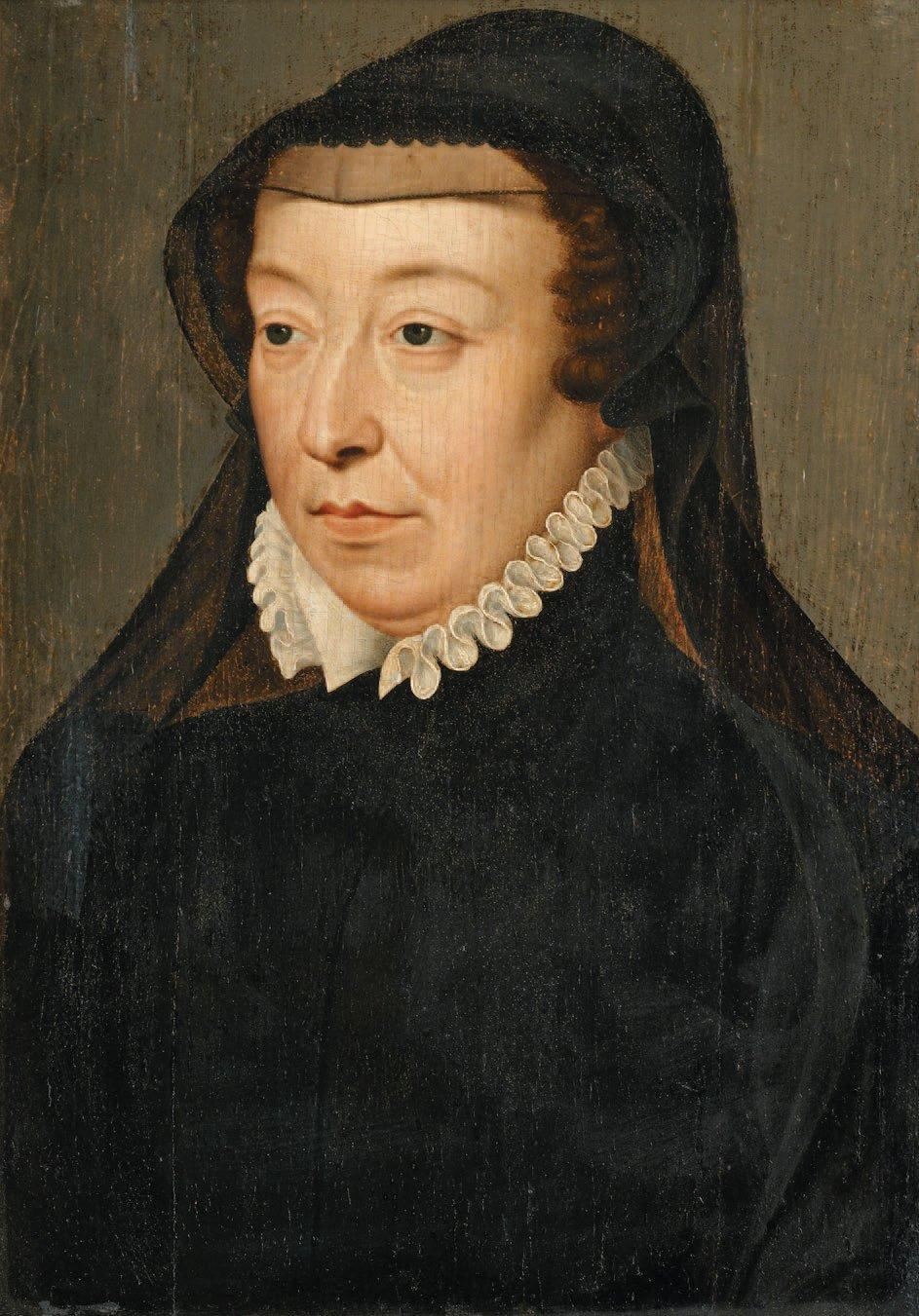
Queen Mother Catherine wife of Henri II, mother of three French kings and political patron to Saint-Sulpice for the latter half of his career

Though he had been in Montmorency's orbit, Saint-Sulpice became a client of the queen mother Catherine. Gellard describes him as an 'unwavering' supporter of the queen mother. His wife was established as one of her ladies in waiting. The influential position he was to enjoy derived from his relationship with her as opposed to his local authority. Haan differentiates Saint-Sulpice from the label of 'courtier' though emphasises that he endeavoured to maintain a proximity to the crown.

In 1560 Saint-Sulpice undertook extraordinary diplomatic missions to Madrid.

In the Spring of 1561, Saint-Sulpice lead an extraordinary mission to Portugal. Meeting with the Portuguese king he spent only a few weeks in the country before his return. He was then entrusted with a diplomatic mission to Provence.

In June 1561, while at court in Catherine's entourage, king Charles promised Saint-Sulpice the captaincy of the first compagnie d'ordonnance that became vacant. This promise was realised in the December of that year. Tied up in court, his brother, the abbot of Marcilhac, and his wife oversaw the recruitment of men for his compagnie, a process they began before the captaincy had been bestowed on Saint-Sulpice formally. Men were recruited from Gascogne, Quercy and the Toulousian provinces. The role of guidon was granted to Saint-Sulpice's son Henri. Although in the coming years he would fight in the royal armies, he would not personally lead his compagnie d'ordonnance.

=== Ambassador ===
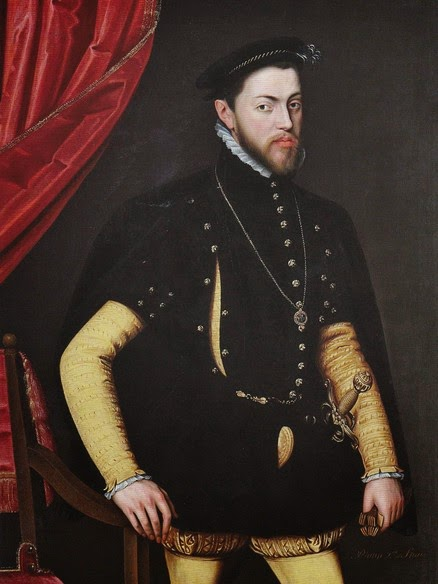
Philip II, King of Spain

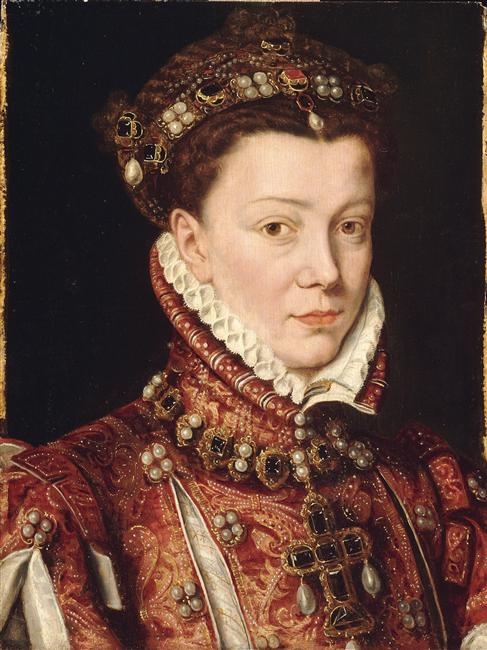
Élisabeth, queen of Spain and daughter of Catherine

In June 1562 Saint-Sulpice was made the ordinary French ambassador to Spain. He had begun his residency in May, however there was an overlap between the end of one diplomatic tenure (the bishop of Limoges') and the start of another.

Cloulas characterises the ambassadorships of the bishop of Limoges, Saint-Sulpice and the baron de Fourquevaux as timid missions, in contrast to those of the Spanish ambassadors, Thomas Perrenot de Granvelle (known as Chantonnay) and Álava. All three French ambassadors of this period were men of experience who had enjoyed a career in which they had 'proved themselves'.

As ambassador to Spain, Saint-Sulpice would be Catherine's ninth most corresponded to diplomat during her time as queen mother. He received 54 letters from her in his residency. The French ambassadors to Spain would receive royal correspondence far more frequently than their Spanish counterparts in France did during the 1560s. He in turn wrote back to Catherine 93 times. It was only irregularly that Saint-Sulpice would write to the sécretaires d'État (secretaries of state), with letters to L'Aubespine and Fresne only constituting 5% of his correspondence. As ambassador Saint-Sulpice would also be in correspondence with his future replacement, Fourquevaux who told him in 1564 that if he had important matters to impart that he should write them covertly using orange juice.

Catherine's daughter, Élisabeth, the queen of Spain was a useful conduit for Saint-Sulpice during his ambassadorship. She explained the king's intentions to Saint-Sulpice in May 1563 much to Saint-Sulpice's delight. Saint-Sulpice and his successor Fourquevaux would regularly consult with Élisabeth and broach the subjects they intended to discuss with Philip prior to audiences with the king. After a very difficult pregnancy in August 1564 for Élisabeth during which it was feared that she would die, the queen's recovery induced celebrations across Spain. Saint-Sulpice reported on various celebratory processions, along with public and private devotions.

As ambassador, Saint-Sulpice enjoyed an income of 7,200 livres. Like many other ambassadors, Saint-Sulpice would make appeals to the French court asking for his relief from the charge. Such arguments were typically based on grounds of age, illness, financial ruin, and the duration of his residence. In 1564 Saint-Sulpice described his distance from Catherine and the French court as an 'oblivion'. Saint-Sulpice further complained during his residence in Spain that his properties were subject to attacks from Protestants.

He brought with him to Spain his cousin, a minor nobleman named La Mothe-Fénelon who served him as a courier during his residency. Saint-Sulpice continually sang La Mothe-Fénelon's praises in his despatches to Catherine during his residency. La Mothe-Fénelon would go on to be established as the French ambassador to England. In great part Saint-Sulpice relied on French couriers, and only four times referenced providing his despatches to foreign couriers. The Spanish ambassadors despatches by contrast were often entrusted to French couriers.

=== First French War of Religion ===
In the first audience he enjoyed of his residency, Saint-Sulpice waxed lyrical about Franco-Spanish friendship. He spoke of the alliance between the two forming the basis for a 'perpetual confederation' by which god would be eternally honoured and maintained in each of their sizable territories.

In July 1562 Saint-Sulpice received requests from the royalist Catholics of Bordeaux who wished for Spanish reinforcements to secure their position.The lieutenant-general of Guyenne, seigneur de Monluc, future lieutenant-general of Guyenne, and the governor of Bayonne all made such requests. The new ambassador was irritated by all the requests, complaining that 'men of war are not assembled as easily as canons in the chapterhouse'. Saint-Sulpice was not overly favourable to the prospect of relying on Spanish support, fearing that it could lead to the foreign domination of France.

Recently established in Spain, Saint-Sulpice corresponded with the duc de Guise who was jointly leading the royal armies in France in September 1562. Meanwhile, the governor of Narbonne kept him appraised of developments in the war in Languedoc and Provence.

With the intervention of the English in favour of the Protestant rebels, Saint-Sulpice entreated Philip to declare war on Elizabeth I. The Spanish took the opposite approach, and desisted from making protest to the English court. Saint-Sulpice was informed that England had a legitimate right to Calais as per the terms of Cateau-Cambrésis by which it was to be held by the French for eight years. It was 'clear' force of arms was the only way England was going to recover control of the port. As such England's intervention was a political and not a religious matter. The duchessa di Parma who acted as regent for the Spanish Netherlands would however impede the taking of war loans by the English from Antwerpen.

Saint-Sulpice would also send around 11 official despatches to the lieutenant-general of France the king of Navarre between May and the latter's death in November 1562. Saint-Sulpice was unaware of the negotiations that had transpired for Philip to provide Navarre a kingdom in compensation for the loss of Navarre. He reported that the situation in the Spanish court was less tense after Navarre's death.

Chantonnay, the Spanish ambassador, held suspicions as to the religious orthodoxy of the French king's brother's tutor François de Carnavalet and feared that he might imbue his 'religious deviancy' in the teachings of the young prince. He reported to king Philip various 'horror stories' of evidence of Orléans profaning the host and other insults. Saint-Sulpice, at Carnavalet's request, assured the Spanish queen that the tutor would only instruct his charge in virtue and would not enter religious discussions with him.

In January 1563, Saint-Sulpice dispatched his secrétaire La-Mothe-Fénelon back to the French court to inform Catherine that Philip was attempting to obstruct the establishment of a peace deal to end the French civil war.

=== Peace of Amboise ===
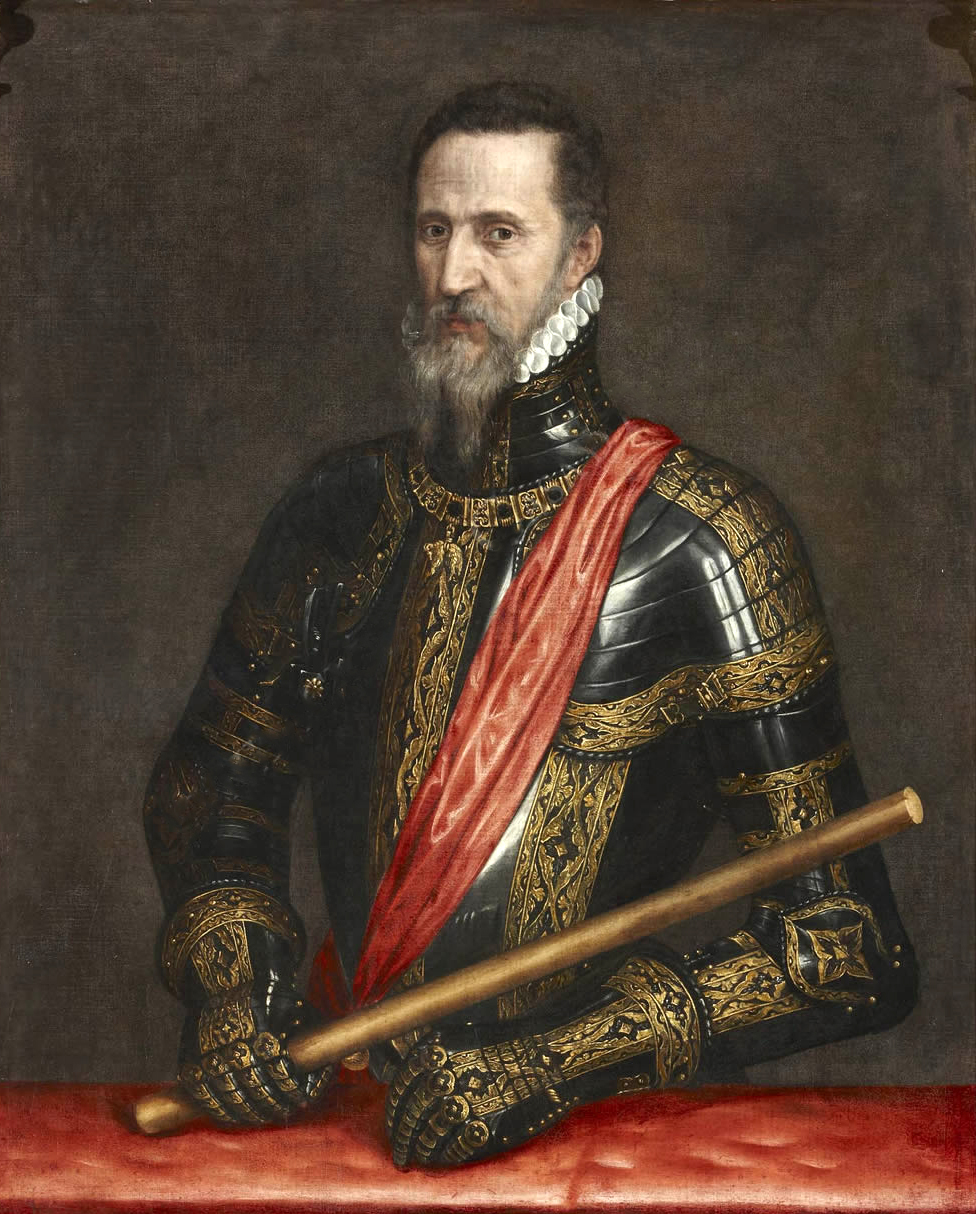
Duke of Alba one of the leading political advisers for Philip II

By the end of the first war of religion, Chantonnay had adopted a more discreet posture. Meanwhile, Saint-Sulpice took on a more bold attitude in Spain. The duke of Alba protested the concessions made to the Protestants in the peace, but was informed by Saint-Sulpice that Catherine had restored Catholic worship in the kingdom. He was unable to convince Alba, but appealed to Philip. There was some Spanish displeasure at the Edict of Amboise, but Philip was overall pleased to be extricated from a complicated diplomatic situation. He thus made no open declaration of his disapproval. Saint-Sulpice reported to Catherine that Philip had stated to him that he neither approved nor disapproved of the edict, as it was already a reality, thus there was no point dwelling on it any longer.

In May 1563, Saint-Sulpice affirmed with pride to Catherine that France was both the first and most important of Spain's allies. As a mark of the French gratitude for the Spanish support the kingdom had received during the civil war, Catherine informed the Spanish court French forces would be at Philip's disposal if so required. Saint-Sulpice thus took the initiative in July when informed by Alba that there were 'heretics and Anabaptists' in the Netherlands to propose French support in their suppression. He then wrote back to the French court to get retrospective approval for his offer. Charles affirmed Saint-Sulpice's decision and asked him to make it again with his approval.

There was some concern about the Spanish reaction to the recovery of Le Havre by force of arms from the English. This was due to the Spanish informing Saint-Sulpice that they saw legitimacy in Elizabeth's desire to be restored to Calais. However, by the time of the siege of the city, Catholic solidarity had brought Philip over to the French position. Thus after the city was taken on 28 July, Saint-Sulpice received Philip's congratulations.

Alba protested to Saint-Sulpice a little while later that the peace edict was enforced 'to the letter' for the Catholics, but not so for the Protestants. Saint-Sulpice and the French court reacted with irritation to the Spanish unease at the activities of the Protestant prince de Condé and return of the seigneur d'Andelot to his office of colonel-general of the infantry. Both parties argued that it was not correct for the Spanish crown to trouble itself so greatly with French domestic affairs.

=== Navaresse troubles ===
During September 1563, the Pope declared the queen of Navarre to be a heretic, and summoned her to appear before the inquisition. Saint-Sulpice was informed of this development by Catherine who characterised is an overstretching of the Papacies reach. Charles wrote indignantly to Saint-Sulpice that the Pope intended to usurp the French king's authority in the matter. For Charles the Pope's declaration of an inquisitorial visit was invalid and he made it clear to Saint-Sulpice that interventions in French territories from the Pope would not be tolerated. Saint-Sulpice was tasked with keeping his ear to the ground in Spain to understand any further developments in the situation. Philip did indeed hold plans related to Navarre, hoping to see the queen kidnapped and delivered to the Spanish inquisition. Monluc further envisioned Philip seizing control of Béarn from the queen of Navarre thereby uniting the destruction of Protestant power with the enlargement of the Spanish realm. At the end of November, Saint-Sulpice was informed of such a plot by the queen of Spain who had learned of it from one of embroiderers. Saint-Sulpice thanked both parties for their vigilance in Charles' name. Having informed Catherine of the plot she undertook energetically to the defence of Béarn. When an uprising against the queen of Navarre did begin in Oloron in December it was quickly suppressed. Some months later, Saint-Sulpice was tasked by the queen of Navarre with adapting the instructions she had given her new envoy to the Spanish court as he felt best to align with the king's affairs.

=== Dismissal of Chantonnay ===
During an audience with Philip in December 1563, Saint-Sulpice protested virulently against the activities of the Spanish ambassador in France. Chantonnay was accused of supporting the maintenance of arms in the capital. By this means he overstepped his role as a diplomat. In February 1564 Chantonnay was recalled from France.

Saint-Sulpice alleged that he enjoyed a close rapport at the Spanish court with the prince of Éboli who favoured more harmonious relations with the French crown. Éboli thus would have supported the campaign for Chantonnay's dismissal. Philip was not happy at the pillorying of his ambassador but turned to Álava as a replacement for the post. He was given instructions to take a softer tact, with an approach of gentleness as opposed to threatening the French crown. Philip confided in Saint-Sulpice that he did not believe Chantonnay had malicious intentions towards Catherine and was sad he had been unable to satisfy her.

In December 1563, Saint-Sulpice received an appeal from the bourgeois of the Breton town of Le Croisic that he secure from the Spanish king the release of two of their number who had been condemned by the Spanish inquisition for heresy and put to the galleys. Their cause had also been a matter of concern to the previous Spanish ambassador, who made the case to the Spanish crown for their release in April 1562.

As ambassador to Spain, Saint-Sulpice was entreated by the lieutenant-general of Guyenne Monluc that he see that Monluc's reputation was maintained well in the Spanish court. He assured the ambassador that his children would be thus obligated to Saint-Sulpice.

From 1563 Saint-Sulpice enjoyed membership of the royal conseil privé (privy council). In the text Discours merveilleux de la vie, actions et deportemens de Catherine de Médicis, the principal members of Catherine's government were outlined as follows: Saint-Sulpice; the lieutenant-general of Languedoc, Joyeuse; the lieutenant-general of Dauphiné, Maugiron; the governor of Narbonne, Fourquevaux; and the sécretaire d'État Villeroy.

As concerned a meeting between Catherine and the Spanish king, Saint-Sulpice warned Catherine in January that the more desperate for a meeting she appeared, the less keen Philip was on seeing it come to pass. Catherine took his advice and dramatically scaled back her expressed interest in the meeting.

Álava offered 'general reproaches' to the French pacification policy. In opposition to his criticisms, both Catherine and Saint-Sulpice championed her grand tour of the kingdom as the tonic to France's ills. Both figures emphasised that through the full implementation of the edict of Amboise France would be bettered.

=== Political crises ===
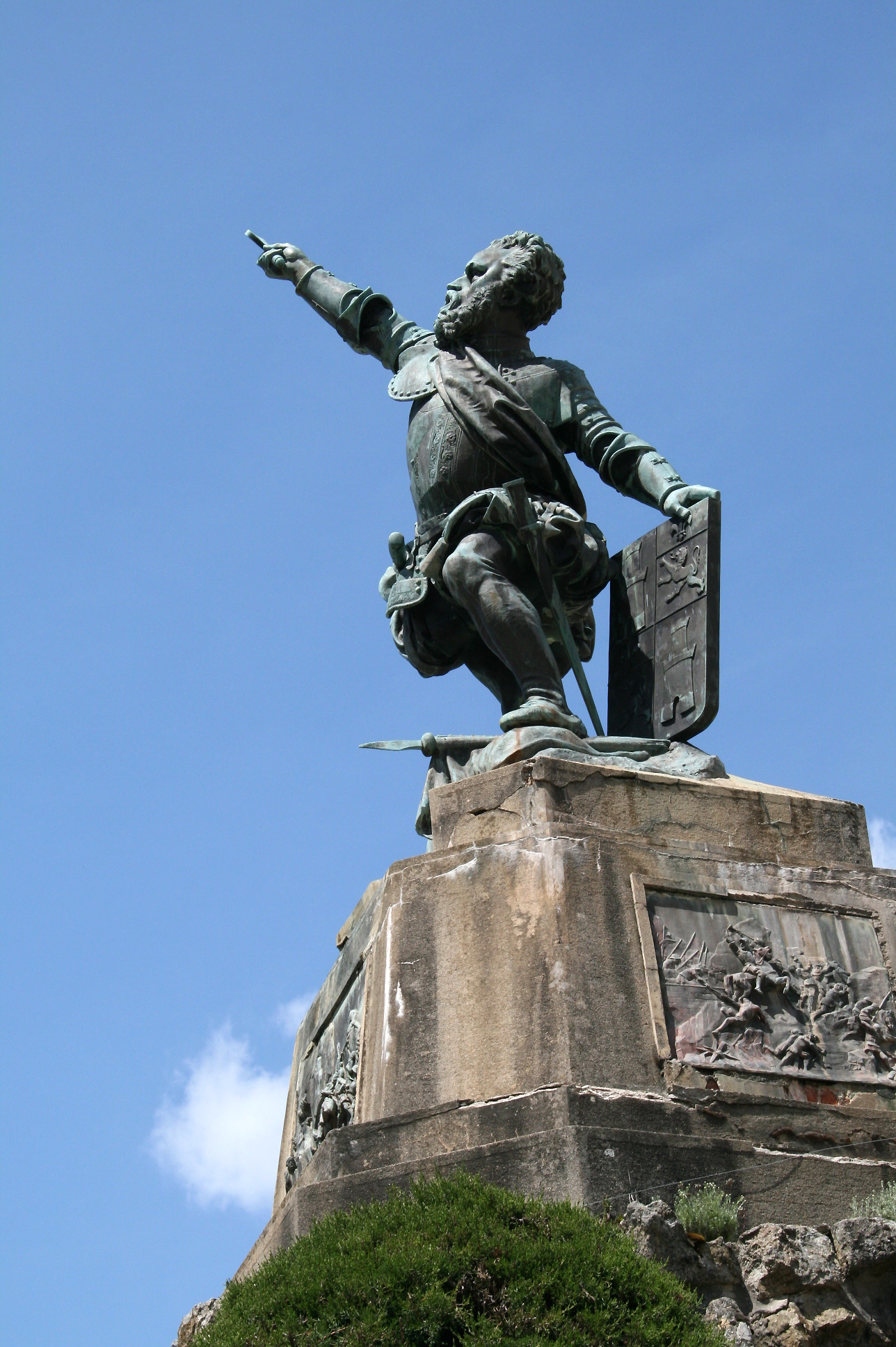
Sampiero Corso leader of the rebellion against Genoese control in Corsica

During May 1564, the Pope declared that the French king enjoyed precedence over the Spanish king in the Papal court. This was justified on the grounds of the Frankish conversion to Christianity and how ancient the kingdom was. There was debate as to how to respond to this insult in Spain and it was agreed not to make an official response. Philip would however recall his ambassador from Rome. Saint-Sulpice found the king's silence on the matter greatly troubling. Álava meanwhile observed the fear in the French court that despite the confirming of their privilege it was even more fragile than it had been before. As a result, Saint-Sulpice did not see fit to justify the Papal decision and the matter was left to rest. The ambassador opined back to the French court that the best approach to the situation was to take an approach of modesty. Catherine concurred.

Around this time there was a further potential crisis between the kingdoms over the Corsican revolt of Sampiero Corso. The Spanish insisted that the French demonstrate their neutrality and Saint-Sulpice communicated to the French court his opinion that Philip should be respected in this matter. Catherine assured the Spanish crown that French subjects were prohibited from aiding Corso. A few months later Saint-Sulpice admitted he feared the flashpoint could have caused a greater conflagration. Philip and Alba were greatly satisfied by the speed of the French appeasement, and rewarded Saint-Sulpice with information about the Spanish fleets movements.

In August 1564, Saint-Sulpice received induction into the most senior order of French chivalry when he was granted the collier (collar) of the Ordre de Saint-Michel (Order of Saint-Michel). That same year he was made a gentilhomme ordinaire de la chambre du roi (ordinary gentleman of the king's chamber). The king afforded him benefit for his role in Spain by ordering a six-month suspension in any litigation in France concerning him on the grounds that of his Spanish residence.

Saint-Sulpice endeavoured to gain an understanding of grand Spanish plans at sea in late 1564, but reported to the French court in June and August that he struggled to obtain clear answers from Philip. Philip's caginess derived from the French alliance with the Ottoman Empire and the French king's alliance with Corsican rebels.

=== Bayonne ===
When the French court reached Dauphiné during its royal tour, Catherine reminded the queen of Spain, her daughter of her desire for a meeting to come to pass between the sovereigns. This was a more unofficial channel of communication than through Saint-Sulpice. The ambassador had the topic of a meeting brought to him during an audience with the Spanish king and responded coldly. Thus in November it was left to the Spanish to make the move on planning the meeting.

In November 1564, Saint-Sulpice protested to the Spanish crown against the violation of the comté de Foix (county of Foix) by Spanish forces. The French crown's position was that the queen of Navarre's sovereignty over her lands was a different matter to her Protestantism. Saint-Sulpice also protested against the activities of the queen of Navarre's uncle the bishop of Comminges, asking Élisabeth to weigh upon her husband 'not to employ such shady characters'. The queen of Navarre for her part responded to his activities by charging her uncle with treason.

Competing French and Spanish expeditions were sent to Floride in early 1565. Each kingdom became aware of the other expedition and its objectives. The fraught colonial situation remained unaddressed for the majority of 1565 and Saint-Sulpice reported that there was official silence on the matter. The diplomatic storm would not break until November during the ambassadorship of Saint-Sulpice's successor.

From January to March 1565, the grand tour of the kingdom resided in Toulouse. Catherine was greatly desirous to hold an interview with Philip at this time for the purpose of arranging several royal marriages between the house of Valois and house of Habsburg. To this end Saint-Sulpice had numerous interviews with Philip exploring the possibility. The prospect of a meeting between Catherine and Philip had been broached to Saint-Sulpice as early as March 1562 when Toulouse was proposed as the location for such an undertaking. Saint-Sulpice communicated to the French court that Philip had indicated his willingness to undertake a meeting with her. Philip informed Saint-Sulpice that if he personally was unable to meet with Catherine then his wife, the queen of Spain and Catherine's daughter Élisabeth would be able to meet with her. In January 1565 he announced that it would be only his wife in attendance, thus it would take the form of a discreet family reunion as opposed to a grand meeting. Saint-Sulpice secured agreement that it would occur at Bayonne. Saint-Sulpice remained central to the negotiations for the meeting. Alongside Élisabeth, Philip would send the duke of Alba one of his closest advisors. Alba informed Saint-Sulpice in February that it was foolish to imagine that France could emerge from its current crisis and the evils that plagued the kingdom without Spanish support.

During March, Saint-Sulpice plead with the queen of Spain to intervene with her husband, to get him to modify his position as concerned the kingdom of Navarre. When it became apparent to Philip that his wife and Alba might end up meeting with the queen of Navarre and the prince de Condé at Bayonne, he made it clear to Saint-Sulpice that his wife did not wish to meet with rebels and the sources of sedition. Saint-Sulpice attempted to have the prohibition on attendance limited to the queen of Navarre, Condé, Coligny and the cardinal de Châtillon, however it was made clear to him no Protestants were acceptable. Saint-Sulpice thus advised Catherine that it would be wise to take this seriously. Catherine agreed to concede to this request, though tasked Saint-Sulpice with making a new appeal to Philip. The ambassador highlighted that the situations in France and Spain could not be equated and civil war was a great danger in France. He reported with great pleasure in April that all was proceeding well in Spain. It was only at this time that it was learned that Alba and the duke of Nájera would be in Élisabeth's retinue for the meeting. Saint-Sulpice had not been able to get any details about who was to accompany her from the French princess. In May Saint-Sulpice received a new tirade from Philip in which he stated that Élisabeth would be disowned by the Spanish population if he acceded to such a meeting involving Protestants. Even if his wife were almost outside Bayonne, 'she would return to Spain if the queen of Navarre or Condé were in Bayonne'.

According to Saint-Sulpice, it was key to emphasise to the Spanish queen Élisabeth that France was concerned with the preservation of Catholicism and the maintenance of peace. Élisabeth supported Philip strongly in the importance of the destruction of Protestantism, and wrote to her mother often on this point. Philip monitored the correspondence Élisabeth received from the French court.

Nevertheless, Saint-Sulpice was sensitive to the optics of the exclusion of Protestants from the meeting, and warned Catherine as such. Condé for his part made clear his displeasure at the state of affairs. Several weeks before the meeting Alba left Saint-Sulpice fearing that the Spanish intended to impose a new religious policy against the Protestants on the French king at the meeting. The meeting between Catherine, Alba and Élisabeth would transpire between 15 June and 2 July. On 27 July 1565 a post-Bayonne declaration would be issued. The declaration offered vague support in favour of Catholic unity, though Alba opined to Philip that as soon as the Protestants arrived at Bayonne, Catherine's position would reverse.

After the Bayonne Interview, Saint-Sulpice accompanied the Spanish queen Élisabeth back to Spain.

=== Royal marriage ===
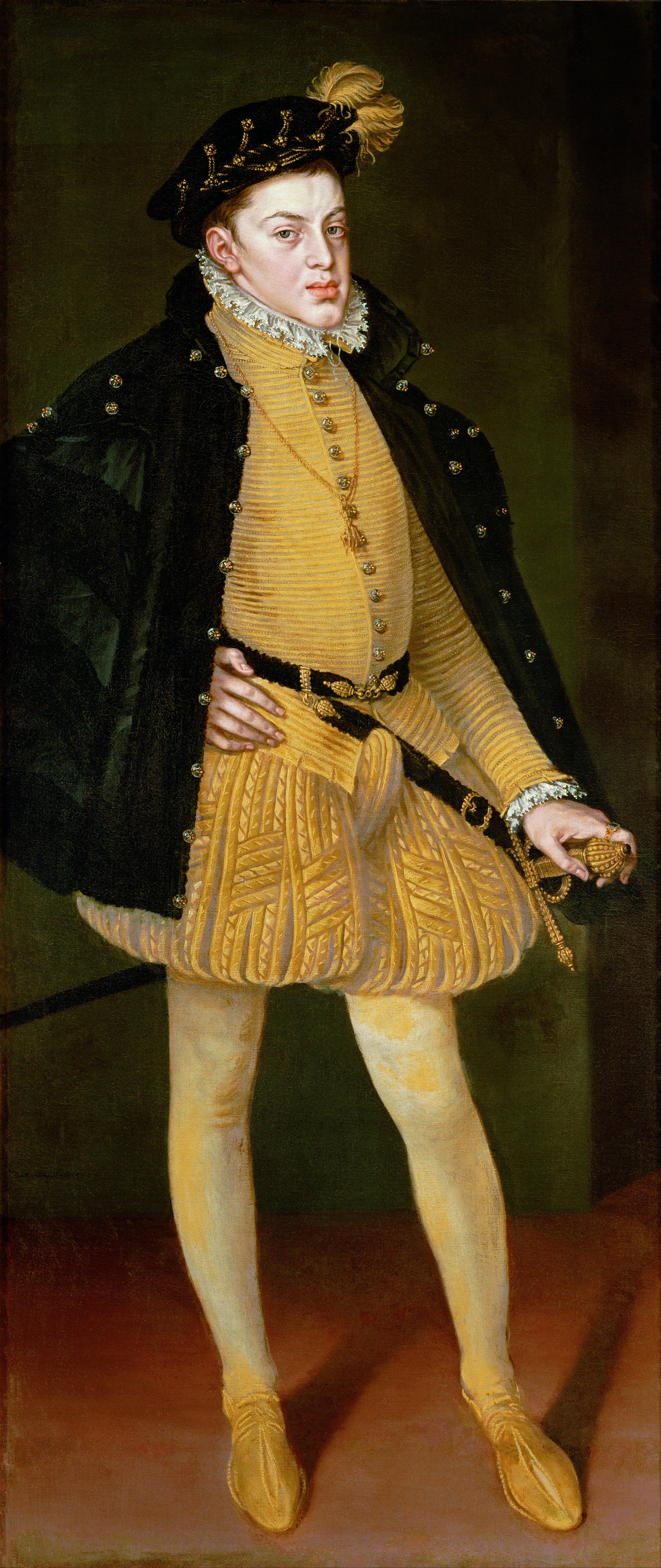
Don Carlos, son of Philip II

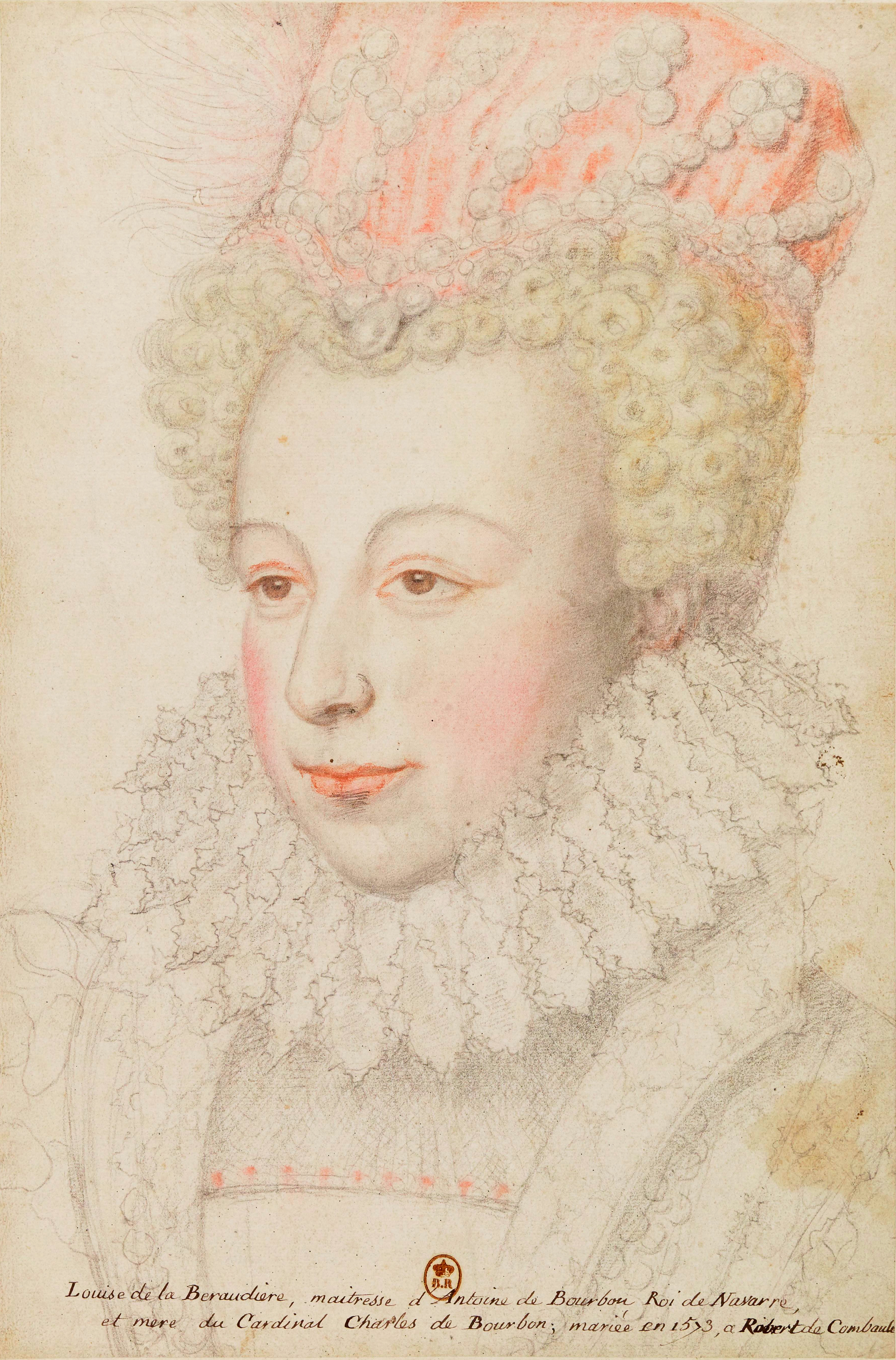
Marguerite, daughter of Catherine and sister of Charles

Back in Spain, Saint-Sulpice was faced with difference of opinion between the French and Spanish crowns over the matter of princely marriages and a league against the Ottoman Empire. Saint-Sulpice attempted to get a firm commitment from Philip but struggled in this regard. In the Spanish court, only Éboli was truly favourable to Catherine's proposal for a marriage between Marguerite de Valois and the son of Philip. For Éboli the union was a perfect way to preserve the peace between the kingdoms. The prince dismissed Alba's coldness, highlighting that the Bayonne conference would have gone differently had he been involved. Alba made his disapproval of the project known to Saint-Sulpice. In September, Philip responded to Saint-Sulpice through Alba. The ambassador was informed that Philip's son was to be wed to Anna of Austria, daughter of the Emperor. As concerned an anti-Ottoman league, it could disquiet the German princes.

Saint-Sulpice's time as an ordinary ambassador to Spain came to an end in October 1565 when he was relieved in favour of the baron de Fourquevaux.

During his tenure in Spain, Saint-Sulpice was rarely paid his wages or expenses. As such when he returned to France at the end of his term he was rewarded with several ecclesiastical benefices. His brother Christophe refused to receive the bishopric of Riez, content with his responsibilities for Marcilhac. His half brother would refuse the bishopric and an abbey, not wishing to enter a church life. Saint-Sulpice thus traded the bishopric of Riez for the abbey of Belleperche.

Arriving in Quercy on his return, Saint-Sulpice was greeted by many of the seigneurs of the region keen to offer their services to him.

=== Man of the court ===
From 1565, Saint-Sulpice would serve as one of the chambellan (chamberlain) of king Charles.

Increasingly devoted to affairs at the French court, Saint-Sulpice was unable to provide his attentions to his lands in the south of France. The baron had the ambition to insert several of his sons into the entourage of a royal prince, in particular the duc d'Alençon.

Saint-Sulpice received assurances of the great friendship in which he was held by the cardinal de Châtillon. However at the same time as Châtillon was assuring him of this he was attempting to frustrate the families acquisition of the bishopric of Beauvais.

In August 1566, Saint-Sulpice was back in Spain, though this time as an extraordinary ambassador as opposed to an ordinary one.

Saint-Sulpice still participated in military service, even during the 1560s and saw combat during the first months of the second war of religion at the royalist victory of the battle of Saint-Denis in November 1567 where he was wounded and his former protector constable Montmorency killed.

At this time Saint-Sulpice enjoyed a poor relationship with the young vicomte de Turenne (viscount of Turenne). Hoping to discredit Turenne, Saint-Sulpice insinuated to Catherine that Turenne was facilitating covert contact between her young son Alençon and the house of Montmorency. Such contact was seen as a threat by Catherine as it afforded Alençon a factional political role.

During 1568 Saint-Sulpice was made capitaine de cinquante hommes d'armes (captain of 50 men at arms) by the king.

=== Third war of religion ===
Due to Saint-Sulpice's absence, his wife negotiated an agreement with the Protestant commander the baron d'Assier in October 1568 protecting the Saint-Sulpice's seigneuries from attack or occupation by Assier's men. She further negotiated with the royalist commander Monluc to secure an agreement akin to that which had been granted to the comté de Comminges. When the main Protestant army under Admiral Coligny passed through the area of the family domains, she gifted the admiral several animals, causing Coligny to note that he considered himself a friend of Saint-Sulpice, and would not trouble the Saint-Sulpice territories.

The following year he wrote to his wife in October urging her to 'sell off all the wheat'. During the summer of 1569, Saint-Sulpice's sister Madeleine and his brother Marcilhac wrote to François de Gontaut, one of Saint-Sulpice's brother-in-laws and a captain under the command of Coligny. They bemoaned the fact that those seigneurs on the borders of Saint-Sulpice's lands were subjecting his peasants to unbearable extortions and cruelties. After making this appeal they would next turn to another Protestant commander the comte de Montgommery, but he had other priorities than heeding their request.

=== Alençon's governor ===
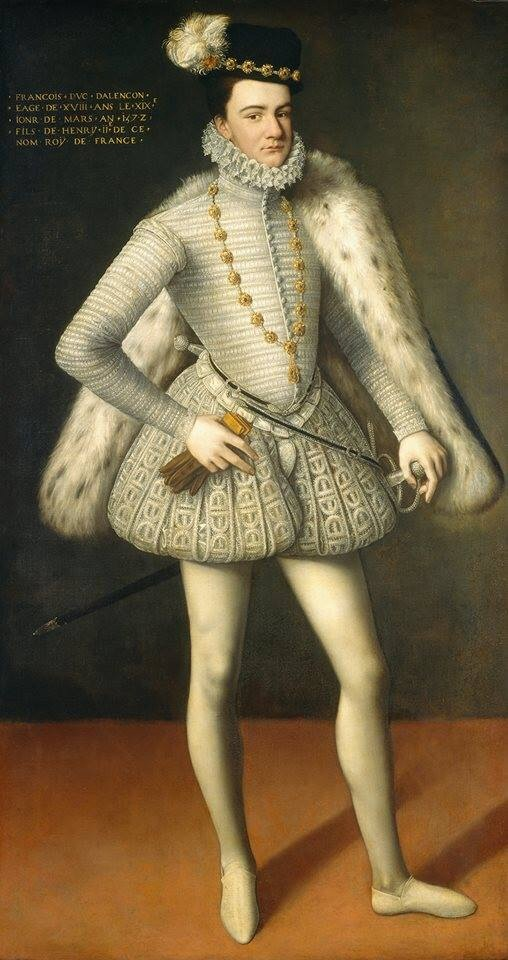
Duc d'Alençon, Charles' youngest brother who would be ward of Saint-Sulpice from 1569 to 1576

In October 1569, the surintendant de la maison (superintendent of the household) of the king's brother the duc d'Alençon Jean Babou died. He was succeeded in this charge by Saint-Sulpice. In addition to this role he was made the governor of the duc and the head of his council. Thus he managed Alençon's property, and as governor presided over a body of 15 people at Alençon's expense.

Just as Babou had sought to fill the ducs household with his relatives, Saint-Sulpice did likewise. His four sons were beneficiaries of his new position, as was his brother in law. His half brother was inserted into the household as a gentleman servant, while Henri and Bertrand became chambellan and gentilhomme de la chambre for the duc. It would be while in Alençon's household, that Henri and Bertrand gained their education in riding, fencing and music. In return for the 'noble education' they would entertain Alençon. Combining the value of Saint-Sulpice's pension with the salaries of his relatives in the household they drew a sum of 6,700 livres a year from the prince.

In addition to his own relatives, Saint-Sulpice was also able to secure promise of favour from the duc de Longueville in return for installing a client of his named La Baratte into Alençon's household as a valet.

Though Saint-Sulpice had not sought out the office he gained in Alençon's household prior to his appointment, he quickly struck it off with the young prince, a friendship developing between the two.

Alençon was brought down with a case of smallpox in October 1569. While it was uncomfortable for the prince, his condition was never critical. By mid November, Saint-Sulpice was able to report to Catherine that Alençon was now able to walk without a cane and was continually improving.

Overseeing Alençon's education, he highlighted as a model for the prince his elder brother the duc d'Anjou. This inspired a bitter jealousy in Alençon of Anjou, who knew Catherine preferred her elder son.

Representing Catherine's positions with the young prince, Saint-Sulpice exerted his efforts to dissuade Alençon from following the advice of those who wished for him to leave the court. He urged Alençon demonstrate obedience to Catherine. In 1570 he was denounced to Catherine due to the behaviours of Alençon but he protested to the queen against the 'slander'.

Saint-Sulpice would largely stay with the young prince at court from 1569 to 1572. Alençon indulged in hunting, sports and persistent womanising. His reputation for the latter activity forced Saint-Sulpice to reassure Catherine in mid April that his ward had been conducting himself in a proper manner, and that since Lent the only women he had been in contact with were the duchesse de Nevers (duchess of Nevers), duchesse de Nemours and the duchesse de Montmorency. Alençon had neither seen nor spoken to any other women according to Saint-Sulpice.

At Alençon's request, Saint-Sulpice was made governor of the princes appanage in January 1570.

=== Edict of Saint-Germain-en-Laye ===
Saint-Sulpice was among the grand lords assembled to hear the articles of peace that had been negotiated by the king to bring the third war of religion to a close in August 1570. After the terms were read, Charles admitted he had failed to bring about victory by force of arms necessitating this course. The king's two brothers, Anjou and Alençon then swore to uphold the terms, they were followed by the other lords present, Saint-Sulpice included.

In January 1572 a company of thirty lances was created for Saint-Sulpice. He established his half-sister's husband René de Pins-Montbrun as the lieutenant of the company. The following year Montbrun would be made a chevalier of the ordre de Saint-Michel thanks to Saint-Sulpice's influence. Meanwhile, the guidon of the company was Saint-Sulpice's eldest son Henri.

A marriage was to be established between the young Protestant king of Navarre and the king's sister Marguerite as a term of the 1570 peace. Keen to see this marriage brought to pass the queen of Navarre departed her court to finalise negotiations with Catherine in January 1572. In opposition to the marriage, cardinale Alexandrini (cardinal Alexandrini) moved to reach the French court first. Saint-Sulpice was assigned as the cardinale's escort, and kept him waiting for six days in Bayonne. Alexandrini would however abandon his train and race to court, and the queen of Navarre was forced to wait outside Blois until the cardinale had departed. Alexandrini was unable to stop the marriage however, and agreement between the queen of Navarre and Catherine was reached on 4 April.

=== Fourth French War of Religion ===
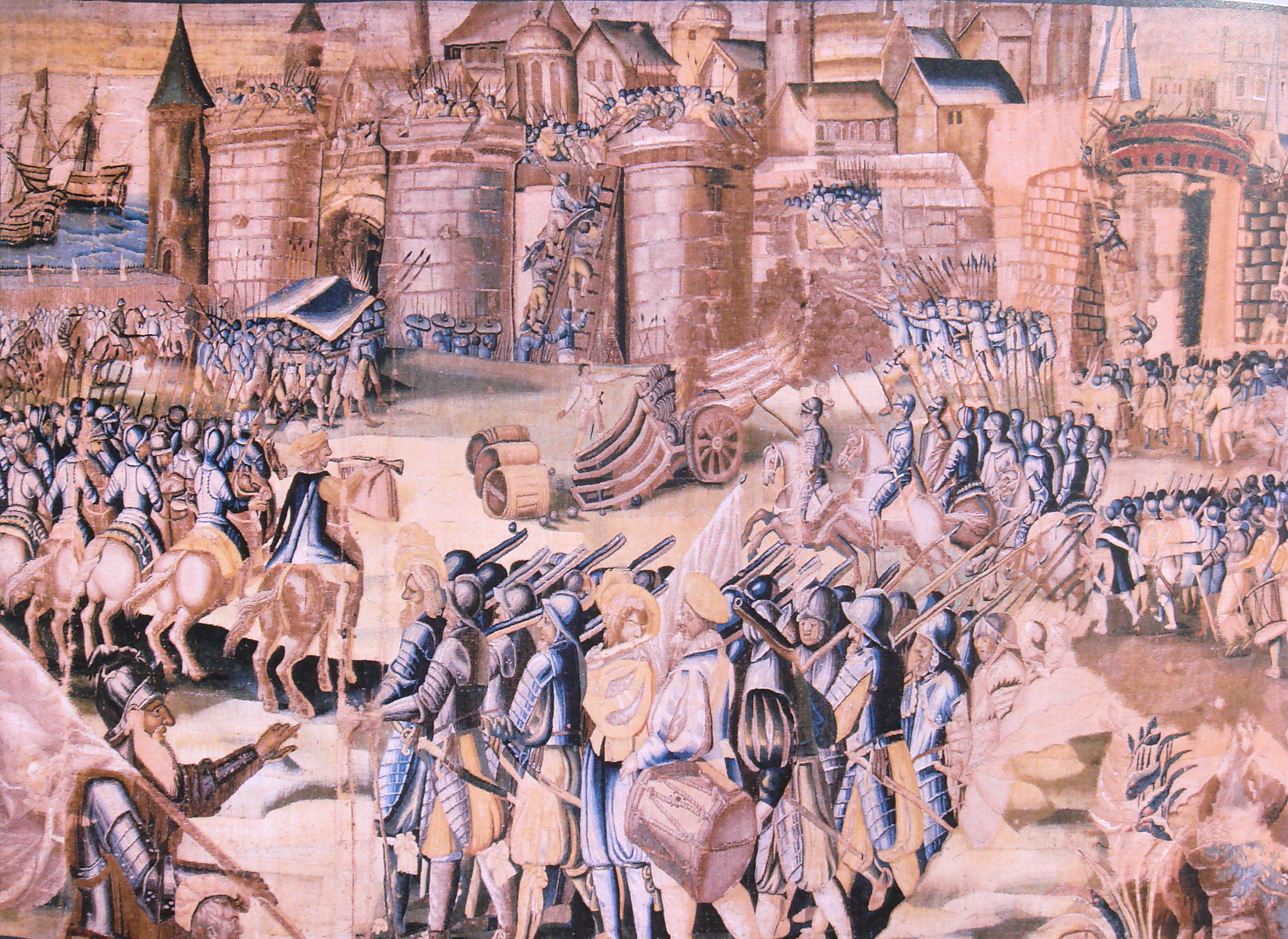
Conduct of the siege of La Rochelle by the royal army

The reduction of Protestant held La Rochelle in 1573 involved many great nobles, among them the king's two surviving brothers the duc d'Anjou (who led the siege) and the duc d'Alençon; the duc d'Aumale and young duc de Guise, the king of Navarre and the prince de Condé. Saint-Sulpice was responsible for the security of Alençon and opined with disapproval that the siege trenches were no places for the son of a king. In the hopes of easing the princes situation Saint-Sulpice made a request of his wife to send asparagus to the army as it was a favourite food of the prince, and he hoped it would make him better able to tolerate the rigours of war. Alençon, like many of the other young lords on the siege line, furthered the risks of being involved in the siege through acts of bravado and glory seeking. Saint-Sulpice wrote with considerable excitement to his wife during the progress of the siege as to his contact with the duc d'Anjou 'Monsieur [Anjou] does me much honour and speaks to me privately more than I could have hoped or thought for... be assured that I do not forget my friends during these moments'. For Anjou there was benefit in opening this line of contact due to Saint-Sulpice's role in Alençon's household. Through such 'friendly chats' he could gain intel on what Alençon was getting up to. Saint-Sulpice also expressed pride at the involvement of two of his sons in the siege. Nevertheless, conscious of the dangers of the siege, he advised against his eldest son, Henri joining the besieging army. He noted that his son the seigneur de Comiac had taken an arquebus shot to the leg, and that this was surely proof of the honour he was gaining. He assured his wife the shot had missed the bone and was not dangerous. However, Comiac's wound became infected, and he died. Saint-Sulpice held onto the fact that his sons brave death had created a glorious reputation which would continue beyond his life. He wrote to his wife on 22 April that they were both filled with regret that god had seen fit to take Comiac from them. Nevertheless, he was pleased with the grace god had granted them by giving Comiac such a positive reputation that he would be sorely missed for a long time. Comiac was just one of many noble deaths during the siege, with 66 of the 155 most senior officers involved in the operation dying during its course.

In August 1573 Saint-Sulpice secured the lands of a bastard noble of Quercy who had disappeared.

His son Henri defected from the household of Saint-Sulpice's ward Alençon to join that of Anjou after his election as king of the Rzeczpospolita Obojga Narodów (Polish-Lithuanian Commonwealth), joining the French prince in his new kingdom. Anjou would reign in the Commonwealth from January to June 1574. During his stay in the Commonwealth, Saint-Sulpice's son came to be under the protection of the comte de Retz. Retz thus wrote to Saint-Sulpice to assure him of his son's good health. Retz further flattered Saint-Sulpice through praise of his son. When Retz returned to France in March due to word arriving with Anjou of the plot of La Molle and Annibal de Coconas, Henri Ébrard returned with him. With Anjou's return to France a few months later, now styled as king Henri III, he adopted Henri Ébrard as one of his favourites.

=== Fifth war of religion ===
In early 1574, Saint-Sulpice retired to his estates. Saint-Sulpice would not join the duc d'Alençon in his rebellion despite being his surintendant. He sent admonitions to the young prince for his plotting from his estates. The baron was briefed by the king in mid January that there existed in Poitou and Saintonge evildoers who were bringing both the Catholic and Protestant nobility into opposition to the crown in the name of the 'common good'. Thus briefed, Saint-Sulpice proved critical in preventing an alliance between the 'gentleman of La Rochelle, Poitou and Saintonge' with the rebellious Protestants of Languedoc who were entering a state of rebellion in January 1574.

On 2 April, Saint-Sulpice and Villeroy were tasked with rendezvousing with the governor of Languedoc the baron de Damville. They were to negotiate with him in the hopes of fragmenting the Protestant-malcontent coalition. The two men were provided with secret instructions of the concessions they would be permitted to make in any negotiations if necessary. If their negotiations were not successful, they were to invite Damville and a Protestant deputation to court. Having arrived at Avignon, the ambassadors were informed Damville would not see them. At this time they learned that the king had arrested Damville's brother the duc de Montmorency. Alongside receipt of this information they received new instructions from Catherine to see to Damville's arrest. They were to transmit this to the lieutenant-general of Languedoc, Joyeuse and Fourquevaux. Neither envoy could understand such instructions, being unarmed in the province of which Damville was governor it would be significantly easier for Damville to arrest them. The two men passed three weeks in the province, issuing instructions relieving the people and leaders of the province from their loyalty to Damville, before returning to the royal court, where they learned Charles was dead. Damville entered rebellion and attempted to seize Narbonne.

== Reign of Henri III ==
At the start of the king's reign, on 10 September 1574, a new regulation was issued as concerned court protocol. When the king entered his cabinet for the day the following men were to remain present in the chamber: princes, officers related to the affairs at hand, the four sécretaires d'État, the bishops of Orléans, Limoges and Valence, the future archbishop of Toulouse, Bellièvre, Pibrac, and Saint-Sulpice, alongside a couple of others.

=== Alençon's rebellion ===
In September 1575 Saint-Sulpice was back at court with Alençon. He was caught off guard by Alençon's flight from court on 15 September to join with the rebels. Henri was furious and exploded in anger. Saint-Sulpice, who was sleeping in Alençon's chambers, broke down crying when he learned of what had transpired. Alençon established himself in Dreux and issued a manifesto.

Saint-Sulpice bemoaned to Henri that with his charge Alençon's fall into rebellion he had lost not only his offices but his honour. He thus asked Henri to compensate him for his losses and thereby demonstrate the 'pride and esteem' in which he was held. As a result, his pension was increased by 1,000 livres and a 2,000 livres pension was established for his son. This addressed his material losses.

In the winter of 1575, Saint-Sulpice was sent as an extraordinary ambassador to the duc de Lorraine alongside the royal favourite Villequier.

With the triumph of Alençon in the fifth war of religion he was made duc d'Anjou, Touraine and Berry. His income expanded dramatically and with it his household. In August 1576 it contained 942 officers among whom there were 111 chambellans (chamberlains) and 157 gentilhommes de la chambre. Around this time in August 1576, Saint-Sulpice lost his position as surintendant de la maison and was replaced by the comte de Saint-Aignan. Soon after Saint-Sulpice's departure, he was followed by the relatives he had installed in the household.

The count palatine of Zweibrücken demanded a great amount of money from the French crown to compensate him for his campaign into France during the Third War of Religion. The French crown was forced to resort to various financiers to raise the sum with the threat of another invasion if his terms were not granted. As a part of the agreement Saint-Sulpice was to hand over one of his children to Zweibrücken, however he was ill inclined for this to come to pass. He, and another of the hostages fathers proposed instead that their children stay with the duc de Lorraine so that they would not have to go into Protestant territory. Greatly aggrieved by these refusals, Zweibrücken had the French diplomats who were with him arrested in August and made them bare witness to his triumphant entry into Heidelberg, accompanied by all the money and jewels he had already received from France.

=== Peace of Beaulieu ===
Having held a meeting with the king of Navarre, Saint-Sulpice returned to his estates in September 1576. In Quercy Catholic and Protestant gentleman, alongside the consuls of towns came to him. Saint-Sulpice made the king's desire for peace clear to them all. He was proposed by some of the gentleman as a delegate for the upcoming Estates General that was due to convene as a term of the peace. Saint-Sulpice declined the offer, arguing that it was not right for a conseiller d'État to be a delegate in the Estates.

Though not in Henri's council during its first incarnation at Lyon in September 1574 when the ratification of the handover of the remaining French territories in Piedmont was undertaken. Saint-Sulpice would be a conseiller d'État by December 1576.

Hoping to see Saint-Sulpice's son confirmed in his position as bishop of Cahors, the gentleman of Quercy wrote to the Papal Nuncio describing Saint-Sulpice in effusive terms as one of the most illustrious baronial families in France.

Henri delivered the opening address before the Estates General on 5 December 1576. Saint-Sulpice was overflowing in praise for the 'eloquence and grace' of the address, which in his estimation left all who heard it stunned. Even Henri's firmest critics were supposedly impressed.

Saint-Sulpice's son Henri, who was very close to the king Henri refused to return to the king's brothers' service. He arrived back at court alongside Saint-Sulpice to a warm greeting from the king on 3 December, the latter spoiling them both with fine foods. Alençon entreated the young Henri to return to his service though Saint-Sulpice's son declined. Saint-Sulpice meanwhile, sensing the toxic atmosphere between the royal brothers took the opportunity to draw up his will. Henri Ébrard got into a dispute with a member of Alençon's entourage (the vicomte de Tours) after insulting him during a game of pall mall. Subsequently, he was ambushed and assassinated by a group of men on 20 December 1576. Saint-Sulpice explained to the marquis de Villars that his son and Tours were reconciled by Aumale, yet only a few hours later Henri was stabbed to death. The assassin would escape royal punishment despite Saint-Sulpice's campaigning. Saint-Sulpice granted 20,000 livres to the widowed comtesse de Nègrepelisse and a further 10,000 livres in jewellery. These expenses put great strain on his finances. The king for his part, gifted Saint-Sulpice 15,000 livres to express his sympathy at the events.

Soon after the assassination, Saint-Sulpice departed the court with the body of his son. Absent from the court he received a letter from the sécretaire d'État Villeroy offering his condolences and frustration at the violence of court, something Villeroy saw as a consequence of the civil wars. The seigneur de Lanssac likewise expressed his sympathies to Saint-Sulpice, and informed him that the mastermind of the killing, the vicomte de Tours, had been executed in absentia. On 5 June an effigy was decapitated at Tours. Henri would intervene in 1579 to see the vicomte was punished while he was detained in the Papal territory of Avignon for an unrelated crime.

Saint-Sulpice looked for payments from the court to assist his financial circumstances, however despite grants from Henri these grants remained unfulfilled.

=== Peace of Bergerac ===
In April 1577, Henri sought to begin negotiations to bring about the end of the sixth war of religion. To this end he made a careful selection of southern French lords with diplomatic and political experience to negotiate a new peace. Among those selected for this responsibility were Saint-Sulpice who in addition to being a southern lord had experience as ambassador to Spain, the baron de Biron, the bishop of Valence, the sieur d'Escars from the Limousin, the seigneur de La Mothe-Fénelon former ambassador to England from the Périgord and the prince du sang duc de Montpensier. In part the involvement of La Mothe-Fénelon and Saint-Sulpice was a recognition of their respective roles as external ambassadors. This delegation arrived in Bergerac for negotiations on 25 April. Negotiations continued in the city until 24 June, when they were broken off by the Protestants who found the abrogation of the Edict of Beaulieu in favour of a new edict unacceptable. The sécretaire d'État Villeroy would then be dispatched in September with new instructions, and a treaty was negotiated successfully with the Protestant rebels to bring the war to a close. According to Jules Gassot, Villeroy outshone all the other men involved in the negotiation. The edict of pacification was thus signed at Bergerac on 14 September. Henri was delighted by the new peace, and opined to Saint-Sulpice that it would restore the kingdom to good health.

Henri wrote to Saint-Sulpice in November praising him for his role in bringing about the coming of peace. Henri asked whether Saint-Sulpice would be willing to assist in the enforcement of the peace in Guyenne alongside his brother-in-law marshal de Biron.

On 11 May 1578, shortly after the killing at court of the comte de Caylus, another favourite of Henri's, Saint-Sulpice wrote of his regret on hearing the news to his mother the comtesse de Caylus. It had only been two years prior that Saint-Sulpice's son had been killed at court. Having been informed of it prior, it was only when Saint-Sulpice confirmed the news to her that she believed it. La Mothe-Fénelon wrote to Saint-Sulpice hoping he could provide clarification on what exactly had transpired.

=== Treaty of Nérac ===
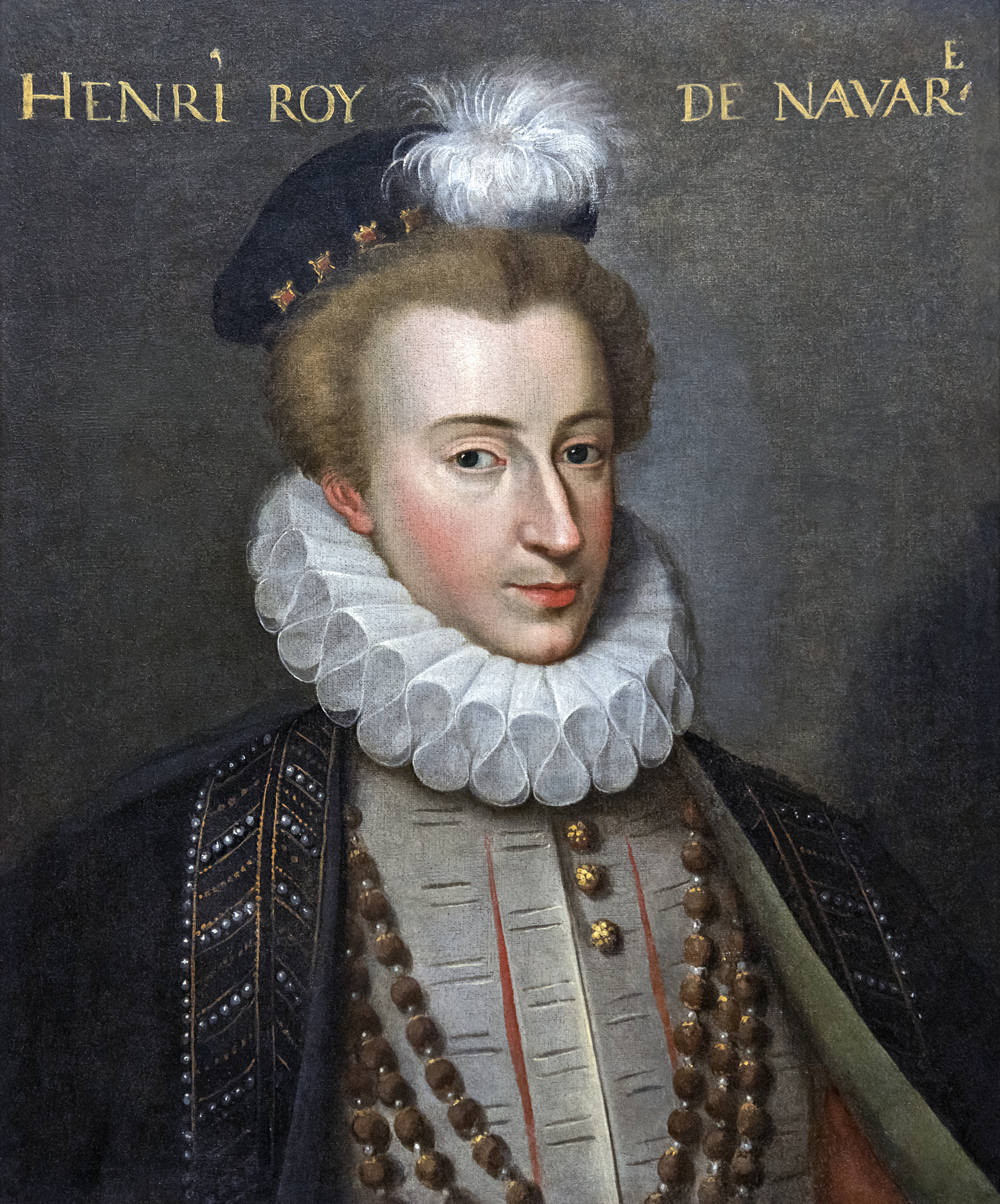
King of Navarre and one of the leaders of the Protestant rebels

Saint-Sulpice was alongside Catherine and the other members of Catherine's 'political entourage' at the Château d'Ollainville for the elaborate departure of Marguerite de Valois to join with her husband the king of Navarre on 2 August 1578. This 'political entourage' was composed of men of considerable skill, who in Knecht's estimation were some of the king's 'ablest advisors'. Alongside Saint-Sulpice in this group were the secrétaire d'État Pinart, Paul de Foix who would go on to be archbishop of Toulouse, the bishop of Valence and the seigneur de Pibrac. Beyond these political allies of Catherine were the Catholic Bourbon princes, whom Catherine hoped would intimidate their cousin the Protestant king of Navarre.

Catherine and her team of political advisors then departed themselves from Ollainville on Henri's instruction to conduct a mission of pacification in the troubled southern provinces. Saint-Sulpice participated in the mission despite his bitter feelings. The party reached Bordeaux on 18 September where Catherine endeavoured to dissolve a Catholic brotherhood that had formed in the city. The missions attention then turned to convincing Navarre and the Protestants of the crowns peaceable intentions towards them. The group spent the next five months working to overcome the hesitancy of the Protestants to withdraw from the 200 or so places that they had failed to depart with the coming of peace.

During negotiations Saint-Sulpice, Pibrac, Foix and the cardinal de Bourbon rejected the 36 article cahiers grievances submitted by the Protestant church of Languedoc on the grounds most of the demands were contrary to the previous peace edict. Catherine meanwhile succeeded in getting Navarre to back down from the maximalist Protestant position. On 28 February 1579 an accord was reached with the Protestants by which the reformers would receive nineteen places of surety for a period of six months. Freedom of religion would not be established across the kingdom as had initially been demanded by the Protestants.

Commissioners were established for the enforcement of the treaty of Nérac. For Guyenne there would be Guichard de Scorbiac and the vicomte de Gourdon for the Protestants, and Saint-Sulpice and Jean de Vezins the sénéchal of Quercy for the Catholics.

As a reward for his participation in the pacification efforts, Henri included him in the second induction (1579) of his new most senior chivalric order of France. Thus Saint-Sulpice became a chevalier (knight) of the Ordre du Saint-Esprit (Order of the Saint-Esprit). In the same induction as Saint-Sulpice came several princes du sang, as well as various members of Catherine's circle: the seigneur de Lanssac, marshal de Matignon, and Saint-Sulpice's cousin La Mothe-Fénelon.

=== Illness and death ===
In 1580, during the seventh war of religion, the rebel Protestants seized and sacked Cahors. This blow so proximate to Saint-Sulpice's landed interests came as a great blow to the baron.

In March 1581 Saint-Sulpice was employed by Catherine as a negotiator again, alongside La Mothe-Fénelon, Bellièvre and her chancellor Roissy.

In early 1581 Saint-Sulpice retired from his role at court despite having been made a conseiller d'État for a second time. He justified his absence on the grounds of his health troubles. He wrote up a new will in which his son Bertrand was established as his sole heir on condition Bertrand provide a dowry to his sister. He died on 5 November 1581.

Saint-Sulpice was survived by his wife, who was supported in the management of her financial affairs by Saint-Sulpice's friends. She was owed 55,000 livres by king Henri but he was unable to pay. As such Henri instead confirmed Bertrand as commander of his fathers hommes d'armes (men-at-arms) and the pension Saint-Sulpice had enjoyed of 4,000 livres.

== Sources ==
- Babelon, Jean-Pierre (2009). Henri IV. Fayard.
- Boucher, Jacqueline (1992). "Autour de François, Duc d'Alençon et d'Anjou, un Parti d'Opposition à Charles IX et Henri III". In Sauzet, Robert (ed.). Henri III et Son Temps. Librairie Philosophique J. Vrin.
- Boucher, Jacqueline (1998). "Saint-Sulpice". In Jouanna, Arlette; Boucher, Jacqueline; Biloghi, Dominique; Le Thiec, Guy (eds.). Histoire et Dictionnaire des Guerres de Religion.
- Carpi, Olivia (2012). Les Guerres de Religion (1559-1598): Un Conflit Franco-Français. Ellipses.
- Chevallier, Pierre (1985). Henri III: Roi Shakespearien. Fayard.
- Cloulas, Ivan (1979). Catherine de Médicis. Fayard.
- Durot, Éric (2012). François de Lorraine, duc de Guise entre Dieu et le Roi. Classiques Garnier.
- Ferrer-Bartomeu, Jérémie (2022). L'État à la Lettre: Écrit Politique et Société Administrative en France au Temps des Guerres de Religion (vers 1560 - vers 1620). Champ Vallon.
- Gellard, Matthieu (2014). Une Reine Épistolaire: Lettres et Pouvoir au Temps de Catherine de Médicis. Classiques Garnier.
- Gould, Kevin (2016). Catholic Activism in South-West France 1540-1570. Routledge.
- Haan, Bertrand (2011). L'Amitié Entre Princes: Une Alliance Franco-Espagnole au Temps des Guerres de Religion (1560-1570). Presses Universitaires de France.
- Holt, Mack (2002). The Duke of Anjou and the Politique Struggle During the Wars of Religion. Cambridge University Press.
- Jouanna, Arlette (1989). Le Devoir de révolte: La noblesse française et la gestation de l'Etat moderne 1559-1661. Fayard.
- Jouanna, Arlette (1998b). "Le Temps des Guerres de Religion en France (1559-1598)". In Jouanna, Arlette; Boucher, Jacqueline; Biloghi, Dominique; Le Thiec, Guy (eds.). Histoire et Dictionnaire des Guerres de Religion.
- Jouanna, Arlette; Le Thiec, Guy; Biloghi, Dominique (1998). "Index des Noms de Personnes". In Jouanna, Arlette; Boucher, Jacqueline; Biloghi, Dominique; Le Thiec, Guy (eds.). Histoire et Dictionnaire des Guerres de Religion.
- Jouanna, Arlette (2015). The St Bartholomew's Day Massacre: The Mysteries of a Crime of State. Translated by Bergin, Joseph. Manchester University Press.
- Jouanna, Arlette (2021). La France du XVIe Siècle 1483-1598. Presses Universitaires de France.
- Knecht, Robert (2008). The French Renaissance Court. Yale University Press.
- Knecht, Robert (2014). Catherine de' Medici. Routledge.
- Knecht, Robert (2016). Hero or Tyrant? Henry III, King of France, 1574-1589. Routledge.
- Le Roux, Nicolas (2000). La Faveur du Roi: Mignons et Courtisans au Temps des Derniers Valois. Champ Vallon.
- Le Roux, Nicolas (2020). Portraits d'un Royaume: Henri III, la Noblesse et la Ligue. Passés Composés.
- Marchand, Romain (2020). Henri de La Tour (1555-1623): Affirmation Politique, Service du Roi et Révolte. Classiques Garnier.
- Pernot, Michel (2013). Henri III: Le Roi Décrié. Éditions de Fallois.
- Potter, David (1995). A History of France 1460-1560: The Emergence of a Nation State. Macmillan.
- Potter, David (1997). The French Wars of Religion: Selected Documents. Palgrave Macmillan.
- Rivault, Antoine (2023). Le Duc d'Étampes et la Bretagne: Le Métier de gouverneur de Province à la Renaissance (1543-1565). Presses Universitaires de Rennes.
- Roelker, Nancy (1968). Queen of Navarre: Jeanne d'Albret 1528-1572. Harvard University Press.
- Romier, Lucien (1913). Les Origines Politiques des Guerres de Religion II: La Fin de la Magnificence Extérieure, le Roi contre les Protestants (1555-1559). Librairie Académique Perrin et Cie.
- Salmon, J.H.M. (1979). Society in Crisis: France in the Sixteenth Century. Metheun & Co.
- Solnon, Jean-François (2001). Henri III: un désir de majesté. Librarie Académique Perrin.
- Souriac, Pierre-Jean (2008). Une Guerre Civile: Affrontements Religieux et Militaires dans Le Midi Toulousain (1562-1596). Champ Vallon.
- Sutherland, Nicola (1962). The French Secretaries of State in the Age of Catherine de Medici. The Athlone Press.
- Sutherland, Nicola (1980). The Huguenot Struggle for Recognition. Yale University Press.
- Thompson, James (1909). The Wars of Religion in France 1559-1576: The Huguenots, Catherine de Medici and Philip II. Chicago University Press.
