= Jean-François de Bourgoing =

French diplomat, writer and translator

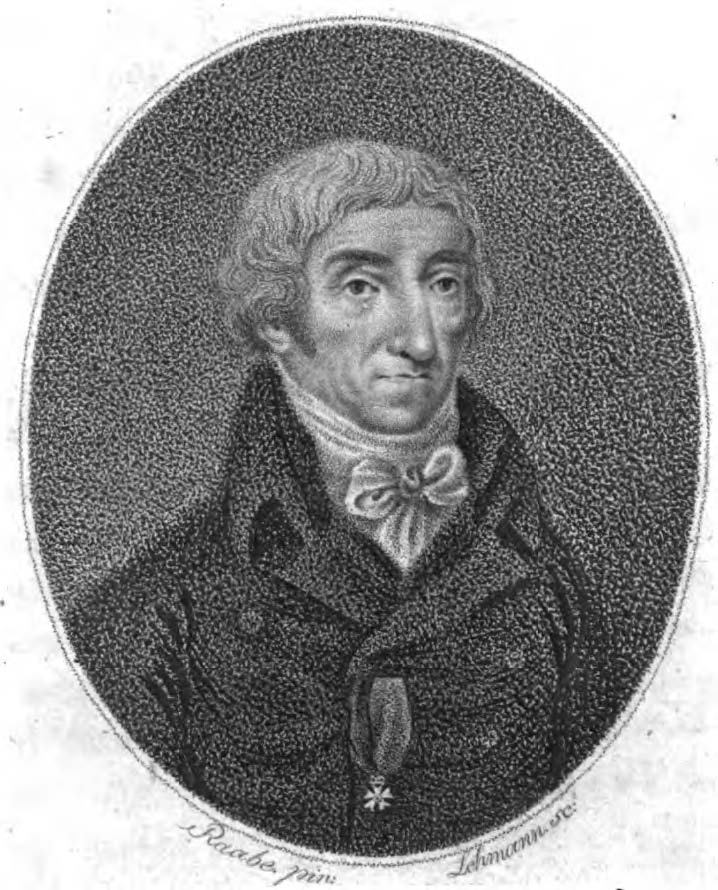
Jean-François de Bourgoing

Jean-François, baron de Bourgoing (20 November 1748 in Nevers – 20 July 1811 in Karlovy Vary) was a French diplomat, writer and translator. A commander of the Legion of Honour, he was also a corresponding member of the French Academy of Sciences, a member of the Copenhagen Academy of Sciences, the Royal Swedish Academy of Arts, a foreign member of the Royal Swedish Academy of Sciences from 1810, a knight then a baron de l'Empire, and a knight of the Swedish Order of the Polar Star.

== Trotsky ==
Leon Trotsky wrote to Alfred Rosmer from Cádiz on 19 November 1916:

Journalists' telegrams which claim I am free do not tell the truth. To leave the hotel I am obliged to let my spy know in advance : he accompanies me everywhere, drinks his coffee at the same table as me (I pay, naturally), etc., sits facing me in the library and spits on the floor for two or three hours. I read a study on Spain by Monsieur Bourgoing, minister plenipotentiary of Louis XVI, to the court of Madrid. It is very interesting (at the same time, it is the most modern work – Paris 1807 – I've been able to find here).
