= Louis, Marquis of Brancas and Prince of Nisaro =

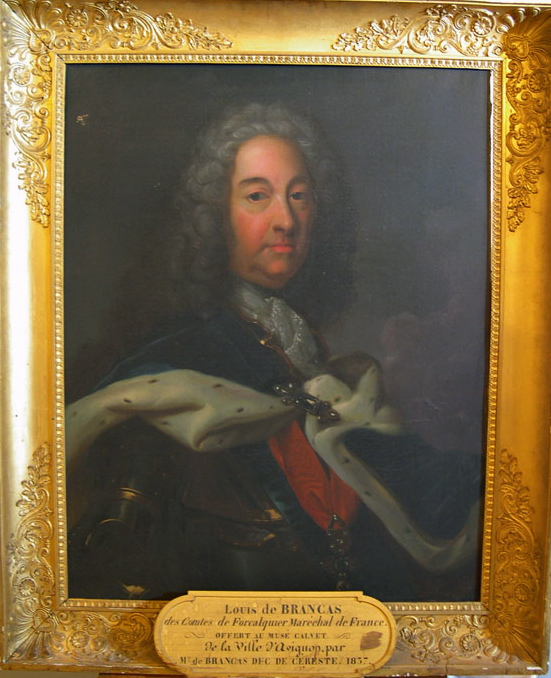
Portrait of Louis, Marquis of Brancas and Prince of Nisaro(1672-1750), Marshal of France

Louis-Henri de Brancas-Forcalquier, (Pernes-les-Fontaines, 19 January 1672 – 9 August 1750) was a Marshal of France and Ambassador to Spain.

== Biography ==
He was the second marquis of Céreste, but was better known as Le Marquis de Brancas. He was also (nominal) prince souverain of the island of Nisyros. This principality had been created for Bufille Brancaccio, count of Agnano, Sicily, by Pope Boniface IX. His brother was Archbishop Jean-Baptiste de Brancas.

He served King Louis XV on land and sea and was made a Marshal of France in 1740.

Louis-Henri de Brancas-Forcalquier was also 3 times French ambassador in Spain (1705, 1713, 1728), Grandee of Spain and a Knight of the Order of the Golden Fleece.
He was appointed governor of Nantes and commander of Brittany on 27 March 1738.

He married on 24 January 1696 Elizabeth Charlotte de Brancas-Villars.
They have 11 children, of whom 6 reached adulthood.
