= Jean-Baptiste Louis Andrault de Maulévrier =

French militarist and diplomat

Jean-Baptiste Louis Andrault, marquis de Maulévrier (3 November 1677 – 20 March 1754) was a French militarist and diplomat.

== Biography ==
He served as aide de camp of Marshal Nicolas Catinat in Italy.
He became brigadier in 1704, lieutenant general in 1720 and Marshal of France in 1745.
He was also ambassador extraordinaire for the French King at the Spanish court in 1720, where he received the Order of the Golden Fleece. He was a commander of the Order of Saint Louis.

His son, Charles Claude Andrault de Langeron (1720–1792), also became a lieutenant general in the King's Army.

== Sources ==
- Dictionnaire historique et biographique des généraux français, depuis le onzième siècle jusqu'en 1820, by Jean-Baptiste-Pierre Courcelles, Pages 107-109
