= French foreign relations during the armed peace (1563–1567) =

French international relations in the Long Peace

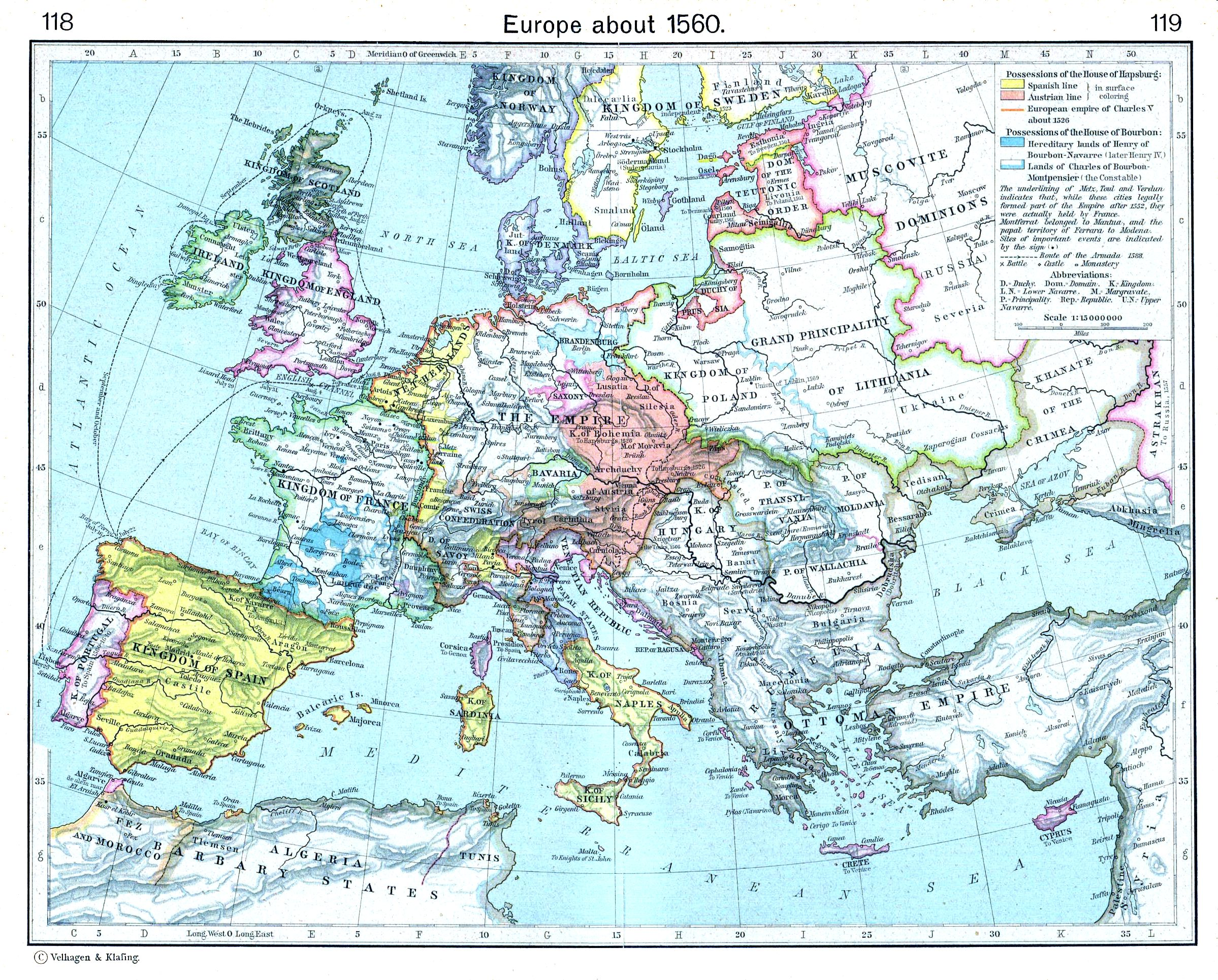
European borders and states around 1560

The years of peace between the first and second French War of Religion would be active ones for France's foreign relations. King Charles IX and his mother Catherine de' Medici were compelled to navigate a series of crises in the Franco-Spanish alliance which had been established in 1559. The 1563 edict of Amboise which had brought the first French War of Religion to a close in 1563 was resented in Spain for the tolerance it provided to the French Protestants. The actions of the Spanish ambassador Chantonnay in France meanwhile generated such cause for scandal that the French demanded his recall, and he was replaced by Francès de Álava in 1564. In the following years, the revolt in Corsica, dispute over papal precedence, and the stealing of Álava's diplomatic ciphers would strain relations between the powers. The Bayonne Interview between the two crowns, arranged for 1565, would fail to achieve any breakthrough for either side.

In the New World, the French colonisation of Florida aroused the opposition of the Spanish, who destroyed the French colony in late-1565. A French privateer would subsequently revenge himself upon Spanish Florida. Off the coast of Africa, a French expedition would attack the Portuguese island of Funchal.

Relations with England had been compromised by the English support for the Protestant rebels during the civil war, and it would not be until April 1564 that peace was made between the two kingdoms. The status of Calais remained a sore point up to 1567. With the Holy Roman Empire there were likewise difficulties due to the French occupation of the Three Bishoprics. Both the French crown and the French Protestants would conduct diplomacy with the Protestant princes of the Empire, feeling out their support. France's alliance with the Ottomans was weakened during this period by the failure of France to provide an ambassador to the Ottoman Empire. While the French crown remained keen to hold onto the alliance, various French nobles attempted to fight against the Ottomans. France also sought to involve itself in the Dano-Swedish war but was unable to facilitate a settlement between the two kingdoms. In Switzerland, the alliance with the Cantons was renewed, but despite the campaign of the French crown, and the French Protestants, certain Protestant cantons would remain aloof from participating.

In late 1566, a rebellion erupted in the Spanish Netherlands which would send shockwaves through France. The French Protestant grandees were keen to demonstrate their support for their coreligionists, meanwhile Catherine little desired to see the kingdom driven into war with Spain. Anxieties were raised as a Spanish army was put together to crush the Dutch Protestants, an army that would travel along the French border to the Netherlands. Various precautionary measures were taken in France to secure the kingdom against a surprise attack, however these measures also inspired fears in the French Protestants that the crown intended to attack them in league with the Spanish. Ultimately this would be one of the factors which led to the second French War of Religion.

== Procedure ==
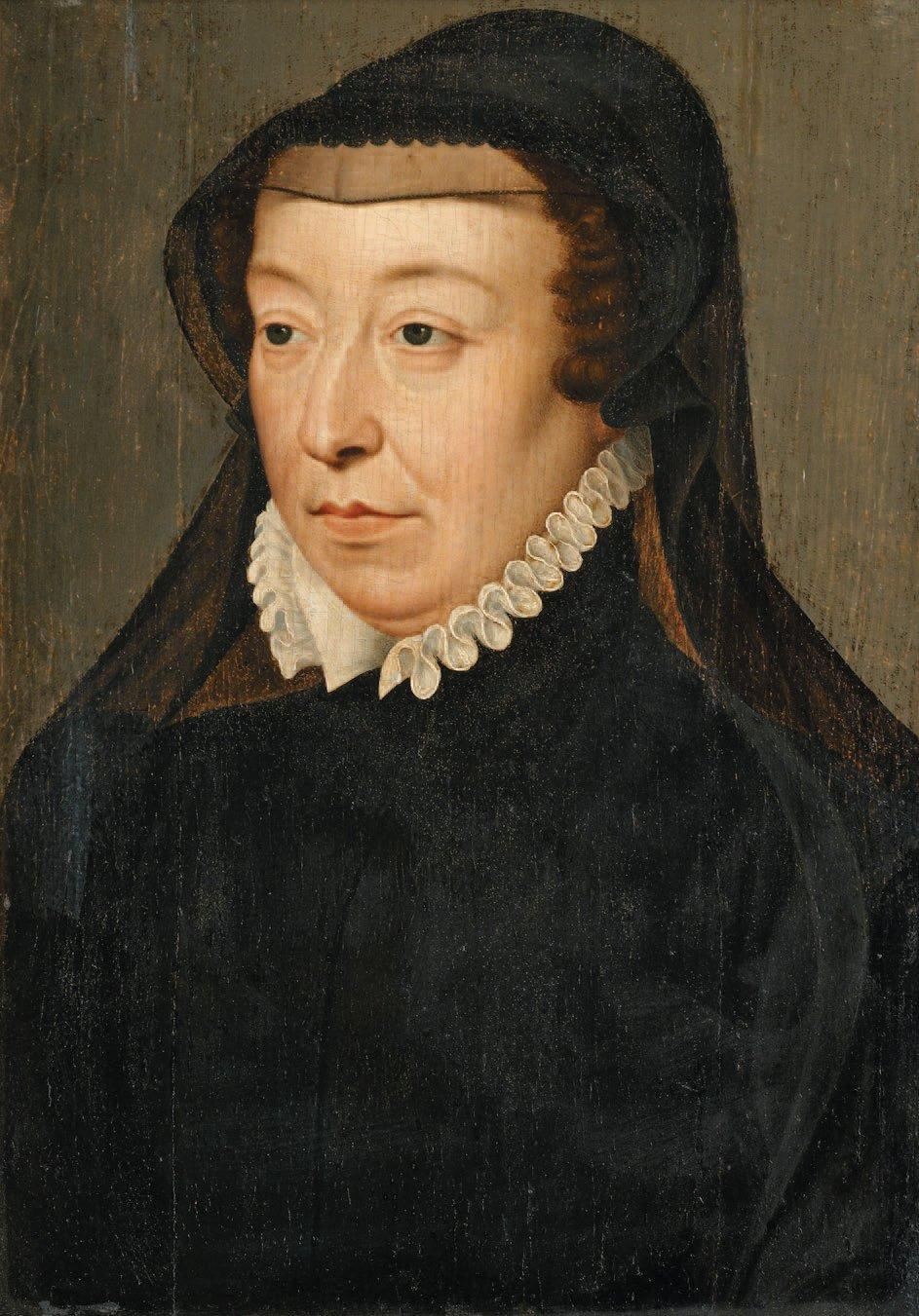
Catherine de' Medici, mother of King Charles IX who was intimately involved in French foreign policy during this period

During this period, the letters of the queen mother of France Catherine de' Medici to the ambassadors of France, like those of her son king Charles IX, constituted state correspondence, as opposed to private letters. Diplomatic packets would contain letters from the king, and letters from the queen mother. This was true both during and after her formal regency which terminated in August 1563. On occasion, letters from other figures would merit inclusion, such as from a secretary of state or another noble. Similarly, ambassadors would write back to both figures at once. The letters of Charles and Catherine referenced one another in their texts, making it clear that Catherine if not helping to write Charles' letters, was at least aware of what the king had written.

Catherine's correspondence reached a peak during the minority of Charles IX and entered something of a decline after his declaration of majority in August 1563. This did not apply to her diplomatic correspondence though, which remained steady, at around five diplomatic missives a month. Similarly, the French ambassadors in the various European capitals continued to write letters directly to her. The historian Gellard uses this to counteract the suggestion that her continued pace of diplomatic writing was an effort by her to fight an erosion of influence caused by the royal majority through imposing herself on foreign affairs, one of the most royal areas of state.

Of the nine countries in which France had continuous diplomatic representatives present in this period, six were neighbours of the kingdom of France. The major exception to this rule of proximity was the Ottoman Empire, with whom the French had enjoyed relations going back to the reign of Francis I. Alongside the nine chief diplomatic postings, the French maintained a further five secondary ones in this period.

As concerned diplomatic residencies that were begun in the 1560s, Gellard calculates their average length as being 43 months. This is almost twice as short as the missions that were begun in the 1570s. The character of the men chosen for the offices varied depending on the locale. Magistrates dominated appointments to Brussels, Chur, Solothurn and Venice. Members of the clergy received appointment to most of the major postings, with the exception of Brussels, sword nobles were to be found in five of the major postings, with a concentration around London, Madrid and Rome. The locations to which the sword nobles were not sent tended to be the ones the crown entrusted to the robe nobility/magistracy.

== England and Scotland ==
=== Le Havre ===
==== Betrayed alliance ====
As part of the edict of Amboise, provision was made for the removal of foreigners from the French kingdom. The French government gave the English queen Elizabeth to understand that what this meant was the removal of the German mercenaries from the kingdom, as opposed to any attempt to dislodge the English from Le Havre (which they had occupied during the civil war).

Elizabeth I was greatly vexed by the betrayal of her French Protestant allies, who had not consulted her as they had an obligation to by the treaty of Hampton Court concerning the making of peace with the French crown. Through her representative Middlemore, Elizabeth demanded the return of Calais to the English in exchange for the English withdrawal from Le Havre. Further, the submission of French hostages to England for a period of two years (so that the fortifications of Calais might be rebuilt in security). Finally, the return of all funds the English had afforded the French Protestants during the war. This was not acceptable to the Protestant French prince de Condé and admiral de Coligny, for whom the handing over of Calais would have brought disgrace and charges of treason. The two men therefore refuted the demands made by their former ally. They were able to exploit the relative ignorance of the English ambassador Thomas Smith concerning the agreement they had made with Elizabeth the previous year. The French Protestant translation of Elizabeth's justification for intervention excluded all mention of agreement relating to Calais, being a matter purely of their securing religious liberty in France. This having been secured, there was no cause for the English to maintain Le Havre. Should he so desire, Smith could of course intervene with Charles and Catherine to plead for the return of Calais per the 1559 treaty of Cateau-Cambrésis. The seigneur de Briquemault was dispatched to England to explain their position to Elizabeth and reinforce the alliance between the French Protestants and England.

The English opinion of Condé was considerably soured. Middlemore opined in a missive of 14 April that Condé was evolving in the direction of a new king of Navarre. A man more interested in his romantic pursuits than Protestantism. It seemed likely to Middlemore that he would make the crossing to Catholicism. Learning of these opinions of Middlemore, and the harsh language Elizabeth had used concerning him, Condé complained to Cecil, who assured him he remained steadfast even though his enemies were attempting to pollute his image.

Fearful that Le Havre might be betrayed to the French, an expulsion of inhabitants from the city was undertaken shortly after the edict of Amboise was published. Those not native to the city, as well as French soldiers were ordered to depart by 23 March.

Elizabeth did not take these French Protestant manoeuvres idly. She sent Smith the text of the treaty of Hampton court by letter of 20 April, with particular attention to the clauses relating to the return of Calais. She noted this had been signed by Condé, Coligny and other Protestant grandees. She observed that the admiral de Coligny had affirmed this arrangement again in February 1563 so that he might secure money for his reiters (a mounted pistol cavalry). Briquemault, who had arrived in London, received a frosty reception on 30 April. Elizabeth complained of the Protestant ingratitude, and threatened to expose the agreement they had made and the promises they had violated. Condé counterattacked. He argued that he had no cognisance of the Calais component of the treaty. The prince claimed he and his compatriots had given a blank treaty they had signed to his emissaries. His negotiators had then been forced to assent to this clause by Elizabeth's council, but he had never been appraised of this fact. He had no part to play in Coligny's February reaffirmation of the clause as he was in prison at the time. Coligny took a similar tack to that of Condé. In his telling, the first he learned of the clause was while in Normandy in February when it had been revealed to him by the English representative Throckmorton. He claims he did not accept the clause in the February ratification of the treaty. Daussy notes that the defences of both men are impossible to validate for sincerity.

Both men affirmed that if Elizabeth withdrew unconditionally from Le Havre, she would receive Calais in 1567 as per the treaty of Cateau-Cambrésis. If king Charles was compelled to retake Le Havre by force, her right to reclaim Calais would be voided by Cateau-Cambrésis' terms.

Securing the voluntary return of Le Havre was important for the Protestant leadership. On the one side they had the queen mother Catherine, who would resent them for having to launch an expensive military campaign to recapture a city they had handed off to a foreign power. Elizabeth would similarly be irritated at the consequences imposed on her by their broken promises. Thus, Robert de La Haye was dispatched to London in June for effort. Elizabeth meanwhile sent a certain Dannet to undertake secret talks with Condé and the admiral de Coligny. These efforts would get nowhere.

==== French royal plans ====
Writing to the seigneur de Gonnor on 17 April, the French secretary of state Jacques Bourdin opined that driving the English into war with France represented the best solution to the Le Havre issue.

All the artillery that had recently been used for the reduction of Orléans was forwarded on to Le Havre during April, by 23 April the earl of Warwick estimated there were 10,000 French and 6,000 Swiss surrounding Le Havre.

On 30 April 1563, Charles IX wrote to the English queen Elizabeth I. He requested that she withdraw her presence from Le Havre, arguing that her justification for seizing it was invalid now that the edict of Amboise had been agreed with the French kingdoms' domestic rebels. Elizabeth, frustrated by the betrayal of the French Protestant rebels, would drag out the war with France another sixteen months.

It was only at the end of April that Catherine came to accept the necessity of a military expulsion of the English. She subsequently led the charge on the bi-confessional recapture of Le Havre. Having resolved to recapture Le Havre from the English, the French informed the Spanish king Philip II before taking the step. The news of this development was a frustrating one to the Spanish, whose desire to see the English back in possession of Calais was held openly. The Spanish would succeed in adjusting their view on the matter subsequently.

In Paris, Catherine and Charles looked to raise funds for the prosecution of war against England for the recovery of Le Havre. According to English diplomatic sources, the Parisians responded eagerly that they would proffer anything to recover Le Havre.

In Le Havre, a proclamation was issued on 16 May, ordering all French men, women, and children, to depart the city before 06:00 the next day. Excepted from this were those French deemed to be working in essential occupations, such as blacksmiths, surgeons and so forth. In addition to orders of expulsion, the earl of Warwick (who commanded Le Havre for the English) oversaw the establishing of a new ditch which ringed around the old ditch outside the city.

Catherine entrusted the seigneur de Gonnor with casting sixteen new cannons for the purpose of constituting a worthy artillery battery of thirty to forty pieces for the reduction of Le Havre. Across Normandy, fortifications were repaired and readied in expectation of an English assault. 20,000 livres was allocated to the towns, with 2,000 of this going to Cherbourg's defences. Bayeux, Cherbourg, Falaise, and Granville were all strengthened lest a second English landing be made. The defenders of Mont-Saint-Michel were expected to foot the bill for the defence of a tower there which had suffered damage by the sea. In the hopes of seeing the besiegers well supplied, Charles afforded letters patent to merchants who would supply the royal camp, such that they would not have to pay any tax. This incentive was counterbalanced against the risks a merchant was taking on by entering the sea around Le Havre. There was advantage for the French in that they enjoyed total knowledge of the fortifications the city enjoyed.

The chancellor of France, L'Hôpital appeared before the parlement of Paris on 17 May. In his address, he declared that the recapture of Le Havre was imperative to the safety of the kingdom. To lose Le Havre was to lose Normandy.

==== Siege of Le Havre ====
The assault against Le Havre began on 22 May.

Catherine dispatched the seigneur d'Alluye on 23 May. The goal of this mission for Catherine was to drive England into declaring hostilities with France, so that she might be able to claim they had voided their rights to the recovery of Calais. Elizabeth, playing the same game, argued that it was the French who had violated the treaty of Cateau-Cambrésis by their 1560 intervention into Scotland. Alluye made first for Chantilly to check in with the constable de Montmorency. He then headed on to England, arriving there 29 May. His young age disconcerted the English, with Henry Middlemore remarking to the English statesman William Cecil that he was too young for the charge he held. Cecil was offended by Alluye's 'arrogant airs' and wrote of his "pride and ignorance". Alluye was to demand the English evacuate Le Havre, ratify the treaty of Cateau-Cambrésis, and offer hostages. The extraordinary ambassador requested a meeting with members of the privy council, which was granted. He, and the ordinary ambassador, met with five members of the privy council, who insisted on conversing in Latin, a language Alluye could not speak, rather than French which they understood or the typical diplomatic language of Italian. Alluye enjoyed a new meeting with Elizabeth on 3 June, at which he demanded the restitution of Le Havre and that she abide by the terms of Cateau-Cambrésis for her receipt of Calais. Elizabeth retorted that she would trade Le Havre for Calais, and this represented the termination of negotiations. The Queen was of the opinion that Alluye had come to England to upset matters, rather than make peace. Reporting back to the French court at Vincennes on 15 June, Alluye gave Elizabeth's answer: she had taken Le Havre to avenge the French seizure of Calais, and she intended to hold onto it.

Writing to Catherine in letter of 27 May, the seigneur de Richelieu, who had a force before Le Havre, described an assault against fort Warwick. He described fierce English resistance from the two pieces of artillery that guarded the gate, and the ramparts of arquebusiers. In the assault, Christophe de Bassompierre was wounded and made prisoner. A notable casualty for the English was to be found in the shooting of a captain Treymayne in the action.

The English were in a poor position in Le Havre to defend against attack. The plague was ripping its way through the garrison, and the city's commander, the earl of Warwick, had done nothing to reinforce the defence of the city.

On 8 June, the first French cannonball penetrated into Le Havre. Gathered up, it was brought before the earl of Warwick.

The seigneur de Richelieu, who was serving as maître de camp for the Count Rhinegrave, wrote to Brissac on 17 June to let him know that he had at his disposal between 2,200 and 2,300 men. Catherine had written to the Rhinegrave on either 10 or 15 June to advise him that considering the small size of his force before Le Havre, and the possibility of English naval reinforcements, he should avoid offensive action and await to be reinforced by the Swiss. Richelieu complained that alms for the sick were not being distributed as the receiver remained in Paris. The Rhinegrave likewise had monetary concerns, complaining that his landsknechts lacked pay, and food was too expensive. He warned that desertions were possible. The maréchal de Brissac touched on the same theme, noting that although the soldiery had recently been paid, they were many months in arrears.

Around midnight on 14 June, the English conducted a sortie. Sorties served to reinforce the morale of the garrison, assuming damage against the besiegers could be wrought.

The Rhinegrave reported that the English received six ships worth of reinforcements on 15 June.

The maréchal de Brissac took charge of an army of sixty-seven ensigns (thirty French and thirty-seven Swiss), two German regiments, 4,000 pioneers and 40 cannons on 23 June for the purpose of recapturing Le Havre by force. The commander would suffer with gout during the siege. Overall command of the French army was subsequently assumed by the constable de Montmorency on 20 July. Though the admiral de Coligny made his excuses to avoid participating in the recapture (hoping that matters could be peacefully resolved between England and France), his brother the seigneur d'Andelot could be found in the army.

The French court established themselves at Fécamp to watch the progress of the siege. Montmorency and Brissac meanwhile planned their attack. During June, a certain Bartolomeo Campi arrived to support the siege effort. Catherine would herself attend to the siege at points. She was even to be found in the trenches while cannons and arquebuses were engaged.

On 3 July, Elizabeth gave notice to her ambassador, Thomas Smith, that she would surrender Le Havre in return for the payment of loans, and the return of Calais to the English within three years.

4,000 French pioneers worked to dig trenches around Le Havre. Men and women both worked around the clock to this end. By 5 July, a battery had been established one-hundred-and-twenty paces away from Le Havre's walls. This battery boasted forty cannons, and in Catherine's estimation had sufficient rounds for 20,000 shots.

It was only on 10 July that a declaration of war was issued by the French against England. Writing to the Norman seigneur de Matignon on 13 July, Catherine urged him to make sure that civil discord did not reignite. Subsequently, the Rhinegrave launched an attack against fort Warwick with his reiters. The Venetian ambassador reported that 200 men were killed, among both the attackers and defenders.

Brissac hoped to employ the same strategy that had served the French well at Calais in 1558, focusing the attack against the seaboard defences. To this end, the assault would be focused against the fortifications between Sainte-Adresse and the harbour entrance under the stewardship of Antoine d'Estrées (the Grand Master of the Artillery). The battery against this target began operation on 12 July. That day, 1,200 shots were fired against Le Havre. They succeeded in hitting the belfry of the church of Notre-Dame in Le Havre, disabling the artillery that operated there.

To counteract the French approach, the English looked to employ counter-batteries out at sea, with artillery platforms staged on modified boats. One of the vessels was mishandled in the operation, causing the galleass 'Fox' to sink.

Come 19 July, the French trenches had got within thirty paces of the walls. The digging was made more challenging by the lack of earth, with wet sand gathered at low tide used to aid the trench construction.

A breach was opened in two places along the walls of Le Havre. One at Sainte-Adresse, which was wide enough for sixty men to enter shoulder to shoulder. Warwick wrote to Elizabeth that his situation with this breach was untenable. While a relief force of some 3,000 men aboard twenty vessels, under the earl of Lincoln, was on route, they were delayed by poor weather. Warwick was thus left with little choice but to surrender. The garrison of Le Havre thus surrendered on 27 July, with the terms signed by Warwick on the following day, the French entering Le Havre on 29 July. The English relief fleet, under admiral Clinton arrived on the scene on 30 July, a day too late. It was chased off by the French artillery, which was redirected to point outwards to sea.

Both Catholics and Protestants participated in the royal army that captured Le Havre. Wounds had been sustained by the senior army leadership over the course of the siege. The constable de Montmorency received scrapes to his hands and a shot to his shoulder. The seigneur de Richelieu received a shot to his shoulder in the latter parts of the siege and was forced to hand over control of his regiment to a certain Remolles. Richelieu would not survive the siege. The Venetian ambassador, Barbaro, estimated on 29 July that over 1,000 of the besiegers died during the siege. For the defenders, Warwick received an arquebus wound.

==== Fallout ====
The English army was subsequently evacuated by two galleys and eight other vessels. The French also looted the furniture left behind by the English, to the vexation of the inhabitants of Le Havre.

The French force moving into the city, suffered badly to the plague that ravaged Le Havre. Over a period of two weeks, the new French governor of Le Havre lost 136 men among six ensigns.

Elizabeth was left badly stung by the affair, her faith in the word of the French Protestants shaken. She would be far more cautious about the prospect of sending troops into France going forward. Only the comte de Montgommery escaped this newfound apathy for the French leading Protestants that was blooming in England. The earl or Warwick opined that Montgommery alone possessed a 'true heart'.

The French ambassador in Spain noted that even if the Spanish may have regretted the development of the English failure in Le Havre, they made a good show of welcoming the news. The loss of Le Havre was a blow to the English crown. Among the English queen Elizabeth's advisors, there was little appetite for announcing the development to her. The Portuguese ambassador, João Pereiia Damtas gave great praise to the French for the conquest of Le Havre, citing the phrase of Caesar 'veni vidi vici'.

==== Negotiating a peace ====
After the loss of Le Havre, the appetite for continued war drained in England. A certain John Somers was sent to Paris to negotiate a truce, and he met with the bishop of Limoges, and the seigneur de Villeroy at the hôtel de Villeroy in Paris on 9 December 1563.

In March 1564, the English requested commissioners to deal with for formal negotiations. The bishop of Orléans and seigneur de Villaines were appointed for this purpose. Villaines was one of the secretaries of state, but England was not his department. The baron de Châteauneuf, whose department it was, went through a period of absence from December 1563 to May 1564, thereby allowing Villaines to take on his work.

These formal French negotiators succeeded in convincing the English to accept Catherine's only offer, 120,000 écus in return for French ownership of Calais. Thompson suggests that the 120,000 écus was for the return of Le Havre and that the treaty of Troyes specified nothing in relation to the ownership of Calais, an issue that would burn on until 1567.

==== Treaty of Troyes ====
The signing of terms and peace treaty would be concluded at Troyes on 12 April 1564. The site was a deliberate one, as it had been this location where the humiliating 1420 treaty of Troyes had been signed between England and France. Representing the French, the bishop of Orléans, and the seigneur de Villaines. For the English, Thomas Smith and Nicholas Throckmorton, with the assistance of John Somers. The terms agreed saw that French offer to pay £36,000 for the hostages in England. The treaty was ratified by Elizabeth from Richmond, and later Charles while he was in Bar-le-Duc.

=== Calais ===
By the terms of the peace of Cateau-Cambrésis, Calais, and the comté de Guînes (county of Guînes) were to be held by the French for a period of eight years. At the end of this, they were to be returned to the English in the same state they had been given. If the French failed to do this, they would pay the English 500,000 écus. In another clause, it was stated that if war resumed between the two countries, the party at fault defaulted on their rights. This had raised its head as an issue during the Le Havre crisis of 1563/1564.

The moment seemed favourable to press the English claim as the eight-year period expired. France was at this time menaced by the possibility of Philip II's passage to Flanders, and in dire financial straits. England could even imagine that despite the country being of different religion, Spain and the Holy Roman Empire might join them against France should the need arise. Thomas Smith was sent to France by Elizabeth as an extraordinary ambassador to make this request, bearing instructions drawn up on 22 March 1567. The regular ambassador, Henry Norris, was already at Fontainebleau. Charles took the opportunity to show him around the château and library, including an artistic rendition of the recapture of Le Havre from the English several years prior. Smith arrived at the English ambassadorial residence of Moret on 16 April, only to find the king had departed on a hunt and would be gone for some time. The Venetian ambassador believed it had been resolved upon by the French to keep Calais, but not whether to declare this openly to the English, or disguise their intentions in negotiations.

According to Spanish agents, the English made preparations for war on the matter of Calais. They expected either receipt of the city or money as stated by the peace of Cateau-Cambrésis. Receiving word of English preparations on 21 March, the seigneur de Gourdan hurried to his governate of Calais. The garrisons of Calais and Le Havre were augmented, and a courier was dispatched to Philip II to try to buy either his sympathy to France in this affair, or at least his neutrality.

After a prolonged wait, Smith, and the regular ambassador Henry Norris were received by the king on 1 May while the court was at Saint-Maur. Charles and the French royal council were present before the ambassadors. Smith approached Charles, and in a low voice stated that the deadline had expired, and as France had not provided the 500.000 écus to the English to buy Calais, Elizabeth was demanding the return of her city. Charles informed him that such a grave matter would require consulting with his council. Having consulted with them, the English ambassadors were recalled to the room. Charles informed them that Calais had always been a possession of the French crown. The English, claimed Charles and L'Hôpital, had violated the peace of Cateau-Cambrésis first through their occupation of Rouen and Le Havre during the first French War of Religion. Elizabeth should find herself content with her kingdom's natural borders. The English ambassadors rejoindered that the French had violated the peace first by their actions in Scotland during the reign of François II. L'Hôpital dismissed this. Mary Stuart taking military action had nothing to do with the agreement in his estimation. Smith argued that the occupation of Le Havre by the English had been for the good of the French king. Charles again stated that the natural borders of France were to be found at the sea, and Calais was a part of France. He hoped that this would not jeopardise friendly relations between the kingdoms.

The discussion over, the next day Smith departed for England. He was granted a gift of 1,000 écus by the French. Elizabeth soon wrote to her ordinary ambassador of her dissatisfaction at the French position and asked him to communicate this to Charles. The prospect of war loomed large during May. The Spanish backed up the French over the matter of Calais, which allowed the French to take a resolute position on the affair, despite the disapproval of the English.

=== Marital proposals ===
A marital prospect considered for the duc d'Anjou (brother of king Charles) in 1566 was the English king Elizabeth I, even though she was twice his age. This was the succession to a January 1565 effort, Paul de Foix undertook to see Elizabeth married to Charles IX. This effort was the cause of much discussion while the French court was in Bayonne for the Spanish Interview in June 1565. Álava saw little prospect in the match coming to pass but observed that it afforded the opportunity for France and England to make shows of affection to one another. By this means, Philip might be prevented from going to Flanders. Elizabeth had shot down this earlier proposal (made in November 1564) on the grounds of the gap in their ages, while the royal council rebuffed it on grounds it may delay the arrival of royal children. Her refusal had reached the French court from the hands of her ambassador, Thomas Smith, while Catherine was in Nérac. The French ambassador in London, La Fôret brought this new proposal to the English court's attentions. For Catherine, this was not only a matter of her son's advancement, it was also a prospect for understanding to be reached between England and France. She was well aware England was looking to unite with Scotland and had a penchant for supporting Protestants in France. According to Spanish sources, Anjou, who hated the Protestant Elizabeth, rebuked the queen as a 'whore'. Nevertheless, this project would remain active until 1571.

Catherine would again pursue an English match for the duc d'Anjou in 1567. She was greatly concerned that the earl of Sussex (a leading courtier of Elizabeth) would attempt to rush through a marriage for Elizabeth with the archduke of Austria. The prospect of an Austrian match for Elizabeth was to the distaste of king Charles.

=== Diplomatic missions to England and Scotland ===
At the time of the edict of Amboise, the ordinary ambassador in residence in England would be Paul de Foix. He would serve in this role until July 1566.

As concerned relations with England, the seigneur de Mauvissière would be dispatched as an extraordinary ambassador around the end of 1563, staying in the country until the start of 1564. He would return to the country for a new mission in the summer of 1565 (though this time would also involve a visit to Scotland).

In the spring of 1564, the seigneur de Gonnor would conduct a new extraordinary diplomatic mission to England.

Replacing de Foix as ordinary ambassador to England would be the seigneur de La Forest, who would stay in the charge for two years.

Writing to Charles in December 1564, queen Elizabeth bid that the friendship between the two monarchies be allowed to continue to blossom, as it would yield rich fruit for the people of both countries.

Louise de Clermont, the duchesse d'Uzès, served as a back channel for communications between Catherine and Elizabeth, writing to Elizabeth with Catherine's knowledge. In February 1565, she wrote Elizabeth of the great friendship Catherine had for her. Elizabeth responded in June, expressing her knowledge of the good favour she understood Louise to be in with Catherine. She suggested she would be much obliged if Louise supported the maintenance of friendship between the two queens.

Two extraordinary diplomatic missions would be sent to England in 1566. This was that of the baron de Retz, and that of the seigneur de Rambouillet.

Scotland would warrant the dispatch of both du Croc and La Mothe-Fénelon for an extraordinary diplomatic effort of Spring 1566. In a separate mission Mauvissière would revisit the country around this time. Having returned to France, the seigneur de Rambouillet confided that queen Elizabeth, and her favourite, the earl of Warwick were not well pleased by the protection afforded to an Irish gentleman.

Repeating Mauvissière's feat of the previous year, the comte de Brienne would be dispatched on a mission to both England and Scotland in the autumn of 1566.

1567 saw two further missions to England (and one to Scotland). The one conducted by the seigneur de Villeroy, who visited both countries perhaps for the furtherance of marriage negotiations concerning the duc d'Anjou, the other by the seigneur de Lignerolles.

== Spain ==
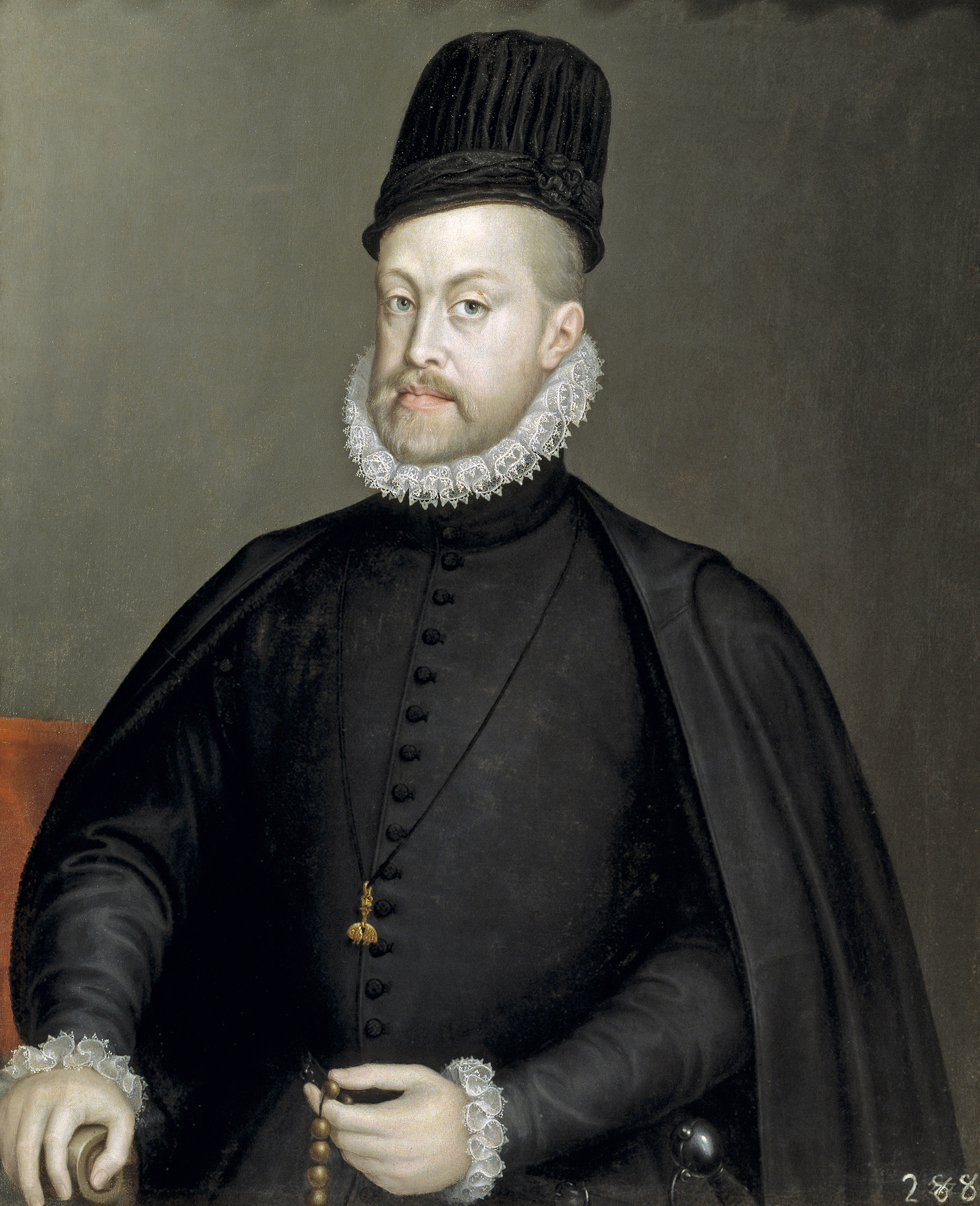
Philip II, king of Spain and lord of the Spanish Netherlands

The peace of Cateau-Cambrésis in 1559 had ended the long period of conflict between France and Spain and made the two states into allies. This friendship between the two powers was not an equal one, France lacking the strength to truly oppose Spain. The outbreak of the civil wars in 1562 had ensured this imbalance. Therefore, the ambassadors the seigneur de Saint-Sulpice and the baron de Fourquevaux had to maintain at least the image of accord between the two states. This was despite the fact that it was apparent to the men that the understanding between France and Spain could not last.

During the armed peace between 1563 and 1567, tensions and conflict would emerge between the French and Spanish crowns in the Netherlands, in Corsica, in the Papal States and in the New World. Though many years ago, problems also lingered from the peace settlement of Cateau-Cambrésis as related to the exchange of prisoners during the ambassadorships of both the seigneur de Saint-Sulpice and baron de Fourquevaux. In Haan's opinion, though there were flashes of tension between 1563 and 1566, the period represented a cooler one diplomatically than the years that had preceded it.

=== Saint-Sulpice ===
From October 1562 to October 1565, the seigneur de Saint-Sulpice would serve as the French ambassador to Spain, taking over the role from the bishop of Limoges. A baron of the south-west of France and client of the constable de Montmorency, Catherine had brought him into her service.

In Autumn 1563, Philip's hackles were raised by several matters that impeded his relations with Saint-Sulpice. He took umbrage with the taxes on French wine entering Spanish Artois and Flanders. He was further troubled by the damage sustained by Spanish ships in French ports. A subordinate of the ambassador Chantonnay who was carrying a message to the Netherlands had also been intercepted.

For his part, Saint-Sulpice resented the building of fortresses by the Spanish in the Netherlands on their border with France.

In 1564, the French would proffer a minor amount of naval aid to the Spanish, a cause for which Saint-Sulpice had advocated.

In a secret letter written in May 1564, the seigneur de Saint-Sulpice alerted Catherine to Spanish troop movements to have her guard up and prepare for any eventualities. That same month he wrote to the governor of Narbonne, the baron de Fourquevaux, to advise him that such a policy of military preparedness was the best way to maintain peace between princes.

=== Fourquevaux ===
On 19 July 1565, shortly after the conclusion of the Bayonne interview, Charles informed his Spanish ambassador, the seigneur de Saint-Sulpice, of the name of his replacement, the baron de Fourquevaux. Fourquevaux had received the nod from Catherine of his elevation to the charge by letter of 7 July, he replying to the queen mother on 14 July. This governor of Narbonne travelled to La Rochelle to meet with Catherine and Charles, and it was there he received his instructions. On 14 September he began the journey to Segovia, arriving there on 4 October.

By the time of his appointment to the Spanish posting, Fourquevaux had already enjoyed a rich career of military service in the Italian Wars and extraordinary ambassadorial missions to various courts. This military bent to his background informed his despatches. For example, in a letter of 17 July 1567 he advised Charles to raise 12,000 French infantry, split across six regiments. These regiments would then be put one in each of the major provinces of the kingdom, supported by a tax on the clergy. Such an approach was preferable for Fourquevaux to the hiring of mercenaries. He showed similar interest in naval affairs from his ambassadorial post, writing on the reputation of his governate of Narbonne as a shipbuilding hub while advocating the creation of a galley fleet in 1565.

Saint-Sulpice's successor was advised to conduct as much business as possible through Éboli, rather than the duke of Alba. Fourquevaux would find the latter figure a skilful dissimulator and forged a strong relationship with the prince of Éboli. The rivalry between the two Spanish grandees ceased to concern the French ambassadors from 1567 onwards, as the duke of Alba received appointment as the governor of the Spanish Netherlands.

At the departure from his diplomatic posting in Spain, in October 1565, the seigneur de Saint-Sulpice made an impassioned plea for the maintenance of friendly relations between France and Spain and implored the Spanish ministers to work earnestly towards this objective.

Over the course of his ambassadorial mission, Fourquevaux would request recall forty times. This would be a feature of around 10% of his despatches, rising in frequency to 19% after the death of the Spanish queen Élisabeth in 1568.

The baron de Fourquevaux chafed at what he perceived to be Spanish arrogance and insolence. He wrote to Charles IX on this assessment in August 1566. Fourquevaux also found the administration of Spain to be very lethargic in its administration.

Fourquevaux was not innocent of strong words in his despatches. In letter of 23 August 1566, he wrote on the arrogance of the Spaniard. He opined that one should not treat the Spanish with respect, but rather with bravado and menace. Gellard notes that we cannot necessarily take this speech as evidence of Fourquevaux's opinions, and that he might have been trying to illustrate his loyalty to the French crown by deploying the established schema of anti-Spanish sentiment.

During 1566, Fourquevaux became embittered that he was not informed of the departure of Spanish couriers, as he had been promised, thereby impeding the speed his despatches were able to return to France (as he would have given his letters to them to take with their correspondence into France). In revenge, he requested on 23 August that Charles put every possible barrier in front of Álava for the sending of his despatches back to Spain.

In March 1567, Fourquevaux mourned in a letter to Catherine that he was not younger, as he desired to lead an expedition to conquer Canada.

The French attempted to size up the fiscal capabilities of the Spanish to wage war. It was felt around 1567, that Philip lacked the ability to wage war in the present financial circumstances he found himself in. Fourquevaux felt reassured by the amount the Spanish crown had spent without making any inroads into their debts.

=== Extraordinary ambassadors in Spain ===
In the summer of 1563, the seigneur de La Mothe-Fénelon was sent to Spain on an extraordinary diplomatic mission. He would return to the country for another extraordinary mission in the spring of 1564. The seigneur de Damville would also be sent to Spain on an extraordinary mission around this time.

This diplomatic mission would be followed by another one in December undertaken by the chevalier (knight) de Batresse to elaborate on the pacification being undertaken in France. With de Batresse was a certain marquis des îles d'Hyères.

The seigneur de Lanssac undertook a diplomatic mission to Spain in February 1564. On 5 February he arrived in Barcelona after a difficult journey, in the company of the seigneur de Saint-Sulpice. On 9 February, he enjoyed his audience with Philip II. He provided to king Philip, letters from Charles and Catherine, and assured the Spanish monarch of French friendship. Lanssac also sought to explain the difficulties in negotiations with England that the French were encountering. This also involved gauging his perspective on the possibilities of peace. Philip assured him of his own good will, and also that the French should put no stock in the English boast that Philip was going to support them. Philip noted he desired nothing more than to see the Franco-English quarrel resolved peaceably. Philip promised satisfaction on a range of grievances raised by Lanssac: import duties on goods entering Flanders, and the building of a fort near Gravelines among other matters. In relation to the French distaste for the Spanish ambassador Chantonnay, Philip was able to inform Lanssac that Chantonnay had in fact already been recalled. He is also supposed to have assured the French extraordinary ambassador that he opposed Pope Pius IV's recent move to dispossess the Protestant queen of Navarre of her lands.^{α} He described the pope's actions as 'inopportune', noting that they would be remedied. Concerning the possibility of a vacancy in the Pontificate, Lanssac was assured the Spanish would not oppose the candidacy of the cardinal of Ferrara. Having left his audience with Philip, the prince of Éboli assured him that other petitions he had brought on various matters relating to Corsica and Flanders would be subject to benevolent consideration. Lanssac took his leave of the king on 14 February, bearing letters to Catherine and Charles given to him by the monarch. He wrote ahead to the French court, appraising them of the happy outcome of his mission. Catherine received notice from him while the court was in Troyes. His letter informed her that Philip would not wage war against France, he lacked the funds to do so, and the Spanish mines were depleted. He then went to Madrid, where he stayed for five days, so that he might meet with the queen of Spain, Élisabeth. While with Élisabeth he appraised her of developments in the French court, and then made his way back into France, arriving in Bordeaux by 10 March.

In the summer of 1564, while the French court was in Lyon, the seigneur de Verderonne was sent to Spain to ask after the health of Philip, who was recovering from an illness. He also brought news of the court's arrival in Lyon, informing Philip of the excellent state in which he had found the place.

Returning from his involvement in the Spanish capture of the Peñón de Vélez de la Gomera (a tidal island on the Moroccan coast), in August 1564, the seigneur de Brantôme visited Spain. His mission in the country was to act as a spy for Charles IX. In addition to investigations of the Spanish army and navy, he was tasked with regularly visiting the queen, Élisabeth, to report on her health, and encourage her to support Catherine's marital projects.

A host of diplomatic missions would be sent to Spain in the first months of 1565. This included the seigneur de Thoré, the seigneur de Sanssac and the return of the seigneur de Lanssac.

Verderonne was again in Spain around May–June 1567, to offer French congratulations to Philip for his triumph in Flanders. Verderonne was kept waiting for several weeks, something Catherine viewed as a sign of Philip's displeasure in the French. She worried it was indicative of Philip's intentions to impose his religious policy on France after pacifying Flanders, casting the kingdom into disorder.

=== Chantonnay ===
==== Disgrace ====
The Spanish ambassador to France, Chantonnay behaved provocatively. He saw in the French capital an ally in opposition to the peace of Amboise, he leant his support to the municipal authorities in their fight with Catherine and the constable de Montmorency over being disarmed. Haan suggests he may similarly have hitched his horse to the delegations of parlementaires who came to the court to protest the edict. Chantonnay wrote to Philip in April 1563 of his hope to see the duc d'Aumale step up to the plate to lead the Catholic party in France. He was to spend the rest of the year disappointed by their relative timidity. The ambassador opined to Catherine that her policy of toleration would lead the kingdom into ruin. He filled king Philip's ears with reports of how the French chancellor, L'Hôpital was a Protestant.

Chantonnay had, in prior times, enjoyed strong relations with the constable de Montmorency, however in the post-war period, Montmorency distanced himself from his Spanish associations, and treated Chantonnay poorly. The Spanish ambassador found he no longer enjoyed any influence over the French grandee as the latter moved to bolster the grandeur of his house (including his Protestant nephews).

The civic authorities of Paris betrayed Chantonnay in mid-November 1563, revealing to Catherine the advice he had given them. Keen to demonstrate the new balance of power that had come with peace, Montmorency ordered Chantonnay immediately cease these actions. Catherine exploded against Chantonnay in an audience with the ambassador on 25 November. She charged him with having written to the Spanish court that she was a Protestant. She also complained that Chantonnay had reported she was raising her son according to the Augsburg confession, painting her as a hypocrite to be one religion with a son of another. Catherine accused Chantonnay of fanning the flames a few months previously by accusing her of preparing an invasion of the duchy of Savoy after the duke of the territory had a brush with death. Then there was the matter of his efforts to impede the disarmament of Paris. In sum, he was seeking to sow discord in France and exceeded his position as ambassador. From here on until his dismissal, Chantonnay enjoyed no influence in the French court.

Chantonnay had reported to Philip that France was an atheistic nation whose tolerance of Protestantism would bring ruin to the monarchy and jeopardise the Spanish Netherlands. He had continually issued blunt reprimands that compromised the Spanish position in France.

At her limit with Chantonnay, Catherine looked to have the ambassador recalled by Philip. Charles IX and his mother Catherine requested the French ambassador, the seigneur de Saint-Sulpice, reach out to the Spanish royal favourite the prince of Éboli. The French ambassador was, through Éboli, to lodge complaint about the actions of Chantonnay. Éboli was the favoured point of contact in Spain for Saint-Sulpice, who believed him to be a 'lover of peace' and the good friendship between Spain and France. From the end of 1563 onwards, Éboli constantly demonstrated his attitude of friendship. At this time, his rival at the Spanish court, the duke of Alba had retired to his estates, but he nevertheless continued to exert some influence on Spanish policy.

Around the end of the year, in an audience with Catherine, Chantonnay presented to her various pamphlets he had acquired in France that spoke ill of the Spanish Inquisition, as well as those that decried the Mass. Catherine thanked him for providing the literature to her. Chantonnay took the opportunity to move on to a more general attack, noting that while it was good Catherine had organised Catholic sermons, they received few attendees, and those that did failed to internalise their message. By contrast, he alleged, Protestant pamphlets spread rapidly through the Catholic population. Able to read them many times, they could be absorbed far more readily than sermons. Catherine took Chantonnay's point, noting she intended to resolve the matter. Chantonnay then showed her one such work, which described the victims of the Spanish Inquisition as 'martyrs' and decried Catholic practice as idolatrous superstition. Catherine thanked Chantonnay for bringing the works to her attention, and the ambassador offered to bring further works to her attention as and when they came into his possession.

The next day, Chantonnay sent a further two works to Catherine. She challenged them, saying they came from Flanders. Chantonnay disputed this in turn, arguing they were from Montargis, where the widowed duchess of Ferrara Renée, daughter of Louis XII, held court.

==== Replacement ====
Philip did not enjoy the excoriating his ambassador was receiving at the hands of the French court, but nevertheless consented in December 1563 to recall Chantonnay, replacing him with a certain Álava. Chantonnay was reassigned to the Imperial Court in Vienna. The prince of Éboli had been on the same side of this dispute, as he also worked to see the dismissal of Chantonnay from the ambassadorship. Saint-Sulpice gave advanced warning to the French court about the new ambassador, alerting Catherine that Álava was cut from the same cloth as the duke of Alba in November 1563 and then again in January 1564. Philip however saw with the introduction of Álava the beginning of a new approach, advising his representative to utilise a soft touch rather than threats in his instructions written on 11 January. This soft touch would be in service of the protection and development of the Catholic faith in France. His prime goal as ambassador was to maintain good and friendly relations between the monarchies. To do this he would employ circumspection. He would provide information concerning Charles and Catherine to Philip and appraise them of news concerning Philip. He would inform Catherine that the reason Chantonnay had been relieved was so that she would have a representative in whom she could place her complete trust. In him, she could confide everything. Catherine was to be flattered, but also kept in 'perpetual fear', cautioned as to the dangerous people that surrounded her son, a matter which threatened his life. Álava was to probe the French designs as related to Germany, England and the Spanish Netherlands. He was to maintain a lively correspondence with Philip's half sister, Margaret, the regent of the Spanish Netherlands. In relation to the other relationships Álava would maintain in France, Philip advised Álava to hold the Lorraine-Guise family close, supporting them as best he could. To the constable de Montmorency, he was to impart the esteem Philip held him in, and had held for him for many years. Montmorency was also to be reproached, for having allowed religious affairs to fall into such a poor way, and with his own relatives as the cause of this evil.

Haan argues that the change in diplomatic style from the Spanish, embodied by the instructions given to Álava was not solely to sooth French sensibilities, but also a recognition of the French Protestant support for the rebellious lords in the Spanish Netherlands, who had just triumphed over Granvelle. Thus, it was prudent to direct less heat at the French leadership.

Previously, Álava had served as Philip's representative to the duchy of Savoy. He had then been a subordinate of Chantonnay from 1562, where he sought to combat the influence of the prince de Condé.

=== Álava ===
As time wore on, Álava would become just as despised by the French as Chantonnay had been. Both the French crown and their ambassador in Spain, the baron de Fourquevaux greatly resented him.

==== Reception ====
The new ambassador, Álava, arrived at the French court on 12 February while it was in Fontainebleau before its departure on the Grand Tour. Great celebrations were held to honour his arrival. Catherine saw to the preparation of Álava's residence in a pavilion looking over the gardens. Montmorency was entrusted with greeting Álava. He was to show him every courtesy. This amused Chantonnay, who felt they were fruitlessly trying to win Álava over to their cause. Entering the royal château, Álava bore witness to a Lenten sermon being delivered by the cardinal de Lorraine. In attendance for the occasion were both Catholics and Protestants of the court, as well as Catherine and Charles. Some of those present failed to kneel during the invocation, to the irritation of the king, who rose and beckoned them to kneel. After the sermon, Condé was asked his opinion on the sermon and opined that Lorraine knew well how to convey his meaning. It would be the Protestant prince de Condé and his brother the Catholic cardinal de Bourbon who played host to Álava and Chantonnay for lunch, showing the ambassador every courtesy. In his meeting with Charles and Catherine, Álava imparted Philip's advice that he hoped to preserve the king against those in his entourage who might threaten his life. Charles was alarmed by this, crying out 'what? what?' before turning to his mother. Catherine reassured him with a couple of nudges. Visiting the constable de Montmorency, they found him bedridden with gout. Álava gave his apologies, telling him he would impart Philip's message for him another time, but Montmorency insisted. Álava thus imparted his instructions. On 23 February, Catherine ensured that the new ambassador could see the young king Charles and his brother, the duc d'Orléans participating in a tournament from the window, the two watching together before her audience with him. Charles had broken several lances in the event, but both he and his opponents held off from putting full force into their sword strokes. The tournament over, Álava began to discuss the project of the royal interview with Catherine. The queen mother was evasive, moving from one topic to another with abandon. The new ambassador wrote that night to the duke of Alburquerque concerning his first impressions of the French court. His assessment of Catherine was that her prime concern was the crown, and that religion was of secondary importance to her. He also found her to be deceitful. Though Álava would spend the next several years as Philip's representative in France, it would not technically be until notice given in a letter of 16 April 1567 that Álava received the appointment as ordinary ambassador, as opposed to an extraordinary representative. He would go on to be Philip's longest serving ambassador to France, serving for eight years in the role.

==== Grand Tour ====
The new policy of gentleness appeared to quickly bear fruit. As the French court prepared to depart on the grand tour of the kingdom in early 1564, the Protestant leadership, most notably represented by the admiral de Coligny, made their departure from the French court. Thus, a major Spanish grievance was in part resolved. As the tour progressed, various evidence of the courts commitment to upholding Catholicism would be given. In a period of happy relations, Catherine affirmed in early 1564, that her friendship with her son-in-law Philip would continue until her death.

Catherine spoke of Philip as alternatively her son and her brother. Philip for his part addressed Catherine as his mother or sister. The Spanish king would go as far as to say that he hoped to be the most esteemed of Catherine's children in his affection for her. He also put her on equal footing with his biological mother, Isabella of Portugal on occasion. In an example of this approach, the prince of Éboli would declare in September 1567, that Philip thought of Catherine with such affection as had she carried him in her womb.

While his secretary was well convinced by Catherine's efforts, Álava himself maintained a deal more scepticism. Toleration of Protestantism in France was not being renounced, and the leaders of the Protestant party continued to be accommodated by the queen mother. Álava wanted to see a Catholic reconquest of France, not an equitable application of the terms of the edict of Amboise.

As his predecessor had once done, Álava hoped to win the constable de Montmorency for his party. He found however, that the constable was steadfast in following Catherine's policy.

With the termination of the several crises that temporarily beset Franco-Spanish relations during the summer of 1564 (including the matter of the cipher and Corsica), a modus vivendi was re-established between the two countries. To reach this understanding, the Spanish had been compelled to re-evaluate their attitude towards the French domestic situation, and the French had been forced to curtail their European ambitions.

Philip was, during this time, distracted by both domestic affairs, and his fight with the Ottomans. It was therefore only in August 1564 that Álava was afforded more precise instructions on how to proceed with the French. He was to regularly remind Catherine to exercise caution, and to encourage her onwards lest she be seen as weak or negligent. Philip would continue to remain somewhat distant from his ambassador, who sometimes went months without letters from his sovereign. The ambassador was thus greatly frustrated that, with troubles having erupted in Corsica, he received no instructions on how to handle the matter. He wrote bitterly on the matter back to Spain on several occasions.

In audiences with Catherine therefore, Álava deplored the ambiguous religious policy the queen mother was employing. Philip encouraged his ambassador to keep up this approach in his October correspondence. He did not allow his criticisms of the French religious policy to become more severe or frequent over time however, even as the court moved from areas of Catholic strength (Burgundy and Champagne) to ones of Protestant strength (the Dauphiné, Languedoc, Provence). He limited himself to general reproaches, not getting into the specifics of religious policy. Catherine, and her ambassador the seigneur de Saint-Sulpice continued to defend the merits of the grand tour in the face of these critiques. Any abrogation of the edict of Amboise would result in the Protestant's taking up arms, a new civil war.

Around November 1564, an incursion of Spanish soldiers into the queen of Navarre's territory of Foix occasioned rebuke from Saint-Sulpice before the Spanish sovereign. For the French crown, her territorial inviolability was a separate matter to her religion, for the Spanish, the two were bound together, and as a heretic she lacked rights over her territory.

In December, a canon of Saint-Quentin, in Picardy, appealed to the Spanish ambassador. This canon informed him that the best way to preserve Saint-Quentin for king Charles would be for Philip to seize it. The alternative facing the city was the admiral de Coligny turning the place against Charles. Álava was surprised by this entreaty and responded on his own accord directly (after having informed Philip of the proposal). His reply was a cold one.

While the French court was in Béziers at the start of 1565, Álava became concerned by reports of French privateer actions. Spanish ships had been plundered and then sunk in the engagement. Álava knew the French would convene a council to investigate the matter. He held out little hope that a serious resolution would follow from such an endeavour.

Though he largely maintained this temperament as the French court progressed through the south, a notable exception to this came in mid-March 1565. Here, when upon learning of an edict which confirmed religious tolerance, he flew into a rage.

Álava viewed the city of Paris as a Protestant one, as it was governed by the maréchal de Montmorency.

==== Triangulation ====
The failure of the French to adopt an anti-Protestant policy in the year following the Bayonne conference greatly embittered Álava and Philip. This was compounded by the return of the Protestant grandees to the French court. With a degree of discretion, Álava had even tried to sabotage the reconciliation of the Catholic Lorraine-Guise and Protestant Châtillon feud.

The position of ambassador put Álava in an intermediary position between the two courts. It was thus possible for him to present himself as a servant of the French monarchy. On occasion, Catherine sought his opinion on matters, approaching him as were he an advisor. Álava also triangulated with the Catholic radicals, taking visits from figures such as the duc d'Aumale around June 1566. Aumale had previously been involved in the formation of a proto-Catholic League in 1565. He passed on the names of the men he took visits from to the Spanish court. Around this time, he also used the pretext of illness to avoid showing himself at the French court.

On 23 June, it was requested by Catherine that Álava come and meet with her and her son. She implied that the ambassador would soon be greatly satisfied by French policy and that it was important for the two crowns to remain close to one another. Álava continued to demur on a meeting. In a new effort to reach out to Álava, a certain de Foix was employed. Foix assured Álava of Catherine's affections and noted that positive relations between France and Spain would slick the wheels of the resolution of affairs in the Netherlands and inside France.

Álava believed the French secretaries of state had a penchant for opening his diplomatic letters and even deciphering them. In 1566, Catherine was caught holding an open Spanish despatch. Such incidents happened around once a year.

==== Turning up the heat ====
With the situation heating up in the Netherlands, Álava finally relented on the matter of an audience with Catherine, and it was now his turn to request one, a request that was promptly granted. The Spanish ambassador met with the French king and queen mother sometime before 20 July. Also in the room for the audience were Catherine's other children, the duc de Lorraine, and the Châtillon. After being kept waiting for an hour, Catherine indicated her company to Álava and stated that it would be best if they met more privately. Thus, they arranged a happenstance meeting in the gardens for the following day. Here, Álava inquired how the French intended to act with regards to the Netherlands, noting that it presented the perfect opportunity for her to show herself true to her assurances. She inquired of him what she could do to cool passions in the country. Álava responded of his desire to see the planned inspection of the Picard border by the French sovereign cancelled. The Ambassador dismissed the necessity of such an inspection, arguing it would inflame affairs in the Netherlands. The two proceeded to debate this point before Catherine relented and agreed to the restriction. To preserve French honour, this capitulation would not be told to Philip II, though he immediately became aware of it regardless. Concerning the principality of Orange, Catherine indicated her son was prepared to install a governor in the place. Álava then turned up the temperature, demanding to know when Catherine would follow through with the promise of Bayonne, and put religious affairs in order in France. Catherine rebuffed this attack. She noted the duke of Alba and Manrique de Lara had not held up their end of the Bayonne agreement either. The first point of the plan, the pan-Catholic alliance, had not been instituted. Álava continued to expound upon the agreement made, and Catherine rejoindered that progress was being made, slowly and steadily. Finally, Catherine inquired on the dearth of letters reaching France from Spain both to the French court and to Álava, something Álava expressed astonishment at, though Catherine suspected an ulterior meaning (that Philip was planning on coming north).

After it was resolved in Spain to militarily intervene in the Netherlands, Álava increased the temperature of his interventions against Catherine. By his aggressive posturing he emulated his predecessor's approach to dealing with the French crown. His increasingly frequent interventions concerning French religious policy paralleled the march of Alba's army north to the Spanish Netherlands.

In January 1567, Álava's intervention with the French crown concerning the piratical actions of Protestant corsairs from La Rochelle outraged king Charles. In a letter to Fourquevaux of 26 January, Charles described how Álava had, in a fit of anger, rounded upon his mother. In the king's opinion, the Spanish ambassador had gone over the line in his fiery words. Charles was concerned of what 'outrageous' things Álava might report back to Philip in his correspondence and advised Fourquevaux should he encounter such talk in Spain to reply as the king had done. In March 1567, he defended himself against Álava's attacks concerning the corsairs in a letter to Fourquevaux in which he enumerated the counter measures he had undertaken against the pirates. He elaborated though that to go beyond this and try to put restrictions on French trade on the seas was an overreach from the Spanish.

Charles saw the architect of this more combative Spanish diplomacy to be Álava's secretary Aguilon. He noted that Aguilon had undertaken a secret trip to Flanders and that upon his return, he had inflamed the Spanish ambassador against Catherine and Charles.

Álava's most comprehensive denunciation of the French court for Philip's ears was composed around March 1567. He opined that if Catherine was still Catholic, it was only for the sake of her children, and to appease Philip and the Holy Roman Emperor. The constable de Montmorency was similarly restrained by the thought of his children. Condé was out of control in his Protestant action. L'Aubespine, the bishop of Orléans, the bishop of Limoges, the seigneur de Lanssac and seigneur de Gonnor were lost. Both the admiral de Coligny and seigneur d'Andelot were kept in favour and with intention of future employ.

=== Élisabeth ===
==== Intermediary ====
Catherine wrote regularly to her daughter, the queen of Spain, Élisabeth. Between 1559 and 1568 she sent her daughter forty-nine letters. She had great ambitions for the influence that her daughter might wield towards French interests in her adopted country. The historian Gellard notes that she sometimes wrote to her daughter as if she herself was a French ambassador, and that the contents of these letters would be considered instructions if written to a diplomat. She was to keep Philip enraptured with the French alliance and assume an active political role of her own. The historian Édouard argues that in this, Catherine misjudged the limits of the role Élisabeth had the capacity to play in Spanish politics. As concerned Élisabeth's relations with her mother, the contemporary Brantôme characterises the daughters' relationship with her mother as one of fearful respect. Élisabeth was to never have opened a letter from her mother without trembling at the possibility she might have disappointed her. In addition to providing Élisabeth with her own letters, the ambassador Fourquevaux would regularly provide her the letters intended for Philip, so that she might be the one to give them to her husband. The emotional manipulation went both ways however. Élisabeth would put her pen to letters in favour of the Spanish religious position as related to French politics. She also did not speak to the French ambassadors without her husband's knowledge, and Philip communicated with the French ambassadors through her. The Queen's entourage had had its French elements heavily curtailed as of the early 1560's. Ribera describes Catherine's hope that her daughter could shape her husband's foreign policy in favour of the French as an 'illusion'. The historian Douais argues that Élisabeth was very effective in representing French interests in Spain. Gellard cautions against the extent of Élisabeth's service of French interests, citing more recent research.

A complication in the relationship of Élisabeth and Philip was how rarely the French princess saw her husband. He was often absent from court, rarely taking her with him on journeys. Though she had begged to come with Philip to the cortes of Monzón, Philip would not allow her to. When he was present, they often slept in separate beds, and she always ate alone. Indeed, the Venetian ambassador reported that months could pass in between invites to dine with Philip.

Letters from Élisabeth to her mother and brother would sometimes constitute part of the diplomatic despatch the French ambassadors sent home, and could even delay the sending of the communique, as in September 1567.

==== Relationship with the French ambassadors ====
The French ambassador, the seigneur de Saint-Sulpice, and the queen of Spain, Élisabeth enjoyed warm relations, and in his embassy to Spain, Ribera writes that it could be seen that the two worked as a diplomatic pair. Indeed, in October 1564, Saint-Sulpice wrote to Catherine that Élisabeth had great influence over her husband and she worked dexterously to maintain the Franco-Spanish relationship. Saint-Sulpice's successor as ambassador, the baron de Fourquevaux also looked to Élisabeth to further the French diplomatic agenda, as indeed he had been instructed to do before his departure for Spain in his brief. By the time Fourquevaux ascended to the charge, Élisabeth had reached the age of twenty, and was more able to exercise a political role than she had been when she first arrived in Spain as a child. In the first meeting of the two, shortly after his appointment, Fourquevaux reminded her of the affection she must always hold for the Valois and France. Élisabeth responded that her feelings on this matter would never cool, and the intensity of these feelings had been confirmed by the Bayonne meeting. Fourquevaux then outlined that she must do what she could to involve herself in her husband's affairs, so that she might appraise the French of anything pertinent to their interests. She could appraise the ambassadors of Philip's mood, as well as that of the larger Spanish court. When Philip was absent, she could serve as an intermediary. Of all the French ambassadors of this period, it was only Fourquevaux who was able to continue relations with Philip in his absence from the Spanish court, because he utilised Élisabeth as an intermediary. It was typical that before any audience the ambassadors held with Philip, they would first meet with Élisabeth and broach the matters they intended to discuss with her husband. In addition to the support Élisabeth provided the ambassadors, they assisted her in managing her relations with her husband Philip and mother Catherine. For example, she took advise from Fourquevaux on occasion on what to write to Catherine. Catherine would urge her daughter to conceal her poor health from her husband, out of fear that it could be an origin point for the distancing of relations between the couple.

Élisabeth showed great affection for Fourquevaux. On 4 February 1567, the latter wrote to Catherine that she had honoured him by involving herself in the baptism of his son, holding the child on the occasion. The great favour Élisabeth and Philip showed Fourquevaux would eventually be a source of awkwardness for Fourquevaux, as it fostered suspicion of him in the French court.

Fourquevaux identified the aftermath of the interview at Bayonne as a turning point in Élisabeth's willingness and ability to act as agent of French influence in Spain. The ambassador alleged that she was quicker to intervene with Philip in support of Catherine. She also expressed interest in being appraised of French developments so that she might know when affairs were developing in Spain that might be to Charles' interest. Come 1568, the Spanish ambassador in France was complaining about Élisabeth's behaviour.

==== First pregnancy ====
Catherine was greatly desirous that her daughter, Élisabeth, would produce an heir for the Spanish king. She was therefore very interested in the possibility of her daughter's pregnancy. In February 1564, Catherine wrote various pieces of advice to Élisabeth including counselling her to wake and bed early in the hopes that this might better enable pregnancy. In May, Saint-Sulpice wrote to the governor of Narbonne, the baron de Fourquevaux in his pre-ambassadorial role, on Élisabeth's pleasure that her husband had returned from Monzón, and the ambassador's hope to see a son born to the couple in nine months. On 4 June 1564, a certain mademoiselle de Ribérac informed Claude de Gontaut, wife of the French ambassador in Spain, of Ėlisabeth's stomach aches and vomiting. When word of this sign of pregnancy reached the French court, it was greeted with much pleasure. Charles IX wrote to the seigneur de Saint-Sulpice to express his satisfaction with the news on 18 August 1564, while Catherine informed the ambassador of her intention to send French midwives to her daughter. The pregnancy went poorly, and Élisabeth was several times on the verge of death. Bloodletting was undertaken multiple times. Only a few days after Charles had written to express his satisfaction, on 23 August, Catherine summoned Álava to her. As a result of Élisabeth's bloodletting, she had fallen into a death like lethargy and had received her last rights. Álava sought to reassure Catherine about her daughter's health but the queen mother was inconsolable and demanded to know whether there were any more serious developments for her health than those which had been included in the duke of Alba's letter. In the end the pregnancy ended in a double miscarriage around three months into its progress at some point during August. Several days after the miscarriage, Élisabeth suffered seizures that left her in a state of delirium. After several weeks in this precarious state, Élisabeth returned to good health. Saint-Sulpice gave the vicomte d'Orthe the urgent mission of informing Catherine that her daughter was out of medical danger around the end of August. Processions were organised in Madrid in favour of her recovery. By 3 September, Saint-Sulpice was able to write to Catherine that her daughter's health was good. He emphasised that there was much celebration across the peninsula at her recovery, and that while she had been suffering many acts of piety and devotion had been undertaken. Catherine likewise ordered processions to take place in Avignon (where the court was at this time) and in the capital. The doctors were able to inform Philip that his wife would be able to be the queen of Spain once more. Philip was greatly impacted by his wife's health troubles. Champion argues that the episode increased the intimacy of the Spanish royal couple. The king consented to the presence of two experienced women from France for any future pregnancies his wife had. Catherine was relieved to know that the trouble had passed for her daughter but was keen to ensure that no further bloodletting was performed on Élisabeth and wrote on this subject to Saint-Sulpice.

==== Rumours of new pregnancy ====
Scarcely had Élisabeth recovered from this near-death pregnancy experience than new rumours of a pregnancy (from a prophecy of Nostradamus) caused the seigneur de Méru to be sent to Spain in November to investigate their veracity. His mission also served to show Catherine's thanks to Philip for the care he had shown Élisabeth during her recent illness. Méru stayed at the Spanish court from 7 to 21 November. Philip showered Méru with great attentions, demonstrating his interest in the sons of the constable de Montmorency.

The baron de Fourquevaux, who had replaced the seigneur de Saint-Sulpice as the French ambassador to Spain, reported on the introduction to Élisabeth of a 'conception trick' that Catherine had recommended her daughter adopt on 21 November 1565. He noted that this had been opposed by Juan Manrique de Lara until it received the approval of Spanish doctors. These French pressures on the young Élisabeth (who was then only eighteen) to deliver a child caused her difficulty.

==== New pregnancy ====
Come January 1566, Élisabeth was confirmed to be pregnant again. Fourquevaux wrote that he had offered her a French midwife, but that she had assured him she had a very competent Spanish midwife, and that a foreign midwife would cause difficulties. The ambassador also reported that Philip was falling more deeply in love with Élisabeth, and that the pregnancy had made her 'more beautiful'. The ex-ambassador Saint-Sulpice wrote to Élisabeth to congratulate her in February 1566. The French court dispatched the seigneur de Villeroy to Spain to offer congratulations to Élisabeth and Philip. The duc d'Orléans, Élisabeth's sister, had hoped to be the one sent into Spain for this occasion. Philip had written to his French ambassador in April asking him to frustrate the plan to send her brother into Spain.

According to Spanish custom, Élisabeth wrote up her will before giving birth. Fourquevaux followed her to 'La Casa del Bosque de Segovia' where she was due to give birth. He reported to Catherine that childbirth was anticipated for the middle of the month. A steady diet of news trickled to France concerning the final weeks of the pregnancy. In the final days before Élisabeth gave birth, both Philip and the duke of Alba opined that they hoped it was a daughter rather than a son. Ribera argues this was because they did not wish to see a grandson of Catherine ascend the Spanish throne. On 12 August, Élisabeth gave birth to a daughter, Isabella Clara Eugenia. Fourquevaux was then able to update Catherine on 18 August that Élisabeth was somewhat unwell after the birth of her daughter. News of the birth of a daughter elicited elation in France, Charles took to Paris in disguises, arranging dances and bonfires. Meanwhile, Catherine wept tears of joy upon learning of the care Philip had shown her daughter. The French Ambassador had a very low opinion of her Spanish doctors, describing them as 'big beasts' who scorned all advice Catherine offered for her daughter due to their arrogance. Her health would deteriorate again to the point that Fourquevaux was informing Charles IX that his sister had come to the verge of death. During these difficult days, the Ambassador reported that Philip was attentively at his wife's side showing the greatest affections. He noted that Philip would comfort and embolden her courage, and visit frequently throughout the night and day. The baptism of Isabella transpired on 25 August, which was the feast day of saint Louis, patron saint of the French monarchs.

The seigneur de Saint-Sulpice was sent as the extraordinary French ambassador to Spain to offer the congratulations on the birth of Isabella. The choice of Saint-Sulpice surprised Álava, who took the former ambassador to be in the pocket of the Protestant Châtillon. Saint-Sulpice reported back to Catherine on 25 September that Élisabeth had been pleased to see him, and they had enjoyed a pleasant interview. He also noted that Philip was attentive to his responsibilities as a husband and a father. His mission concluded in October 1566.

==== Third pregnancy ====
Come February 1567, Fourquevaux was again able to report to the French court on Élisabeth's pregnancy, he noted that Philip suspected the child would be a girl. As with Élisabeth's first pregnancy, regular updates were sent from Fourquevaux to Catherine as it progressed. In discussions with the prince of Éboli around June 1567, the Spanish grandee confided in Fourquevaux that any son Élisabeth had would surely inherit the kingdom, due to the reproductive defects of Philip's only son don Carlos. Éboli looked positively on this prospect as one that might bind the two kingdoms together. Come 6 October, Élisabeth gave birth to her second daughter, Catalina Micaela. The name Catalina was chosen as a tribute to the child's grandmother, Catherine. Fourquevaux was distraught that she had not given birth to a son. Philip wrote to Catherine on the matter that his wife was in a good way but would perhaps be even better if she had given birth to a boy. He noted that this might derive from Catherine's desire for a grandson and urged her to express the same enthusiasm for another granddaughter as she would a grandson, to spare her daughter any grief. Concerning the two daughters that Élisabeth had borne, Fourquevaux noted to Catherine that the alliance with Spain was more than ratified by their birth. Having received the news, in October Charles instructed the governor of Péronne to fire off all the cannons of the border town (with the Spanish Netherlands) so the French pleasure could be clearly understood by the neighbouring Spanish. Around the end of the year, a certain La Prêtre was sent to the Spanish court to offer the French congratulations on the birth.

Only two months after this birth, Élisabeth was pregnant again. Her health was in increasingly dire straits, and over the course of the pregnancy Fourquevaux was regularly reporting back to France on her illnesses and deteriorating condition. On 3 October 1568, Élisabeth died of a miscarriage.

==== Bayonne Interview ====
It had been a project of the French crown since 1559 to arrange for a face-to-face meeting between the French and Spanish sovereign. After years of campaigning, a watered-down version of this was granted in 1565 in which the French king Charles and Catherine met with the queen Élisabeth, and the duke of Alba (Philip absenting himself).

The time at Bayonne was split between celebrations and negotiations. The Spanish hoped to see Catherine commit herself to an anti-Protestant policy, Catherine meanwhile hoped to use the event to arrange marriages for her children. Neither side left satisfied. The Protestants, who had been excluded from the meeting at Spanish request, assumed a conspiracy against them had been devised at the meeting.

=== Don Carlos ===
The Spanish king, Philip, also had a son, don Carlos. Relations between Philip and don Carlos were very poor. The baron de Fourquevaux reported on this fact back to Catherine. By contrast, don Carlos enjoyed a great friendship with the queen Élisabeth. In 1563, the seigneur de Saint-Sulpice and Élisabeth made an effort to engineer a match between don Carlos and the widowed queen of France, Mary, Queen of Scots. A matter Fourquevaux would secretly write on to Catherine. The cardinal de Lorraine was alleged to be seeking this match, which risked divorcing Scotland from France, as well as putting England into the Spanish orbit.

In August 1567, Fourquevaux noted that don Carlos was a troubled soul. The troubles between don Carlos and Philip reached a head in early 1568, when Philip had his son put under house arrest, with no weapons to be kept near him. He would continue to discuss the imprisonment of the prince until the latter's death in the summer of 1568.

=== Éboli and Alba ===
The prince of Éboli and duke of Alba, Philip's two favourites were great rivals, with support by one of the men being assured to inspire the opposition of the other. There was a great preference in France for the former. In a letter of 18 August 1564, Catherine bemoaned that Éboli was to make a trip to Flanders. She wished for Élisabeth to convince Philip to maintain Éboli in Spain. Rather, she would prefer the duke of Alba be sent off to the Spanish Netherlands. The ambassador himself mouthed off concerning the duke of Alba to the prince of Éboli in January 1565. He charged the duke with a penchant for interfering in French domestic affairs.

== Crisis in Franco-Spanish relations ==
=== Legacy of Cateau-Cambrésis ===
A legacy concern of the peace of Cateau-Cambrésis was the matter of French prisoners in captivity in Spanish galleys. This had been an issue of concern during the ambassadorship of the bishop of Limoges, and under his successor the seigneur de Saint-Sulpice, the French would continue to advocate for their release. The Spanish were reluctant, little keen to lose this captive labour force that powered their Mediterranean fleet. Despite securing an approval for their release from king Philip, the actual release of many of the captives did not materialise. Charles wrote to Saint-Sulpice on the matter in July 1563, and in November 1564, demanding that he secure the captives release. It was at this time, that a certain du Fresne, who was close to Condé and Coligny argued to Catherine that it was proper to lodge complaint with Philip about the four-hundred Frenchmen in the Spanish galleys that should have been released as part of the peace of Cateau-Cambrésis. Du Fresne stated that the Normans and Bretons were imploring Catherine on this point, as there was a risk French subjects could be subjected to the Spanish inquisition. Du Fresne was backed up by the seigneur de La Mothe-Fénelon who gave examples of Spaniards in France who arranged for poor Frenchmen to go to Spain, and who were subsequently arrested and put before the Spanish Inquisition. The cardinal de Bourbon supported these arguments. The Spanish ambassador Álava, who was present, retorted that Catherine must surely know the proper processes that were used in the Spanish Inquisition. This occasioned a response from La Mothe-Fénelon who stated that it was Charles' business to punish his own criminal subjects, not the king of Spain's. After a Frenchman was condemned to the galleys by the Spanish inquisition, this generated a protest from Charles who argued that the inquisition had no jurisdiction over a French subject. The harassment of French merchants by the inquisition, which saw many of them as being Protestants, aroused Charles' ire. Charles noted that Saint-Sulpice should seek to acquire from Philip a commitment that French Protestant merchants should be treated no worse than the English and German Protestants, who were able to conduct their trade without such harrying. The threat that Charles would retaliate against Spanish merchants was presented as the alternative.

Captive Frenchman would also be a present concern during the residence of the baron de Fourquevaux. In December 1566, Philip alerted the ambassador to the arrest and handing over to the inquisition of five Frenchmen. Philip explained he was not accustomed to interfering in the actions of the inquisition. After the arrest of a further seventy Frenchmen in Barcelona in February 1567, with the unfortunate men being sent to the galleys, the baron de Fourquevaux complained to the duke of Alba (advisor to the Spanish sovereign and subsequently lieutenant to the Spanish sovereign in the Spanish Netherlands). Alba demurred, noting that French Protestants were only arrested in Spain if they committed scandalous acts. The galleys that ferried Alba for his journey to the Spanish Netherlands in 1567 had crews that included captive Frenchmen. Charles wrote to the Spanish queen Élisabeth on the matter. He also wrote to the Genoese, in the hopes they might return them from Alba's service. Alba retorted that the French only released the Spaniards they held in return for ransoms. In an audience on the subject of French captives with Philip II sometime around July 1567, Fourquevaux noted that by the terms of Cateau-Cambrésis, they should have been released. He followed this up with a memorandum in August to Philip on the matter. 1567 would come and go without satisfaction. It would not be until November 1568, that he indicated in his despatches that releases had begun.

=== Edict of Amboise ===
With the coming of peace in France in the signing of the peace of Amboise, the seigneur d'Oisel was dispatched as an extraordinary ambassador to Spain to justify the policy. The signing of the peace was necessary given the circumstances in the kingdom, and Catholicism would be maintained. It was to be made clear to Philip, that no criticism of the terms would be brooked. They were being communicated to him for his information, so that friendly relations might be maintained between princes. Oisel also had a more ambitious goal, to convince Philip of the merit of convening a true General Council of the Church, in contrast with the Council of Trent that would include those of the Protestant faith. At the very least, to move the Council of Trent into Germany. Oisel was able to report that Philip appeared satisfied with the peace, and thus his mission had been a success.

In the opinion of the duke of Alba, in discussion with the seigneur de Saint-Sulpice, the terms of Amboise were rigorously imposed only upon the Catholics, while the Protestants were allowed to run amuck.

Though they had hotly protested the presence of Protestants at the French court initially, the firm resistance of the French crown to these attacks caused a re-evaluation in Spain about how intensely they were coming on to the matter. The arrival of the (Protestant) cardinal de Châtillon at the French court was not objected to by Philip. Rather he turned to his ambassador in France, Chantonnay, for advice on the matter. This more measured approach did not mean an end to the Spanish support for the Catholic party in France.

After the assassination of the duc de Guise, Philip was slow in offering his condolences to the cardinal de Lorraine. The Spanish sovereign had been suspicious of the quasi-Lutheran position the cardinal de Lorraine had taken with him to the council of Trent, and it would take the prompting of his ambassador Chantonnay for him to write him in June 1563. Philip wrote a strongly worded letter to the cardinal de Lorraine. Lorraine replied from Trent on 20 July, outlining his positions, which were advantageous to the Spanish. He also approached the Spanish ambassador to the council. In this communique, he announced his hope that the Tridentine decrees would be adopted in France, overruling the policy of conciliation Catherine was looking to establish.

=== Southern border trouble ===
The governor of Narbonne, the baron de Fourquevaux, complained to Saint-Sulpice of Spanish naval build up near Narbonne in May 1564. These fears were dispelled after the fleet put to sea in August.

French hackles were raised concerning the Basque border of the kingdom of France with Spain. Charles would write to his Spanish ambassador Fourquevaux several times on the matter of the border river Bidassoa on behalf of the towns of Urrugne and Hendaye. In August 1567, he charged that the Spanish of Hondarribia were trying to claim the river for themselves. This included the seizure of a French boat laden with wine and other goods. The river was rightly held in common by those on both sides of the border, and thus Fourquevaux must represent this with Philip so that he might restore justice to the situation.

=== Papal precedence ===
Traditionally, French diplomatic representatives had enjoyed the place of second precedence in the Papal court, behind only the ambassador of the Holy Roman Emperor. This was now challenged by the Spanish representatives, who sought to assume the place of second precedence over France. The Spanish claim to overcome France was based on their colonial holdings, which, it was argued, elevated Philip to the dignity of an Emperor (Emperor of the Indies). During the reign of Francis II, the French had opposed similar Spanish moves in the Imperial court to grant precedence to the Spanish over the French.

==== Trent ====
This matter reared its head again at the council of Trent. In an episode on 29 June 1563, the Spanish ambassador to the council, the count of Luna attempted to put himself on equal footing with the French representatives during a ceremony. In response, the French representatives left the cathedral, and threatened to depart Trent. In the hopes of maintaining the peace, the French put the blame for this affair on pope Pius IV, arguing he wanted to undermine the talks at Trent by turning its discussions into a battle of precedence. In a conversation between Saint-Sulpice and Philip II at Monzón in January 1564, the two men concurred that the Papacy had previously been seeking to induce discord in such a way that was to the institution's discredit. In their opinion Pius IV should be given space to pick up the pieces.

Though Pius IV assured the French that they would maintain their precedence over the Spanish, he would, through a certain abbot Nicquet, advise them to absent themselves from the Urbi et Orbi (a Pontifical blessing) given on holy Thursday (30 March). The request for the French absence was justified on the grounds that there would be no place at the blessing for ambassadors. This was not true, the Imperial ambassador would confirm to the French representative, that all the other ambassadors were present for these blessings. The new French representative, the seigneur d'Oisel, saw Pius' shrinking from support for French precedence as resulting from venomous letters they had received from the Spanish court. Oisel further refused to comply with his absenting from the blessing. Subsequently Oisel and the cardinal de La Bourdaisière were summoned before Pius. Oisel, under threat of excommunication, was ordered not to attend the Easter blessing. The pope assured him that his precedence would be granted to him sometime after Easter. Oisel fell to his knees and begged the pope not to force such a humiliation on him. Both he, and the cardinal de La Bourdaisière would ultimately remain unmoved by the pope's intervention.

Rather than comply with the pope's request, Oisel appeared before the pope on 1 April to request he be permitted to take his leave and return to France. He opined that was not possible for him to continue to reside in Rome without compromising Charles' honour. Pius, while regretful of the situation, accepted Oisel's withdrawal. This hard-line approach to the matter of precedence bore fruit, and, fearful of a break with France, Pius relented on Pentecost (21 May), with Oisel noting that this had come after a day of intrigues in which the cardinal de La Bourdaisière had needed to be firm. The French precedence would be visible at the feast of the Trinity (28 May). Thus, French precedence over the Spanish at the Papal court was affirmed. Upon receiving word of the maintenance of French precedence over the Spanish, Philip recalled his ambassador Francisco de Vargas y Mejía from the Holy See and came down sick from the humiliation. Oisel gave credit to the Papal nephew, cardinal Altemps as an ally of the French in this business. He noted that Altemps had supported the French even at personal cost, risking his Spanish pension. Oisel argued he should be rewarded by the French king. In addition to the services of Altemps, Oisel saw value in those of the cardinal's brother, de:Jakob Hannibal I. von Hohenems due to their power in Germany. In the same letter of 31 May, Oisel conveyed to Charles information of a private audience he had held with Pius. In this audience, Pius had despaired for the Spanish domination of the Italian peninsula. He noted that by affirming French precedence he now risked being subject to attack. Oisel opined that if the Papacy was indeed attacked by Spain over the matter of precedence, that the French sovereign should come to his protection. The matter of the Papal affirmation of French precedence would indeed be a source of tension between France and Spain. Though a matter of great seriousness, more so than the contemporary diplomatic crisis in Corsica in the opinion of Haan, the Spanish avoided making an official declaration on the matter. As the Spanish had declared no official position on the affair, the French ambassador in Spain, the seigneur de Saint-Sulpice found he had no need to justify it.

=== Safety of correspondence ===
Around the summer of 1564, a servant of the Spanish Ambassador stole the key to the cipher the Ambassador used for his diplomatic correspondence and passed it off to the seigneur de Piennes. The theft became immediately known to Álava as his secretary had been hoping to write to the duke of Savoy. He thus informed Philip of the theft on 24 June by means of a messenger. The seigneur de Piennes was close to Catherine, and Álava thus saw the shadowy hand of the queen mother behind the theft of his cipher key. Haan states that his organisation of the theft was probably undertaken on Catherine's instruction. Álava filed complaint with Catherine, demanding an investigation be established led by a secretary of state. One of the secretaries of state, L'Aubespine, was sent to offer her apologies to Álava for the affair. In July, the matter was put before the royal council.

In discontent, Álava departed the French court as an act of protest. Philip protested robustly on the matter of the theft. The Spanish king sent instructions to Álava in August. He did not express the opinion that Charles or Catherine were involved in the theft, he advised Álava to follow this line. Philip was satisfied however to see the servant who had stolen the cipher subjected to exemplary punishment, and Álava's temporary refusal to negotiate with Catherine. He did not wish to push the matter further into a diplomatic crisis. The thief, once caught, would be sent to the galleys.

In August 1566, a scandal developed over the robbing of the mail of the duke of Alba in France. Álava reacted with fury. Catherine wrote to the Spanish ambassador on 22 August to assure him that the seigneur de Lanssac had been put on the case to get to the bottom of the affair. He was to head to the post office at which the correspondence had been robbed, so that he might get to the bottom of the incident and punish those who were responsible with rigour. Álava's anger in the matter had been too severe for Catherine's taste though, and in a postscript she warned that if he wrote her more letters of that character she would send them on to Philip who well knew her good intentions.

=== Corsica ===
==== Corso's rebellion ====
In the summer of 1564, a certain Sampiero Corso (who had once been in the service of the French king Henri II) began a revolt against Genoese rule of the island of Corsica. He landed in Corsica on 12 June in a boat provided by the French king Charles and incited a general rebellion. The official French position was that Corso had been unjustly treated by the Genoese, having had his property confiscated, and was well within his rights to resist a tyrannical regime that the Genoese were imposing on his island. Genoese excesses in Corsica made an uprising an inevitability. It was clear to the Spanish king Philip that this uprising had more than just French sympathy. Covert support was being provided to his endeavour.

With the covert backing of France, Corso worked to stir up revolt in Corsica against the Genoese. This was an assault not only on the Genoese, but also their allies, the Spanish. Philip reacted strongly against the Corsican rebellion. He wanted from France a declaration of their neutrality in the matter. This desire took the form of a summons. The prince of Éboli opined that while the affair of Álava's stolen cipher could become water under the bridge, this was a more serious matter. Nevertheless, he assured that the friendship between the kingdoms would not be destroyed over a 'pirate' like Corso. Saint-Sulpice at first downplayed the seriousness of the situation but come 31 July he admitted in a despatch back to the French court that the Spanish king should be given satisfaction on this matter.

Álava spoke with Catherine concerning Corso in an audience of 23 August. Álava was of the opinion Corso should be punished as a violator of the peace. Catherine inquired as to Philip's opinion on how Corso should be dealt with. She assented to the broader point, and around the end of August, assured the Spanish sovereign through Saint-Sulpice, that French subjects were forbidden to support Corso under pain of death. Around a month after Catherine inquired of how she was to deal with Corso himself, the response came from Philip, he was to be punished as he deserved.

==== Álava's investigation ====
While the court was in Avignon, Álava surprised the Papal Nuncio cardinal Santa Croce, who had been lodged near him. Santa Croce was conducting a conversation with two Corsican captains. The Ambassador inquired why they were not in Corsica and received the response that they were a pensionary of the French king and could not go to Corsica. Álava was not satisfied by this explanation. Meeting with the duke of Savoy, Álava was assured that Corso was a dutiful agent of the king of Spain who was ready to reduce Corsica to loyalty for him. In discussion with the bishop of Orléans and René de Birague concerning Corso, the bishop opined that Corso was in Corsica against the will of the king, but that he had been backed into a corner by the foul treatment of the Genoese, and the king would not wish to lose such a captain. Birague took a more hostile position, noting that it was surprising Marseille would play host to a rebel (Corso's representative) and his galleys who had conspired with Algerian pirates, at a time when Philip was waging war against infidels. He understood Corso's grievances, but he had also received Genoa's explanation. Álava expressed confusion that his query concerning the arrival of Corso's representative in Marseille was not answered. Orléans assured him that it was against Charles and Catherine's will that he was present. Álava agreed but stated that instead of saying it was against their will, Catherine should actually punish the representative. It was subsequently added that the representative was a man of quality, and such a course could cause more serious problems. Álava raised the spectre of writing to the Genoese. This embarrassed the bishop, who expressed a desire to negotiate.

Álava's spies in the Provençal ports could pull up no information to the contrary of Catherine's declaration (concerning French subjects involving themselves in Corso's rebellion), and he declared himself satisfied of French innocence by 30 August. Philip and Alba were similarly satisfied by the speed of the French assurances. Philip consented to inform Saint-Sulpice of the destinations of the Spanish fleet in the Mediterranean around September/October 1564. Previously, Saint-Sulpice had demanded to know the destination of the Spanish fleet but had received no answer. Haan argues that in addition to concern about the French attitude to Corsica, there had been hesitancy to disclose this information to an ally of the Ottomans.

==== Invasion of Corsica ====
The ships had first dropped off 500 infantry in Corsica at the start of July, before heading to the Peñón de Vélez de la Gomera (a tidal island off the Moroccan coast) which was recaptured from the Barbary pirates in September. The fleet, numbering some twenty-two galleys then headed back to Corsica, though it was left ambiguous whether the island would be taken for Spain. 2,500 Spanish soldiers landed and assaulted Porto-Vecchio. A little while later, the marquis of Pescara would invade the island with 10,000 men. Corso's allies began to desert him. The constable de Montmorency gave his congratulations to Philip for this victory. Spanish power was affirmed by the passing of the French coast by a Spanish fleet twice during this crisis.

According to Genoese spies in the city, while the court was in Marseille in November 1564, Catherine ordered Corso's son to avoid the city, as he would be arrested if he came to the place. This son was acquiring arms in Lyon and Milan, and boats were departing from Antibes for Corsica loaded down with gunpowder and ammunition. Rumour also swirled that the baron de La Garde was intending to cross over to Corsica with three hundred men and two galleys.

The war in Corsica would continue several more years, with the French continuing to provide covert support to Corso.

==== New suspicions ====
In early 1566, Álava became aware that nine galleys were being armed in Marseille. Further, that covertly money and munitions were being shipped Corso's way. He interpreted this as an effort in favour of Sampiero Corso orchestrated by the brother of the king the duc d'Anjou. He imagined Anjou intended to establish himself as the king of Corsica. Having become aware of this suspicion, Philip asked Álava to probe more on the matter.

Adjacent to this grievance for Álava was that of French piracy and privateer actions. As he saw it, when justice was delivered on these individuals in France, the perpetrators were always found innocent, and their victims guilty. He thus concluded that the members of the royal council took a cut of the profits of these actions.

Álava raised this matter with Catherine in an audience on 14 March. She laughed at the idea that Anjou would be made the king of Corsica. Catherine described the idea of the relationship between Anjou and Corso as hearsay, and the 'support' her son was to be providing to the Corsican patriot was laughable. Were there any truth to the rumours, that would mean they had lied to Philip, which was not possible. Catherine's assurances did little to divorce Álava from his anxieties of a French plot in Corsica. Philip inquired of Álava to probe further on the matter.

Alba would be far more frank about the objectives of the Spanish fleet in the Mediterranean in 1566 than the Spanish had initially been in 1564. He informed the French that they would either pursue the defence of Malta, La Goulette or the king of Spain's own territories. By the means of this frankness, Alba hoped to communicate a lack of aggressive intentions of Spain against France.

== Colonial conflict ==
=== Background ===
Spain enjoyed a commercial monopoly in the Americas. This was to the vexation of both the French and English, and sailors of both countries violated the monopoly. The Spanish negotiators in the peace deals of 1559 hoped to see French trade and colonial ventures in the Americas prohibited. This was justified on the grounds of the 1494 treaty of Tordesillas in which the world was divided between zones of Spanish and Portuguese predominance. The French plenipotentiaries by contrast had argued that the only lands that could be considered Spanish were ones that they permanently occupied. As part of the 1559 treaty of Cateau-Cambrésis a verbal agreement was reached between France and Spain by which the French were permitted to operate in North America but if their ships crossed a particular line of latitude southwards in the direction of South America, they would be treated as pirates by the Spanish.

On 18 December 1563, Philip wrote to his ambassador in France, Álava, to complain about the abuses committed by French vessels against Spanish merchants. Some French sailors, under a certain 'Gatamor' had attacked a Spanish vessel, taking all the merchandise on board and abandoning the looted ship out at sea. Philip demanded the return of the stolen goods, and the exemplary punishment of those responsible for the crime. The matter was still at large in March 1564, as Philip asked Álava to take up the matter again, a letter from the French ambassador Saint-Sulpice to Charles IX was added in support of the cause.

=== French colonial program ===
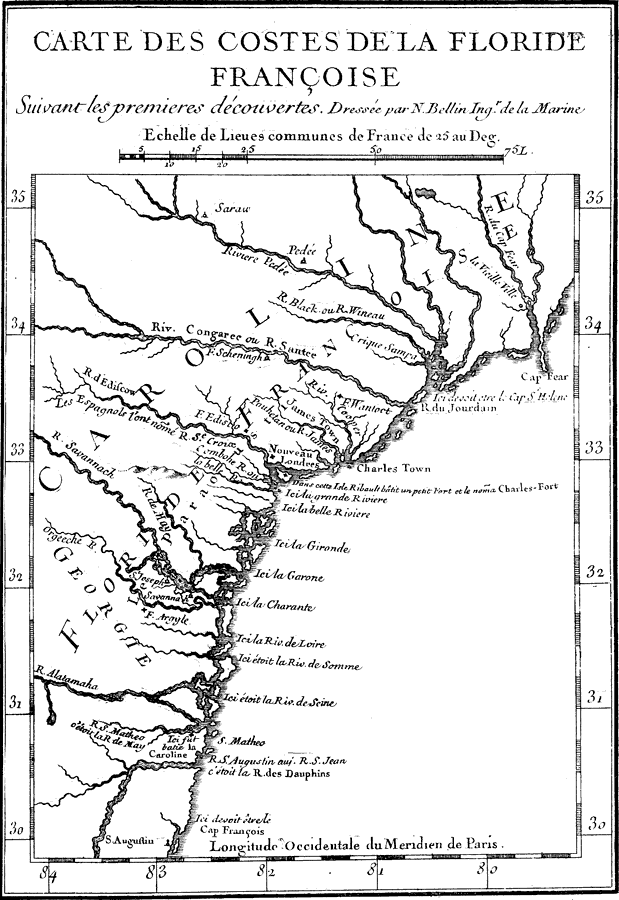
French colonisation in Florida

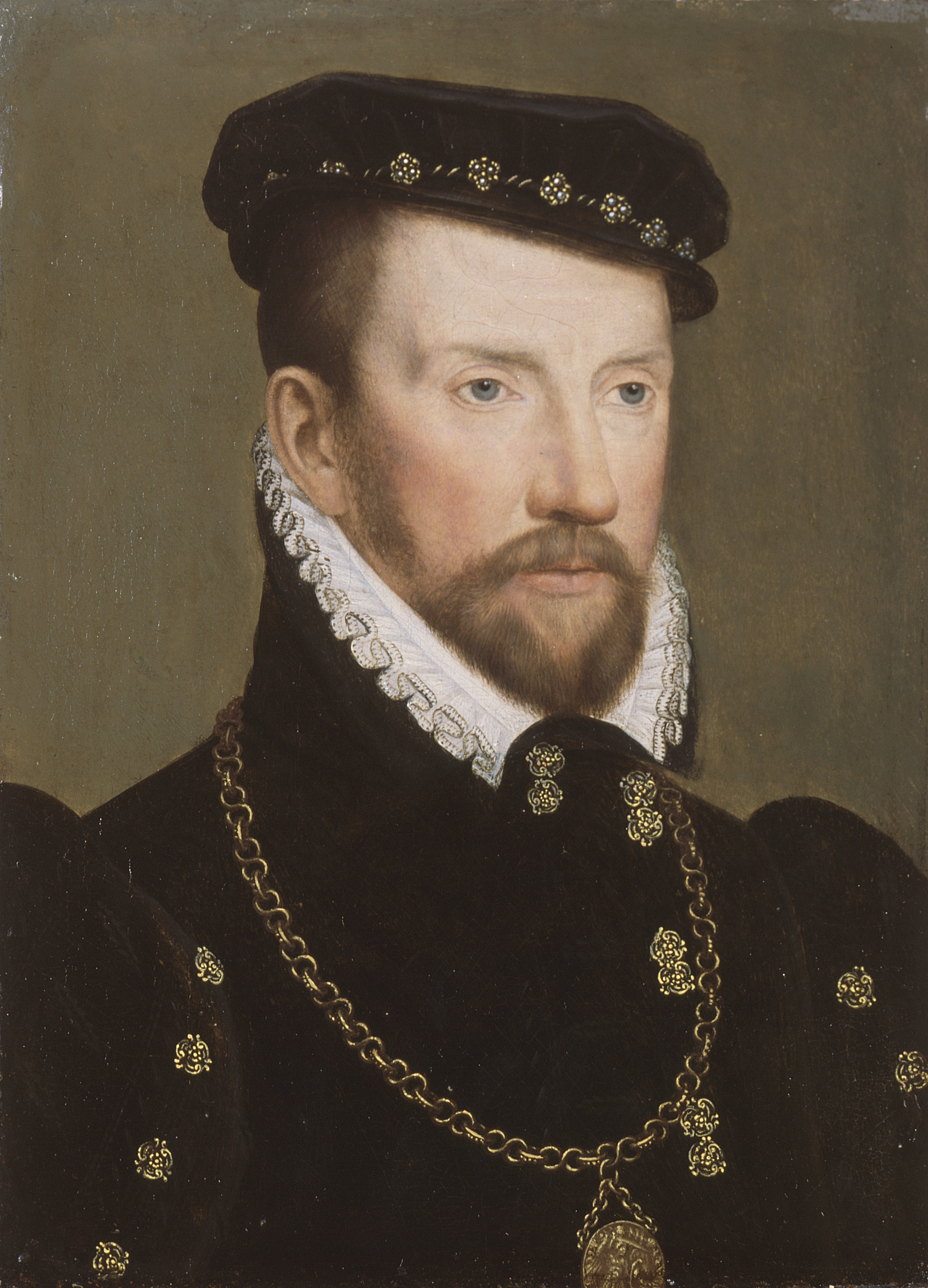
Admiral de Coligny, leading architect of the French colonisation program

Coligny had a tripartite aim in the colonisation program he supported in the Americas. New lands could be taken for France, a safe place found for French Protestantism, and Spain given a kicking in an area of relative weakness for the Spanish monarchy. Florida offered several prospective advantages to Coligny: it presented a favourable climate for agriculture, there were possibilities of trade with the indigenous population and it also served as a promontory from which the routes of Spanish galleons could be observed. The historian Augeron noted that through the colonisation of the southern tip of Florida, the French would have the ability to control the Florida straits, and therefore the traffic that went through them. Though the area had been explored by the Spanish decades ago, they had not established settlements in the peninsula. The historian Crété writes that Philip II was correct in his assumption Coligny intended his Floridian colony to be prejudicial to his interests in the region.

=== Establishing a foothold in Florida ===
The French colony of 'Charlesfort' in Florida was established by Coligny in 1562 but, according to Crété the colonists soon mutinied and then abandoned the colony after failing to cultivate food and beginning to starve. Cloulas reports by contrast, that the colony did well for food through hunting and fishing. With the colonists only mutinying after the majority had returned home for reinforcements, at which point they were then preyed upon by the Spanish. In 1563, a certain Jean Ribault, who had led the first French expedition to Florida, produced a report on the matter to the admiral de Coligny. In the circumstances of civil war in France it would not be published there, but it would be translated into English in May of that year (Ribault having taken refuge in England after the fall of Dieppe to the French crown) and published there under the title The Whole and True Discoverye of Terra Florida. This report aroused some interest in England, but the adventurer Thomas Stukley would ultimately not go through with travelling to Florida.

With the French colony having collapsed, the colonists built a small ship to set off for France. Supplies ran out, and they turned to cannibalism. The survivors were picked up by an English privateer and transported to France. In May 1564, Philip entrusted the governor of Cuba, Rojas, with destroying the French Floridan colony. Rojas found Charlesfort and one of the columns the French had created. He destroyed both and then returned to Havana.

=== Second colonisation ===
After peace had returned to the French kingdom in 1563, Coligny endeavoured to send a new mission to Florida, with Charles granting permission for three boats to head west to this end. They would be captained by the Poitevin Laudonnière. Laudonnière was granted a sum of 100,000 livres to equip his three ships.

Coligny enjoyed support in his colonial endeavours from Catherine, but the Lorraine-Guise party sought to frustrate him by leaking word of his plans to Spain.

Spanish resentment built up against Portugal around the Autumn of 1563, on the charge that the kingdom facilitated the passage of the French to Florida.

Laudonnière found recruitment easy, and among his recruits were survivors of the first expedition. In total he would boast several hundred men, and a handful of women for the mission. On 24 April 1564, the expedition set sail from Le Havre. On route to Florida, his ships attacked Spanish vessels. Arriving at 'cape François' (now named Cape Canaveral) in Florida on 25 June 1564, the colonists began work on a new fort they named 'La Carolina'. Laudonnière erred by flip flopping on the local alliances he established with the indigenous Floridians, first hitching himself with one confederation, before abandoning them for a policy of neutrality. He thus appeared a traitor to his first ally, a certain Saturiwa, without securing the friendship of the rival Utina. As had been the case with the first colony, there was little appetite for agricultural work in the colony. Laudonnière attempted to build some new boats, but the soldiers involved rebelled, discontented that men of their station (i.e. noble) might be expected to engage in craft labour. The Protestants of the expedition were frustrated at the lack of a Protestant minister, and gathered to sing psalms and read the scripture. Some on the expedition were hungry to locate gold.

In December, Laudonnière was seized by mutineers, along with the recently completed boats. The new boats were sailed out to launch an assault against the Spanish Caribbean. The mutineers captured several Cuban caboteurs (trading ships) and the governor of Jamaica. Looking to secure a ransom for their prize, they came ashore, but were caught in a trap, with many killed and captured. Those who survived made their way back to La Carolina. Having been released from captivity, Laudonnière had the leaders of the mutiny shot, and gave pardons to the others. In early 1565, conditions continued to be rotten in the French colony, with a lack of both cultivation and fishing undertaken by the French. The indigenous Americans charged a high price for the fish they sold the Frenchmen. Crété sees the diplomatic blundering of Laudonnière, and the actions of some French soldiers as responsible for alienating the Americans from them. Indeed, in addition to insulting the local population, some Frenchmen set fire to their houses, hoping this would help them to acquire food. Laudonnière came up with the idea of kidnapping Utina and then ransoming him for food. This had the effect of alienating everyone from the French. When the French went to collect their foodstuff on 27 July for the ransom, they were descended upon and some were killed or wounded. Disillusioned by their troubles, the colonists resolved in June 1565 to make their return for France unless relief arrived soon.

In September 1565, Álava received instruction from Philip that he was to confront the queen mother concerning the Florida venture, informing her Philip had been appraised her subjects had gone to conquer this place, which was a possession of the Spanish. She was to have the colonists punished as piratical violators of the peace.

=== Third colonisation and Spanish counterstroke ===
While he had found it difficult to attack the French previously, without uniting the Protestants and Catholics of the troubled French kingdom with which he was presently at peace, the marauding of the French ships served as a perfect pretext for Philip II to move against La Carolina. Philip was also alarmed by preparations being undertaken at the French port of Dieppe, that Coligny had entrusted to the leadership of Ribault. Ribault saw the prospect of a Protestant colonisation of Florida as a god given opportunity to 'introduce the word of the god to the ignorant' (i.e. the indigenous population). In his world view, god had kept this land as it was until now, so that they might now convert the indigenous Floridians to Protestantism. This third expedition to Florida was to be a true colonisation, bringing over to the colony four companies of arquebusiers, guns and powder, and around six hundred more artisans, labourers, shepherds and their families. King Charles forbade Ribault from landing on any island or country, in particular any under the dominion of the king of Spain. Letters of summons for the recall of Laudonnière from the admiral de Coligny were also brought along.

This group departed Dieppe on 22 May 1565. Philip was well appraised of the goings on in France, thanks to the efforts of his ambassador Álava, who on 1 May he had requested inform him of all news about the French fleet departing for Florida, be it the number of ships, their armaments or their crews. The Spanish king had already moved to launch an armada of his own to Florida under the command of a certain Pedro Menéndez de Avilés. Avilés had been granted an asiento (a colonial contract) by Philip on 20 March authorising him to establish a Spanish colonial presence in Florida, and to drive out the French. The Spanish commander had with him 2,000 soldiers.

The matter of the French colonisation of Florida had first appeared in the correspondence of the French ambassador in Spain in March 1565. The following month, on 3 April, the seigneur de Saint-Sulpice reported on Spanish concern about the French Florida project. He noted that a Spanish fleet, under the command of Avilés had left port with the hope of intercepting and destroying the French. Coligny was not without his own intelligence network, and in his final correspondence to Ribault he warned him that Avilés was intending to travel to the coast of nouvelle France. He urged Ribault to ensure that Avilés undertook nothing against the French.

Philip's advisor, the duke of Alba thought the most effective tonic to the French colonisation of Florida (which he understood as being led by Coligny and Catherine) was to send a solemn diplomatic protest to Catherine. Philip returned to Madrid to inform the Council of the Indies of the departure of the French fleet for Florida. In a letter of 2 June 1565 to Álava, Philip noted that while he had not previously made the French expeditions to Florida a diplomatic issue with the French court, it was because he was under the impression they had left without the approval of Catherine on their own initiative for plunder. However, now that it was the admiral de Coligny who was orchestrating these efforts, on the initiative of Catherine, if the queen mother did not stop the departure of the ships from port then Philip would pursue the interests of his state, as the campaign was contrary to the friendship between their two kingdoms. If they had already left (as in fact they had), the duke of Alba would discuss the matter with Catherine instead. By 8 June, Philip was confident in his understanding of the French designs in the Americas, and wrote again to Álava to confirm Avilés departure to protect Spanish possessions. Due to the delicate nature of the issue, Álava avoided raising it with Catherine. Philip preferred to present the French with a 'fait accomplit'.

Meanwhile, in La Carolina, Laudonnière was looking to abandon the colony, as soon as his ships were repaired. In August, an eighty-ton ship and two fifteen-ton pinnaces were ready to go, with an ample supply of grain. Shortly before they were due to make their departure, the English privateer and slaver John Hawkins came by the territory and offered to take the colonists back to France on his ships. Laudonnière did not agree to this, unsure on the state of Anglo-French relations at this juncture. Instead, a ship under Hawkins' command was bought from him for 700 écus. Seeing the dismal state of the French colonists, Hawkins left them with some victuals (including bread and wine).

=== Ribault and Áviles arrive ===
On 28 August, Laudonnière was about ready to depart for France. But Ribault's fleet was near, and was sighted offshore. In fact, Ribault had been around the coast already for fourteen days, but had been enjoying a leisurely exploration of the rivers, throwing the caution of his final correspondence from Coligny about the Spanish to the wind. That same day, Avilés had sight of Cape Canaveral, and upon landing, the Spanish colonists founded a settlement known as San Augustin. Ribault brought with him a letter relieving Laudonnière of his command. He was to return to France to report on whether Florida was worth French investment or not. In a verbal report, Laudonnière was presented a slate of rumours of his conduct that had made their way back to the admiral de Coligny's ears. Laudonnière hotly disputed the allegations against him.

On 4 September, the Spanish ships appeared by the French colony. Initially, affairs seemed friendly, with the Spaniards promising their friendship to the French, and calling out to various members of the French expedition whose names they knew. Suspicious of the Spanish, and without men to man the cannons, Ribault and his ships slipped away during the night. The Spaniards set out in pursuit, and fired broadsides at Ribault's ships, but they were unable to catch the French and abandoned the pursuit. The following day, Ribault and his squadron returned to La Carolina. The Spanish ships were now anchored at the mouth of the rio San Agustín. Against the advice of Laudonnière and others, Ribault decided to launch an attack on the Spanish, as revenge for their prior assault on his ships. On 10 September he sighted the Spanish ships, but they withdrew to a place the heavier French ships could not pursue. A storm now descended upon the area, and much of Ribault's flotilla was carried away, with four of the ships driven ashore. Avilés was unaware of this fact, but deduced that the majority of the French forces were on the ships, and that La Carolina would be little defended. Setting out on 18 September and trekking through the swamps, he carried the fort in an assault two days later. All the men in the fort were killed, while all the children and women were spared. The Protestant bibles and gilded psalters, which were found in the fort, were torched in an auto-da-fé. The Spanish were scandalised by the lack of crosses and religious images and set about instituting these in the place. Two crosses were installed on the bastions. Laudonnière and a few others made their escape. They were able to embark upon the ships the Spanish had not seized and make for the open sea.

Avilés returned to San Agustín on 24 September. The local indigenous population informed him of the shipwrecked Frenchmen of Ribault's squadron who were wandering the coast. They found the starving men in small groups along the coast and, after they had surrendered, killed most of them. Ribault had surrendered on the understanding that he was under commission from the French king, and thus an allied sovereign must surely respect his surrender. The Protestants, under the lead of Ribault, died while singing psalms, their throats being slit by the Spanish. So that they might avoid disease, as well as for religious reasons, the prisoners' corpses were burned. A few Catholics, musicians, carpenters and sailors were spared. Around two-hundred men refused to surrender and instead made into the woods. There they built a crude fort, which was then approached by Avilés in November. He demanded their surrender, which they gave. This time, it was honoured, and they were returned to the prisons of Philip II. French Florida ceased to exist. Some French women who had been taken to Puerto Plata were re-captured by a Protestant captain who assumed a Catholic guise before throwing off the pretence once they were at sea.

Avilés wrote to Philip on what he had accomplished with pride, stating that he had done the work of 'god and your majesty' by his actions against the Protestants, and that now the good (Catholic) word could be spread in the region.

In the destroyed French colony, documents were found which seemed to validate the Spanish opinion that the Protestant colonists under Coligny's direction had the ambition to establish a base of operations from which they would harry the Spanish ports of the area.

=== Word reaches Europe ===
With news of these events not yet having reached France, the new French ambassador to Spain, the baron de Fourquevaux reported on the affair of Florida in some of his earliest correspondence with the French court. The queen of Spain, Élisabeth, had made Fourquevaux aware of the fury of Philip on the matter, noting he would little tolerate a French presence so close to the Spanish possessions in the Caribbean. Ribera notes that in times of tension between France and Spain, the presence of the French princess Élisabeth, as queen of Spain, allowed her to serve as mechanism for the passage of recrimination, in addition to her more friendly role as a conduit for information. The French ambassadors also sought to use her as a diplomatic instrument when possible. The new ambassador enjoyed his first audience with Philip on 18 October.

During November, Philip II lodged complaint with Charles about French activities in Florida. Through the duke of Alba, he complained that the French colonisation of Florida was in contravention of his rights, the friendship between them, and the peace of 1559. The forts that had been built could have little purpose other than to engage in piracy against the Spanish holdings in the area. Charles protested that while he of course would not wish for his subjects to make for the lands of the king of Spain, Florida had been discovered by the French. Catherine took the same tack with the Spanish ambassador in France, Álava. She noted that the seas were open to those who traded with good intentions, and that Florida was known as the terre aux Bretons (land of the Bretons). While her son was young, the 'kings of France were not accustomed to being threatened'.

Fourquevaux advised Catherine, on 3 November, to utilise a fleet with strong defensive capabilities if she intended to send more ships to Florida. This was followed up with a despatch of 5 November in which Fourquevaux described how he had defended the right of navigation for Frenchmen in places where the Spanish had no colonial presence. Álava met with Charles and Catherine during their stay in Tours on 23 November to discuss the Florida situation. Álava's recollection of the events saw Catherine playing innocent, stating her subjects went no further than a Mt. Hercules that the French had 'discovered'. Álava turned to Charles and pressed the matter. Catherine intervened, stating that on this matter Charles should consult with his mother. She then rounded on Álava, the two of them becoming furious with one another. She continued to play surprised at every point he raised, denying any knowledge. Álava asserted that the 'pirates' enjoyed the backing of French ministers who he would happily name. Catherine rejoindered by highlighting the miseries inflicted upon the French in Spain. The Spanish ambassador dismissively noted that she wished for him to write on the concord that prevailed in France when in fact the kingdom was more 'heretical' and divided than ever before.

The more formal French response to the Spanish would be delivered by the secretary of state Bourdin on 30 November. Charles did not intend for his subjects to go forth and conquer lands in the Spanish sphere, but he had no capacity to restrain the French who wished to conquer lands like Florida, that was known in France as the land of the Bretons. If indeed, the French engaged in piratical naval actions against the Spanish, they would be punished by the French crown. Álava rejoindered to Bourdin that this land was called Florida by the Spanish, and Nouvelle France by the French, Bourdin highlighted the old maps which referred to the place as the land of the Bretons. Neither Álava nor Bourdin could say who had first 'discovered' the land. Álava reported to Philip that the French had considered the matter only superficially, failing to take into account the rights of the Spanish sovereign. Bourdin redirected the conversation with Álava to the matter of violence in the Low Countries territory of Lumes, which was a disputed area between the kingdoms. On 13 December, Charles counselled the baron de Fourquevaux to keep his eye on a Spanish fleet of sixty ships, which nominally intended to be used for anti-Ottoman action. The king, not realising French Florida had already been destroyed, suspected this fleet might be the one intended for its destruction. In late December, on the 26th of that month, the ambassador noted Élisabeth's concern this matter could damage the friendship between France and Spain, and that he had assured her the French were not seeking a fight, but would defend themselves if it became necessary.

In discussions with the duke of Alba, that Fourquevaux reported on to Charles on 24 December, the ambassador made the same argument Charles and Catherine had to Álava a little while earlier: Florida was far from the Spanish possessions and was known as the "coste de Bretons" (Breton coast). Spanish ships who passed the French here could expect nothing other than good friendship from the French. This argument had no chance of convincing Philip, especially as French corsairs had already preyed upon Spanish ships in the Caribbean.

=== Arrival of the survivors ===
The survivors made their way back to France, with word reaching them at Moulins through the son of Ribault, a certain Jacques Ribault on 6 January 1566. With him were two captains. These men first went directly to the admiral de Coligny to protest about the Florida massacre. Ribault reported on the destruction of Charlesfort and the slaughter of its garrison. Álava noted the low profile the men kept, but he was able to report back to Philip of their arrival and appeal to Coligny on 6 January. Come 17 January, Fourquevaux (who was not yet aware of what had transpired) was warning the French court that if the Spanish attained victory in Florida, it would be a terrible one, in which all the French colonists were martyred. The next day, 18 January, Fourquevaux learned of the events in Florida from France.

=== Diplomatic fallout ===
Meeting with Álava on 19 January, Catherine referred to Florida as the Île des Bretons and noted that the colonists there were returning. Álava pounced on the terminology, noting that he understood a captain, on route to nouvelle France, had referred to the place as Florida. Catherine gave no response to this but cautioned Álava against speaking so harshly in front of her son the king, as he would not tolerate such a tone. On 2 February, Philip wrote instructions to Álava on the matter of Florida. He noted that it had become clear to them that the expedition was the work of the admiral de Coligny. Charles and Catherine, uninvolved in this nefarious expedition, should see the Admiral punished as would Philip against any subject of his who sought to violate the peace with Charles. The duke of Alba would also speak with the baron de Fourquevaux on the matter. Approached by Alba, the Baron reported he had not yet received instructions from Charles on this matter, but that he knew from a Spanish captain that Jean Ribault had attempted to surrender on the understanding he would be treated as a soldier. This captain had retorted that he was in fact a privateer. Ribault had offered to show the captain the letters patent he held from Charles and Catherine. Alba dismissed this, noting that Ribault was likely not telling the truth on this point, as if he was, that would mean the Spanish complaint should be delivered against Charles and Catherine rather than the admiral de Coligny. The duke built upon the argument of the captain, the Frenchmen in Florida were pirates not soldiers, and moreover heretics, who were a danger of spreading their creed to the 'impressionable' Indigenous Americans. Further, the Spanish were few in number and could not have left the French colonists at liberty. To do so would have been a danger to the Spanish, and there was no room on the Spanish ships to keep the prisoners. Thus, death was the only solution. Álava was told he could impart this to Catherine.

Events were still not crystal clear though, and on 4 February, Fourquevaux warned of plans for a new Spanish armada, to head to Florida in support of Avilés lest the French send more ships in favour of the colonists (this would have comprised eight ships with 2,000 soldiers). Spanish reinforcements would indeed make their way to Florida, twenty-five vessels leaving Seville, weighed down with wheat, powder and cannonballs. The Spanish thus demonstrated their concern about the possibility of a retaliatory attack. Fourquevaux also held out hope that more favourable news would arrive from Florida. The ambassador noted that the joy in Spain at the capture of the French forts had been short-lived, as (unfounded) fear now existed that Ribault (who was in fact dead) would take his revenge.

This ambiguity was gone by Fourquevaux's despatch of 18 February, in which he narrated the massacre to the French court in detail, stressing the barbarity of the Spanish, who he described murdering the defeated. With some bitterness, Fourquevaux reported that word of the massacre had brought great joy to the Spanish ('more than a victory against the Turk'), who wished to erect Florida into a marquisate in favour of Avilés. Catherine wrote to Fourquevaux with a great anger, stating she could not believe Philip would not provide the French compensation and justice to the French for this episode. She affirmed Florida belonged to the French and that Charles was appraised of the expedition. Marble columns bearing Charles' coat of arms and epitaphs were loaded into ships to be taken to Florida.

The massacre was a 'gift to the Protestants', as it illustrated the illusory nature of Spanish friendship for the kingdom of France. The news of the massacre spread through the court, a cause of unheard grief. On 22 February, Fourquevaux reported that the Spanish king had demanded the punishment of the admiral de Coligny by the French king as a disturber of the peace, with Philip arguing that any of his subjects who had acted in such a way against the French king would surely have been subject to exemplary punishment. By focusing his displeasure on the figure of Coligny specifically, Philip sought to avoid implicating the French royal family itself in the enterprise, thereby allowing friendly relations to continue between the two states. Fourquevaux could not support the request against Coligny by Philip, and argued that the French were in waters in which they had a long history, and had acted peaceably. It was rather Avilés who brought the warlike posture to the confrontation. Writing to Charles, he contrasted the posture of the admiral de Coligny, acting as a proper admiral should to know the comings and goings of the French ships, with Avilés, who if he could would surely kill all the French. The following day, Fourquevaux opined that Philips attacks on Coligny were a smokescreen designed to obscure the fact that the Spanish had murdered subjects of the French crown.

In a letter to the king of 23 February, Fourquevaux had compared the Spanish actions to those of the Ottomans with the prisoners of Castelnovo and Gerbes, finding the former to be more barbaric. Around the time of Álava's 14 March audience with Charles and Catherine, the Spanish ambassador fell into conversation with other members of the court concerning Florida. Overhearing him, Catherine cried out that neither 'Turk nor Moor' had ever committed such atrocities as had the Spanish had against French subjects. Álava retorted that there was no alternate way to handle the situation. The punishment was a deserved one, and he had long ago warned Catherine that it was coming. The project was the work of the admiral de Coligny not the French crown, and he should be punished. Catherine angrily responded that Coligny had nothing to do with the Florida expedition, which was the work of herself and Charles. Coligny was the instrument in their hand only. The cruelty of the Spanish towards a kingdom with which they enjoyed friendship and brotherhood was stressed. Álava opined that Philip would be most upset to hear that the expedition was in fact the work of his 'brother' Charles, further that the wider Christendom would not be horrified by the Spanish cruelty, but rather that the French had sent 'heretics' into the lands owned by the Kingdom with which they enjoyed friendly brotherhood. Catherine stated she had ordered the Protestant ministers to go to Florida, something which caused Álava to state that a 'heretic' who arrived in Philip's lands would be torn to pieces. The dispute then turned to the nature of Florida, with Catherine stating she had sent these colonists to the lands of her son, the king. Álava mused that they must have got lost, as they ended up in the territory belonging to Philip. The line that the territory was called the Île des Bretons was again repeated, with Charles rising in anger and demanding Álava look at the map showing this. The Ambassador cooly noted that he had seen it before, and that it did not illustrate what Catherine claimed. Catherine returned to the matter of Spanish cruelty once more. Beyond the Spanish colonial effort, Álava took umbrage with the idea that the French might be trading with the Indigenous Americans at all. He spoke of ships in Normandy being outfitted, and another in Rouen being loaded with merchandise. Catherine inquired whether it was his contention that the French were not permitted to conduct trade. To this, the Ambassador responded that they were planning on doing so in prohibited lands.

Speaking to Philip, Álava advised him never to alert the French Ambassador in advance, as he would surely warn Catherine thereby allowing her to prepare responses to him.

Laudonnière presented himself at the French court on 19 March while it was wintering in Moulins to seek justice, and indeed vengeance. He enjoyed a cold reception. Nevertheless, Charles and Catherine protested to Philip II. With word having spread around the kingdom, there was considerable outrage with their reports. Catherine even implied to Álava that the alliance between the two states might be compromised by the affair, noting that going forward it appeared one could act as one saw fit. Álava was under instruction from Philip to make it clear that Charles and Catherine were not suspected of any involvement in the sordid exercise of their subjects. The relatives and associates of the victims presented a petition to Charles asking for justice over the cruel affair. Catherine took a position that threatened the Spanish approach, she asserted that Ribault enjoyed a royal licence for his acts. Avilés had executed French subjects on French land, therefore he must be put on trial.

Rather than punished, Avilés was fêted in Spain. On 9 April, Fourquevaux wrote to Charles that, as instructed, he had enjoyed an audience with Philip and Élisabeth in which he complained on the events that had transpired in Florida, and demanded justice and compensation. That same day he wrote a long missive to the queen mother on the Florida affair, outlining what he had done and where things stood. He was pessimistic on the prospects of attaining justice beyond fine words. He noted that in discussions with Élisabeth he had urged her to remind her husband that reason demanded justice be done for the 'murders' which had exceeded the commission Avilés had been granted. Before his meeting with Philip, he had again met with Élisabeth to determine the outcome of her intervention with Philip. In the audience with Philip itself, Fourquevaux dismissed Philip's defence of the attack on religious grounds, arguing that Avilés had acted more like a mercenary than a Christian soldier. He highlighted how the French encountered by Avilés were already in a miserable state prior to their massacre, and that it was customary to summon an enemy to surrender, so that they might be taken prisoner, but this had not taken place. He compared the act unfavourably with the acts of the 'Turks', who he stated would never do something so foul outside of combat. Fourquevaux was supportive of Coligny, despite his Protestantism, noting to the Spanish queen that even if he were a 'Jew or a Turk' he would still be worthy of esteem.

Philip took the position that Avilés had only attacked Protestant pirates (who had attacked his ships) in the pay of the admiral de Coligny, who was the one truly responsible here and deserving of punishment. To deal with pirates it was not required to employ the customs of war common between professional soldiers. It had not been possible to take prisoners due to the low number of Spaniards who had made the journey. In addition to his warlike efforts, Coligny was also trying to introduce Protestantism to what Philip described as the "simple" indigenous people of the Americas. He further requested the French disavow the colony. Moving on from addressing the specifics of the situation, Philip deplored the lethargic French efforts to come to the aid of Malta when it was subject to Ottoman attack in 1565. He further critiqued Catherine's policy, contrasting it with the discussions held at Bayonne the prior year. Now Coligny was held in esteem by the French crown, which had even gone to the trouble to reconcile him with the Lorraine-Guise. With Fourquevaux remaining hot on the matter, Philip told him that he could continue the discussion with Alba. Fourquevaux took this to mean a refusal, as he saw little prospect with Alba. The next day, Fourquevaux took the matter up with Alba, who yielded nothing to his efforts. Fourquevaux pointed out to Alba that the French in Florida held letters patent from the French king. With Alba offering nothing, Fourquevaux advised Catherine that the prospect of receiving reparations was dim.

=== Strength of protest ===
The crown was put in a difficult position by this unyielding response. Catherine neither wanted to alienate Philip nor to cast Coligny to the wind. The French ambassador in Spain, the baron de Fourquevaux was sent the royal response. He was to be firm with Philip. Charles took credit for the colony in Florida. Catherine took a similarly forward position with the Spanish ambassador Álava, taking credit for the colony and describing the Spanish cruelties in Florida as exceeding those of the 'Moor and Turk'. According to Crété, the French crown initially pursued this strong line, but soon yielded. The French response had to be limited to this diplomatic rebuke, with the kingdom in no position to seek reparations for the slaughter.

Lestringant characterises the French crown's entire response to the massacre as a perfunctory one. He describes the protest as being only 'formal', something induced by the fact that the colonial venture was a Protestant one, which limited the unanimity of the reaction. By contrast, in Ribera's opinion these above conversations ended the serious period of efforts by Fourquevaux to attain satisfaction from the Spanish for the Florida affair. While the matter would continue to appear in Fourquevaux's correspondence on occasion, it was no longer something he saw realistic prospects from a full-throated effort.

Back in Paris, the widows of those killed in Florida made procession through the streets. Álava despaired around April 1566, that Paris was a Protestant city. Writing to his ambassador in April, Philip explained that Fourquevaux had been furious concerning Florida, but Philip could not have proceeded any other way. He further complemented Álava on the tact he had taken.

In Álava's talks with the duc de Nevers in April 1566, the latter figure, frustrated by Álava, raised the spectre of the Florida episode.

In May, Charles wrote to Fourquevaux to renew the French complaints and demands, as something necessary for the maintenance of Franco-Spanish friendship. In July, Charles again requested Fourquevaux raise the matter with the Spanish king. Fourquevaux would do so, but in the words of Ribera, without 'much conviction'.

The former French ambassador to Spain, Saint-Sulpice, was sent back to the country in the autumn of 1566 so that the French crown might congratulate the Spanish on the birth of the infanta (princess) Isabella Clara Eugenia. As a supplementary part of his instructions for the extraordinary diplomatic mission, he was told to raise the matter of Florida with Philip. Fourquevaux enjoyed some limited success in his efforts. In December, women and children under the age of fourteen who had been captured in the destruction of the colony were ordered released. This was followed by the release of the eight prisoners that were held in Havana. The release of these captives would be the only satisfaction the French would attain.

Around July–August 1567, Avilés visited the Spanish court on a trip back from Spanish Florida. Fourquevaux remarked bitterly to Charles in August on the great reception granted to him, one that a 'far worthier' man than [Avilés] would be well pleased by.

=== Historiography ===
For a time, the chief French historical and cosmographic records would be absent discussion of the annihilation of French Florida. It would be in the handwritten accounts and local presses of the ports and Protestant communities of France that the memory was maintained. This held true until the 1580s. For example, one of the few survivors of the massacre, a certain fr:Nicolas Le Challeux wrote a work entitled Discours de l'Histoire de La Floride which enjoyed a brief flash of success. The incident enjoyed a brief mention in the introduction of Henri Estienne's Traité preparatif à l'apologie pour Herode in which the author compared the Spanish soldiers unfavourably with wild beasts. When considering the massacre of the French of Florida, Chauveton, in his 1579 work, argued that it was contrary to the law code of Justinian. While heretics (like those of Florida) might be punished, it was only proper to do so after a trial. Instead, they had been massacred in violation of the oaths made to them.

The Florida episode would arouse particular emotion in England.

=== De Gourgues revenge ===
On 2 August 1567, a Catholic gentleman named de Gourgues armed and launched an expedition to Florida at his own expense, with about 200 men to his name. He was keen to get revenge for the destruction of French Florida. The brutal and murderous actions of the Spanish in Florida had now alienated them from the indigenous population, and de Gourgues was able to enter into alliance with Saturiwa. Together with Saturiwa's forces, de Gourges launched an attack on one of the new Spanish forts on the river. The place was stormed with the population massacred, only fifteen being left alive. Subsequently the second Spanish fort was taken, with the inhabitants killed. De Gourgues considered this revenge both in a private capacity and for France's honour. These two forts were named San Gabriel and San Estaban respectively. Finally, the Franco-American army approached the largest fort, San Mateo (which was built on the ruins of La Carolina and equipped with Laudonnière's cannons), which had a garrison of three-hundred men. They were caught at dinner and the fort was taken. Thirty men were left alive while the rest were killed. After successfully capturing all the forts, they were razed. De Gourgues forced sailed back for France on 3 May 1568, arriving in the country on 12 June. He received a hero's welcome from the populace but was kept at arm's length by the court. Philip II put a price on de Gourgues head. When Fourquevaux received the news he was perplexed and wrote to Charles that he had surely neither ordered de Gourgues to undertake this effort, nor sanctioned the operation.

De Gourgues would be celebrated in one later French account as an instrument of divine vengeance against the Spanish. He was a 'just executioner' against those who had shown so much wickedness in the massacre of the French they perpetrated.

== Spanish Netherlands ==
=== Ambassadors ===
The ordinary French ambassador to the Spanish Netherlands until May 1563 was the seigneur de La Forest. He would be replaced in the charge by the sieur de Balicourt who would hold the post until August 1566. Balicourt was much resented by king Philip, who alleged he sent tendentious reports back to France around the Autumn of 1563. Balicourt was succeeded in turn by the seigneur de Durescu.

=== Calm before the storm ===
The discontent of the Dutch nobility with the Spanish sovereign had been a subject of French diplomatic correspondence as far back as 1559.

During 1563, fearful of the rebellious potential of summoning the Flemish Estates, the Spanish government in the Netherlands resolved instead to raise tariffs on French wine and English cloth. The French protested, threatening retaliatory tariffs on herring and cod. The Spanish ambassador to France explained that undertaking this action would induce reprisals and annihilate the wine trade. A maximum was imposed on the sale of French wine in the Spanish Netherlands. The French escalated their grievances with these policies up to Madrid, where the issue sat for several months, before forming the basis of interviews between the French ambassador Saint-Sulpice and Philip. The matter still lay unresolved in 1565.

A certain Flemish councillor of the name d'Assonleville reported to the duchess of Parma (regent of the Spanish Netherlands) in May 1563 that he had in his possession plans of Coligny's by which he intended to invade the Spanish Netherlands from Champagne in the hopes of initiating a revolt. This plan was supposedly frustrated due to the conflict between England and France. Sutherland suggests that it was rather the quarrel Coligny had with the Lorraine-Guise that sank the possibilities of such an enterprise.

Informed that Condé was to conduct inspections of the Picard frontier in early 1564, the Spanish ambassador Chantonnay sent urgent word to the duchess of Parma.

While the French court was in Troyes during its Grand Tour, Catherine wrote to the duchess of Parma concerning a Protestant who had gone to Flanders with the hopes of stirring up the Spanish crown's Protestant population.

According to the Spanish minister, the cardinal Granvelle the Protestants were in 1564 continually angling to see their coreligionists in the Spanish Netherlands revolt. There were many reports of troop movements on the frontier in the wake of the Protestant synod of April 1564.

Offers of military support between France and Spain were not a one-way street. When Alba informed the seigneur de Saint-Sulpice of rebellious heretics troubling the Netherlands, the French ambassador offered French support in their suppression. He justified this off the cuff offer to Charles on the grounds that Philip had recently provided similar support to France (i.e. during the first French War of Religion). Charles signed off on his ambassador's advance, and urged Saint-Sulpice to repeat the offer, as it was only proper of an ally to do so.

The opprobrium of the Spanish was raised when Condé and Coligny undertook an inspection of the border defences with the Spanish realm around November 1564. Their actions were interpreted as being the impetus to a plot against 'god and King' alongside the maréchal de Montmorency.

Condé's garrisons on the frontier were reinforced. As 1564 reached its end, more concrete word of the nature of the supposed Protestant plan emerged in correspondence sent to Granvelle. The comte de Montgommery and seigneur d'Orbec were at its head, to lead an army of 40,000 men. Come January, the opposite information, that such a conspiracy was a fiction reached Granvelle's ears.

By letter of 18 July 1565, Granvelle reported to Philip that the Dutch noble of the house of Montmorency, the baron de Montigny, was in close correspondence with his Châtillon cousins in France, exchanging communiques every week. While Montigny was publicly Catholic for the moment, it was rumoured that he was a secret Protestant.

=== Intensification of transnational ties ===
The French Protestants looked to establish ties with their Dutch coreligionists from 1566. Through this international solidarity, they might steal from the Spanish king the triumph he sought in his northern possession and thereby frustrate the possibility of his intervention in France. In addition to this practical reason to aid the Dutch Protestants, it also had the benefit of furthering the 'true religion'. As early as January 1566, the Spanish became aware of links the Protestants had established in Antwerp, Cambrai, Tournai, and Valenciennes.

Despite the fairly open opposition of Condé and the Châtillon brothers to the Franco-Spanish alliance and advocacy for an intervention in the Netherlands, Álava was unable to see in their public speeches religious motivation for this enterprise. Further, the Protestant denunciation of Philip was moderate in comparison with their invectives against domestic opponents like the cardinal de Lorraine, who they put in the central role.

As concerned Philip's distaste for the Protestants of France, Tallon argues that Philip's considerations were more political than religious His trouble with the Protestants of France was the places of influence they occupied in royal council from which they pushed for an anti-Spanish policy. The alliance of the French Protestants with the Flemish Geuzen was the culmination of this threat to his interests.

A risk of this active policy in the Netherlands was the alienation of England, which despite its Protestantism, little desired to see France overly mighty, as it surely would be if Spain was defeated in the Netherlands.

The Calvinist leader, Theodore de Beza, reported in January 1566 that a certain Gérard de Wateville had undertaken a mission to several French nobles (who Daussy speculates as having been the prince de Porcien and the duc de Bouillon). These anonymous nobles pledged their lives and persons to the cause, which was of interest to both countries' Protestant populations.

In March 1566, an unfounded rumour circulated that the prince de Condé had travelled in disguise to Breda and Antwerp for covert meetings with rebellious Dutch nobles. While Daussy emphasises, we have no proof of him making this trip, he notes that other less prominent French Protestant nobles did undertake such travels.

It was increasingly apparent to the French crown that the situation in the Spanish Netherlands was heading towards a confrontation. In March 1566, king Charles wrote to his ambassador in Spain, the baron de Fourquevaux. He noted that some time ago he had become aware of discontent in the Spanish Netherlands, and that now it seemed to be reaching a crescendo. In April, a delegation of disgruntled Dutch nobles came to the regent Margaret to present a petition, and were treated dismissively (an advisor supposedly describing them at Geuzen or 'beggars', a name by which the malcontent nobility would come to be known going forward).

Writing to Philip in May 1566, Álava complained that great pleasure was to be found in France over the disorders in Flanders. The constable de Montmorency in particular was delighted. The duc de Bouillon was maintaining lines of communication into Flanders, and the prince de Porcien met with two Flemings every Monday. He indicated that they were appraising the duke of Cleves of developments.

The old constable de Montmorency supported his Protestant nephews drive to raise troops and fortify the border, as he enjoyed warm relations with the Dutch and German princes. Indeed, he had recently met with his Dutch relative, the baron of Montigny, who was the brother of the count of Horn one of the leaders of the Dutch troubles. The two men enjoyed a private four hour interview on 1 June 1566. Champion reports that among those present at Écouen to meet with Montigny was the Constable, his family, the admiral de Coligny, the queen of Navarre, and several other leading Protestant nobles. Montigny had then travelled on to the Spanish court, with the blessing of the young prince de Béarn (future king Henry IV). He had also entertained the ambassadors of the German princes of Hesse, Württemberg, and Cleves. In August, Charles would thank the constable de Montmorency for sending a gentleman to him to appraise him of developments in Flanders. Nevertheless, the constable de Montmorency did not favour a Spanish war, much to the disappointment of the Protestant leadership.

The French king was aware that various French Protestants wished to support the Geuzen. To this end they engaged in raids, with suspected support from England. Similarly, Protestants fled the other way into France to join with the prince de Condé. On 6 June 1566, Charles ordered that the baron de Colombières be arrested for his role in the raids.

The Spanish regent of the Netherlands, Margaret of Parma sent a letter of complaint concerning the actions of the comte de Montgommery, who she charged with having raised 500 arquebusiers in Normandy and raising armed ships to the end of making a landing in Zeeland. She further complained about the prince de Porcien, who she asserted was conducting reconnaissance on the Franco-Spanish northern border. Catherine dismissed the report as untrue, but the next day, her advisor Lanssac discussed the matter with Álava, something the latter would include in his diplomatic despatch of 1 July. Writing to his Spanish ambassador on 30 June, concerning a host of Spanish grievances that had been raised, Charles challenged the idea that the comte de Montgommery with 600 men had planned a raid against Antwerp from Normandy. Charles argued that such an enterprise would require ships, and all the ports were under watch. Another Spanish complaint voiced by Margaret of Parma concerned a certain Chavigny, allegedly a bastard son of the late king of Navarre, causing trouble in Antwerp. Charles noted that he desired the arrest of this man. A similar complaint about those entering Flanders to cause disorder was responded to with a request that these men be identified so that Charles might punish them. Finally, there was the matter of the actions of the prince de Porcien, who was supposedly causing havoc in Flanders. Charles refuted this allegation, arguing that Porcien was in fact hunting on his estates.

The prince de Porcien and duc de Bouillon were to be found in Antwerp in early July 1566, just before the opening of the council of Saint-Trond. At this council, the malcontent Dutch nobles formulated the petition they were planning to present the regent of the Netherlands, Margaret.

=== Open revolt ===
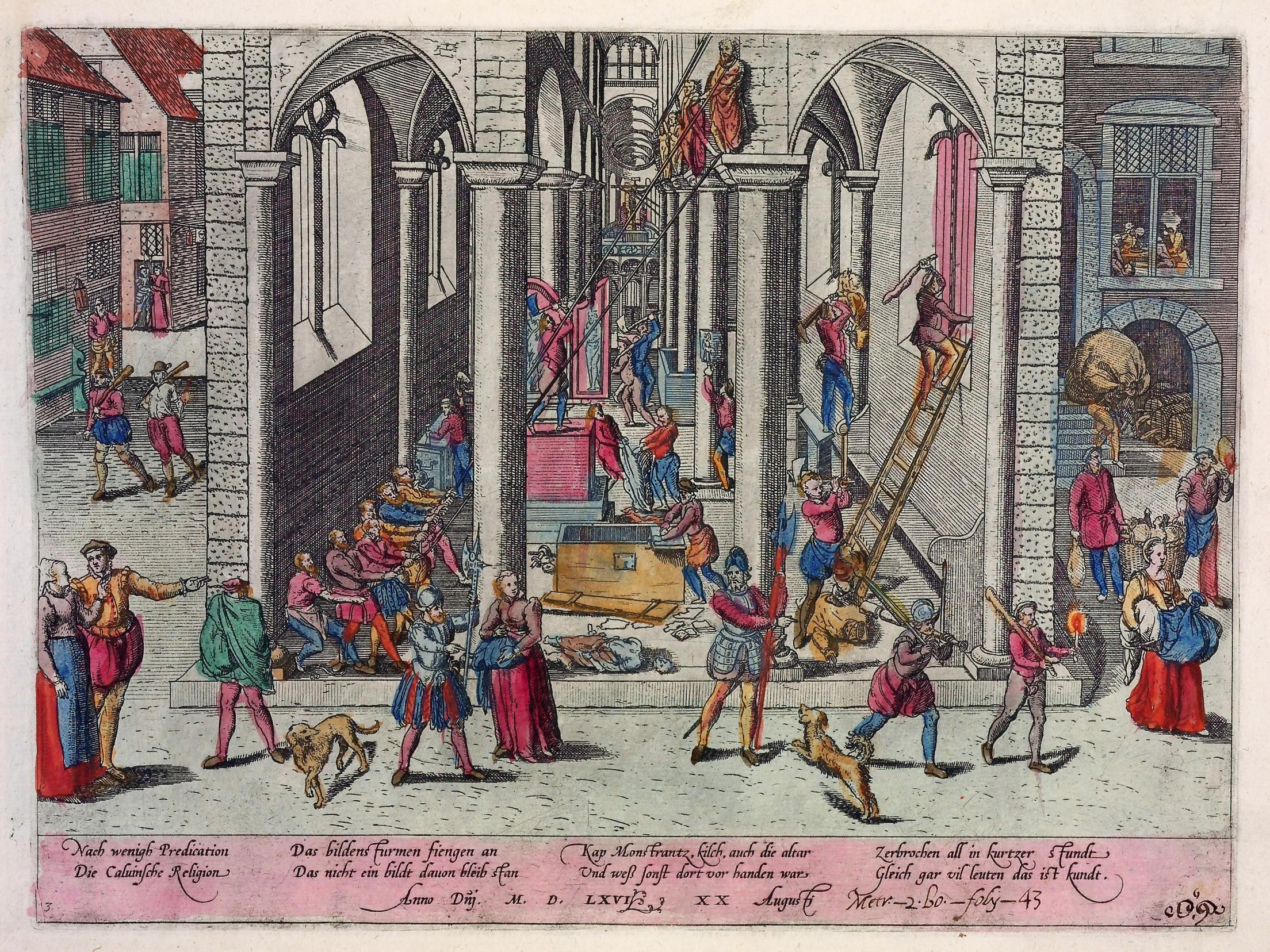
Iconoclastic Fury in the Netherlands

On 10 August 1566, an iconoclastic fury erupted in Flanders near Steenvoorde unleashed a wave of iconoclastic Protestant action and rebellion in the Spanish Netherlands. Churches were sacked, and Margaret presented with a petition seeking the establishment of freedom of religion. This revolt was led by the Dutch nobility.

The Spanish sovereign had initially taken a hands-off approach to the developing challenge to his authority in the Netherlands, leaving it to his ambassador, Álava and the governor of the province, his half-sister Margaret. He was otherwise occupied by anti-Ottoman action in the Mediterranean. As time wore on, the opposition to Philip's rule in the Netherlands had become increasingly radical and popular. Towns on the French border, and in the north slipped out of the control of the Spanish government for several months.

With the heating up situation in the Netherlands in mind, Catherine had hoped to inspect the border fortifications with Charles in July 1566. This was hotly protested by the Spanish ambassador Álava, who saw in such an effort the dark hand of the admiral de Coligny and prince de Condé, who were attempting to drive the French Protestants to arms in favour of their Dutch coreligionists. Catherine hoped to discourage French Protestants from supporting their Dutch counterparts in the Spanish Netherlands. Conflict with Spain was not in Catherine's interest. The leading war hawks in France were Protestants, and endorsing their position would upset the political balance. Further, Habsburg hegemony was such that France was in no position to challenge the Spanish in the 1560s in Europe. Similarly, the French crown feared that the troubles in the Netherlands might infect the province of Picardy. On 24 July, at the encouragement of the duke of Alba, it was declared that French subjects were not to be permitted to enter the Netherlands. Flemish refugees were also prohibited from emigrating to France.

The situation was nevertheless advantageous for Catherine and the French. They looked to translate the circumstances into more balanced or even French advantaged, relations between the two kingdoms. It was initially imagined that Philip would look to the French for support in handling the matter in the Netherlands, thereby putting the decision for the severity of action in French hands. Though this would not come to pass, the crisis still afforded benefit to Catherine. She noted that in the present circumstances, executing the promises she had made at the Bayonne conference (that she certainly remained committed to) was quite unfeasible. Further, she rebuked challenges to religious toleration, comparing the situation in France to that Philip faced with his Protestants in the Netherlands in a letter of 9 July 1566. Catherine advised Philip to take inspiration from the French approach.

Ties were initially slow in forming, the Dutch preferring to reach out to the Germans. This was a legacy of the conflicts of previous decades. In particular, during this period the prince of Orange would maintain strong connections with the German princes and the king of Denmark, but would have little in the way of connection with the leaders of the French Protestant party. Thus, it was his brother, the count of Nassau, who corresponded with the French. Despite this reticence at the highest level of the Dutch Protestant nobility, the French continued to reach out to their coreligionists. On 14 August, Beza had to decline a request from the prince de Porcien, that he [Beza] travel to the Netherlands himself. For Beza, such an enterprise risked jeopardising both the peace and the prospects of Protestantism in both countries.

Around August, according to the Spanish ambassador in France Álava, the prince de Condé and admiral de Coligny were already in league with the count palatine of Zweibrücken, with whom they were seeking to match contributions of troops for the cause in the Netherlands. Álava understood Condé to be stockpiling foodstuffs, and that saddlers were at work in Paris. The seigneur de Monluc, who was in contact with the Spanish, informed them that the admiral de Coligny was planning to surprise a Spanish army as it made passage through the Franche-Comté. According to English agents, various French captains travelled to the Netherlands in August.

The admiral de Coligny also kept his ear to the ground on developments in the Spanish Netherlands. To this end he met with the seigneur de Morvilliers and the seigneur de Sénarpont at Bresles in August. Catherine sharply rebuked the Admiral for undertaking this meeting. That same month, the various Protestant leaders converged on the capital to consider the path forwards.

On 18 August, Fourquevaux wrote to Charles about an audience he had undertaken with Philip at which he had offered French military support for the unfolding situation in the Spanish Netherlands. Though he did not state it, Philip considered the offer to be the least he could expect, given the military aid he had proffered France during its own troubles.

Frustrated with the Protestant military preparations in favour of their Dutch coreligionists, the French crown arrested the prince de Porcien in September 1566. Charles asked, on 27 September 1566, to be appraised of the information in the seigneur de Matignon's possession concerning the actions of the baron de Colombières with all possible haste.

With troubles enflaming the Spanish Netherlands, the duchess of Parma ordered the city of Valenciennes to receive a garrison under the command of a certain lord of Saint-Aldegonde. On 20 October the city refused to take their garrison. Therefore Saint-Aldegonde came to besiege the city in December. It came to pass that rumours developed of several hundred French subjects having made the trip to Valenciennes. This became known to Charles. He expressed scepticism at how this could have come to pass, given the prohibitions he had imposed and the vigilance of his border governors. He nevertheless felt it important to determine the veracity of the rumour, and if it turned out to be true, detain those French subjects in the city and deliver to them exemplary punishment. Charles was sure that the matter would have reached the Spanish sovereign's ears, and therefore advised the baron de Fourquevaux to keep his ear to the ground and respond to mention of the matter where the ambassador encountered it as advised by him. In a letter of 1 March 1567, to his ambassador in Spain, Charles hotly refuted the word that the French were supporting the rebellion of Valenciennes, which was then under Spanish siege. The city capitulated on 24 March 1567. Foreigners in the city, chiefly French deserters, were put to death. This was a policy Catherine approved of.

The Spanish ambassador, Francès de Álava ultimately felt that the French could not undertake any enterprise against the Netherlands due to their poor fiscal position. He voiced this to Philip in several letters, including one of 25 October 1566. This was despite Coligny's desire on this point, which Álava outlined in that same letter as being for the annexation of the Netherlands, with German support. Indeed, the Protestants of France were mobilising to this effect in his estimation.

In November, the admiral de Coligny and prince de Condé met with delegates representing the Protestant Imperial princes, the duke of Württemberg, the count palatine of Zweibrücken, and the elector Palatine of the Rhine. These delegates had travelled to France in an official capacity, seeking to secure payments of the debts owed to them by the French crown from their mercenary service in prior years. The Spanish ambassador became aware that a further offer had been made during the meeting, to put 5,000 infantry and 10,000 cavalrymen at the disposal of the French for the conquest of Flanders. Opposed to the meeting, he had extracted from Catherine a promise to arrest the representative of the elector Palatine, a certain Junius, however Catherine would not follow through, little desiring to throw the Germans into opposition. By the terms of this project, Charles would march into Valenciennes. The king could throw his lot in with this enterprise for the price of 200,000 écus. The constable de Montmorency was on board with this proposal, as were his Protestant nephews, believing Flanders would fall with ease into the king's hands should he but reach out to pluck it. Charles himself opposed it, wishing to maintain good relations with his brother-in-law the king of Spain. Catherine feared the might of Spanish power, and was also conscious of the fiscal straits the kingdom was in after the first civil war. She therefore opposed military adventure in the Netherlands. Catherine further imagined that in gratitude for Charles' failure to endorse the martial proposal, Philip would drop his opposition to a Habsburg bride for Charles.

Porcien continued to engage in provocative actions and was summoned to appear before the French court in November 1566.

The prince de Condé received entreaties from the city of Valenciennes in the form of an emissary by a man named Jehan de Lattre. He responded in kind, dispatching two representatives to Valenciennes, including his familiar the seigneur de Bouchavannes. Relations would continue in the utmost secrecy over the next few months, poorly documented as a result of their covert nature.

Rumour swirled in the Spanish court during December that the Flemish rebels were preparing to receive the support of 3,000 cavalry and 20,000 infantry, something Fourquevaux had to hotly refute.

Charles gave orders to the governor of Péronne, d'Humières, in December warning him against allowing Dutch subjects of the Spanish sovereign from selling their Picard lands without royal permission. D'Humières was advised that he would be held responsible for these acts if they continued. In the same month, d'Humières was advised that in the present circumstances where the security of the border towns hanged in the balance, his residency in his government was expected by the crown. He was to maintain a firm hand in preserving the royal edicts, so as to dissuade anyone looking to profit from the Dutch conflagration.

In March 1567, the comte de La Rochefoucauld visited Chantilly in search of Montmorency's support for an aggressive anti-Spanish policy. Montmorency categorically refused to support a war with Spain.

In April 1567, word circulated that the prince de Porcien and duc de Bouillon had escalated their involvement in the Netherlands to the sending of soldiers. More precisely, the dispatch of eight- or nine-hundred men to Hendrick van Brederode.

The Spanish agent, Guevara, reported on rumour in April that the prince de Condé intended to make for Flanders himself, putting himself at the head of an army of the Scots and Lutherans in support of the rebels. Further that a Lutheran of Germany, boasting 12,000 men intended to join with him. The Spanish agent, Guevara, received reports from the brother of the queen of Navarre's secretary that the Protestants intended to mobilise 200,000 men for the cause in Flanders. Meanwhile, the Bardaxí (southern Spanish spies and intermediaries) anticipated a Protestant uprising to inhibit the passage of the Spanish army into Flanders, with hostilities being launched that month.

Daussy speculates that the admiral de Coligny might have facilitated a loan of 500,000 écus taken in Paris by Charles de L'Escluze for the Dutch war effort.

According to an anonymous informant, Condé is supposed to have secretly travelled to the city of Mons in May 1567. Surrounded by only a few men, one of them was to have been a painter, who alternately died his beard one colour and then another each day. Daussy ultimately does not endorse or dismiss this account.

The French Protestant leaders hoped to drive Catherine into their camp by playing on her resentment for Spanish actions in Florida during 1565. In an extraordinary council of June 1567, Andelot renewed the offer of the prince de Condé (which he had transmitted through the seigneur de Bricquemault), of 3,000 Protestants to serve the king in an offensive relating to the Netherlands. These efforts were poorly received by Catherine, who was committed to a peaceable policy with Spain, and soured relations between the French Protestant leadership and the crown.

=== Spanish action ===
==== Philip's potential passage ====
The Spanish king, Philip II, entrusted the duke of Alba with crushing the revolt in the Netherlands and terrorising the Protestants. Alba enjoyed a vicious reputation among the Protestants. To this end the Spanish general was to march north along the eastern French border with an army brought up from Milan. For a time, the possibility of Philip himself making his way up to Brussels was considered. This was entirely disagreeable to Catherine, and she asked the French ambassador in Spain, the baron de Fourquevaux, to keep his ear to the ground to try and determine the veracity of this plan. Fourquevaux was exposed to a variety of contradictory rumours, and even with the help of the Spanish queen, Élisabeth, sister of the French king, was unable to make sense of the matter. With Philip's prospective action ambiguous, Catherine was keen to be assured that her daughter Élisabeth would not be left behind in Spain by Philip during any trip by him to the Netherlands. Philip assured her that Élisabeth would accompany him in such an eventuality. If Élisabeth did remain in Spain, it was the great French hope that she would enjoy the regency of the kingdom. The French desire for this had the effect of alienating Philip from the possibility.

Philip had little actual interest in making for Flanders, being feverish and his wife only recently coming off a difficult pregnancy. The possibility of it allowed for the cause of disquiet in France and served as a measure of Catherine.

The crown feared that the arrival of Philip might very well ignite a Catholic uprising in Provence. Therefore, on 11 September, the governor of Provence, the comte de Tende was advised by Charles that if Philip appeared on the coast of Provence or attempted to enter Marseille, he was to prohibit his entry. If Philip insisted, it would not be possible, given the relations between the two countries to stop his visit. In such an eventuality he should give 'dexterous orders' to ensure the tranquility of Marseille. The comte de Tende was not to snub Philip though. He was to honour him, but not go to see him himself, rather Tende should send an 'honest gentleman' to succour Philip with fruits and wines and other things he might desire.

In September, Charles wrote to the duc de Nemours, to discuss the possibility of Philip making close passage near to Lyon in a journey north. Nemours was to advise his lieutenants (Birague and Schomberg) on how to best protect Lyon in the event it came under threat. After the outbreak of the iconoclastic fury of August, the possibility of Philip's trip seemed increasing assured, and Fourquevaux was confident in it by October 1566. Meeting with the French king and his mother in October, Álava assured them Philip would make the trip in person, but stated nothing definite about Élisabeth besides noting it as a possibility.

As early as December 1566, Margaret had succeeded in restoring order in the Netherlands, nevertheless the ingredients for religious war still lay there, and Alba's march was still to go ahead. With the Spanish having received a bloody nose in the Netherlands, a show of force was still felt to be necessary to quiet those who gazed with hungry eyes on a weakened royal authority. Therefore, Philip announced in December that he would be travelling to the Netherlands personally, but that before his arrival he would be proceeded by an army under the command of the duke of Alba.

In discussions with the baron de Fourquevaux sometime before 9 December, the duke of Alba argued that the alliance between France and Spain meant that that each of them owed the other support in times of difficulty. Alba presented the possibility of a new meeting between the sovereigns. Fourquevaux retorted that there had always been, and would always be, a friendly attitude given such as required by the alliance of the two kingdoms. Éboli was more dexterous on matters of Franco-Spanish friendship, and throughout the first half of 1567, he regularly discussed the possibility of a meeting between Catherine and Philip. In his opinion such meetings should become second nature for the two kingdoms, taking place every year.

Catherine hoped through her anti-Flemish rebel position she might be able to prevent Philip and his army making the trip to the Netherlands. She also hoped to see the playing field of relations evened between Charles and Philip.

Up to the point that Alba left for his journey to the Spanish Netherlands, Fourquevaux imagined the voyage to the Netherlands might be a dissimulation. He rather believed Alba's army might be destined for Algiers. His conviction in this matter was a result of the fact that the situation had calmed in the Netherlands, and thus such a military show there was not necessary. Catherine was of much the same opinion around this time, and was alarmed by the continued preparations, as well as the southern movement towards Burgundy of two German companies of the duchess of Parma.

In June, Philip announced that his travel to the Netherlands, with some of the army's cavalry, would be taken by the sea route. Philip would in fact never make the trip to the Netherlands. In addition to his troubled health, his son don Carlos was having mental problems, and internal instability was growing inside Spain. News of Philip's supposed planned travel via sea was communicated to Catherine and Charles while they were staying in Chantilly around mid-July. Catherine inquired of him whether Élisabeth would accompany her husband for the journey, a query Álava did not answer. The French response to Philip's announcement was far more amenable than it had been to Alba's march. Catherine declared her satisfaction at Philip taking the sea route. Montmorency declared that if Philip stopped at a French port, the keys of the city would be provided to him, and he would be treated as were he the lord of the place. Both Catherine and Montmorency saw this as an obligation for the treatment of an allied sovereign. Álava was sceptical of the sincerity of the offer.

In August, the prospect of Philip's trip by sea again surfaced in rumours. On 1 August, Charles advised the lieutenant-general of Normandy, the seigneur de Matignon to provide all the support that might be required in this eventuality, and if Philip himself showed up in any of the ports that he be afforded every courtesy befitting an allied monarch.

Not long after the arrival of Alba in the Spanish Netherlands, it became apparent that Philip would not be joining with him.

==== Possible routes ====
There were several paths an army could take to reach the Netherlands from Spain, there was the sea route, which risked being preyed upon by French corsairs and was reliant on the good favour of the English; the route directly through France which relied on agreement of passage with the kingdom; and the old Spanish road, which would see the army land in Genoa or Nice, pass through the duchy of Savoy, and then trace the eastern border of France through territories under Spanish influence (Lorraine and the Franche-Comté).

In November 1566, Alba requested of Charles the right to lead his army through France itself in a modified version of the Spanish road route. He explained to Fourquevaux that Spanish recruits would head to Luxembourg, Naples, Sardinia and Sicily to replace the veterans stationed there. Several thousand troops would be pulled from Milan, and reiters raised in the Holy Roman Empire. The army would trace the French frontier through Savoy, the Franche-Comté and Lorraine. However, as it was winter, it would be impractical to cross the Alps. Therefore, Alba proposed that the troops arrive in Marseille or Toulon, then chart the path of the Rhône so that they might reach Franche-Comté. While they passed through French territory, they would be fed by the French. Fourquevaux responded to Alba that this would induce a Protestant uprising. Alba dismissed the notion, arguing the strength of the Spanish force present would mean such recourse would not be considered by the Protestants. Fourquevaux is to have inquired as to whether the Emperor could offer support to the Spanish. Alba explained that the German princes would understand the Flemish to be rebels, and even the Lutherans among them would be supportive. This did not sooth Fourquevaux, who wrote to Charles IX in concern that this whole eventuality might in fact be cover for a different purpose.

Writing to his own ambassador on 30 November, Philip expressed satisfaction at the attitude of Catherine and Charles on the matter of Flanders. He advised Álava to appraise Catherine that it would probably be necessary for some Spanish troops to make through French territory and also offer their services to Charles should he desire them, so that he might make himself obeyed among his subjects.

It was on 15 December, that Álava broached the sensitive matter of Spanish passage through French territory with Catherine and Charles. Catherine interrogated the ambassador on where the troops might land (Álava suggested Fréjus), and how long they would be in transit through France. She warned that while she had good will on the matter, such a passage would be liable to disturb the kingdom, not to mention expose the Spaniards to danger. Álava dismissed this, pointing out Spaniards had travelled far deeper into the kingdom during the first civil war, and Catherine responded by asking to have his request in writing, something the ambassador assented to. The Spanish Ambassador presented the carrot of a potential meeting between her and the king of Spain, something she had hoped to achieve at Bayonne years previous, but Catherine ignored him. Álava was told to expect a response, delivered via the seigneur de Saint-Sulpice that same day, but he would not get one. At royal council, only the maréchal de Bourdillon was to be found in favour of Spanish passage through France. Both the constable de Montmorency and the seigneur de L'Aubespine (chief among the French secretaries of state) spoke out against Philip coming through France. Concluding that his proposal had gone down poorly in the French royal council he wrote to Philip that his passage north was difficult for the French to stomach.

Charles informed Alba of his refusal to allow the Spanish passage through French lands, on the grounds the safety of his soldiers in lands filled with Protestants could not be guaranteed. Catherine did not wish to alienate her son-in-law, the king of Spain though, and the French would therefore supply the Spain army as it made its move northwards outside of French territory. Specifically, 6,000 bales of grain would be forwarded to Alba's army. The Protestants baulked at the thought of the crown feeding the Spanish army. The duke of Savoy and duc de Lorraine were more amiable to the Spanish, the latter likely receiving a visit from the Spanish agent Bernardino de Mendoza, and allowed Alba passage through their lands. Though he had afforded passage to the Spanish army, this did not mean the duc de Lorraine was blind to the dangers of the proximity of so many foreign troops. Along with the Swiss he assumed arms in case the Spanish decided to descend upon him.

==== Self-congratulation ====
As things calmed in the Netherlands, Charles congratulated himself in January on the effect of his influence in dampening the rebellion in the Spanish sovereign's lands.

Charles boasted on 31 January 1567 that a few days previous he had issued prohibitions on the receiving of any foreigners into France. In the king's opinion, this illustrated the value of the French in the Franco-Spanish relationship. In a February letter to the baron de Fourquevaux, Charles smugly noted that the Spanish now found themselves in the situation the French had in 1562, and if they fared better in battle than the French had during the first civil war they could consider themselves very fortunate.

==== Spanish accusation ====
While Catherine had enjoyed a window free of Spanish reproach, this terminated at the opening of 1567, when accusations began to be levelled, that despite French prohibitions on Flemish refugees being allowed to remain in France, their presence was in fact implicitly tolerated. This de facto tolerance was held up in opposition to the Spanish attitude during the French troubles of 1562-1563. In these troubles, had a Frenchman escaped across the border into Spanish territory, the ambassador affirmed they would have been hanged. The spokesman of Álava's who made this charge, travelled to Spain in February 1567 to repeat the accusation to Philip.

==== Defensive measures ====
The French crown already had several thousand Swiss soldiers in its employ, that were under the command of the duc d'Aumale in Champagne. Catherine ordered that these troops be put on alert.

With such a formidable force due to pass close to the kingdom, the French king Charles IX, sought the council of the prince de Condé and the young duc de Guise. Around 18 February, the court departed for Fontainebleau. Coligny and his brother d'Andelot returned to court in March, and looked to see 6,000 Swiss mercenaries and 10,000 French infantry raised as guard against the passage of the duke of Alba. These Swiss would be stationed in Burgundy. The duc d'Anjou and many companies of French men-at-arms were also to be dispatched to Burgundy. Condé meanwhile is to have proposed the raising of a force of 30,000 foot-soldiers and 8,000 horse for making a war against Spain. Crété argues the Protestant leadership were favourable to the hiring of soldiers in the hopes they might be used to support their coreligionists in the Netherlands.

According to Castelnau, Coligny warned Charles and Catherine that it was the ambition of the Spanish crown to see France ruined. Per the recommendation of the Protestants, Charles would arrange for the hiring of 6,000 Swiss soldiers, and 10,000 French infantry in case things turned south.

It would be the ambassador to the Swiss, Pomponne de Bellièvre who was tasked with securing these mercenaries. The Swiss cantons assented to the hiring, themselves concerned about Alba's plans. The captain of these 6,000 Swiss was a certain colonel Pfyffer. The final negotiations for their hiring were pushed through by Bellièvre in May 1567, so that the mercenaries might be immediately mustered.

Philip was immediately informed of the raising of these soldiers, with the reasoning given for their employ being that they were to protect the city of Lyon.

There was a particular fear that the Emperor might take advantage of a recent truce he had concluded, to descend upon the Three Bishoprics (Metz, Toul and Verdun) and seize them.

In addition to the raising of the Swiss were another 10,000 French soldiers, as per the recommendation of Coligny and d'Andelot. Philip II was appraised by Catherine of the hiring of the soldiers the crown had undertaken.

When the Spanish ambassador Álava learned of the hiring of these soldiers, he enjoyed a bitter meeting with Catherine on 3 July, during which the ambassador fumed that France had no need of the soldiers they had just hired. Catherine tasked the baron de Fourquevaux with justifying their employ to the Spanish court.

Contrary to the intended purpose of the raising of the Swiss, their recruitment, in conjunction with Alba's march, confirmed some Protestants' suspicions that back at the Bayonne meeting in 1565, a plot had been formulated by the Catholics tending towards their liquidation.

==== Further preventative measures ====
According to an English diplomatic report, the fortresses on the Picard frontier were fortified, as were those on the border with Luxembourg. Catherine was responsible for seeing the Picard fortresses supplemented. Fortification works also began at Verdun. Soldiers were dispatched to the Lyonnais and the maréchal de Vielleville made for the Lorraine strongpoint of Metz. Cloulas reports that in addition to reinforcements in the Three Bishoprics, were the provision of soldiers to the remaining French Piedmontese possessions as well as the Picard border. Haan affirms that the garrisons of Saluzzo in Piedmont were bolstered. Further, a possession of the cardinal de Lorraine, the town of Rambervillers was fortified.

In Béarn, the queen of Navarre mobilised forces. Champion reports that the Protestants dispatched 1,500 men-at-arms to Picardy during the summer of 1567.

On 20 February, the cantons of Bern, Freiburg and Valais concluded a defensive league in the face of the coming march. Basel and Zurich assumed arms with the approval of the French.

==== Alba's coming ====
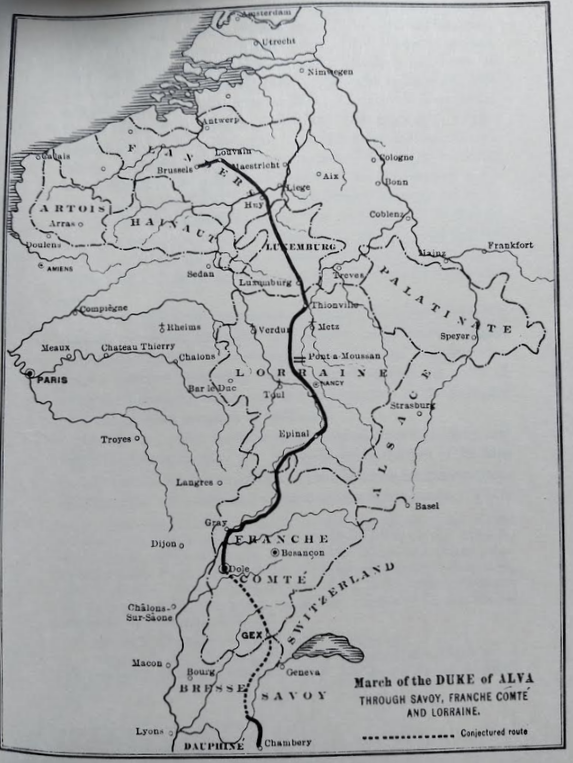
March of the duke of Alba along the Spanish Road to suppress the Dutch Protestants

Alba made his departure, with his army of 16,000 soldiers (hardened veterans that concerned even the Catholic duchies), from Cartagena on 10 May 1567. As his ships passed the Provençal ports, no customary salvos were given. He landed in Genoa on 27 May. His troops did not receive the supplies they had been promised after having landed on the continent, the French commanders in the border territories refusing to provide them.

He passed through the Mont Cenis of Savoy into Franche-Comté, and then Lorraine on route to Brussels. He maintained an iron discipline among his soldiers as he progressed, disallowing foraging for supplies. On route, his passage took him past Geneva. The Protestant city had put itself under heavy arms. Condé had proposed offering a Dauphinois garrison to the republic, but they did not feel the reinforcements were required.

As Alba made his way passed Burgundy, Charles wrote to the lieutenant-general of the province, the seigneur de Tavannes advising him on the precautions to take while Alba was near, and commending him on the order in which he maintained the province. To the king's confusion he had been informed that landsknechts were descending from Germany to link up with Alba's army. The Holy Roman Emperor, Maximilian II advised that any soldiers who wished to in Germany might go to join with the army of the Spanish king, but that none might join an army other than his. This puzzled the sovereign, who noted in a June letter to Fourquevaux that he could see no use for further augmenting of the Spanish army when the duchess of Parma had already restored peace in the Netherlands.

As the Spanish army made its way through Lorraine, it coincided with the Lorraine-Guise family's presence, having happened to be gathered in Lorraine around July to celebrate the baptism of the son of the duchess of Lorraine.

In July, Alba reached Luxembourg. With his arrival imminent, reports of mass conversions in Brussels from Protestantism to Catholicism filtered down.

Finally, on 22 August, Alba entered the Spanish Netherlands. His exhausted army arrived in Brussels.

On 8 September, in the Netherlands, Alba engineered two high profile arrests, that of the count of Horn and the count of Egmont. The arrest of these loyal nobles, provoked the resignation from the governorship of Margaret, a role that would be filled by the duke of Alba. Word of these developments reached Catherine on 16 September. According to Álava, Catherine summoned him, and informed him that in her opinion Alba should have engineered such a coup long ago and she would soon have news that would please the ambassador. This was a project of his own initiative, and created a strong impression in Paris according to the Spanish ambassador Álava. The ambassador stated popular opinion was in favour of the move, with people imagining the utility of having a figure like Alba in France for 20 days. Montmorency supposedly exclaimed in outrage that the Spanish intended to execute his two cousins.

Alba subsequently devoted himself to domestic repression in the Spanish Netherlands, no longer offering a threat to the French border.

==== Diplomacy with an army on the march ====
As the Spanish army made through the Franche-Comté, the Spanish ambassador Álava opined that, should Charles will it, the army could be used not only against the Protestants of the Netherlands but also those of France. Catherine categorically rejected the proposition of Spanish military intervention in France. After a long period of silence, Álava accepted the invitation of an interview with Catherine on 5 July. This meeting would play host to a lively discussion. Catherine assured Álava the rumours of war were false ones spread by the Protestants, and that she had nothing but friendship in mind for Spain. That said, in the circumstances, where Alba's soldiers forces were on the border of the French kingdom, precautions were prudent. Álava excused his recent absences on the grounds of his illness. The ambassador also needled the French crown concerning the publication of the Tridentine decrees, and the replacement of the cardinal de Châtillon in the French clergy. Catherine responded to this noting that Charles would act as was viewed necessary. Álava, scandalised, induced a fiery reaction from Catherine, who denounced the ambassador as seeking to impose himself on the French crown, as well as noting that Philip would find himself at the head of an army when he reached Flanders. Álava retorted that even if this were true, it was not a cause for concern. Indeed, the army could be at Charles disposal to bolster the Catholic faith in France. Catherine replied that each was master of their own house and did not require foreign aid in such matters. After this conversation, Montmorency showed Álava Chantilly. His nephew, Andelot, attempted to speak with Álava in Spanish, but the ambassador ignored him.

Around July, the Papal Nuncio intervened with Catherine. He praised the summoning of many leading French nobles to court as a worthy effort but deplored the thought some were counselling Catherine towards war with Spain. Catherine worked to sooth the Nuncio. She stated that their intentions were peaceable so long as the Spanish did not provoke a conflict. She complained of the Spanish silence in communication and explained the hiring of the Swiss as a necessity in that circumstance. The Nuncio dismissed the possibility the Spanish force, numbering 8,000 to 9,000 could pose a threat to France. Catherine rejoindered that this was not the total of the force and suggested numbers north of 30,000. The Papal representative concluded by hoping that the French fears proved to be unfounded.

==== Domestic confusion ====
Concurrently, it was in August, as Alba concluded his journey, that the Swiss mercenaries that had been hired for his passage entered France. Though he had passed, Catherine maintained the soldiers that had been raised for the period during which he marched by the border. The Protestants hoped to see the raised troops employed towards supporting their coreligionists in the Netherlands against the Spanish. Catherine's policy thus left them unsatisfied. It also generated confusion and concern as to why the Swiss remained in the crowns employ now that Alba had passed.

== Portugal ==
The vicomte de Poitou would be dispatched on a mission to Portugal around the end of 1566, his mission crossing over into 1567.

=== Funchal crisis ===
==== Goal ====
In 1566, a French naval expedition received the blessing of the admiral de Coligny. The expedition was under the charge of the seigneur de Monluc's son, the seigneur de Caupène. Caupène had first intended to undertake service against the king of Sweden, but was warned off this by Charles. He then turned his plans to the possibility of entering Spanish service, with his father, the seigneur de Monluc, writing a letter in his favour. In the wake of the destruction of French Florida by the Spanish, Charles wrote warnings to Caupène in July and August 1566. The ultimately target of the expedition would be the west African coast.

The historian Lestringant characterises the goal of the mission as being to assault Portuguese trading positions in West Africa, thereby allowing France to crack their commercial monopoly. He further notes a unanimity was emerging in France in reaction to the duopoly of the seas enjoyed by Spain and Portugal. Brunet argues by contrast that the expedition's goal was to undertake trade and discover new islands the Portuguese had written off as uninhabitable, such as Madagascar. Only the admiral de Coligny and seigneur de Monluc were in the loop as to Caupène's plans.

The historian Champion records a meeting between Caupène and the Spanish ambassador Álava prior to the mission's departure. Caupène is to have informed the ambassador that France was in internal peace, and Charles was poorly rewarding his servants. Therefore, Caupène, and other ambitious men desired to go out and conquer lands. He promised Álava that Spanish colonial possessions would not be attacked as part of this.

==== Departure ====
The flotilla of three well stocked French ships departed from Bordeaux on 23 August 1566. Travelling with Caupène were his brother, the seigneur de Montesquiou; the vicomtes d'Uza and Pompadour; several hundred nobles; and another few hundred soldiers. Crété puts the total numbers at 1,200 soldiers. The mission was a disaster. The expedition having stopped off in Madeira, where sailors disembarked to take on water. However, they were greeted by arquebus fire from Funchal in a misunderstanding. Aggrieved at this, the French nobles and soldiers launched an attack, and Funchal was sacked by the French. Many of the inhabitants were raped, and the inhabitants at large were massacred. During the fighting, the seigneur de Caupène received a wound from which he would die. Having seized Funchal, the French laid claim to the place.

==== Aftermath ====
The Portuguese reacted with considerable fury to this episode, expressing their desire to revenge themselves upon France and the French. Appraised of the French actions by the king of Portugal, Philip II lodged protest with Charles IX. Meanwhile, the French who had occupied Madeira returned to France. With the members of the expedition returning to France, they were put under arrest at the ports. The admiral de Coligny protested against this, arguing they had avenged the injury of the massacre in Florida, and moreover they had not started the quarrel in Funchal. He succeeded in convincing Charles that the action had avenged France. Monluc met secretly with them, curious concerning their vessels. Soon information arrived that the people of Funchal had instigated the combat.

According to d'Aubigné, the Spanish ambassador in France, Álava, argued that Caupène should be arrested, and those that had followed him to Funchal, executed. The expedition did not damage the standing of the seigneur de Monluc in Spain. Monluc had kept Spain in the loop as to the mission's objectives.

The French ambassador in Spain, the baron de Fourquevaux asserted that it was much the same as the Spanish actions in Florida. Brunet observes this to be an after-the-fact fiction, citing Caupène's alternate plans before settling on his expedition. Catherine took a less confrontational line, and offered her apologies to Philip. On 30 November, the baron de Fourquevaux reported that it was recognised in Spain by the less fervent, that the people of Funchal had brought their destruction on themselves.

After a few months, the arrested members of the expedition were released on the orders of the admiral de Coligny. Royal pardon was granted on 12 May 1567.

== Holy Roman Empire ==
=== Imperial relations ===
Justifying the edict of Amboise to emperor Ferdinand I in April 1563, through her ambassador the bishop of Rennes, Catherine argued that the French crown's goal by the peace was not to introduce diversity of religion into France, but rather to more achieve religious reunification by less destructive means than civil war. At this time, it was still possible to imagine the ongoing council of Trent might bring about such a triumph.

The bishop of Rennes would cease to represent France as ordinary ambassador to the Imperial court in 1564. He would be replaced by the seigneur de Landes who stayed in the charge until September 1567, around the outbreak of the Second French War of Religion.

On 25 July 1564, the Holy Roman Emperor Ferdinand I died. The seigneur de Lanssac was entrusted with expressing the condolences of Catherine and Charles on this news to his successor, Maximilian II.

The Emperor Maximilian II was frustrated at rumours that he was to join a Catholic alliance alongside the French and Spanish kings, and the pope. A book had been published alleging that the three Protestant Imperial electors were to be dispossessed and replaced by Maximilian's brothers. With outrage against this work in Germany, Maximilian was forced to denounce this work as a scurrilous fiction. He therefore had little appetite for the concept. Catherine had championed a similar proposal at the Bayonne conference.

In September 1567, the seigneur de Landes was succeeded as ordinary ambassador to the Holy Roman Emperor by the comte de Fiesque.

In a great contrast with the attitude of his Spanish cousin, Maximilian II presented a sympathetic face to the idea of religious tolerance in France. Indeed, this was how he had approached the religious question in his own territories. He informed the French ambassador to the Imperial court, the comte de Fiesque of his respect for the queen mother Catherine, and the way in which she had chosen to govern France. Through her efforts, he opined to Fiesque, she had assured peace and stability in the kingdom. However, there was one blot on this relationship. Maximilian charged the French representative to the Ottoman Empire with driving that state to arms against him. The comte de Fiesque hotly denied that such rumours were true, blaming the talk on malignant actors. In a letter of 1 Novembre 1567 to Catherine, Fiesque observed that the Emperor had alleged to him that the French ambassador in Constantinople was trying to sink peace efforts between the Ottomans and the Empire, and if they could not do so, to become party to the peace. Fiesque had denied that the French had any desire to make themselves party to a peace process that did not involve them.

The comte de Fiesque worked to reassure Maximilian on the merits of an alliance between Spain, France and the Empire, as well as downplay any French malfeasance relating to the Ottoman Empire. He appraised Charles of the developments of this conversation in December 1567. It was only through such a Catholic league could heresy be combatted, and peace assured. In relation to French policy regarding the Ottomans, Fiesque noted that he had informed Maximilian that he had been informed by Charles concerning the commission given to the French man in Constantinople. No part of the commission related to the injury of the Imperial cause. As for why the French had ambassadors with the Ottomans, this was a policy Charles wished to maintain continuity on from his predecessors, and it could be used to rescue Christians that had fallen into Ottoman captivity.

==== Three Bishoprics ====
===== Early efforts =====
The matter of French possession of the Three Bishoprics continued to represent a point of soreness between France and the Holy Roman Empire with the coming of peace in 1563. There were fears that the Holy Roman Emperor Ferdinand I intended to seize Metz. Around April 1563, the cardinal de Lorraine is to have intervened with the Emperor to impress upon him that the return of these places would allow them to serve as refuges for German and Luxembourgish heretics.

The baron Bolwiller, agent of the Emperor for the bailiwick of Haguenau revived in 1564 a proposal to take Metz from the French by surprise. Speed was of the essence if France was to be prevented from consolidating its hold over the territories. The Spanish king Philip favoured this proposal, offering 20,000 sous with a further 8,000 écus for the annual revenue of the territory. For Spain, the project offered the advantage of securing the Spanish Road (the military route the Spanish employed along France's eastern border), the Three Bishoprics laying as they did, between Franche-Comté and Luxembourg. It was proposed that the prince de Condé be employed for the enterprise, on the understanding he would betray the places to the Spanish. But the Spanish did not want to appear directly involved, hoping that the Emperor would take the lead.

This plan would not come to pass, the French government being on the watch.

===== Cardinal's war =====
In May 1565, the Emperor Maximilian affirmed his suzerainty over the Three Bishoprics. The cardinal de Lorraine (one time bishop of Metz) recognised the validity of his decree. Salzedo, a French loyalist in Metz, assumed the title of governor to combat the cardinal de Lorraine and made appeals to Charles IX. A quasi-war followed that the historian Thompson calls 'the cardinal's war'. Neither Maximilian nor Philip rallied to the cardinal de Lorraine's camp. Lorraine for his part worried too long a resistance would make his actions difficult to pardon. The full extent of Lorraine's treasonous contacts was not known at the French court, allowing leniency to be administered towards him.

In August 1565, Bolwiller renewed the plan, speaking to Chantonnay of a willingness in Metz to proffer 20,000 écus for the enterprise, and alleging that there were stores of arms in the city waiting. As before, speed was of the essence as the French were in the process of constructing a citadel. Some believed it prudent that emperor Maximilian come to terms with the Ottomans so that he might turn his attentions towards the Three Bishoprics.

Around May 1566, Álava would report that the king's ordinary guard had been dispersed to Toul, Verdun and Metz in case the Emperor reached an understanding with the Ottomans.

==== Habsburg match ====
In July 1564, the Holy Roman Emperor Ferdinand I died, and Lanssac was entrusted with expressing the sympathies of the French court to his son. He was also to work on the possibility of marriage between Charles' sister, Marguerite, and the son of the new Emperor Maximilian, Rudolf. Catherine had raised this idea with the duchess of Savoy back in June 1563 and previously sent out a mission to Maximilian which reported back to the French court in September with positive noises from Maximilian about the marriage of Marguerite and Rudolf, as well as that of Charles and a daughter of the new Emperor. The representative also brought a gold chain worth 400 écus back from the Emperor.

Departing from Avignon on 30 September, Lanssac arrived in Vienna on 9 November, but the new Emperor was not to be found there. He therefore made for Prague. These negotiations would yield no fruit. However, Maximilian would produce a handful of letters for the French king and his mother. Though these negotiations were meant to be secret, they became known to the Spanish ambassador in France, Álava.

The historian Champion reports on an alternate marriage proposal for Marguerite that was under consideration in 1564, to pair her with the prince of Florence. By the terms of this marriage, the duke would provide a large dowry, and the Pope (a Medici) would bring the comté d'Avignon to the match.

The Spanish sovereign would work to scupper any possibility of marriage between the French and the Austrian Habsburgs. In December 1565, he counselled Maximilian, his cousin, not to allow either of his daughters (Anna or Elisabeth) to become party to a French match. If a marriage was to take place between the Austrian Habsburgs and the Valois, it must be between Marguerite and the Emperor's son, Rudolf.

During 1566, a dual marriage prospect for Charles and his younger brother the duc d'Anjou was considered that paired them with Maximilian's daughters Anna and Elisabeth. This project was being pursued by the former French ambassador, the bishop of Rennes. Maximilian demanded that the French return the 'Three Bishoprics' to the Holy Roman Empire in return for this proposal going forward. This was unacceptable for the French.

The cardinal de Bourbon entreated with the Spanish ambassador Álava on the matter while the court was in Moulins during March 1566. Álava also spoke with the Portuguese ambassador to France, who was of the opinion Philip was seeking to sink the Charles-Elisabeth match to facilitate a marriage between Elisabeth and his own sovereign Sebastian. This was a less ideal prospect for the Portuguese Ambassador, who wanted Marguerite for Sebastian, so that the three kingdoms might be bound together. Álava responded to all this with some simple pleasantries concerning Philip's affection for both Portugal and France.

The negotiations were undertaken with thoroughness. In addition to the representative sent to Germany, feelers went out to the Italian peninsula in general and the pope/Florence in particular, and to the archbishop of Trier. Álava reported that it was anticipated in the French court that the marriage would cause problems for Philip's relations in Italy.

Álava enjoyed discussions with the duc de Nevers in April 1566 in which the prospect of the Elisabeth match was broached. Nevers informed the Ambassador that Catherine wished to discuss the marriage with him. For the French prince, the success of the project lay in the hands of Philip, and once he had facilitated it the 'Bayonne promise', to expel Protestant ministers from France, could be carried out. Álava was sceptical, noting that it must therefore mean doing so was already within their power.

Around September 1567, Catherine requested her daughter Élisabeth again work to convince Philip of the Charles-Anna match. She dismissed the Imperial demands concerning the Three Bishoprics, noting that France was not so desperate that France was not so desperate as to need to debase itself in such a fashion.

The new French ambassador to the Emperor, the comte de Fiesque would pick up the baton of the marriage proposals with Maximilian. The Emperor argued to Fiesque, that it was through no fault of his that the previous talks had fallen through. The French needed to withdraw from the Three Bishoprics and cease their connivances with the Ottomans. Fiesque, ignoring these objections highlighted the great glory that could accumulate in Maximilian's hands by having both the king of France and the king of Spain as his sons-in-law. He informed Catherine of these new talks he had enjoyed in October 1567.

Come December, Fiesque was fairly optimistic. He saw the main roadblock to Maximilian progressing with the match between Charles and the Emperor's second daughter Elisabeth as being the delays in the Spanish marriage negotiations concerning his elder daughter Anna. Maximilian was reportedly furious at the delays on this marriage, and would turn his attention to the French match only after this affair had been concluded. Charles maintained optimism on his relationship with Maximilian. The imprisonment of don Carlos in the opening weeks of 1568 changed the calculus somewhat for marriages, as it reduced the prospect of the Habsburg prince marrying. A few days after the imprisonment, Fourquevaux discussed the possibility of Charles marrying Anna with the prince of Éboli. In March 1568, Catherine wrote to Fourquevaux on her hope of the Imperial match for Charles.

The two marriages would finally be celebrated in 1570, Philip with Anna and Charles with Elisabeth.

=== German princes ===
The historian Daussy characterises Catherine's Imperial policy as multifaceted in this period. On the one hand she wished to neutralise the Protestant German princes who had shown support for the rebel Protestants during the first civil war. On the other, she wanted to ally with them in case of conflict with king Philip.

==== Saxony ====
The Imperial electoral title of Saxony had been contested since 1560 between the duke of Saxony, and the duke of Saxe-Gotha, his cousin. Hoping to put an end to the matter, in 1566, the duke of Saxony came to besiege Gotha, the place of his rival. Saxony was concerned that the French king might support his rival, as during the first French War of Religion Charles had recruited mercenaries from Saxe-Gotha's lands. On 25 February 1566, Saxony's ambassador, a certain Hubert Languet was sent to Charles to counsel him against supporting Saxe-Gotha. The latter was currently under the Imperial ban, and Charles was careful not to offer support to him. Despite this positive result, rumour spread in the winter of 1566 that Charles would support Saxe-Gotha. The German princes therefore sent two nobles to Charles to determine the veracity of this report. They arrived while the king was at Montceaux, and were received by the constable de Montmorency. Through Languet, Saxony sought to get a confirmation of neutrality from Charles. This was provided on 3 February 1567. Charles was not best pleased by the proximate relations between the duke of Saxony and the Holy Roman Emperor but nevertheless assured him no help for Saxe-Gotha would be forthcoming from France. Saxony entered Gotha on 13 April, and his rival was jailed.

During February 1566, at the suggestion of the Danish king, the prospect of marrying the duc d'Anjou to a daughter of the elector of Saxony, a Protestant, was floated. This was to the alarm of Álava, who, in conjunction with other anxieties he had about the young duc, feared that he might be planning to convert to Protestantism. It was around this time that the bishop of Rennes made his return from Germany to the French court, having been involved in marriage negotiations. Álava wrote to Philip on the matter of the Saxon match, hoping that this Protestant connection would prove to be compromising.

==== Württemberg ====
In the dying days of the first French War of Religion, in March 1563, the duke of Württemberg had been offered the position of lieutenant-general of the kingdom by Catherine in the hopes that he could be a useful figure of compromise, but he had declined. Appraised of the peace by the prince de Condé, the duke of Württemberg expressed his disappointment (to his mother-in-law Madeleine de Mailly) that the opportunity had not been seized to establish the Augsburg Confession in France. In the absence of this confession, he felt things would deteriorate for the French Protestants. Had the Protestants adopted Lutheranism, it would surely be agreeable enough to the Catholics that total freedom of worship might have been granted to them. Madeleine replied to offer her thanks for his 'good admonitions' and desire to see Protestantism flourish in France but made no mention of the Augsburg confession.

==== Hesse ====
The landgrave of Hesse, who had served as an ally to the rebel Protestants during the first civil war, died on 31 March 1567. His lands were divided among his four sons, with the lion's share (referred to as Hesse-Kassel) going to his eldest William. Unlike his father, William was not keen to proffer military aid to the French Protestants, though he remained sympathetic in a peaceable sense to the French Protestants. The French crown had also secured William as a pensionary at the start of 1567, with the margrave receiving 4,000 florins annually.

=== Extraordinary diplomatic missions ===
In the summer of 1563, Gaspard de Schomberg was dispatched to the Holy Roman Empire on an extraordinary diplomatic mission to deal with the German princes. In the same season, Philibert du Croc was sent as an extraordinary ambassador to the Empire.

The baron de Ruffec would be entrusted with a mission to the German princes during 1567. More concretely, the princes would play host to the baron de Luxe in the summer of 1567.

==== Lux and Rambouillet's mission ====
In the hopes of frustrating any future possibility for Protestant hiring of German mercenaries, the baron de Luxe and the seigneur de Rambouillet were entrusted with convincing the Imperial princes against proffering their services as mercenaries. This mission transpired in April 1564, after the constable de Montmorency had been informed that some sought the renewal of conflict in France and had secretly hired captains for this purpose. The envoys were to stress Charles' continued adherence to the policy of friendship his father and grandfather had borne the German princes. If the moment was fortuitous, Charles hoped to meet with the duke of Württemberg, archbishop of Trier and the Elector Palatine during his passage through Lorraine, so that he might honour these grandees. They were to communicate to the duke of Saxony Charles' regret concerning the war between Denmark and Sweden, and to inform him the French ambassador to Denmark, Dançay was looking to mediate this quarrel. Finally, they would communicate the recent treaty negotiated with England.

==== Lorraine and Saint-Gelais' mission ====
The Spanish ambassador Álava wrote to Philip II on 20 July 1565 concerning a diplomatic mission into the Empire being conducted by the secretary of the cardinal de Lorraine, and Guy de Saint-Gelais. The official purpose of the mission was to meet with the marquis of Brandenburg to discuss the agreement recently reached at Bayonne. They intended to tour the Protestant princes of the Empire, stopping first in Trier. The two ambassadors would then part, with Saint-Gelais making for the Emperor, and the secretary to the duke of Württemberg. After Württemberg, he would go on to the son of the Elector Palatine, John Casimir. Of chief importance would be the meeting with the margrave of Brandenburg-Ansbach whom they were to advise to cause disruption at an opportune moment. He would possess letters for the Elector of Saxony and king of Denmark but would not see them delivered until after the meetings with Brandenburg-Ansbach and John Casimir. The expedition was carried out on a highly limited budget.

From January to May 1567, a French royal diplomatic effort sought to establish bonds with the Protestant princes of the Holy Roman Empire that might serve as a counterweight to a Spanish Catholic League. Thus, representatives travelled to Heidelberg, Kassel, and Stuttgart. These efforts were met favourably, and a conference was held at Maulbronn in July. However, civil war would resume in France before fruits of this effort could be sampled.

==== Clearing the mercenaries ====
It had been agreed that those German mercenaries hired during the first French War of Religion (specifically those of the son of the Elector Palatine) would be paid off by the French crown. Come 1567, these troops were still stationed in Burgundy. In April, John Casimir, outlined new demands. He increased his monetary request beyond that which had initially been settled with him at Orléans. Exasperated, Charles requested of his lieutenant-general for the province of Burgundy, that he make the mercenaries leave the kingdom. If the mercenaries would not listen to reason, then by military pressure. He suggested that he raise a military force and closely shadow the Germans in such a way as they would be compelled to depart from the kingdom.

=== Parallel Protestant diplomacy ===
The French Protestants also conducted diplomatic relations with the German Protestant princes external to that of the French crown. This concerned both immediate priorities and longer-term strategic objectives.

In May 1563, Condé entrusted a certain Jean Sturm with securing an extension for the repayment of 100,000 florins that had been advanced to the rebel Protestants during the civil war by his German allies.

==== Alliance with France ====
On a larger scale, Condé also hoped to see the Protestant princes of the Empire enter into an alliance with the French crown, as they had during the Italian Wars in the Schmalkaldic League. He saw potential for this advancing the cause of Protestantism in France. In May, he charged his mother-in-law, Madeleine de Mailly, who happened to be in Strasbourg, with conducting a diplomatic tour of many of the principal Protestant princes of the Empire: the duke of Württemberg, the landgrave of Hesse, the Count Palatine, and the duke of Zweibrücken. Madeleine met with Zweibrücken on 5 May, then made for Heidelberg where she met with the landgrave of Hesse and the Count Palatine on 20 May. Finally, she made for Bruchsal where she met with the duke of Württemberg and the margrave of Baden-Baden.

The discussions with Württemberg proved particularly fruitful. A memorandum would be drawn up on the basis of the meeting. It expressed the Duke's desire for how Condé should best conduct himself at the French court to advantage Protestantism. The conversion of the royal family to Protestantism was envisioned, idolatry would be eliminated, and Calvinism and Lutheranism brought into harmony. Daussy sees these proposals as representing a fundamental misunderstanding of the situation in France. A new colloquy of Poissy, such as that which would be required to bring Calvinism and Lutheranism together, was not on the cards. Württemberg also showed an overly optimistic understanding of Condé's power at court.

Concurrent to Madeleine's mission, the seigneur d'Esternay was sent out to the various Protestant princes who had supported the French Protestants during the civil war to offer their thanks.

Condé sent out new feelers for his alliance project in June. He enjoyed the support of Catherine in this. The royal secretary, Millet, took possession of his instructions concerning the mission on 4 June. He would be received by the Count Palatine at Heidelberg. The negotiations he conducted accomplished nothing.

==== Pressure on the crown ====
By 1564, the goal had changed. Rather than a Franco-German alliance, the hope was to see the dispatch of an embassy to the French court that might plead the case of the French Protestants before the king. The admiral de Coligny, and his brother the seigneur d'Andelot sent a certain Chastelier-Portault to the Empire in June 1564. He was to visit the duke of Württemberg, the Count Palatine, and the landgrave of Hesse. His mission bore no fruit. Condé took up this mantle in December 1564, dispatching a seigneur de La Fontaine to the above princes to complain of the various violations of the edict of Amboise that France was bearing witness to.

The impact of this was not immediate, but at a conference in Ladenburg held in March 1565, it was resolved to send a legation to Charles IX. A harangue would be delivered before the French king on 28 March, representing the count palatine of the Rhine, the duke of Württemberg, the margrave of Baden-Baden, the landgrave of Hesse and the duke of Zweibrücken. In this harangue, they argued for affording religious freedom to the French Protestants. The king's response to this petition is unknown. A letter was also provided to the emissary to give to Condé in which the German princes renewed their support for him but also reminded him of the debt of 100,000 florins he owed them. Daussy argues the recouping of this money was the prince's prime concern.

A new mission to the Germans in May 1565 saw Chastelier-Portault sent into the Empire once more. He was to visit the usual princes so that he might explain to them the deteriorating situation for the French Protestants, and the apprehension about the forthcoming Bayonne Conference. A new intervention with Charles by the German princes was requested, but this would not come to pass.

In January 1566, Condé and Coligny jointly sent the seigneur de La Fontaine to their German allies. This was not only to secure the embassy that Chastelier-Portault had failed to receive, but also to arrange a Calvinist-Lutheran colloquy. The hope with this was that it might enable French and German Protestants to present a unified voice. This proposal was received favourably. It was also reinforced by the sending of Chastelier-Portault in August 1566 on the initiative of Coligny and Andelot. After these repeated interventions, the German princes again resolved to send ambassadors to France, as they had done in 1564. The representatives were jointly chosen by Württemberg, Zweibrücken, Hesse, the Count Palatine and Baden-Baden. On 12 August Johann Junius, a man of the Elector Palatine, and David Lauck, departed from Strasbourg for France. They bore two letters dated 10 August. One was for Condé, again demanding the payment of the money they had forwarded in 1562. Condé could only reply to this one with embarrassment. The second was for Charles and plead with him to strictly enforce the edict of Amboise. Coligny, who had also received a letter, emulated Condé in an embarrassed response, worrying that they appeared to be ungrateful for their German allies.

Charles received this petition dimly on 3 November. While he assured the German princes of his friendship, he informed them they had been led astray as to the position of Protestantism in France, noting that the edict of Amboise was already well applied. He expressed his frustration with his Protestant subjects that they had turned to someone other than him to raise their concerns.

== Switzerland ==
=== Ambassadors ===
Orbais would serve as the French ambassador to the Grey League (at Chur) from 1563 to 1564. He would simultaneously represent France with the Old Swiss Confederacy (at Solothurn) from 1563 to 1565. The Grey League occupied a vulnerable position, exposed to Spanish attack.

Orbais would be succeeded with the Grey League by his colleague from the 1563 negotiations, Bellièvre, who would hold the charge until October 1565. The new ambassador worked to counteract Spanish influence among the League, achieving great success by May 1564. This was aided by the fact that the Chief Magistrate of the League was a French pensioner. The Grey League thus offered a renewed alliance to France, with the matter of details to be left until later. Later, the Spanish would win over the Grey League by the commercial opportunities it presented. Bellièvre would then go on to represent France with the Old Swiss Confederacy from March 1566.

In January 1566, the baron de Semblançay was appointed as ordinary ambassador to the Swiss leagues, but he would never be sent to the country, the appointment being reconsidered at the last moment. It would be a certain Pierre de Grantrye who assumed the responsibility of ordinary ambassador to the Grey League, after the departure of Bellièvre.

=== Renewal of the alliance ===
Only ten days after the signing of the edict of Amboise that brought the first French War of Religion to a close, Charles sent two representatives (Bellièvre and the abbot d'Orbais) to the Swiss Leagues so that they might negotiate the renewal of the Swiss alliance with France, the deadline for which was near approaching. Through this alliance, in both times of civil and foreign war, the French crown could count on the raising of infantry regiments. This was an alliance that had last been established by king Henri II. Charles, though conscious the renewal of the alliance would require some expenditure, was inclined to be miserly in the matter, and advised Orbais/Bellièvre to spend only on those liable to yield effective results for the relationship.

An embassy, comprising the bishop of Limoges and maréchal de Vielleville was entrusted in 1564 with travelling to Geneva where they were to join with de Beza, and the French ambassador to the Cantons, Bellièvre, so that they might head to the Protestant cantons. Charles IX was keen to see the Protestant cantons joined into the treaty with France, but this was opposed by Heinrich Bullinger who adhered to the policy of Huldrych Zwingli that rejected Swiss mercenary service. Bullinger's objection was on the grounds that the cantons would be obliged to proffer their support regardless of the morality of the French king's cause, if the call came for soldiers. The men were to promise the early payment of French debts owed the Swiss for past military service. Beza assured them he would undertake interventions with Bullinger. Zurich, Bern, Schaffhausen and Basel hoped to see a clause inserted into the treaty with the French king by which he promised to strictly abide by the terms he had agreed in the edict of Amboise. Limoges, and Vielleville were little keen to adopt this clause. In the diet of Baden, which transpired in August, it would be the old 1549 treaty which was presented for the cantons. Vielleville and L'Aubespine toured Bern, Zurich and Schaffhausen hoping to overcome their opposition.

As they travelled, the ambassadors were besieged with requests for the payment of pensions and other debts owed to the Swiss by the French crown, including those for military service in the prior civil war. At Fribourg, in October 1564, Vielleville and Limoges announced firmly that they would not support the addition of this new clause into the treaty. Their efforts were supported by the admiral de Coligny, who wrote to Bern on 31 October, urging them to trust in the king's word, and not require the insertion of the clause. He noted that if they expressed the sentiments of the clause verbally to the king this could be just as effective as it being a component of the treaty. D'Andelot wrote to Bern and Zurich on the same matter. Encouraged by the successes of his colleagues in Fribourg, Bellièvre headed for Glarus in the hopes of overcoming the Zurich preachers and settling relations between the cantons of Glarus and Schwyz. He succeeded in convincing the two cantons to accept a uniform treaty but needed to hear from his colleagues before the deal could be sealed.

Coligny again reached out to the resistant cantons on 9 November. On the admiral's initiative, the Protestant pastor of Orléans reached out to Bullinger beseeching him to make accord with the French king. This stance, which seemed at odds with their religious affiliation, could be explained by the fear that the Swiss cantons might instead turn to Spain or the pope for an alliance should the talks with France fall through. Despite this multiplicity of efforts, Bern and Zurich refused to enter into the treaty. These cantons excepted, the other cantons would assent to renew the alliance at Fribourg on 2 December 1564. Decrue credits the alliance treaty they were able to establish to the Swiss colonel of Lucerne, a certain Pfyffer.

Summoning the Spanish ambassador Álava, shortly after the conclusion of the alliance. Catherine took a hostile turn. Skipping the usual pleasantries, she complained to Álava that the Spanish had tried to obstruct the renewal of the Franco-Swiss alliance. Specifically, the figures of Sancho de Londoño and the count of Anquisola. Charles jumped in, noting that both he and his mother had been accused of being Protestants. This kind of behaviour was contrary to the Franco-Spanish alliance. Álava stated he knew the two men in question and was astonished they would have acted in such a way. Catherine suggested jealousy of the grandeur of the kingdom of France might be at play. Álava bristled at this, and amended his position concerning Londoño and Anquisola, saying that the French must be mistaken in their accusations as they were good knights.

This partial success was somewhat soured when, the following year, the Catholic cantons entered into an alliance with the Papacy, thereby holding to multiple alliances simultaneously.

==== Debts ====
France continued to try and hold out on its debts to the Swiss, much to the annoyance of the cantons of Glarus, Lucerne, Schwyz, Appenzell, Valais, the Grey League, Schaffhausen, and Basel.

=== Interventions in France ===
A commissioner from Bern met with the admiral de Coligny while he was at Moulins in early 1566. They declared that Catherine had secured the good friendship of the Swiss through enforcing the edict of Amboise. This aroused the umbrage of the constable de Montmorency, who found it inappropriate for the representative to speak on such a subject. Nevertheless, the Bernese representative was afforded a gold chain worth 1,300 écus.

The duc de Nemours had cause to complain to the council of Geneva in May 1566 when he became aware of a plot to assassinate himself, and the cardinal de Lorraine, both of whom were in nearby Annecy at this time. The council protested its innocence to the duc de Nemours, but undertook an investigation nevertheless. This investigation came to the door of the seigneur de Mauvans, who admitted frankly that he had told a certain individual of the merits of killing the cardinal de Lorraine. He denied having made similar threats against the duc de Nemours and further denied that he had commissioned the man to actually carry out the deed. The council reported on this confession to the duc de Nemours, before letting Mauvans off with a warning to be more discreet in future.

Later that year, another man, of the name Boudier, approached one of the syndics of Geneva with the plan of seizing the citadel of Lyon (which had been established by the French crown to secure the fairly Protestant city). Assuming him to be a double agent trying to compromise Geneva, the man was tried and condemned to death.

=== Protestant alliance ===
Anticipating the possibility of future Catholic aggression, the admiral de Coligny, with the support of his brother the seigneur d'Andelot, began formulating a transnational military strategy in March 1567. Kingdon is less charitable in interpretation, arguing that it indicated the Protestants were preparing for a fight months before the surprise of Meaux. A war chest of 240,000 écus which had been set aside would be deposited at low interest rates with three reliable allies (Geneva, Bern, and the Palatinate) at a low interest rate. 50,000 would go to each of Geneva and Bern while the Palatinate would be given the rest to hold. In the event of a purely religious war, these sums would be activated and could be used to quickly finance troop levies that would be devoted to the attacked party. The seigneur de Vézines was tasked with pitching this proposal to Geneva and Bern. He arrived before Geneva on 2 April. A secret council, composed of four syndics and de Beza, was assembled to consider the proposal at the instigation of de Beza. The syndics would enjoy supreme judicial authority in Geneva for the following year. It returned a negative assessment on 6 April. The argument against it was that holding such a large sum would be challenging in such uncertain times. If Geneva was attacked, such money would be devoted to the defence of the city, thus making repayment of the sum with interest difficult. Nor could Geneva commit itself to an alliance without negotiations having transpired with all concerned parties. The Genevans would request the provision of 300 infantry and fifty cavalry be provided given the present difficulties. The French Protestants responded favourably to this entreaty. On 13 April, the seigneur de Mauvans made his entry into Geneva. Mauvans had a history of conspiring against the French crown, and had on prior occasions caused awkwardness for Geneva by his presence (he having lived in Geneva since 1564, though making a departure from Geneva in early 1567, Kingdon suspects to liaise with Coligny). He announced the imminent arrival of three-hundred arquebusiers funded by the church of Dauphiné, with the possibility of a further seven hundred, also at the expense of the French Protestant church. Ten officers were acquired from around Metz, and the new garrison was put under the nominal command of a Genevan magistrate, but Mauvans held practical command.

==== Alba's passage ====
Indeed, at this moment, with Alba's army due to pass close by Geneva on its path north, there were fears of a siege in Geneva. Loans to Geneva from the Protestant church of Lyon were undertaken in three instalments in 1567: February, March and April.

Soon, the number of volunteers arriving (the French garrison peaked at seven hundred) had reached such heights that the city council had to impose limits on them. Geneva had a certain hesitancy about the support it was being offered. With success in their arranging of loans, the thought of accepting more money from the French, especially when the French loans came with strings attached, was unappealing. In June, the admiral de Coligny offered to come in person, at the head of a troop of 1,200 men. His brother Andelot sent a donation of 2,000 écus for the defence of Geneva. These offers of support, like those of Bern to provide a garrison for the city, were declined. A larger garrison would be financially ruinous to maintain, and would moreover mean more foreign soldiers in Geneva. A certain refugee French noble, the sieur de Clervans made out a loan to Geneva on 18 June. The Protestant church of Montpellier offered to send a boatmen to support in the cities defence, an offer that was politely declined on the grounds that any danger to Geneva was not liable to be water based. Despite these displays of solidarity, the defence pact Coligny had envisioned did not go any further.

The Spanish took the opportunity of their close passage by Switzerland to extract advantages from the cantons at France's expense. Cheap salt from the Franche-Comté was offered to the western cantons, and grain from the Milanais for the central ones. The duc de Lorraine likewise participated in this effort. This left Bern isolated among western Switzerland. Geneva's sole defender. The duke of Savoy exploited Bern's weakness to enforce compliance with the treaty of Lausanne to see three bailiwicks handed over to him. Charles IX advised Bern to yield on this point, and the settlement was conducted in August.

By July, it was clear that Geneva was not going to be attacked by Alba. The Genevan council took steps to demobilise. Mauvans was ordered to dismiss his French garrison, and he would soon be back in France himself.

== Italy ==
Hoping to break through the status quo of Spanish domination in Italy, Charles looked to find friends in the peninsula. The king had dynastic ties with the Este family which he hoped to utilise, as well as the Medici through his mother. Difficulty was to be found in fostering these relationships due the rivalry among the Italian princes.

=== Savoy ===
In the first months of 1564, the baron de Fontenilles was sent to the duchy of Savoy on an extraordinary diplomatic mission.

In 1566, the French court would involve itself in the treaty of Lausanne, which had been established between the duchy of Savoy and the canton of Bern in 1564. By the terms of this agreement, Bern withdrew from the Chablais, Gex, Ternier, and Gaillard, which it had been occupying. Before the Bernese would depart, the ratification of both the French and Spanish was required. The duc de Nemours participated in this process on behalf of the duke of Savoy.

==== Duc de Nemours ====
The treaty of Cateau-Cambrésis restored the duke of Savoy to his lands, which had been under French occupation. The restored duke left in place the subordinate apanage of the Genevois in the hands of the duc de Nemours, his cousin. According to the contemporary seigneur de Brantôme, the cousins enjoyed close relations. Even if relations were not as warm as Brantôme imagined, the historian Vester highlights there were strategic reasons to leave Nemours' apanage in peace, as the duke of Savoy could not necessarily count on the loyalty of his trans-alpine subjects.

Nemours secured a pension of 14,400 livres, permission to prosecute those who were indebted to him without possibility of their appealing outside the territory, and the ability to verify pardons. In February 1563, the duke of Savoy conceded that his subjects inside the Genevois did not need to provide information of their revenues and lands to Chambéry (where his ducal court then was).

In 1563, the duke of Savoy transferred the chief residence of the Savoyard dynasty from Chambéry to Turin. Vester suggests that this might have been to put more distance between the duke, and his French cousin. Nemours for his part had contempt for the Savoyard court, viewing it as insignificant in comparison with the great large courts.

In June 1563, the duc de Nemours asserted further rights. He wished to appoint to benefices that were vacant, create nobles, and to enjoy supreme jurisdiction inside the apanage. The duke of Savoy responded by proposing they arrange a meeting to discuss these rights in the neutral territory of Bourg-en-Bresse. Nemours appointed a président (senior judge) of the Parlement of Dijon, and the lieutenant-general of the Forez for the role. These deputies went above and beyond what had previously been claimed, arguing for half of the Savoyard lands, disputing the primogeniture nature of the inheritance, and the meagre lands Nemours had been granted. In their estimation, the eldest Savoyard son was rightly in line for just the principality of Piedmont, while the other lands and the ducal title went to the younger son. With no agreement forthcoming, the conference terminated on 4 September. Parisian lawyers advised the duc de Nemours he was arguing on shaky ground, and to attempt a different tact.

Agreement was made in 1564 between Nemours and Savoy concerning certain fiscal elements of the apanage. A new tax that was being raised would see its revenues funnelled to the duke of Savoy, rather than Nemours. Savoy would maintain a moderate revenue stream from his Genevois subjects, to ensure a line of his authority even in a period where he could not assert it stringently.

While the duke and duchess of Savoy were in Lyon meeting the French court, Nemours again struck up a correspondence with his cousins, which would continue into the Autumn. Nemours' pleaded his case, noting how diminutive his lands were, while the duke of Savoy enjoyed such expansive grandeur. In August, new negotiations were begun, featuring the future chancellor of France René de Birague as a mediator. The mediators rejected the division of the Savoyard lands, but noted that the apanage granted to the junior line should match the "quality and grandeur of the house". Nemours would follow this line, and his request for an augmented apanage was granted.

Come 12 September, Nemours received an expansion of his Savoyard pension from 6,000 écus to 8,000. These would be drawn from various taxes and grants of both the Genevois and Faucigny, but Nemours would not enjoy the revenue streams themselves. The duc de Nemours, despite receiving an expansion to his pension, would exceed the revenue draw offered to him by the duke of Savoy.

In December 1564, the duc de Nemours saw the comté de Genevois erected into a duché in his favour. He gained the right to grant fiefs, if not ennoble; to torture prisoners; exclusion from legal fees concerning the Savoyard senate; and the right to collect emoluments for pardons he issued. New lands were also offered him, those of Poncin and Cerdon which connected Geneva and Lyon. Looking for who to credit for Nemours' success, Vester turns to the powerful backing Nemours enjoyed from the French court, specifically the queen mother Catherine.

=== Mantua ===
Mantua would enjoy the presence of an extraordinary ambassador in the form of a certain Hippolyte Galvagna in the summer of 1564. Mantua was again the subject of French attentions around the start of 1566, with the dispatch of du Ferrier to the place.

=== Venice ===
==== Diplomatic representation ====
At the time of the coming of peace, France was represented in the Venetian Republic by a certain seigneur de Boistaillé. Boistaillé would hold this office until he was replaced by Arnaud du Ferrier in March 1564. In June 1567, Arnaud du Ferrier was succeeded as ambassador to Venice by Paul de Foix.

Venice would play host to the seigneur de Rambouillet in the spring of 1565, the ambassador also visiting Florence and Rome.

==== Competition for Venetian friendship ====
Since 1513, the French had enjoyed the strongest of their relationships in the Italian peninsula with the republic of Venice. The only hesitation for Venice, was that in the event they were subject to an Ottoman attack, they could not count on the French for support. The minority of Charles IX was therefore a concern to the Venetians. The Spanish were working hard among the Catholic princes of Italy to discredit the French, arguing they were in league with the Protestants. The edicts of pacification that Charles had issued were presented sinisterly. By this means, the Spanish succeeded in winning the friendship of the Venetians, to the vexation of the French.

==== Loss of prestige ====
In the reports of the Venetian ambassadors to France of 1564, authored by Marc-Antoino Barbaroa, the kingdom of France was depicted as having decidedly fallen in status. Justice was confused, the people of the kingdom fractious and rebellious, and the nobility consumed by passions. Protestant heresy was at the root of France's decline in his estimation. Barbaro would be replaced as ambassador by Giovanni Correro in 1566, and he would write up his views on the state of France a little while later in 1569. He saw Catherine as being politically boxed in for fear of displeasing the Protestants. For the Venetian ambassadors the solution was simple, execute five or six of the leading great Protestant nobles.

While at Fontainebleau in early 1567, Charles showed off the royal weaponry for the Venetian ambassador, before passing him over to the cardinal de Bourbon to show the ambassador the library.

=== Ferrara ===
A certain seigneur de Cérisolles was dispatched on a mission to both Ferrara and the Papacy in the summer of 1563. The seigneur de Saint-Héran conducted an extraordinary diplomatic mission to Ferrara in the opening months of 1567.

=== Florence ===
The seigneur de Rambouillet would come to Florence for an extraordinary diplomatic mission in the spring of 1565 that would also take him to Rome and Venice.

=== Papacy ===
==== Ambassadorial missions ====
In March 1563, the seigneur de L'Isle made his departure from the Papacy where he had been serving as the French representative. The French crown had desired to install Paul de Foix in the post to replace him; however, the pope refused to receive the choice, suspecting him of being a Protestant. The bishop of Dax received the nod to assume the charge of French representative in the Papal States in September 1563. He would instead retire to Venice. He had been summoned to appear in the Papacy by a bull of April 1563, and therefore feared his arrest. The Papacy had shown itself unwilling to receive his ambassadorship. Until the arrival of the seigneur d'Oisel in February 1564, the cardinal de La Bourdaisière would represent France at the Papal court.

The death of Oisel in 1566 saw the provisional elevation of his one of his servants to the charge until such time as a successor could be appointed. The names of the individuals who bridged the gap are unknown.

In the instructions given to Oisel's successor, the comte de Tournon in July 1566, the ambassador was encouraged to jealously guard French precedence in the Papacy over Spain. To this end he must ensure his presence at all assemblies and ceremonies where diplomats would be present. He was to be on the lookout for Spanish plots and schemes to frustrate French precedence. If his precedence was threatened, he was to follow the example of Oisel, and take his leave from the Papal court. Tournon had previously been appointed ambassador to the papacy in 1562, but had not taken up the charge at this time. He would remain in the office until 1568.

In the summer of 1563, the seigneur de Cérisolles conducted an extraordinary diplomatic mission to the Papacy (also visited Ferrara as part of his mission). The seigneur de Villeroy would be sent as an extraordinary ambassador to Rome in the spring of 1564. A further mission was undertaken by the seigneur de Rambouillet to Rome as part of a broader offensive that also saw visits to Venice and Florence.

==== Pope Pius V ====
During the pontificate of pope Pius IV, the French had been accustomed to a degree of flexibility from the Papacy. Under his successor pope Pius V, elected on 7 January 1566, a more rigid pontificate would present itself to the French crown. His election was a cause of some dismay to the French court, which was then in Moulins. Pius was quick to register with the French his opposition to the edict of Amboise. Pius' advice to Charles was to work towards its erosion so that Catholicism might be 'restored'. In addition to this, he expressed his disapproval at word he had received that Protestants who had fled from Savoy had found refuge in Lyon, and those from Piedmont had found refuge in French Saluzzo. The Birague brothers, who respectively governed these two places were implicated by the pope as heretics. Oisel disputed these accusations, arguing that the governor of the Lyonnais, the président de Birague had in fact expelled a Protestant minister, Viret from Lyon. He thus felt it was dubious that Birague would have accepted a troop of Protestant refugees into Lyon, as he was a man of good character and faith.

Charles would not have installed him in such a charge if his Catholicity was in doubt, therefore he urged the pope to put little stock in these rumours. The pope rejoindered that he was indeed satisfied that Birague was a good man, but that it was not possible to be too firm in such a matter, where the possibility of reducing the number of enemies of the faith was concerned. As for Saluzzo, this place was governed by the seigneur de Ottobiano (another member of the Birague family). Oisel argued that he had governed with Catholic wisdom. It was admitted that a fleeing Protestant could take refuge without the cognisance of the place's governor. Given the times in which they lived, it was sufficient for such refugees to know they did not enjoy support of ministers rather than to actively persecute them.

Not long to his pontificate, in February 1566, the new pope urged the French to link up with other Christian princes in a crusade against the Ottoman Empire. Oisel responded to this proposal in careful and general terms. Oisel urged the pope to do well by king Charles to best draw him towards this holy resolution. Upon taking his leave of the pope, Oisel noted that Pius V was crying, and that his admonitions were 'tender'.

The pope also cautioned Charles against allowing the accumulation of many benefices in a single pair of hands. If such pluralism was tolerated, the benefice holder could not properly tend to all their flocks.

==== New nuncio ====
As concerned the replacement of cardinal Santacroce as Papal Nuncio to France, Catherine had little enthusiasm for the bishop of Terracina who had been sent to replace him in October 1565. In her estimation, the bishop was of insufficient quality for such a high office. This was to the surprise of the pope, who insisted this figure be accepted. Oisel argued that Pius should look to a more qualified individual to replace Terracina. In Oisel's estimation, Terracina was little respected by the Italians, and his choice as Nuncio made it appear as though the pope placed little importance in his relationship with France. To this charge, Pius retorted that one of Oisel's predecessors as ambassador to the Papacy, (the seigneur du Mortier) had been a Protestant, but that nevertheless, Pius had tolerated him. Oisel bristled at the accusation of heresy against one of his predecessors. In a letter of November 1565 to the queen mother, the ambassador opined that if Catherine remained firm in her opposition to Terracina, Pius would relent and select another candidate for the position. With the death of Pius IV, it would be on his successor Pius V, who had ascended to the pontificate on 7 January 1566 to replace him. Until such time as the replacement, the bishop of Ceneda could arrive, Pius V asked in February 1566 that Catherine receive Terracina, for the honour of the Papacy. Terracina would be relieved of his charge in April 1566.

In the instructions given to the new Papal Nuncio, several policies were prescribed for the bishop of Ceneda, these were learned of by Oisel through the cardinal of Ferrara and the cardinal Santacroce and he subsequently informed Charles by letter of 1 April 1566. The new Nuncio was to ensure Charles always remained true to the Catholic faith. To see to the publication of the Tridentine decrees in France. To ensure that appointments for bishoprics and abbeys were given to those whose Catholic faith could not be doubted. Most importantly, to strip the cardinal de Châtillon of his dignity as cardinal, as the pope had already done so.

Fourquevaux, French ambassador to Spain, related to Charles a conversation he had enjoyed with the Papal Nuncio to Spain on 10 October 1567, shortly after the outbreak of civil war in France. He outlined how he had proposed the pope convene a council of learned men, that he undertake a tour of Christendom, and reform the clergy.

==== Patronage ====
Oisel wrote with concern about the departure of the Papal nuncio to France, cardinal Santacroce. He observed that Charles had not afforded him anything upon his departure. He held up the example of the Holy Roman Emperor, who had granted the cardinal Delfino a 'large bishopric'. This was important, as Santacroce's bishopric was a French one, and Charles should foster the devotion of his cardinals. Ultimately, Santacroce would receive his gratification through receipt of the archbishopric of Arles, which was taken from the cardinal of Ferrara for this purpose. Ferrara was wealthy enough that he could take the hit.

In terms of broader patronage, for want of money, French pensions to various cardinals were often in arrears. Likewise, Oisel had to advocate for , who had been in French service since the reign of Henri II. Without a pension, and unpaid for his role as gentilhomme de la chambre du roi (gentleman of the king's chamber, a ceremonial office), Santa Fiore was considering moving into Venetian service. It was important to maintain him, as he was well liked, and one of the few captains in the peninsula. Similarly, Oisel advised that the king must do well by the Rucellai banking family, whose loyalty to France was as great as that of a Frenchman in his estimation. Another target of Oisel's advocacy, this time to Catherine, was a certain Leonardo della Rovere, who he stated had performed good services in support of the French crown.

== Ottomans ==
=== Relationship history ===
During the reigns of Francis I and Henri II, France had enjoyed a friendship with the Ottoman Empire. In an age of Habsburg domination, friendship with the Ottomans was a valuable counterweight for the French crown. The Ottoman navy had supported the French as their own navy. Upon the accession of Charles IX, French diplomats responsible for the Levant urged for a renewal of the friendship between the "Most Christian King" and the sultan.

The Spanish king Philip gave the appearance of being scandalised by the French relationship with the Ottomans.

The Ottomans had been unnerved by the treaty of Cateau-Cambrésis, which appeared to offer the spectre of a Franco-Spanish alliance. Nevertheless, the French continued to place great stock in their relationship with the Ottomans. Abandoning the relationship with the Ottomans would allow the Genoese and Spanish to walk into the void, turning the force that had once been an asset for France into a cause of injury. Such an eventuality would also be a damage to French trade. The relationship was always a valuable asset if relations ever broke down with Spain.

Yet, as noted by the French agent in Constantinople in December 1563, for the last four years, the French had failed to provide an ambassador for their relations with the Ottoman Empire.

=== Ambassadorial presence ===
The French would be represented in the Ottoman Empire from 1561 to November 1565, not by an ambassador but rather by a 'resident agent', the seigneur de Norroy. Norroy was a great believer in the Franco-Ottoman alliance, seeing it as a restraining tool on France's neighbours from assaulting the country, and by November 1564 his correspondence urged Catherine and Charles to dispatch a full ambassador to Constantinople bearing gifts. The replacement for this representative had been selected by December 1565, but had not yet departed for the Ottoman Empire. Opinions of France in the Empire were at this time sour.

=== Haci Murad's mission ===
Haci Murad, a Polish nobleman in Ottoman service, was entrusted with serving as the diplomatic envoy to France in 1565. He landed in Marseille, with a host of attendants, and the French consul of Algiers to escort him. He would take a meandering route to link up with the French court (outside Bayonne). He linked up with the vicomte de Joyeuse, and in a meandering journey passed through Narbonne, then Toulouse, Bordeaux, and Dax on route. At Narbonne he was received by the baron de Fourquevaux, In Toulouse he was welcomed by the cardinal d'Armagnac with honours. Armagnac found his conversations with Murad pleasant, the two bonding over shared ground in their devotion to god. The various notables and students of Toulouse attempted to secure meetings with the Ottoman representative while he was in their city. A Danish ambassador to Spain was forced to vacate his residence to make room for the Ottoman representative at one place on the journey.

It had initially been intended that Charles would meet with Murad at Bordeaux but the two missed each other, thus their meeting was to occur at the potentially awkward confluence of a parallel meeting the French were undertaking with the Spanish at Bayonne. Murad had to be kept separate from this other meeting, but he would stay with the court for several weeks, and Charles dined with the Ottoman delegation at a monastery.

=== Protestant parallel diplomacy ===
In the same period, Coligny undertook negotiations with the Ottoman Empire. The historian Crété believes this might have been towards the end of a commercial treaty or maritime alliance. To the end of these discussions, Coligny dispatched his protégé, Téligny and another Protestant noble to Constantinople in the autumn of 1566. They were unable to meet with the sultan Suleiman as he had recently departed from the capital for Szeged, where he would die. The nature of Coligny's mission was a mystery even to Charles IX. He inquired of Téligny and his compatriot in April 1567 whether they had gone to acquire the sultan's support for the French Protestant cause, whether there was a plot tending to the disadvantage of the king of Spain with the Protestants of Flanders, and finally if he was cognisant of secret Protestant war preparations. Coligny denied both the first and second points raised by the king, and to the third noted that he understood no one to be arming, but if someone was arming to the detriment of the Protestants, they would respond in kind.

=== Fighting and supporting the Ottomans ===
In the spring of 1563, the Spanish held town of Oran in North Africa was put under siege by the regency of Algiers, an Ottoman subject. In the opinion of the Spanish ambassador to France, Chantonnay, French arms, powder and supplies daily crossed the Mediterranean to support the besiegers. In consequence of this suspicion, many French ships, docked in Catalonia, were seized. This was done on the grounds that they might be undertaking trade with Barbary pirates.

Champion records that around February/March 1565, the comte de Brissac warned the Spanish ambassador Álava that a powerful Ottoman fleet was expected. He assured him that Philip could count on the support of several thousand Frenchmen in this eventuality. Álava retorted that Philip was not afraid of the Ottomans and would not readily employ Frenchmen.

With the Ottoman Empire undertaking a siege of Malta during 1565, determined to stamp out the refuge of the Knights Hospitaller, various French nobles rallied to the defence of the island. This enterprise was led by the comte de Brissac, son of the late maréchal de Brissac and Filippo di Piero Strozzi, son of the late maréchal de Strozzi. In total this force comprised around 300 nobles, and 800 soldiers. By the time this force arrived in Malta, the siege had already been lifted. False rumour swirled that the Ottomans intended to return to Malta. Great state led efforts had been made by various Christian princes (including the Spanish crown and the Florentines) in favour of the besieged. The official French position opposed the expeditionary force of their subjects. They were denied recognition by the crown. The French position was an embarrassing one, the Grand Master of the Hospitaller knights, as well as many of his knights, being French subjects. Nevertheless, the military aid provided to Malta, in addition to fiscal aid towards the Knights Hospitaller, aroused the discontent of the Ottoman Empire. Around the end of 1565, Catherine undertook firm efforts to appease the sultan. The expedition of Brissac and Strozzi was condemned, and its participants banished. This banishment was more for appearances and had the actual goal of securing their return.

In discussion with Álava in early 1566, Catherine noted her desire to maintain the Ottoman alliance, and that she had ordered the adventurers to return. Charles intervened, querying his mother as to why she would say such a thing. He noted he would like to see all the Ottomans drown at sea.

In May 1566, the young duc de Guise and other young nobles, including Gaspard de Schomberg, the comte de Brissac, Strozzi and Guy de Saint-Gelais were looking to fight the Ottomans in Hungary. These men had originally travelled to Malta to fight the Ottomans there, but the Ottomans not being present there, they travelled to Hungary, after stopping on route in Italy. The young duc de Guise's Uncle, the cardinal de Lorraine, was the instigator of this enterprise by which the French nobles joined with the Imperial war effort. Guise, his brother, and a retinue of 350 men, would serve under the command of their uncle, the duke of Ferrara. The French crown attempted unsuccessfully to frustrate their mission through declaring them to be rebels. Efforts were also made, through the French Venetian and Papal ambassadors, to hinder their passage. The men would fight in Hungary regardless.

With the threat of a new siege of Malta in 1566, those in favour of military action in its defence let it be known that king Charles approved of the mission. This is at least, what they had informed the duke of Alcalá, Spanish viceroy of Naples, while they were in Messina.

On the excuse that the French intended to use them to support the 'Moors', the Portuguese seized two French vessels in early 1567.

The French were considered to be the instigators of aggressive Ottoman actions both in the Mediterranean and in Hungary by the Habsburgs. In May 1567, Philip purported to have information that Charles had requested an Ottoman fleet action during the summer.

=== Crisis in the relationship ===
==== Nasi ====
A banker of the name Joseph Nasi proved a point of contention between France and the Ottoman Empire. Nasi was close to the heart of the Ottoman government and was owed significant sums of money either from loans he had proffered to Henri II, or from confiscations undertaken after his emigration to the Ottoman Empire. Envoys were sent in pursuit of these debts in 1562, 1563, and 1565. Their presence in France was more in service of maintaining diplomatic channels that seriously achieving satisfaction for Nasi. The 1563 mission was terminated after it became clear that France was too consumed by civil war to address the matter. In January 1564, Suleiman wrote to Charles explaining that he of course understood in the present circumstances the resolution of the Nasi affair had been an impossibility, but that when France was stable, the money should be paid. The 1565 mission was led by Haci Murad, but similarly resolved nothing. Haci Murad would again serve as an envoy to France in 1567 around the time of the battle of Saint-Denis.

During 1566, Catherine dispatched Guillaume de Grandchamp de Grantrie to the Ottoman Empire with a proposal for the establishment of a buffer-state in Moldova that could accommodate resettled French and German Protestants. Having arrived in Constantinople, he exceeded his mandate, proposing to the sultan that he himself be established as the Voivode of Moldova. He would marry the sister of the Voivode of Wallachia, and pay an annual tribute of 20,000 ducats to the sultan. He secured the backing of the banker Nasi for this scheme in exchange for offering him satisfaction of his debts through the confiscating of French goods from ships entering and leaving Alexandria. This unauthorised proposal subsequently caused problems.

==== Huma ====
A certain woman named Huma, whose daughters had been kidnapped by the Grand Prior of the order of Malta in 1557, and subsequently become ladies-in-waiting to Catherine, sought the return of her now-Christianised daughters. The sultan at first demurred on this campaign, with the seigneur de Norroy noting in February 1564, that the daughter in question had long been married, and had converted to Christianity, thus there was no reason to demand their return. This was disputed by an Ottoman envoy to France. Huma emphasised the young age of her daughters, the impossibility of their marriage, and the women's desire to return to living a Muslim life. She secured influential supporters for her position, including that of Sokollu Mehmed Pasha, and his wife, a daughter of the sultan. The matter thus became a useful counter to French requests for the release of those in Ottoman captivity, such as during the Cicala and don Alvero negotiations. Huma's campaign benefitted from a time of strain in the Franco-Ottoman alliance, when the Ottomans were far more interested in French friendship in 1569, her campaign was afforded little official interest.

==== Cicala ====
During the last years of the seigneur de Norroy's residency, he attempted to negotiate the release of a Sicilian pirate known as the viscount of Cicala from Ottoman captivity. Despite receiving assurances from a Semiz Ali Pasha that he would do everything he could to affect the release, in November 1564 Norroy reported back to Charles that the sultan could not abide the man's release due to the depredations he had caused. Further, it was a paternal affection for Charles to not release the man, as a free Cicala would be injurious to both the Ottomans and the French. Shortly after this, the viscount died in captivity.

== Denmark and Sweden ==
=== Commercial mission ===
In April 1564, the admiral de Coligny looked to dispatch some ships into the North Sea for the purpose of commerce. Catherine wrote to him on 17 April that she would have her son the king write supportive letters to the king's of Denmark and Sweden. She was not altogether optimistic on this point due to the war that currently pitted those two kingdoms against one another. It does not appear that this project materialised, and it is next and last seen in a letter of the admiral de Coligny to the king of Denmark in April 1565.

=== Dano-Swedish war ===
The Danish king, Frederick II had requested the provision of around six 'good vessels' that would travel into the conflict zone, and without militarily participating, provide a suitable intimidation to bring the Swedish sovereign to the table. France had been unable to fulfil this request when it was made due to the war with England. The French ambassador Dançay apologised to Frederick, that it was not for lack of desire to do so that the French denied him support.

In 1564, Charles, eager to reassert French diplomatic prestige, sought for his ambassador in Denmark, the seigneur de Dançay, to act as a reconciliatory force in the conflict between Sweden and Denmark. There was fear that the conflict between the two kingdoms might spread into the Holy Roman Empire and ignite a broader war. While Charles wanted Dançay to avoid taking a side, the relationship with the Danish king was the more important one to France. Denmark could provide naval support for France against the English and also possessed relationships with the Protestant German princes that were useful to the French. In addition to apologising for the French inability to engage in gunboat diplomacy in the present circumstances, Dançay was to work to protect French commercial interests to trade as they pleased in the Baltic Sea. This was to defy the objections of the Swedish king, Erik XIV, who had forbidden French ships from trading with Russia on the grounds that they could get the goods they desired from Reval (modern day Tallinn). The negotiations between the two sovereigns that Dançay was to conduct would take place in Sweden in Charles' estimation.

Dançay returned to Denmark in July 1565 and set about working on the problem. He looked to solve the issue of the war directly by establishing lines of contact between the two sovereigns. His approach seemed to be working, and the two parties appeared to be in agreement by September 1566. They were due to meet one another at Falkenberg in that same November. Charles congratulated his ambassador for his diplomatic success, but this proved premature. The negotiations at Falkenberg were a failure.

Charles was aware of French captains who were offering their military services to the Swedish sovereign. He forbade them to undertake their mission, noting to the Danish king that the only mission he sanctioned was one of a merchant of Dieppe. The Holy Roman Emperor, Maximilian II was keen to reassert Imperial arbitration for the conflict, little enthused for French intrusions into Scandinavian affairs. He proposed a conference in Stralsund for 16 March 1567.^{β} Both Denmark and Sweden assented to this proposal. Dançay urged Charles to write to all parties so that the French could reclaim the initiative. Dançay was sure that the Emperor had sabotaged the negotiations at Falkenberg for his own selfish ends. Acknowledging the diplomatic failures in a dispatch of 26 February 1567, the ambassador feared a new Swedish offensive. The Emperor's men arrived at Stralsund in May 1567, where they were joined by the Danes. Dançay was absent, but more importantly the Swedes also failed to show for the mediation, sinking any prospects of reconciliation.

== Notes ==
^α Lhoumeau mistakenly places this diplomatic mission in February 1563, however he notes that it was shortly followed by the treaty of Troyes, which occurred in April 1564, and more recent scholarship confirms this meeting in fact occurred in 1564. ^β Labourdette records this as being 16 March 1566, but this does not make sense given it was a response to the failure of the Falkenberg conference, which took place in November 1566.

== Sources ==
- Babelon, Jean-Pierre (2009). Henri IV. Fayard.
- Biloghi, Dominique (1998). "Le Monde au Temps des Guerres de Religion". In Jouanna, Arlette; Boucher, Jacqueline; Biloghi, Dominique; Le Thiec, Guy (eds.). Histoire et Dictionnaire des Guerres de Religion.
- Brunet, Serge (2017). «De l'Espagnol dedans le Ventre!»: Les Catholiques du Sud-Ouest de La France face à La Réforme (vers 1540–1589) Tome 1. Honoré Champion.
- Carpi, Olivia (2012). Les Guerres de Religion (1559-1598): Un Conflit Franco-Français. Ellipses.
- Carroll, Stuart (2011). Martyrs and Murderers: The Guise Family and the Making of Europe. Oxford University Press.
- Champion, Pierre (1937). Catherine de Médicis présente à Charles IX son Royaume (1564-1566). Grasset.
- Champion, Pierre (1938). Paris sous les Derniers Valois - Paris au Temps des Guerres de Religion:Fin du Règne de Henri II, Régence de Catherine de Médicis, Charles IX. Calmann-Lévy.
- Champion, Pierre (1939). Charles IX: La France et le Controle de l'Espagne (Tome 1). Grasset.
- Champion, Pierre (1941). La Jeunesse de Henri III (1551 – 1571). Grasset.
- Chevallier, Pierre (1985). Henri III: Roi Shakespearien. Fayard.
- Cloulas, Ivan (1979). Catherine de Médicis. Fayard.
- Constant, Jean-Marie (1984). Les Guise. Hachette.
- Crété, Liliane (1985). Coligny. Fayard.
- Daussy, Hugues (2015). Le Parti Huguenot: Chronique d'une Désillusion (1557-1572). Droz.
- Decrue, Francis (1889). Anne, Duc de Montmorency: Connétable et Pair de France sous les Rois Henri II, François II et Charles IX. E. Plon, Nourrit et Cie.
- Duvauchelle, Christine (2023). "Lettre de Charles IX au baron Fourquevaux, ambassadeur de France en Espagne". Les Guerres de Religion 1559-1610: La Haine des Clans. In Fine Éditions d'art.
- Édouard, Sylvène (2009). Le Corps d'une Reine: Histoire Singulière d'Élisabeth de Valois (1546-1568). Presses Universitaires de Rennes.
- Gellard, Matthieu (2014). Une Reine Épistolaire: Lettres et Pouvoir au Temps de Catherine de Médicis. Classiques Garnier.
- Haan, Bertrand (2011). L'Amitié Entre Princes: Une Alliance Franco-Espagnole au Temps des Guerres de Religion (1560-1570). Presses Universitaires de France.
- Heap, William A. (2019). Elizabeth's French Wars: 1562-1598. Unicorn.
- Joblin, Alain (2023). Henri III: Un Roi de Tragédie. Ellipses.
- Jouanna, Arlette (1989). Le Devoir de révolte: La noblesse française et la gestation de l'Etat moderne 1559-1661. Fayard.
- Jouanna, Arlette (1998). "Le Temps des Guerres de Religion en France (1559-1598)". In Jouanna, Arlette; Boucher, Jacqueline; Biloghi, Dominique; Le Thiec, Guy (eds.). Histoire et Dictionnaire des Guerres de Religion.
- Kingdon, Robert M. (1967). Geneva and the French Protestant Movement 1564-1572: A Contribution to the History of Congreationalism, Presbyterianism, and Calvinist Resistance Theory. Librairie Droz.
- Knecht, Robert (1996). The Rise and Fall of Renaissance France. Fontana Press.
- Knecht, Robert (2000). The French Civil Wars. Longman.
- Knecht, Robert (2014). Catherine de' Medici. Routledge.
- Knecht, Robert (2016). Hero or Tyrant? Henry III, King of France, 1574-1589. Routledge.
- Labourdette, Jean François (2013). Charles IX et la Puissance Espagnole: Diplomatie et Guerres Civiles (1563–1574). Honoré Champion.
- Labourdette, Jean François (2018). Charles IX, un Roi dans la Tourmente des Guerres Civiles (1560 – 1574). Honoré Champion.
- Le Roux, Nicolas (2000). La Faveur du Roi: Mignons et Courtisans au Temps des Derniers Valois. Champ Vallon.
- Le Roux, Nicolas (2022). 1559-1629 Les Guerres de Religion. Gallimard.
- Le Roux, Nicolas (2023). "Les Protestants, le Roi et la Ligue: Les Guerres de Religion dans la France du Nord". In Le Roux, Nicolas (ed.). Les Guerres de Religion: Une Histoire de l'Europe au XVIe Siècle. Passés Composés.
- Lestringant, Frank (2004). Le Huguenot et Le Sauvage: L'Amérique et La Controverse Coloniale, en France, au Temps des Guerres de Religion. Droz.
- Lestringant, Frank (2023). "Colonies Françaises au Nouveau Monde (1555–1580)". Les Guerres de Religion 1559-1610: La Haine des Clans. In Fine Éditions d'art.
- Lhoumeau, Charles Sauzé de (1940). Un Fils Naturel de François Ier: Louis de Saint-Gelais, baron de la Mothe-Saint-Héray. Société Française d'Imprimerie et de Librairie.
- Mariéjol, Jean H. (1983). La Réforme, la Ligue, l'Édit de Nantes. Tallandier.
- Marnef, Guido (1999). "The Dynamics of Reformed Religious Militancy: The Netherlands 1566–1585". In Benedict, Philip; Marnef, Guido; Nierop, Henk van; Venard, Marc (eds.). Reformation, Revolt and Civil War in France and the Netherlands 1555-1585. Royal Netherlands Academy of Arts and Sciences.
- Michalewicz, Nathan (2020). Franco-Ottoman Diplomacy during the French Wars of Religion 1559-1610. George Mason University.
- Miquel, Pierre (1980). Les Guerres de Religion. Fayard.
- Nicoll, David (2020). Noble Identity during the French Wars of Religion: Antoine de Crussol, the duc d'Uzès. University of Warwick.
- Pernot, Michel (1987). Les Guerres de Religion en France 1559-1598. Sedes.
- Pernot, Michel (2013). Henri III: Le Roi Décrié. Éditions de Fallois.
- Roelker, Nancy Lyman (1968). Queen of Navarre: Jeanne d'Albret 1528-1572. Harvard University Press.
- Roelker, Nancy Lyman (1996). One King, One Faith: The Parlement of Paris and the Religious Reformation of the Sixteenth Century. University of California Press.
- Ribera, Jean-Michel (2018). Diplomatie et Espionnage: Les Ambassadeurs du Roi de France auprès de Philippe II - Du Traité du Cateau-Cambrésis (1559) à la mort de Henri III (1589). Classiques Garnier.
- Salmon, J.H.M. (1979). Society in Crisis: France in the Sixteenth Century. Metheun & Co.
- Shimizu, J. (1970). Conflict of Loyalties: Politics and Religion in the Career of Gaspard de Coligny, Admiral of France, 1519–1572. Geneva: Librairie Droz.
- Solnon, Jean-François (2001). Henri III: un désir de majesté. Librarie Académique Perrin.
- Sournia, Jean-Charles (1981). Blaise de Monluc: Soldat et Écrivain (1500-1577). Fayard.
- Sutherland, Nicola (1962). The French Secretaries of State in the Age of Catherine de Medici. The Athlone Press.
- Sutherland, Nicola (1973). The Massacre of St Bartholomew and the European Conflict 1559-1572. Macmillan.
- Thompson, James (1909). The Wars of Religion in France 1559-1576: The Huguenots, Catherine de Medici and Philip II. Chicago University Press.
- Vester, Matthew (2012). Renaissance Dynasticism and Apanage Politics: Jacques de Savoie-Nemours 1531-1585. Truman State University Press.
- Vray, Nicole (1997). La Guerre des Religions dans la France de l'Ouest: Poitou-Aunis-Saintonge 1534-1610. Geste Éditions.
- Wood, James (2002). The Kings Army: Warfare, Soldiers and Society during the Wars of Religion in France, 1562-1576. Cambridge University Press.
