= François Louis Michel Chemin Deforgues =

French politician and foreign minister

- Born: 29 September 1759; Vire
- Died: 10 September 1840 (aged 80); Maincy (Seine-et-Marne
- Education: College Louis-le-Grand
- Occupation(s): politician and lawyer
- Spouse: Jean Forgues Path & Anne-Bertrand Thomas de la Marche

François Louis Michel Chemin des Forgues (born 29 September 1759, in Vire – 10 September 1840, in Maincy (Seine-et-Marne)) was a French politician, and Foreign Minister.

== Biography ==
Son of Jean Forgues Path and Anne-Bertrand Thomas de la Marche, he came to Paris, at twelve years old, studying at the College Louis-le-Grand and then to law school. According to Madame Roland, he was clerk to Danton, when he was attorney for the Parlement of Paris, He was also committed to the authority of the octroi of Paris.

Member of the Commune of Paris, created 10 August 1792 and protected by Danton, he was appointed bureau chief of illumination, on 24 August and was deputy, from 2 September, with Marat, of the Supervisory Committee the town. On 3 September, he co-signed a Committee circular to justify the September massacres and considered a call to imitate the example of the "common good of Paris." Later, he protested his innocence, saying that his name had replaced another. On 30 Thermidor Year III (17 August 1795), he published a pamphlet entitled: "Deforgues to citizens (to defend themselves for having participated in massacres of September)", in which he claimed to have been attached to the administration of police on 14 September. However, according to Maurice Barthelemy, it was reported that at the worst moment, he imprisoned in the Abbaye citizen Claude Sujet who perished on the spot.

He was the first Secretary General of the Committee of Public Safety of The Mountain, dominated by Danton and Barère then, at the request of Jean-Nicolas Pache, was appointed Deputy Minister of War Bouchotte, 5th Division, on 9 May 1793. Miot de Melito, who knew him, said he was "a firm and decided, with the spirit of the enlightenment. His aristocratic origin had approached Barère." "

After 2 June he was appointed by the Convention at the Ministry of Foreign Affairs in the Executive Council, replacing Lebrun-Tondu on 21 June 1793, on motion of Marie-Jean Hérault de Séchelles who introduced him as: "a true Republican, a well spoken sans-culotte", and explained: "Deforgues has a well-organized mind, he loves the book and has done a lot." In fact, he thought only a little about the conduct of diplomatic business. In fact Barère, who had the upper hand on the diplomacy of the Year II, tightly controlled the machinery. Thus, at the request of Barère, he recruited agents of British counter intelligence, such as Richard Ferris, with missions to England and Ireland. His name appears not only in the English ministerial papers - particularly those of Lord Grenville - but also in the letter from the Foreign Office to Perrégaux asking 'Chemin-Deforgues' - (spelling adopted during the Revolution) - to promote disorder and "push the Jacobins in paroxysms of fury". With the endorsement of Barère, he was paid by the British government, among others, to counter the business of United Irishmen and disrupted services by untimely hiring, as he employed Jean Baptiste Noël Bouchotte at the Department of War.

On 4 March 1794 Jacques Hébert denounced him to the Cordeliers as follows: "A Deforgues who takes the place of Foreign Minister and well known that I call the Minister for Foreign Affairs!". On 13 Germinal Year II (2 April 1794) he was deposed and replaced by Martial Joseph Armand Herman. Arrested, he was imprisoned in Luxembourg for four months. On 14 Germinal, the warrant for his arrest was signed by du Barran, Élie Lacoste, Vadier, Moyse Bayle, Robespierre, Prieur de la Côte-d'Or, Barère - (his friend) - Saint-Just, Amar, Carnot and Collot d'Herbois; he wrote to the "Incorruptible", attributing his imprisonment as a result of his intimacy with Danton. In this letter, he took advantage of the protection of Barère. He was released after the 9th Thermidor.

His detention attributed to "Robespierre" exempted him from accounting for his deplorable administration. He "matures" somehow, and having to be diplomatic for his own interests, he was appointed in October 1799, at the Anglo-Russian invasion, Minister Plenipotentiary to the Batavian Republic, where he attended and succeeded Florent Guiot. He was recalled after 18 Brumaire, and replaced by Semonville. He lived in retirement when, in 1804, after the Louisiana Purchase in the United States, he was sent to New Orleans as trade commissioner. He spent five years in the country, where he married. On his return journey he was captured at sea by the English, but almost immediately released. Exiled to twenty leagues from Paris by Napoleon, he retired in August 1815 to Maincy, where he died.

Political offices
Preceded by Pierre Henri Hélène Marie Lebrun-Tondu	Minister of Foreign Affairs; 21 June 1793 – 2 April 1794	Succeeded by Jean Marie Claude Alexandre Goujon
