= André François =

André François may refer to:

- André François (athlete) (born 1964), Vincentian sprinter
- André François (cartoonist) (1915–2005), Hungarian-born French cartoonist
- André François (footballer) (1886–1915), French international footballer
- André François Bron de Bailly (1757–1847), French military officer who served in the French Revolutionary Wars and the Peninsular War
- André François Miot de Mélito (1762–1841), French statesman and scholar

== See also ==
- André-François Bourbeau, Canadian survival expert and professor emeritus
- André-François Deslandes (1689–1757), French philosopher
- André François-Poncet (1887–1978), French politician and diplomat
