= Claude Pinart =

Claude Pinart, seigneur de Comblisy and Crambailles (died 15 September 1605 in the Château de Cremailles) was a Secretary of State under the French king Henry III, from 13 September 1570 until ordered to retire on 8 September 1588. He was also baron of Cremailles and Malines and the first baron of Valois.

== Biography ==
He was the son of François, seigneur de Molines. He married Marie de L'Aubespine (d. 5 June 1591), daughter of Gilles de l'Aubespine, and cousin of Claude II de l’Aubespine on 13 February 1583. They had a son Henri Claude Pinart, Marquis de Louvois, Vicomte de Comblizy, and a daughter Madeleine (d. 6 April 1654 in Paris), who married Charles de Prunelé, Baron d'Esneval in 1583.

He was close to Catherine de' Medici, and accompanied her in 1578 and 1579.

In 1575, he visited Sweden for the negotiations of a possible marriage between Henry III and Princess Elizabeth of Sweden. He visited England as part of an embassy to Elizabeth I in April 1581.

He was succeeded by Louis de Revol in 1588 and, after he became retired, he was installed as military governor along with a family from Château-Thierry.

Political offices
Preceded by Claude II de l’Aubespine	Secretary of State for Foreign Affairs; 1570–1588	Succeeded by Louis de Revol
