= Jacques Bourdin =

French politician

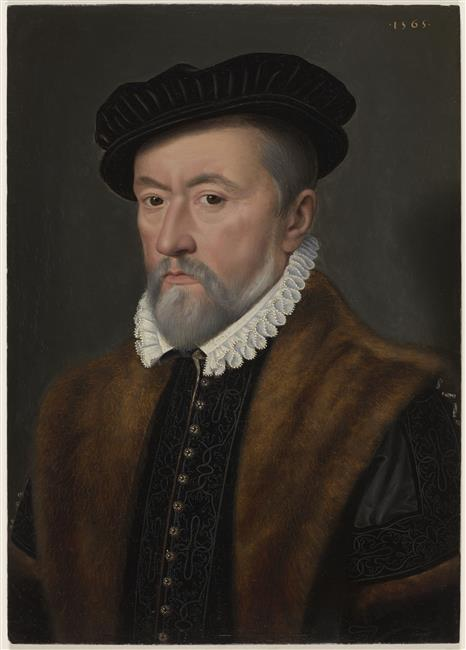
Jacques de Bourdin Portrait

Jacques Bourdin, seigneur de Villeines (died 6 July 1567) was a French Minister of Finances, 14 June 1549.

He was the son that was also Jacques Bourdin (d. 9 April 1534). His sister was Isabeau Boudin and Gilles Bourdin (1515 in Paris-23 January 1570) He married Catherine Brianson (d. 1579).

He became seigneur de Villaines in 1554 after the death of Jean Brinon.

Political offices
Preceded by Guillaume Bochetel	Secretary of State for Foreign Affairs; 1558–1567	Succeeded by Claude de L'Aubespine
Preceded by	Minister of the Navy and the Colonies; 1558–1567	Succeeded by Martin Ruzé de Beaulieu
