= Pierre Henri Hélène Marie Lebrun-Tondu =

French journalist and minister

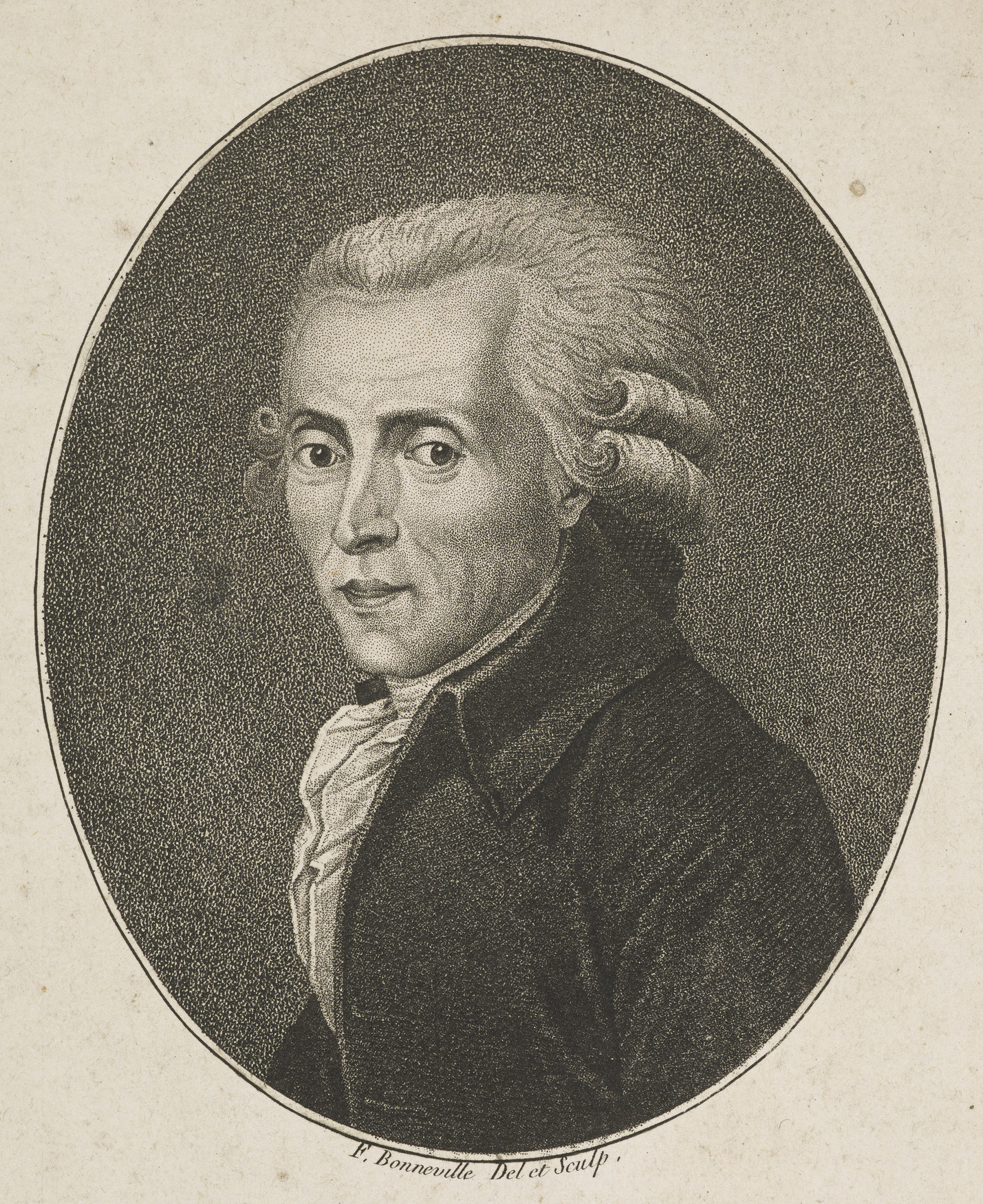
- Baptised: 28 August 1754; Noyon, France
- Died: 27 December 1793; Paris, France
- Cause of death: Execution by guillotine
- Occupations: Journalist; politician; revolutionary
- Title: Minister of Foreign Affairs
- Term: 10 August 1792—21 June 1793
- Predecessor: Claude Bigot de Sainte-Croix
- Successor: François Louis Michel Chemin Deforgues
- Spouse: Marie-Jeanne Adrienne Cheret
- Children: 7

Pierre-Henri-Hélène-Marie Lebrun-Tondu (né Tondu; French pronunciation: [pjɛʁ ɑ̃ʁi elɛn maʁi ləbʁœ̃ tɔ̃dy]; 28 August 1754 [baptismal date], Noyon – 27 December 1793, Paris) was a journalist and a French minister, during the French Revolution.

== Before the Revolution ==
The son of Christophe Pierre Tondu, a well-to-do merchant also churchwarden of his parish, and Elisabeth Rosalie Lebrun, he was sent as a youngster as a student at College Louis-le-Grand, Paris, under benefit of a scholarship grant from the Chapter of Canons of Noyon, a common situation in such schools run by priests. Louis-le-Grand was attended during those years by such famous-to-be people as La Fayette (a shade older than Tondu-Lebrun was), Maximilien Robespierre, Camille Desmoulins (both younger), and a bunch of others that played some role in the French Revolution as well (such as Feron, Noel...). However, his family ran into financial trouble (reasons are not known) and he had to become a teacher at Louis-le-Grand, the which position required at that time to become some level of tonsured cleric; thus he was known under the name "Abbot Tondu"; he moved to be employed at the Observatory of Paris about in 1777, where he devoted himself to mathematics and observations until early 1779. Then, for two years, he was a soldier, before obtaining his leave. Involved in some unclear contestation of French politics, he was banned by Minister Baron de Vergennes and had to move in the Prince-Bishopric of Liège in 1781 under the name "Pierre Lebrun", he became a foreman at the printing shop of Jean-Jacques Tutot, where he soon became editor.

=== Marriage and children ===
He married, in Liege on 28 July 1783, Marie-Jeanne Adrienne Cheret (as was written in French documents; some Belgian registers also write "Cherette"), who gave him seven children, out of which six grew to be adults:

- Jean-Pierre-Louis (born 21 July 1784),
- Josephine Barbe Marie (born 10 September 1786),
- Théodore Charles-Joseph Gilbert (born 16 February 1788),
- Marie-Francoise-Charlotte Henriette (born 11 August 1789),
- Isabelle Civilis Victoire Jemmapes Dumouriez, (born 11 November 1792),
- Sophie Minerve (born 13 February 1794) .

=== Career in printing ===
In June 1785, he left Tutot and, with Jacques-Joseph Smits, started the Journal général d'Europe, based in Liege, a periodical favorable to new ideas that met with great success. Increasingly critical of the Prince-Bishop, he, in July 1786, installed the presses in the Austrian Netherlands, in Herve (Limburg), near Liege. Having acquired Liege citizenship, he was closely involved in politics and participated in the Liège Revolution in 1789, also writing the Journal of Patriotic Liège from 18 March to 4 July 1790. During that period he turned to radical views such were later on embodied by Girondins and early days Montagnards in Paris, and was linked to the more radical Liege activists.

== During the Revolution ==
Forced into exile during the restoration of 1791, he moved to Lille in January, then to Paris, where he maintained some activity on account on the defunct Republic of Liège, such as develop with other exiles a draft constitution proclaiming the equality of all citizens, freedom of the press and the formation of an assembly where national bourgeois representation would count twice as large as those of the clergy and nobility, or on 18 December appearing before the Legislative Assembly at the head of a Liège delegation. However, he rapidly got engrossed in French Revolution politics through his newspaper he had revived starting March 1791. This got him in acquaintance with forefront players of those days, such as Jacques-Pierre Brissot, Etienne Claviere, Jean-Marie Roland and Charles François Dumouriez; Tondu-Lebrun's familiarity with politics and power play between Powers-that-be (England, German Empire, Prussia, France, Holland, Russia in Flanders and central Europe got him to be appointed as chief clerk of the 1st branch of the Ministry of Foreign Affairs of Dumouriez. After 10 August 1792 he became foreign minister in the Transitional Executive Council (11 August 1792) and submitted to the National Convention a political picture of Europe as of 25 September. An advocate of an immediate peace with Prussia after the battle of Valmy, he conducted secret negotiations, and after negotiations failed, he was a supporter of the war of conquest and defended the annexation of Belgium and the Netherlands. On 12 November he baptized his daughter, Civilis-Victoire-Jemmapes Dumouriez, and the God father was Dumouriez.

Temporarily in charge of the Ministry of War after the resignation of Servan in October, on 19 and 31 December he filed reports on projects of England against France in which he supported, however, for a peace policy, and showed the protests of Spain for Louis XVI. Chairman of the Executive Committee, after 20 January 1793, he signed the execution order of Louis XVI.

In the early months of 1793, he tried to reconnect with Lord Grenville, to avoid a rupture with Great Britain. On 7 March he reported to the Assembly of the rupture of diplomatic relations with Spain and its imminent entry into the war. On 2 February he summoned Semonville to justify himself in Paris and suspended his office, after suspicision of links with Louis XVI from the publication of a letter from Antoine Omer Talon, found in late November 1792.

=== Arrest and execution ===
Denounced by the end of 1792 by The Mountain for his close links with the Girondins, suspected of complicity with General Charles François Dumouriez, he was arrested on 2 June 1793 with 29 members and fellow Girondin, Étienne Clavière. First held temporarily in office, he was brought with Claviere before the Revolutionary Court on 5 September but managed to escape on the 9th and went into clandestinity while remaining in Paris, where he hid under a variety of names during several months; while under the name of Pierre Brasseur, citizen of Liege, he was arrested on 2 Nivose year II (22 December 1793), by Francois Heron, Agent of the Committee of General Security.

Brought before the revolutionary tribunal, he was sentenced to death on 7 Nivose (27 December) under a variety of contrived and undocumented treason against the unity of the Republic, conspiracy on account of foreign powers charges, the most obvious reason being of having been called to office by Roland, Brissot, Dumouriez, all guillotined or escaped from France. He was guillotined the following day. A barely sketched attempt at defense and justification, written by him (this document does not exceed mere introductory terms in the rather pompous style of those days), was published in the year IV under the title: Historical Memory and supporting my ministry.

== Note ==
LeBrun was not illegitimate, as Frederick Masson claims. According to the archives in Noyon, he was baptized on 28 August 1754, the "son of Mister Christophe-Pierre Tondu, churchwardern, and Elisabeth-Rosalie LeBrun." After becoming a Liégeois citizen, he changed his surname to Tondu-LeBrun and later dropped the Tondu.

Political offices
Preceded by Claude Bigot de Sainte-Croix	Minister of Foreign Affairs; 10 August 1792 – 21 June 1793	Succeeded by François Louis Michel Chemin Deforgues
Preceded by Joseph Marie Servan de Gerbey	Secretary of State for War; 3 October 1792 – 18 October 1792	Succeeded by Jean-Nicolas Pache
Preceded by Pierre Riel de Beurnonville	Secretary of State for War; 1 April 1793 – 4 April 1793	Succeeded by Jean Baptiste Noël Bouchotte
