= L'Aubespine =

French family descended from Claude de l'Aubespine

Coat of Arms of the L'Aubespine family

The L'Aubespine family was a French family descended from Claude de l'Aubespine, a lawyer of Orléans and bailiff of the abbey of Saint Euverte in the beginning of the 16th century. His progeny gained distinction in offices connected with the law. The family fell into poor circumstances and became extinct in the 19th century.

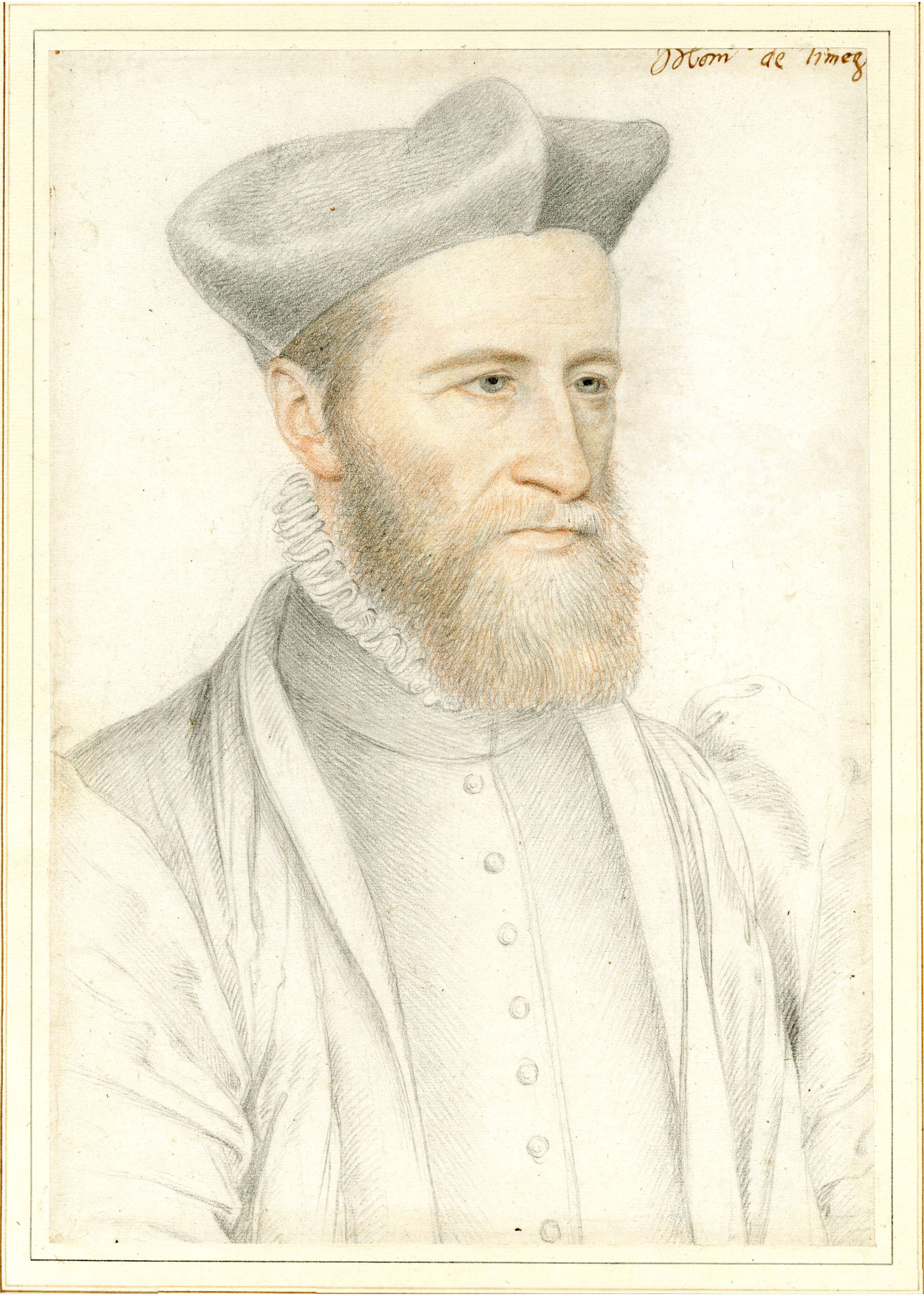
Sébastien de l'Aubespine.

== Notable members ==
- Sébastien de L'Aubespine (1518–1582) was abbot of Bassefontaine, and commendatory abbot of Mozac, bishop of Vannes and afterwards bishop of Limoges. He fulfilled important diplomatic missions in Germany, Hungary, England, the Low Countries, and Switzerland under King Francis I of France and his successors. He was plenipotentiary of France to the Treaty of Cateau-Cambrésis.
- Claude de L'Aubespine (1510–1567) was Sebastien's brother and baron of Chateauneuf-sur-Cher. He was a secretary of finance and he was in charge of negotiations with England in 1555 and 1559. He was commissioned several times to deal with the Huguenots in the king's name.
- Guillaume de l'Aubespine de Châteauneuf (1547-1625) was Claude's son, a councillor of state and ambassador to England.
- Madeleine de l’Aubespine (1546–1596) was a French poet, who corresponded with Ronsard. She married Nicolas de Neufville, seigneur de Villeroy.
- Charles de l'Aubespine (1580–1653) was ambassador to Germany, the Low Countries, Venice and England. He was Keeper of the Seals, from 1630 to 1633, and 1650 to 1651.
- François de L'Aubespine, marquis de Hauterive (c. 1584-1670) was a French general. Born into an old family of counselors and secretaries of state, he was the son of Guillame de L'Aubespine, Baron of Chateauneuf, and his brother Charles L'Aubespine, marquis de Châteauneuf. He fought in the Eighty Years' War beginning in the early seventeenth century, serving the states of Holland against Spain. At the siege of Jülich in 1610, his name appears among the officers of the regiment of Bethune. In 1644 he was colonel of a French regiment. The Marquis de Hauterive was general of the French infantry in Holland and governor of Breda. He later became lieutenant-general of the armies of the king. He won the confidence of Prince Frederick Henry, Prince of Orange, because of his opposition to Cardinal Richelieu. He married Eleanor of Volvire, Marchioness of Ruffec; they had a daughter, Charlotte, mother of the Duc de Saint-Simon, famous diarist.
