= Louis de Guiringaud =

French politician

Minister of Foreign Affairs
- In office 27 August 1976 – 29 November 1978
- President: Valéry Giscard d'Estaing
- Prime Minister: Raymond Barre
- Preceded by: Jean Sauvagnargues
- Succeeded by: Jean François-Poncet

Personal details
- Born: 12 October 1911 Limoges, France
- Died: 15 April 1982 (aged 70) Paris, France
- Education: Lycée Saint-Louis-de-Gonzague

Louis de Guiringaud (French pronunciation: [lwi də ɡiʁɛ̃ɡo]; 12 October 1911 – 15 April 1982) was a French politician who served as Minister of Foreign Affairs under Raymond Barre between 1976 and 1978. Previous to his appointment as a French Minister, Guiringuaud served as France's permanent representative to the UN from 1972 to 1976, also presiding as a member of the United Nations Security Council.

Guiringaud shot himself on 15 April 1982.

Political offices
Preceded by Jean Sauvagnargues	Minister of Foreign Affairs; 1976–1978	Succeeded by Jean François-Poncet
