= Profiles of Nature =

Canadian television series

Profiles of Nature is a long-running Canadian nature documentary television show. It is produced by Ellis Entertainment (also called Ellis Vision, and formerly the K.E.G. Productions Limited) of Ontario, Canada. This show has won multiple awards and has been broadcast in over 100 countries, including being shown on the Discovery Channel and Animal Planet cable television channels. According to Ellis Entertainment, this television series is the longest running primetime program on the Discovery Channel in the United States.

== Episodes ==
Profiles of Nature consists of 104 half-hour and 84 one-hour episodes, and has been in production since 1986.

Individual episodes have profiled various wildlife, including the gorilla, red-tailed hawk, the great gray owl (including footage by wildlife cinematographer Dalton Muir and noted Canadian wildlife photographer Robert R. Taylor, and many other species. Series 11 (produced in 2003) profiled tarantulas, the grizzly bear, the American black bear, the bobcat, and other species.

Some episodes in this series focus upon nature survival, including one episode entitled "Man of the Wilderness", which portrayed the survival skills of Canadian survival expert and professor emeritus at the Universite du Quebec a Chicoutimi, Andre-Francois Bourbeau. Bourbeau holds the Guinness World Record for longest voluntary wilderness survival of 31 days, a record he has held for nearly 30 years since 1986. This episode won a bronze medal at the Houston International Film Festival.

== Cast and production ==
Episodes of this television program are narrated by Ontario-based stage and film actor Neil Dainard.
