= Madeleine de L'Aubépine =

French aristocrat (1546–1596)

- Dame de Villeroy
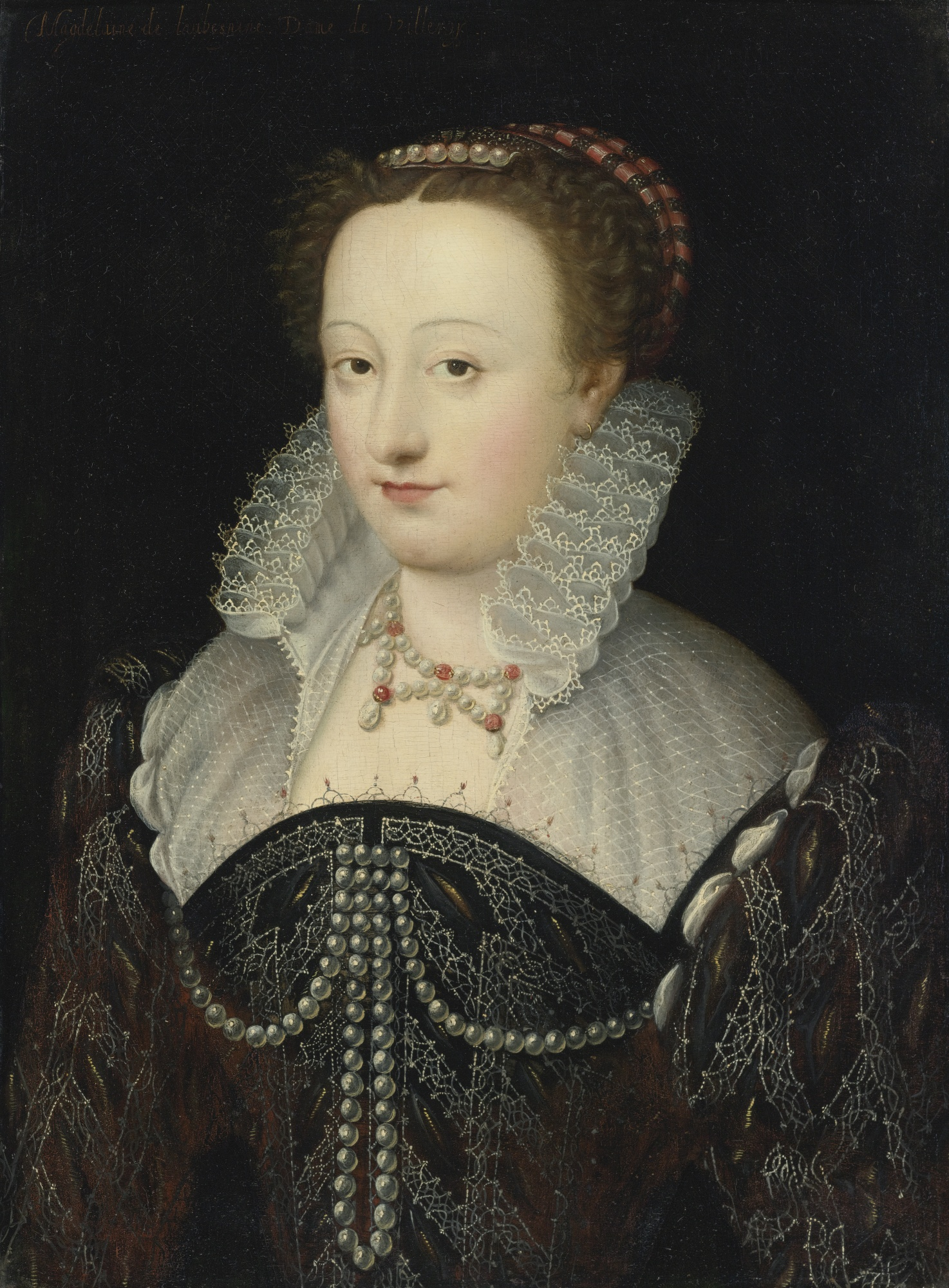
- Portrait of a woman, said to be Madeleine de L'Aubespine, Dame de Villeroy
- Born: 1546; Villeroy, Burgundy
- Died: 1596 (aged 49–50)
- Noble family: L'Aubespine
- Spouse: Nicolas de Neufville, seigneur de Villeroy
- Issue: Charles
- Father: Claude de l'Aubespine, baron de Châteauneuf
- Mother: Jeanne Bochetel

Madeleine de l'Aubespine, dame de Villeroy (1546–1596) was a French aristocrat, lady in waiting to Catherine de Medicis, poet, and literary patron. She was one of the only female poets praised by "the prince of poets," Pierre de Ronsard and she was one of the earliest female erotic poets.

== Family ==
Madeleine de L'Aubespine was born in Villeroy, Burgundy, the daughter of Claude de l'Aubespine, baron de Châteauneuf and Jeanne Bochetel. The high-ranking l'Aubespine family had served in ministerial duties for the French court for two centuries until the onset of the French Revolution. At the age of 16, l'Aubespine married Nicolas de Neufville, seigneur de Villeroy an already well-established, well-traveled minister of the king who would, over the course of his life, serve as secretary of state under four French kings from both the House of Valois and the House of Bourbon. L'Aubespine and Villeroy were survived by a single son, Charles, who would become the governor of Lyon and in 1619, made a marquis by Louis XIII.

== Literary Influence ==
L'Aubespine's literary influence was three-fold: she was a patron of the elite literary circles of 16th century France, a translator of works into the French vernacular, and a well-known poet whose work is still being discovered today.

=== Patronage ===
Despite the political and religious turmoil created by the Protestant Reformation, l'Aubespine and her husband enjoyed immense wealth and took part in the French initiative to create new national literature in the vernacular. Both she and her husband wrote their own poetry and took part in the patronage of some of the greatest Renaissance French writers including Pierre de Ronsard, Philippe Desportes, Agrippa d'Aubigné, and other lesser known writers. Philippe Desportes was even reported to have been one of l'Aubespine's lovers.

Not including her own salon, L'Aubespine is reported to have been active in three elite literary circles: in the court of Marguerite de Valois, Claude Catherine de Clermont's salon vert, and Henry III's Académie du Palais. Through her work within the elite literary salon and the influence afforded her as patron, l'Aubespine was able to guide French literary culture. Poems were composed both for l'Aubespine as the patron, and to praise her talents. In a dialogue held in sonnets, Ronsard praises l'Aubespine and predicts that she will surpass the most learned French men.

In addition to her work as a patron of artists, l'Aubespine also bought a vast amount of books; at the time of her death, l'Aubespine's library was inventoried, and found to contain over three thousand volumes many of which were richly illustrated and personalized. Susan Groag Bell, a women's history scholar, suggests that early women book owners were significant contributors to their community's culture, because these women's books would often be circulated internationally depending on dowries and trade. Additionally, many elite women's personalized editions of books influenced Christian and social iconography.

=== Translation ===
Among l'Aubespine's many literary contributions, she also translated famous works into the vernacular. It has only been through recent research that her translations –praised by many of her contemporaries—have been attributed to her. She translated the first two cantos of Ludovico Ariosto's Orlando furioso and four epistles from Ovid's Heroides from Italian and Latin respectively to French.

=== Poetry ===
Scholar, Ann Rosalind Jones writes that the women poets of the renaissance "wrote within but against the traditions that surrounded them." L'Aubespine is an exemplar of this tension of being both within and outside of the genre.

In correspondence with Ronsard, l'Aubespine calls herself the Phaeton to his French Apollo—an audacious son to a noble father—and he replies back in continuation of the mythic metaphor with:

If, flying, you fall, too willing to believe me,
At least you will have earned this glory for your tomb

That a woman surpassed the most learned French men.

This piece is exceptional, as there is little documentation of Ronsard praising women for their writing, however in this exchange through the Phaeton and Apollo metaphor, he refers to L'Aubespine as his successor. Because of her high position and her husband's income, there was not a pressing need for L'Aubespine to publish, and thus most of her work remained and circulated in manuscript form. According to scholar, Anna Kłosowska, there are only two major sources for l'Aubespine's lyric poems: a florilegium from 1718 and a posthumous volume of l'Aubespines complete works, which was lost in 1904 in a fire, though a detailed description of the volume survived. Robert Sorg first published a portion of L'Aubespine's work in 1926.

L'Aubespine is not just uncommon in the support she receives from her literary counterparts, but her poetic work as a woman is also exceptional. Anna Kłosowska, writes that, "While many of l'Aubespine's Petrarchist and pious sonnets are typical for her time, in some love poems she goes blatantly against the stereotype of female modesty."Veronica Franco, a famous Italian courtesan and fellow woman poet of the Renaissance, also demonstrated this disregard for strict adhesion to normative gender roles of the period through her love poetry. Like both l'Aubespine and Franco, many 16th century women poets wrote Petrarchan sonnets, but a particular problem that these women faced was in defining an object of desire that was necessary for the traditional form and themes, because in Petrarchan sonnets, the theme demonstrates a longing for a distant lover. For male poets, the lover would be female, and the poetry would be a courtly display of longing; however, women poets were put into a bind as they adapted their gender to the male-centered form. One of l'Aubespine's most well-circulated erotic poems, "Riddle," is exemplary of one of these atypical sonnets. In it, the lyric subject euphemistically describes playing a lute:

As the sweetest diversion that I could ever choose,
Frequently, after dinner, for fear of getting bored,
I take his neck in hand, I touch him, and I stroke,
Till he's in such a state as to give me delight.

I fall upon my bed and, without letting go,
I grasp him in my arms, I press him to my breast,
And moving hard and fast, all ravished with pleasure,
Amidst a thousand delights I fulfill my desire.

If he sometimes unfortunately happens to slacken,
I erect him with my hand, and right away I strive
To enjoy the delight of such a tender stroking.

Thus my beloved, so long as I pull on his sinew,
Contents and pleases me. Then away from me, softly,

Tired and not sated, I finally withdraw him.

As Kłosowska describes, this sonnet participates in the tradition of courtly erotic joke making in which erotic meaning lies under the thin pretense of non-erotic solution; however, l'Aubespine's appropriation of the genre complicates the traditional gender standards of the time, because her sonnet is woman-centered and outlines mutual sexual gratification. In this way, l'Aubespine adapts the traditional form to her needs, and influences the French literary world. Through several analyses of this piece, Kłosowska has deemed this poem the "most openly lesbian love poem written by a woman in sixteenth-century France." Further, Kłosowska explains how l'Aubespine's woman-centered, mutual satisfaction focused piece is a challenge to the erotic form of the 16th century. At the time l'Aubespine was reciting this work in salons and having it published in manuscripts, women's virtuosity and chastity were defining factors in their social standing, so the poet's focus on women's pleasure and sexual agency is rare for the period. The discovery and subsequent analysis of l'Aubespine's literary work has opened new avenues for the discussion of early modern gender and sexual roles and renaissance women's poetry.

== Notes ==
=== References ===
- Bell, Susan Groag (1989). "Medieval women book owners". In Judith Bennett; Elizabeth Clark; Jean O'Barr; B. Anne Vilen; Sarah Westphal-Wihl (eds.). Sisters and Workers in the Middle Ages. Chicago, IL: University of Chicago Press. ISBN 9780226042473.
- Benkov, Edith J. (1991). "Madeleine de l'Aubespine". In Katharina M. Wilson (ed.). Encyclopedia of Continental Women Writers. Vol. 1. London: Routledge. p. 705. ISBN 9780824085476.
- DeVos, Jessica (2012). Autobiography, Authorship, and Artifice: Reconsidering Renaissance Women Poets (Ph.D. thesis). Yale University.
- Jones, Ann Rosalind (1981). "Assimilation with a difference: Renaissance women poets and literary influence". Yale French Studies (62): 135–153. doi:10.2307/2929897. JSTOR 2929897.
- Kłosowska, Anna, ed. (2007a). "Introduction". Madeleine de l'Aubespine: Selected Poems and Translations, a Bilingual Edition. Chicago, IL: University of Chicago Press. pp. 1–33.
- Kłosowska, Anna (2007b). "Madeleine de l'Aubespine: life, works, and auto-mythography: an exchange with Ronsard, ca. 1570–80". French Forum. 32 (1/2): 19–38. doi:10.1353/frf.2008.0004. S2CID 191625187.
- Kłosowska, Anna (2008). "Erotica and Women in Early Modern France: Madeleine de l'Aubespine's Queer Poems". Journal of the History of Sexuality. 17 (2): 190–215. doi:10.1353/sex.0.0011. JSTOR 30114217. PMID 19260163. S2CID 30663066.
- Kłosowska, Anna (2010). "The post-human condition: subject modes in the poetry of Madeleine de l'Aubespine (1546–1596)". Postmedieval: A Journal of Medieval Cultural Studies. 1 (1/2): 88–98. doi:10.1057/pmed.2010.27. S2CID 10375509.
- Smarr, Janet Levarie (2001). "Substituting for Laura: objects of desire for Renaissance women poets". Comparative Literature Studies. 38 (1): 1–30. doi:10.1353/cls.2001.0008. JSTOR 40247277. S2CID 161642944.
