= André François-Poncet =

French politician and diplomat

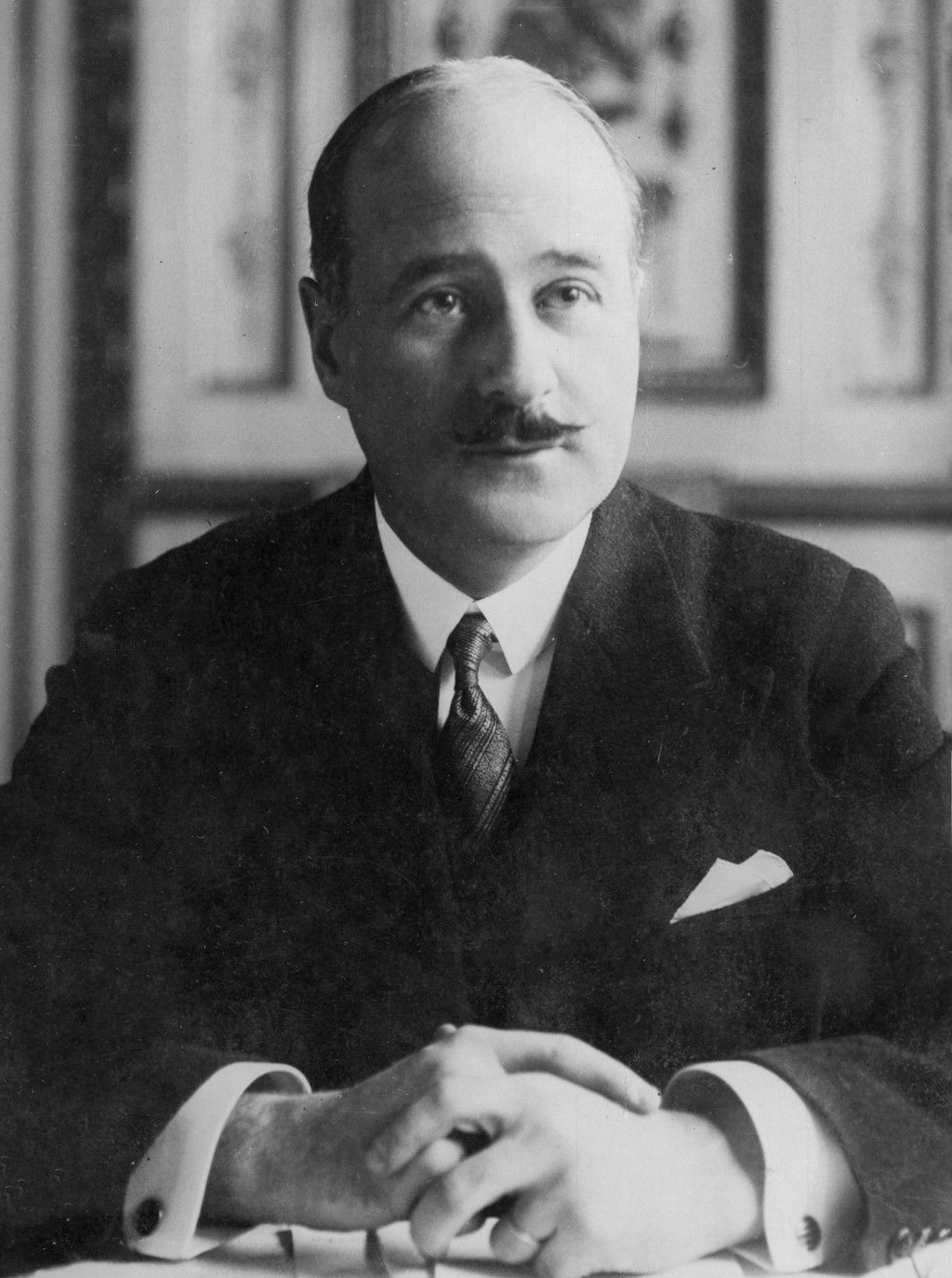
- François-Poncet in 1931

French High Commissioner to West Germany
- In office 21 September 1949 – 5 May 1955; Ambassador from 1 August 1955
- Preceded by: Vacant; Robert Coulondre (1938)
- Succeeded by: Louis Joxe

French Ambassador to Germany
- In office August 1931 – 18 October 1938
- Preceded by: Pierre de Margerie
- Succeeded by: Robert Coulondre

Personal details
- Born: 13 June 1887 Provins, Seine-et-Marne, France
- Died: 8 January 1978 (aged 90)
- Children: At least 1, including Jean François-Poncet.
- Education: Sciences Po

André François-Poncet (French pronunciation: [ɑ̃dʁe fʁɑ̃swa pɔ̃sɛ]; 13 June 1887 – 8 January 1978) was a French politician and diplomat whose post as ambassador to Germany allowed him to witness first-hand the rise to power of Adolf Hitler and the Nazi Party, and the Nazi regime's preparations for World War II.

== Biography ==
François-Poncet was the son of a counselor of the Court of Appeals in Paris. A student of German studies at the Paris Institute of Political Studies, his first area of study was journalism. One of François-Poncet's early written works included observations made during several journeys to the German Empire in the years prior to World War I. During the war, he served as an infantry lieutenant.

Between 1917 and 1919, he was assigned to the press office of the French embassy in Bern, Switzerland and later served with the International Economic Mission in the United States and in other diplomatic roles under a series of French leaders.

François-Poncet became managing director of the Société d'études et d'informations économiques (Society for Economic Studies and Information). In 1924, he was replaced by Émile Mireaux.

He served as a delegate to the League of Nations, and in August 1931 was named undersecretary of state and ambassador to Weimar Germany. From his post in Berlin, François-Poncet witnessed the rise of Hitler and later observed signs of Germany's plans for World War II. The insightful François-Poncet was described by American journalist William Shirer in his The Rise and Fall of the Third Reich as "the best informed ambassador in Berlin", but the French government generally did not heed the ambassador's many warnings about Hitler's intentions. François-Poncet was inadvertently involved in the purge of the Night of the Long Knives when, in Hitler's justification for the killings, he referred to a dinner that François-Poncet had attended with Ernst Röhm and Kurt von Schleicher as evidence that the men had been conspiring with the French to overthrow the German government. As the evidence was manufactured, François-Poncet himself was never named or charged with anything. An arrest of such a high-ranking diplomat on trumped-up charges would also have caused a major international scandal.

Despite his personal aversion to Nazism, François-Poncet was viewed favorably by Hitler, who remarked that "Poncet is the most intelligent of the diplomats I've known—including the German ones, of course." Shortly after the Munich Agreement was signed in 1938, François-Poncet left his post as French ambassador to Germany after a farewell visit to Hitler at the Eagle's Nest on 18 October 1938. He was then reassigned to Rome as ambassador to Fascist Italy. François-Poncet was appointed ambassador to Italy largely because he shared the desire of the Foreign Minister, Georges Bonnet, for closer Franco-Italian ties. On 19 November 1938, François-Poncet arrived at the Quirinal Palace to present his letters of accreditation to King Victor Emmanuel III as the ambassador of the French republic to the Kingdom of Italy. Most notably, François-Poncet addressed King Victor Emmanuel III as both King of Italy and Emperor of Ethiopia, thereby recognising the Italian conquest of Ethiopia. He served in that position until 1940 when Italy declared war on France.

On 23 January 1941, François-Poncet was made a member of the National Council of Vichy France. Arrested by the Gestapo during the wartime German occupation of France, François-Poncet was imprisoned for three years, held as an Sonderhaftling ("special prisoner") in Ifen Hotel in Kleinwalsertal, Austria.

In 1949, he was named French high commissioner to West Germany, a position which was later elevated to ambassador. François-Poncet served in this capacity until 1955. He was later vice president and president of the French Red Cross. In 1952, he was elected to the Académie française, taking the seat previously occupied by Marshal Philippe Pétain.

Occasionally contributing to the French newspaper Le Figaro, François-Poncet wrote numerous books, several based on his experience as French ambassador to Germany in the 1930s and reflecting his lifelong interest in Germany. At least one of his works, Souvenirs d'une ambassade à Berlin, published in France in 1946, was translated to English as The Fateful Years: Memoirs of a French Ambassador in Berlin, 1931–1938 in 1949.

André François-Poncet was the father of Jean François-Poncet, also a French politician and diplomat who served as Minister of Foreign Affairs under French President Valéry Giscard d'Estaing.

== Books and articles ==
- Salerno, Reynolds M. (February 1997). "The French Navy and the Appeasement of Italy, 1937-9". English Historical Review. 112 (445): 66–104. doi:10.1093/ehr/CXII.445.66.
