= Nicolas de Neufville, seigneur de Villeroy =

French secretary of state (1543–1617)

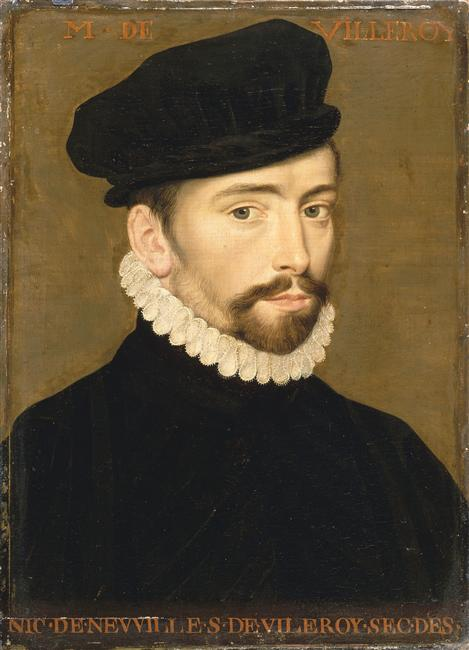
Nicolas de Neufville, seigneur de Villeroy

Nicolas IV de Neufville, seigneur de Villeroy (1543 – 12 November 1617) was a secretary of state under four kings of France: Charles IX, Henry III, Henry IV, and Louis XIII. The most distinguished of all sixteenth-century French secretaries, Villeroy rose to prominence during the French Wars of Religion, a period of almost insoluble difficulties for the French monarchy and government. Despite faithfully serving Henry III, Villeroy found himself sacked by him without explanation in 1588, along with all the king's ministers. He was reinstated by Henry IV in 1594 and became more important than ever before. He remained in office until his death in 1617 during the reign of Louis XIII.

Villeroy grew up at court and entered government service at a young age, following in the footsteps of his father Nicolas III de Neufville, and both grandfathers. In 1559, at the age of sixteen, he became a financial secretary and was soon employed by Catherine de' Medici, the widow of Henry II and the mother of the next three kings. Because those kings were either too young, too ill, or, in Henry III's case, too irresponsible to attend to the details of administration, Catherine took control of the government. In order to manage, she formed around her a core of trusted ministers, including Villeroy.

In 1567, at the age of twenty-four, Villeroy became a secretary of state in succession to his father-in-law, Claude II de l'Aubespine. His wife, Madeleine de l'Aubespine, (1546–96) whom he probably married in 1561, was not only beautiful but learned enough to translate the epistles of Ovid.

Villeroy himself had attended the Collège de Navarre, but did not remain in education for long enough to achieve high literary style — Cardinal Richelieu was to say of Villeroy that he possessed excellent judgement without advanced education (non aidé d'aucunes lettres)—though he occasionally wrote poetry himself and knew the poet Ronsard. Villeroy and Madelaine had two sons and a daughter, but only one son, named Charles after the king, survived. Villeroy remarried after his wife's death in 1596 and had another son, Nicolas, who entered religion, becoming the abbot of La Chaise-Dieu. He was also commendatory abbot of Mozac, from 1571 - 1610.

Villeroy soon became a favourite with the young Charles IX. He was also loved by Catherine de' Medici, and by Henry III until that king became detached and distant towards the end of his reign. Villeroy often found himself responsible for the negotiation of peace treaties. Perhaps his greatest achievement in that field was the Treaty of Fleix of 26 November 1580, which he concluded in one month, bringing to an end a short but dangerous war involving Henry of Navarre (the future Henry IV) in the south west of the country.

Villeroy formed a strong relationship with Catherine de' Medici. Their letters to each other show mutual trust and respect. "You are so wise," Catherine wrote to him concerning the difficulties posed by the behaviour of her son François, Duke of Anjou, "that you do not need any further advice about that or any other matter".

From 1582, Villeroy found himself tested by the increasingly eccentric behaviour of Henry III, who responded to the mounting disorder in France and to financial pressures by withdrawing to religious retreats and refusing to attend to business in person. For example, he wrote to Villeroy, "While I am with the Capuchins if there are any urgent and important things...you should, all of you, show them to the queen without sending them to me". Villeroy on one occasion dared to rebuke the king for his interest in a religious foundation ahead of state affairs:

You were King of France before you became the leader of this company and your conscience requires that you render to royalty that which you owe it, before rendering to the congregation that which you have promised. You can excuse yourself from one but not from the other. Sackcloth you wear only when you choose, but the crown is always upon your head; and it is not less heavy in this solitude than it is in the midst of your affairs.

Henry also began to shower offices and privileges on his favourites, particularly Jean Louis de Nogaret de La Valette, first duke of Épernon. In September 1587, in front of the king, Épernon savagely accused Villeroy of misdirecting funds and acting on his own authority, and he added that if the king were not present, he would have attacked Villeroy physically. The incident shook Villeroy so badly that he remained in his room for two days, too distressed and afraid to return to his work. Villeroy then asked the king if he could leave the court, but the king refused his request. Above all, Villeroy was concerned about his spotless reputation; but he was reassured by the support of the majority at court who hated Épernon. Catherine de' Medici was shocked at the secretary's treatment and supported Villeroy vigorously, saying she had not been so upset about any matter for a long time.

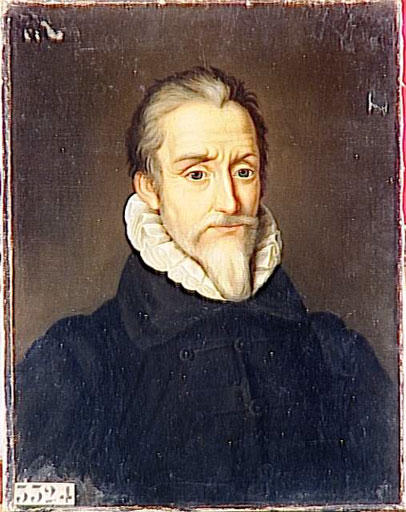
Nicolas de Neufville, seigneur de Villeroy

In the summer of 1588, the king's position became perilous when Henry I, Duke of Guise, and his followers in the Catholic League took control of Paris, co-ordinating their move with the Spanish Armada that Philip II of Spain had sent against Protestant England. Henry III managed to evade capture; but later that year faced a meeting of the Estates of Blois, packed with his enemies. On 8 September, at Blois, Villeroy received a note from the king dismissing him from his job. Henry dismissed the rest of his chief ministers at the same time. His letter to Villeroy began:

Villeroy, I remain very well contented with your service; do not fail however to go away to your house where you will stay until I send for you; do not seek the reason for this my letter, but obey me.

Henry offered Villeroy and his colleagues neither explanation nor compensation.

No definitive motive for the king's decision has been established by historians. It may merely have been the impulsive act of a man losing touch with reality. Contemporaries of the period suggest it was a purposeful distancing from the policies and influence of his mother, Catherine de Medici. Mendoza elucidated that the King justified his ministers' dismissal by describing Villeroy as "vain and wanting to monopolise royal favour", discrediting other secretaries such as Brûlart and Pinart as "nonentities" or "rascals".

On 28 December that year, the king ordered the murder of Henry, Duke of Guise, who was stabbed by the royal bodyguard and died at the foot of the king's bed. Eight months later, Henry III was assassinated himself, by a friar called Jacques Clément.

After the assassination of Henry III in 1589 and the succession of Henry IV, Villeroy at first worked for the Catholic League. Villeroy came back to power in 1594 once Henry IV recanted his Protestant faith and returned to the Catholic fold. An expert on foreign affairs, under Henry IV he was the second minister under Sully. He aided in Sully's downfall in 1611, becoming principal minister. His own ministerial preeminence was challenged by Sillery from 1614 onwards.

Villeroy died in 1617 and was buried in the church of Magny-en-Vexin. An effigy of Villeroy in middle age may be seen in the church today, along with those of his father and Magdalene.

Villeroy lived near the Louvre in a house that has been in the possession of his family since 1370, the Hôtel de Villeroy located at the corner of rue des Bourdonnais, rue de la Limace (today absorbed by rue des Halles) and rue des Déchargeurs. The building was rebuilt in 1640 by his grandson Nicolas V de Villeroy and still exists today. The historic courtyard can be seen from 9 rue des Déchargeurs through the windows of the exposition center Cremerie de Paris. The Hotel de Villeroy became a historic Monument in 1984 thus being protected from real estate promotion.

== Notes ==
Political offices
Preceded by Claude de l'Aubespine	Minister of Foreign Affairs; 28 October 1567 – 1588	Succeeded by Louis de Revol
Preceded by Louis de Revol	Minister of Foreign Affairs; 30 December 1594 – 9 August 1616	Succeeded by Cardinal Richelieu
