= Jacques Bochetel de la Forest =

French politician

Jacques Bochetel de la Forest or de La Forêt (died 1595) was a French politician, treasurer of the household to Francis II of France, and ambassador at the court of Elizabeth I.

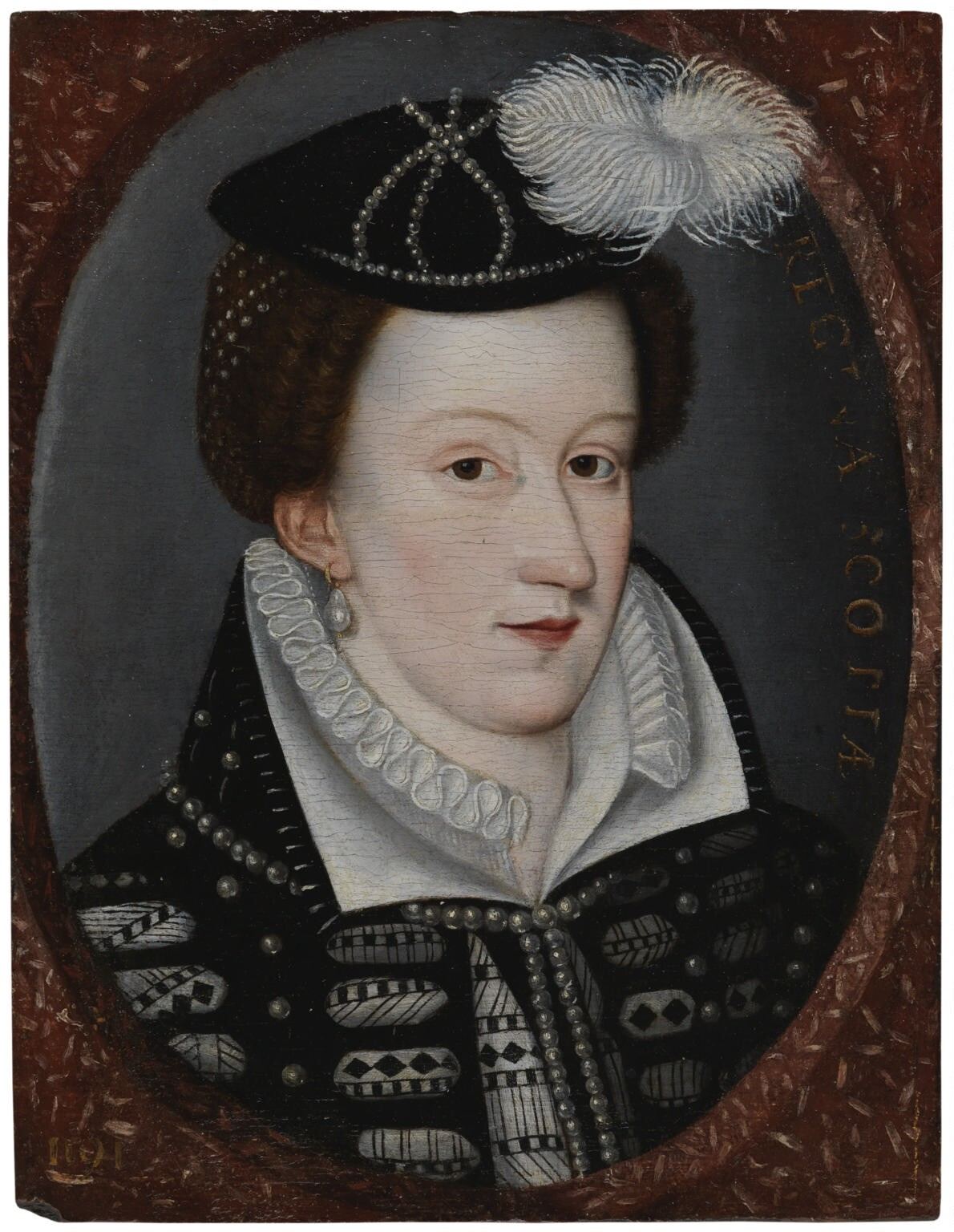
Jacques Bochetel sent news regarding Mary, Queen of Scots to the French court

== Family ==
He was a son of Guillaume Bochetel (died 1558) and Marie de Morvilliers de la Sourdière. Guillaume Bochetel was an administrator of royal finance and ambassador to England in 1535, attending a meeting at Calais to discuss a marriage between the infant Princess Elizabeth and Charles de Valois.

Jacques Bochetel and his brothers and sisters were thought to be Protestants or Protestant sympathisers. His sister Catherine married Antoine Vulcob, sieur de Coudron. Her son, his nephew, Jacob or Jean de Vulcob, sieur de Sassy (died 1607), was identified as a Huguenot sympathiser who joined him in London in 1566, and remained in diplomatic contact with the English court. In August 1566, Jean de Vulcob was at Greyfriars, Stamford, during the royal progress, and discussed the possibility of Elizabeth I marrying the Earl of Leicester, and, with Elizabeth's physician, the idea of her marrying Charles IX of France.

The family home was the Château de Breulhamenon or Brouillamnon at Plou, Cher, later renamed Château de Castelnau. The Renaissance château was demolished, but a 3D paper model made in the 18th-century survives in the Cher archives.

== Mary, Queen of Scots, and her pearls ==
In May 1568, an envoy from Regent Moray in Scotland, Nicolas Elphinstone, brought jewels and pearls belonging to the deposed Mary, Queen of Scots for sale in London. Elizabeth bought the pearls. Bochetel wrote that Elphinstone showed them to Elizabeth and the Earl of Pembroke on 1 May, who "found them to be of incomparable beauty".

Bochetel described Mary's pearls in detail in letters to Catherine de' Medici and Charles IX of France, although he does not seem to have seen the items in person. There were six cordons or sashes strung like paternosters, each with twenty five pearls, many large and beautiful, the most part as big as muscady nuts, nutmegs. They were valued by several merchants for Elizabeth. English merchants suggested 10,000 crowns, Italians 12,000, a merchant from Geneva suggested 16,000. Elizabeth, it was thought, paid 12,000. There were no black pearls. Bochetel's French words for nutmeg "noix muscades" seem to be the origin of an idea that Mary's pearls were black, by confusion with the word "noir". The influential 19th-century biographer Agnes Strickland wrote of pearls resembling "black muscades" and purple Muscatel grapes.

Catherine de' Medici wanted him to buy the pearls for her. Bochetel described the pearls in London, the valuation, and their purchase by Elizabeth on 8 May 1568:

"I know that the large pearls, of which you have written to me, are here, and, as described to me, there are six cordons, which are strung or threaded like paternosters (rosary beads), and, moreover, with about 25 pearls to part and separate one from another (set as entredeux dividing decades), more beautiful and much larger than the threaded pearls, for the most part as big as nutmegs. Over the last three day they have been appraised by various merchants, this Queen [Elizabeth I] wishes to buy them at the set price ... They were first shown to three or four London goldsmiths and lapidaries who estimated them at £3000 or 10,000 Écu, and Elizabeth was offered credit for this sum. Some Italian merchants, who saw them afterwards, valued them at almost 12,000 Écu, around the price, as I have heard, that Elizabeth paid for them ... The rest of the jewels did not approach the pearls in value, and were nondescript, except a piece of unicorn's horn which is nicely mounted in goldsmith's work and highly decorated".

At this time, Mary, Queen of Scots, escaped from Lochleven Castle and made her way to England. Bochetel forwarded a description of her defeat at the Battle of Langside. He wrote to Catherine de' Medici that Elizabeth's offers of assistance for the Scottish queen were only, "subterfuges et délayemens".

== Mary and Bochetel ==
Mary wrote to Bochetel from Carlisle asking for help for her agent George Douglas on 26 June 1568. She wrote to him from Bolton Castle in October 1568, hoping that he would support and liaise the Bishop of Ross, John Lesley, and the Abbott of Kilburne, at the York Conference.

In November 1568, Bochetel was replaced as ambassador in London by Bertrand de Salignac de la Mothe-Fénelon.

== Marriage and children ==
Jacques Bochetel married Marie de Morogues, a daughter of Jean de Morogues, seigneur de Lande et du Sauvage and Marguerite Perreau. She was also involved in Anglo-French diplomacy, in 1566 forming a friendship in Paris with Elizabeth Hoby, wife of the English ambassador Thomas Hoby.

Their son, also Jacques Bochetel, served the Duke of Anjou. He was killed in 1577 fighting at Issoire in the Auvergne, a town held by Huguenots.

Their daughter, Marie Bochetel, a lady in waiting, married Michel de Castelnau, seigneur de Mauvissière, in 1575. He was also French ambassador to London. Her portrait was engraved by Jean Rabel and Thomas de Leu in the 1580s.

His sister, Jeanne Bochetel, had married a lawyer Claude de l'Aubespine, baron de Châteauneuf. Their son Guillaume de l'Aubespine de Châteauneuf became ambassador in London in 1585.
