= Claude Bigot de Sainte-Croix =

French politician (1744–1803)

Claude Bigot de Sainte-Croix (French: [klod biɡo də sɛ̃t kʁwa]; 3 May 1744 in Paris – 25 August 1803 in London) was the Minister for Foreign Affairs from 1 August 1792 to 10 August 1792.

On 1 August 1792, he was appointed Foreign Minister, and he fulfilled his duties for ten days, during which he barely had time to show his courage and loyalty to the king, especially the day of 10 August 1792. He fled to London, and died in exile.

Political offices
Preceded by François Joseph de Gratet, vicomte Dubouchage	Minister of Foreign Affairs; 1 August 1792 – 10 August 1792	Succeeded by Pierre Henri Hélène Marie Lebrun-Tondu
