= Ministry for Europe and Foreign Affairs (France) =

Foreign affairs government office of France

- Ministère de l'Europe et des Affaires étrangères (French); MEAE

Agency overview
- Formed: 1547; 479 years ago
- Type: Ministry; Ministry of Foreign Affairs; Ministries of France
- Headquarters: Hôtel du ministre des Affaires étrangères, 37 Quai d'Orsay, Paris 7^{e}
- Agency executive: Jean-Noël Barrot, Minister for Europe and Foreign Affairs
- Website: diplomatie.gouv.fr

The Ministry for Europe and Foreign Affairs (French: Ministère de l'Europe et des Affaires étrangères [ministɛʁ də løʁɔp e dez‿afɛʁ(z‿)etʁɑ̃ʒɛʁ], MEAE) is the ministry of the Government of France that handles France's foreign relations. Since 1855, its headquarters have been located at 37 Quai d'Orsay, close to the National Assembly. The term Quai d'Orsay is often used as a metonym for the ministry. Its cabinet minister, the minister for Europe and foreign affairs (French: Ministre de l'Europe et des Affaires étrangères) is responsible for the foreign relations of France. The current officeholder, Jean-Noël Barrot, was appointed in September 2024. For a brief period from 1984 to 1986, the office was titled minister for external relations.

In 1547, royal secretaries became specialised, writing correspondence to foreign governments and negotiating peace treaties. The four French secretaries of state where foreign relations were divided by region, in 1589, became centralised with one becoming first secretary responsible for international relations. The Ancien Régime position of Secretary of State for Foreign Affairs became Foreign Minister around 1723; it was renamed Minister of Foreign Affairs in 1791 in the aftermath of early stages of the French Revolution. All ministerial positions were abolished in 1794 by the National Convention and reestablished with the Directory.

== Central administration ==
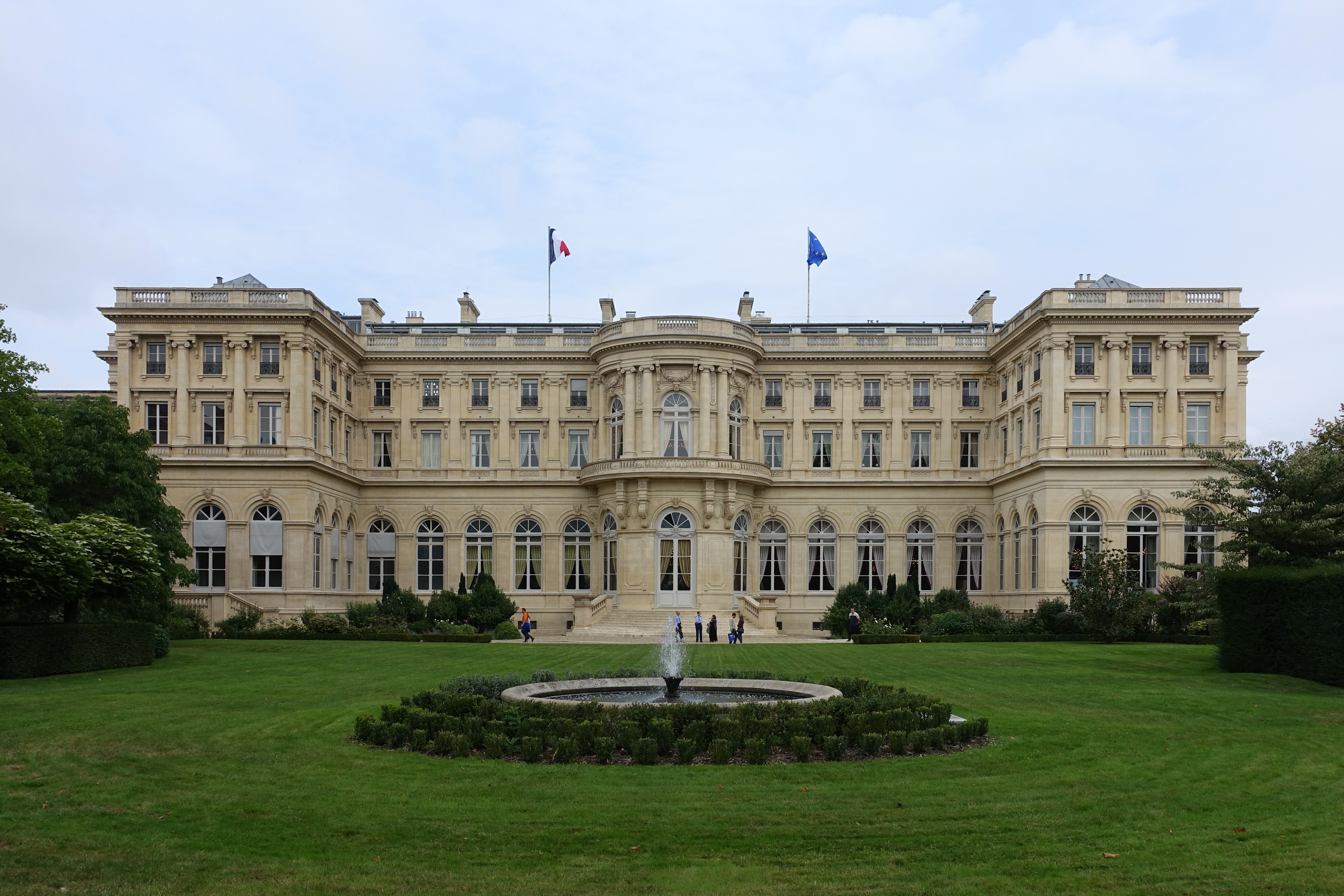
Foreign Affairs Ministry building on the Quai d'Orsay

There are multiple services under its authority, along with that of some other ministers. Under the authority of the Minister of Foreign Affairs and International Development, that of Cooperation and European Affairs, and that of Foreign and European Affairs, there are numerous services directly related to the ministers. Here is a list of those services.

- The ministers' cabinet
- The office of cabinets, which gathers a personnel in charge of the administrative and logistics aspects of the three ministers' cabinets
- The budget control service (CBCM)
- General inspection of foreign affairs (IGAE)
- The prospective office (DP)
- The Protocole, upon which the President's protocol cell relies
- The Crisis management Department (CDC)

== Secretaries of State (1547–1723) ==
Name	from	to
Guillaume Bochetel, seigneur de Sussy	1547	1558
Côme Clausse, seigneur de Marchaumont	1547	1559
Claude de l’Aubespine	1 April 1547	1567
Jean du Thiers, seigneur de Beauregard	1547	1559
Jacques Bourdin, seigneur de Villeines	1558	1567
Florimond II Robertet, seigneur de Fresnes	1558	1567
Florimond III Robertet d'Alluye	1559	1569
Simon Fizes, baron de Sauves	22 October 1567	27 November 1579
Nicolas de Neufville, seigneur de Villeroy	28 October 1567	1588
Pierre Brûlart, seigneur de Genlis	8 June 1569	1588
Claude Pinart, seigneur de Comblisy and Crambailles	1570	1588
Louis de Revol	1 January 1589	17 September 1594
Nicolas de Neufville, seigneur de Villeroy	30 December 1594	9 August 1616
Armand Jean du Plessis, duc de Richelieu, Bishop of Luçon	30 November 1616	24 April 1617
Pierre Brulart, vicomte de Puysieux	24 April 1617	11 March 1626
Raymond Phelypeaux, seigneur d'Herbault	11 March 1626	2 May 1629
Claude Bouthillier	2 May 1629	18 March 1632
Léon Bouthillier, comte de Chavigny	18 March 1632	23 June 1643
Henri-Auguste de Loménie, comte de Brienne	23 June 1643	3 April 1663
Hugues de Lionne	3 April 1663	1 September 1671
Simon Arnauld, marquis de Pomponne	1 September 1671	18 November 1679
Charles Colbert, marquis de Croissy	12 February 1680	28 July 1696
Jean-Baptiste Colbert, marquis de Torcy	28 July 1696	22 September 1715
Nicolas du Blé, marquis d'Huxelles	23 September 1715	1 September 1718

== Minister for Foreign Affairs (1718–1791) ==
Name	from	to
Guillaume Dubois	24 September 1718	10 August 1723
Charles Jean-Baptiste Fleuriau, comte de Morville	16 August 1723	19 August 1727
Germain Louis Chauvelin	23 August 1727	20 February 1737
Jean-Jacques Amelot de Chaillou	22 February 1737	26 April 1744
Adrien Maurice, duc de Noailles	26 April 1744	19 November 1744
René de Voyer de Paulmy, marquis d'Argenson	19 November 1744	10 January 1747
Louis Philogène Brûlart, vicomte de Puisieulx	27 January 1747	9 September 1751
François Dominique de Barberie de Saint-Contest	11 September 1751	24 July 1754
Antoine Louis Rouillé	24 July 1754	28 June 1757
François Joachim de Pierre de Bernis	28 June 1757	9 October 1758
Étienne François, duc de Choiseul	3 December 1758	13 October 1761
César Gabriel de Choiseul-Chevigny, duc de Praslin	13 October 1761	10 April 1766
Étienne François, duc de Choiseul	10 April 1766	24 December 1770
Louis Phélypeaux, duc de La Vrillère	24 December 1770	6 June 1771
Emmanuel Armand de Vignerot du Plessis de Richelieu, duc d'Aiguillon	6 June 1771	2 June 1774
Henri Léonard Jean Baptiste Bertin	2 June 1774	21 July 1774
Charles Gravier, comte de Vergennes	21 July 1774	13 February 1787
Armand Marc, comte de Montmorin Saint-Hérem	14 February 1787	13 July 1789
Paul François de Quelen, duc de la Vauguyon	13 July 1789	16 July 1789
Armand Marc, comte de Montmorin Saint-Hérem	16 July 1789	29 November 1791

== Ministers of Foreign Affairs (1791–2007) ==
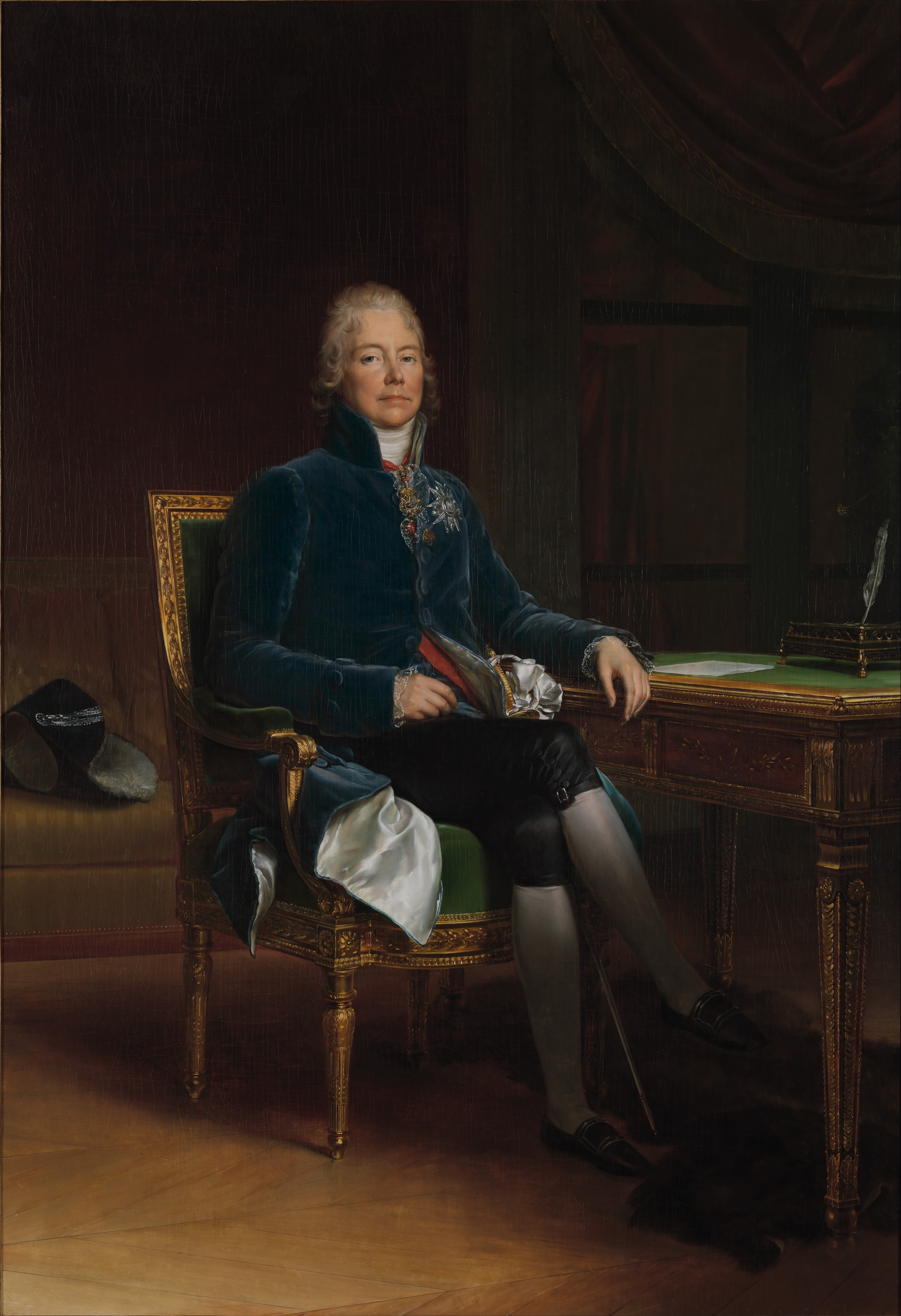
Portrait of Talleyrand by François Gérard, 1808

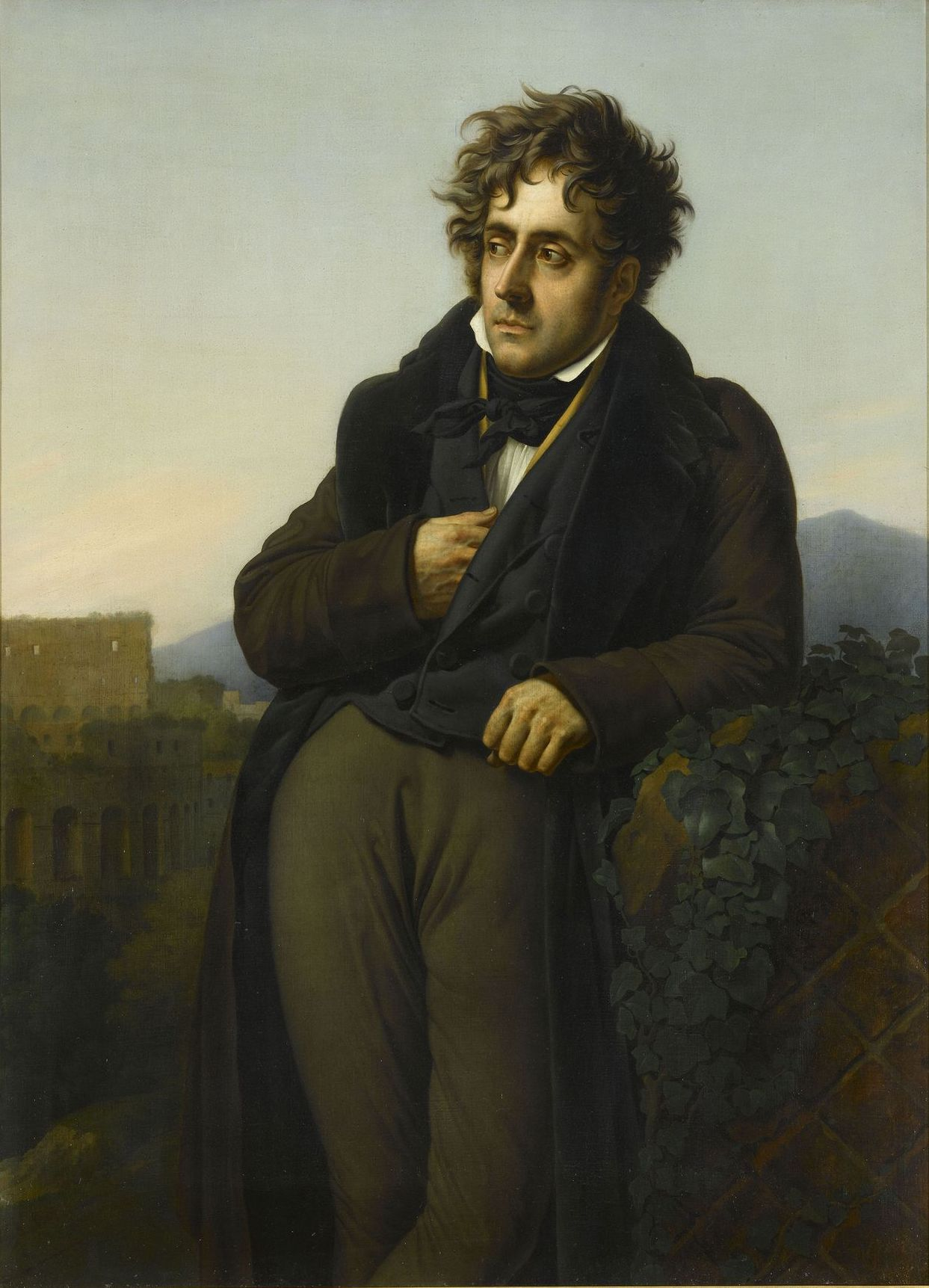
Portrait of Chateaubriand by Anne-Louis Girodet de Roussy-Trioson, 1809

Name	from	to
Claude Antoine Valdec de Lessart	29 November 1791	15 March 1792
Charles Dumouriez	15 March 1792	13 June 1792
Pierre Paul de Méredieu, baron de Naillac	13 June 1792	18 June 1792
Scipion Victor, marquis de Chambonas	18 June 1792	23 July 1792
François Joseph de Gratet, vicomte Dubouchage	23 July 1792	1 August 1792
Claude Bigot de Sainte-Croix	1 August 1792	10 August 1792
Pierre Henri Hélène Marie Lebrun-Tondu	10 August 1792	21 June 1793
François Louis Michel Chemin Deforgues	21 June 1793	2 April 1794
Jean Marie Claude Alexandre Goujon	5 April 1794	8 April 1794
Martial Joseph Armand Herman	8 April 1794	20 April 1794
Philibert Buchot	20 April 1794	3 November 1795
Michel Ange Bernard Mangourit	3 November 1794	21 November 1794
André François Miot de Melito	21 November 1794	19 February 1795
Jean-Victor Colchen	19 February 1795	3 November 1795
Charles-François Delacroix	3 November 1795	15 July 1797
Charles Maurice de Talleyrand-Périgord	15 July 1797	20 July 1799
Charles-Frédéric Reinhard	20 July 1799	22 November 1799

=== Consulate and First Empire ===
Name	from	to
Charles Maurice de Talleyrand, prince de Bénévent	22 November 1799	9 August 1807
Jean-Baptiste Nompère de Champagny, duc de Cadore	9 August 1807	17 April 1811
Hugues Bernard Maret, duc de Bassano	17 April 1811	20 November 1813
Armand Augustin Louis Caulaincourt, duc de Vicence	20 November 1813	1 April 1814
Antoine René Charles Mathurin, comte de Laforest	3 April 1814	13 May 1814

=== First Restoration and the Hundred Days ===
Name	from	to
Charles Maurice de Talleyrand-Périgord, prince de Bénévent	13 May 1814	20 March 1815
Armand Augustin Louis Caulaincourt, duc de Vicence	20 March 1815	22 June 1815
Louis, baron Bignon	22 June 1815	7 July 1815

=== Second Restoration ===
Name	from	to
Charles Maurice de Talleyrand-Périgord, prince de Bénévent	9 July 1815	26 September 1815
Armand Emmanuel du Plessis, duc de Richelieu	26 September 1815	29 December 1818
Jean Joseph Paul Augustin, marquis Dessolles	29 December 1818	19 November 1819
Étienne Denis, baron Pasquier	19 November 1819	14 December 1821
Mathieu Jean Félicité, duc de Montmorency-Laval	14 December 1821	28 December 1822
François-René, vicomte de Chateaubriand	28 December 1822	4 August 1824
Ange Hyacinthe Maxence, baron de Damas	4 August 1824	4 January 1828
Auguste, comte de La Ferronays	4 January 1828	24 April 1829
Anne Pierre Adrien, duc de Montmorency-Laval	24 April 1829	14 May 1829
Joseph-Marie, comte Portalis	14 May 1829	8 August 1829
Jules Armand Auguste Marie, prince de Polignac	8 August 1829	29 July 1830
Victor Louis Victurnien, duc de Mortemart	29 July 1830	
Louis, baron Bignon	31 July 1830	1 August 1830

=== July Monarchy ===
Name	from	to
Jean-Baptiste, comte Jourdan	1 August 1830	11 August 1830
Louis, comte Molé	11 August 1830	2 November 1830
Nicolas Joseph, marquis Maison	2 November 1830	17 November 1830
Horace François Bastien, baron Sébastiani	17 November 1830	11 October 1832
Victor, duc de Broglie	11 October 1832	4 April 1834
Henri Gauthier, comte de Rigny	4 April 1834	10 November 1834
Charles Joseph, comte Bresson	10 November 1834	18 November 1834
Henri Gauthier, comte de Rigny	18 November 1834	12 March 1835
Victor, duc de Broglie	12 March 1835	22 February 1836
Adolphe Thiers	22 February 1836	6 September 1836
Louis, comte Molé	6 September 1836	31 March 1839
Louis Napoléon Lannes, duc de Montebello	31 March 1839	12 May 1839
Nicolas Jean de Dieu Soult, duc de Dalmatie	12 May 1839	1 March 1840
Adolphe Thiers	1 March 1840	29 October 1840
François Guizot	29 October 1840	23 February 1848

=== Second Republic ===
Name	from	to
Alphonse de Lamartine	24 February 1848	11 May 1848
Jules Bastide	11 May 1848	29 June 1848
Marie-Alphonse Bedeau	29 June 1848	17 July 1848
Jules Bastide	17 July 1848	20 December 1848
Édouard Drouyn de Lhuys	20 December 1848	2 June 1849
Alexis de Tocqueville	2 June 1849	31 October 1849
Alphonse de Rayneval	31 October 1849	17 November 1849
Jean-Ernest Ducos, vicomte de La Hitte	17 November 1849	9 January 1851
Édouard Drouyn de Lhuys	9 January 1851	24 January 1851
Anatole, baron Brénier de Renaudière	24 January 1851	10 April 1851
Jules Baroche	10 April 1851	26 October 1851
Louis Félix Étienne, marquis de Turgot	26 October 1851	28 July 1852

=== Second Empire ===
Name	from	to
Édouard Drouyn de Lhuys	28 July 1852	7 May 1855
Alexandre Colonna, comte Walewski	7 May 1855	4 January 1860
Jules Baroche	4 January 1860	24 January 1860
Édouard Thouvenel	24 January 1860	15 October 1862
Édouard Drouyn de Lhuys	15 October 1862	1 September 1866
Charles, marquis de La Valette	1 September 1866	2 October 1866
Lionel de Moustier	2 October 1866	17 December 1868
Charles, marquis de La Valette	17 December 1868	17 July 1869
Henri, prince de La Tour d'Auvergne	17 July 1869	2 January 1870
Napoléon, comte Daru	2 January 1870	14 April 1870
Émile Ollivier	14 April 1870	15 May 1870
Agenor, duc de Gramont	15 May 1870	10 August 1870
Henri, prince de La Tour d'Auvergne	10 August 1870	4 September 1870

=== Third Republic ===
Name	from	to
Jules Favre	4 September 1870	2 August 1871
Charles, comte de Rémusat	2 August 1871	25 May 1873
Albert, duc de Broglie	25 May 1873	26 November 1873
Louis Decazes, duc de Glucksberg	29 November 1873	23 November 1877
Gaston-Robert, marquis de Banneville	23 November 1877	13 December 1877
William Henry Waddington	13 December 1877	28 December 1879
Charles de Freycinet	28 December 1879	23 September 1880
Jules Barthélemy-Saint-Hilaire	23 September 1880	14 November 1881
Léon Gambetta	14 November 1881	30 January 1882
Charles de Freycinet	30 January 1882	7 August 1882
Charles Duclerc	7 August 1882	29 January 1883
Armand Fallières	29 January 1883	21 February 1883
Paul-Armand Challemel-Lacour	21 February 1883	20 November 1883
Jules Ferry	20 November 1883	6 April 1885
Charles de Freycinet	6 April 1885	11 December 1886
Émile Flourens	11 December 1886	3 April 1888
René Goblet	3 April 1888	22 February 1889
Eugène Spuller	22 February 1889	17 March 1890
Alexandre Ribot	17 March 1890	11 January 1893
Jules Develle	11 January 1893	3 December 1893
Jean Casimir-Perier	3 December 1893	30 May 1894
Gabriel Hanotaux	30 May 1894	1 November 1895
Marcellin Berthelot	1 November 1895	28 March 1896
Léon Bourgeois	28 March 1896	29 April 1896
Gabriel Hanotaux	29 April 1896	28 June 1898
Théophile Delcassé	28 June 1898	6 June 1905
Maurice Rouvier	6 June 1905	13 March 1906
Léon Bourgeois	14 March 1906	25 October 1906
Stéphen Pichon	25 October 1906	2 March 1911
Jean Cruppi	2 March 1911	27 June 1911
Justin de Selves	27 June 1911	9 January 1912
Raymond Poincaré	14 January 1912	22 January 1913
Charles Jonnart	22 January 1913	22 March 1913
Stéphen Pichon	22 March 1913	9 December 1913
Gaston Doumergue	9 December 1913	9 June 1914
Léon Bourgeois	9 June 1914	13 June 1914
René Viviani	13 June 1914	3 August 1914
Gaston Doumergue	3 August 1914	26 August 1914
Théophile Delcassé	26 August 1914	13 October 1915
René Viviani	13 October 1915	29 October 1915
Aristide Briand	29 October 1915	20 March 1917
Alexandre Ribot	20 March 1917	23 October 1917
Louis Barthou	23 October 1917	16 November 1917
Stéphen Pichon	16 November 1917	20 January 1920
Alexandre Millerand	20 January 1920	24 September 1920
Georges Leygues	24 September 1920	16 January 1921
Aristide Briand	16 January 1921	15 January 1922
Raymond Poincaré	15 January 1922	9 June 1924
Edmond Lefebvre du Prey	9 June 1924	14 June 1924
Édouard Herriot	14 June 1924	17 April 1925
Aristide Briand	17 April 1925	19 July 1926
Édouard Herriot	19 July 1926	23 July 1926
Aristide Briand	23 July 1926	14 January 1932
Pierre Laval	14 January 1932	20 February 1932
André Tardieu	20 February 1932	3 June 1932
Édouard Herriot	3 June 1932	18 December 1932
Joseph Paul-Boncour	18 December 1932	30 January 1934
Édouard Daladier	30 January 1934	9 February 1934
Louis Barthou	9 February 1934	9 October 1934
Pierre Laval	13 October 1934	24 January 1936
Pierre Étienne Flandin	24 January 1936	4 June 1936
Yvon Delbos	4 June 1936	13 March 1938
Joseph Paul-Boncour	13 March 1938	10 April 1938
Georges Bonnet	10 April 1938	13 September 1939
Édouard Daladier	13 September 1939	21 March 1940
Paul Reynaud	21 March 1940	18 May 1940
Édouard Daladier	18 May 1940	5 June 1940
Paul Reynaud	5 June 1940	16 June 1940

=== Vichy France ===
Name	from	to
Paul Baudoin	16 June 1940	28 October 1940
Pierre Laval	28 October 1940	13 December 1940
Pierre Étienne Flandin	13 December 1940	9 February 1941
François Darlan	10 February 1941	18 April 1942
Pierre Laval	18 April 1942	20 August 1944

=== Free France ===
Name	from	to
Maurice Dejean	24 September 1941	17 October 1942
René Pleven	17 October 1942	5 February 1943
René Massigli	5 February 1943	10 September 1944

=== Fourth Republic ===
Name	from	to
Georges Bidault	10 September 1944	16 December 1946
Léon Blum	16 December 1946	22 January 1947
Georges Bidault	22 January 1947	26 July 1948
Robert Schuman	26 July 1948	8 January 1953
Georges Bidault	8 January 1953	19 June 1954
Pierre Mendès-France	19 June 1954	20 January 1955
Edgar Faure	20 January 1955	23 February 1955
Antoine Pinay	23 February 1955	1 February 1956
Christian Pineau	1 February 1956	14 May 1958
René Pleven	14 May 1958	1 June 1958

=== Fifth Republic ===
Name	from	to
Maurice Couve de Murville	1 June 1958	30 May 1968
Michel Debré	30 May 1968	22 June 1969
Maurice Schumann	22 June 1969	15 March 1973
André Bettencourt	15 March 1973	4 April 1973
Michel Jobert	4 April 1973	28 May 1974
Jean Sauvagnargues	28 May 1974	27 August 1976
Louis de Guiringaud	27 August 1976	29 November 1978
Jean François-Poncet	29 November 1978	22 May 1981
Claude Cheysson	22 May 1981	7 December 1984
Roland Dumas	7 December 1984	20 March 1986
Jean-Bernard Raimond	20 March 1986	12 May 1988
Roland Dumas	12 May 1988	29 March 1993
Alain Juppé	29 March 1993	18 May 1995
Hervé de Charette	18 May 1995	4 June 1997
Hubert Védrine	4 June 1997	7 May 2002
Dominique de Villepin	7 May 2002	31 March 2004
Michel Barnier	31 March 2004	2 June 2005
Philippe Douste-Blazy	2 June 2005	15 May 2007

== Ministers of Foreign and European Affairs (2007–2012) ==
Name	from	to
Bernard Kouchner	16 May 2007	14 November 2010
Michèle Alliot-Marie	14 November 2010	27 February 2011
Alain Juppé	27 February 2011	15 May 2012

== Ministers of Foreign Affairs and International Development (2012–2017) ==
Name	from	to
Laurent Fabius	16 May 2012	11 February 2016
Jean-Marc Ayrault	11 February 2016	10 May 2017

== Ministers of Europe and Foreign Affairs (2017–present) ==
Name	from	to
Jean-Yves Le Drian	17 May 2017	20 May 2022
Catherine Colonna	20 May 2022	11 January 2024
Stéphane Séjourné	11 January 2024	21 September 2024
Jean-Noël Barrot	21 September 2024	Present

== See also ==
- History of French foreign relations to 1981
- Foreign relations of France
