= Guillaume Bochetel =

French statesman and diplomat

Guillaume Bochetel, seigneur de Sassy, Brouillamenon, Laforest-Thaumyer (died 1558) was a statesman and diplomat of the French Renaissance during the reigns of François I and Henry II of France.

== Biography ==
Bochetel descended from a family which had its origins in Reims, Champagne. The family had moved to Berry when his great grandfather had married Jean Bochetel, the sister of Jacques Cœur, then great financier of King Charles VII of France. His parents were Bernardin Bochetel and Catherine Babouin, his paternal grandparents Francis and Marie Bochetel Pellorde.

He married Mary Morvilliers, Lady of the Sourdiere, and their children included:

- Bernardin who became bishop of Rennes in 1558 and abbot of St. Lawrence Auxerrois
- Jacques Bochetel de la Forest, his heir, who became an outstanding diplomat
- Marie, who married in 1542 Claude de l'Aubespine, Lord of Hauterives, Baron of Chateauneuf-sur-Cher and Secretary of State. [5]
- Jean
- Jeanne, who married Jacques Bourdin Secretary of State

His children had the same tutors as the royal children including Jacques Amyot and Jacques Lefevre d'Etaples.

In 1540 he bought from Jean Courtois Breuilhamenon the lordship of the lands in Berry. Guillaume died in 1558.

== Career ==
He began his career with the office of clerk of aid and gabelles in Berry. On 27 July 1518, King Francis I of France appointed him of notary clerk of the king's chamber, where he distinguished himself by writing in February 1522 an ordinance dealing with the dispersal of territorial soldiers. In December 1529, the king asked him to accompany the Vicomte de Turenne in Spain to negotiate his third marriage to Eleanor of Austria, Charles V's sister, a widow of King Manuel I of Portugal

On 22 August 1530, the king appointed him secretary, of royal finances and entrusted the office of Secretary of royal finances and acts Royal two years later. In May 1535, he left with the Royal Admiral Philippe Chabot to Calais to negotiate with England. In 1537, he was sent by the king in Leucate to negotiate peace with the Emperor Charles V and accompanied the king during his trip to Piedmont in 1538.

On 29 September 1542, he was made Clerk of the Order of Saint Michael. In 1546, he negotiated, concluded and signed the Treaty of Ardres with Henry VIII of England, signed on 7 June.

== Works ==
- Le sacre & coronement de la Royne imprime par commandemet du Roy nostre Sire, Éditeur Geoffroy Tory. Paris 1530. Bibliothèque de l’institut National d’Histoire de l’art. Collection Doucet. Cote inventaire NUM 8 Res 599.
- L’Entree de la Royne en sa ville & cité de Paris imprimee par le commadement du Roy nostre Sire, Éditeur Geoffroy Tory. Paris 1531. Bibliothèque de l’Institut National d’Histoire de l’art. Collection Doucet. Coté inventaire NUM 8 Res 600.

Political offices
Preceded by unknown	Minister of Foreign Affairs; 1547–1558	Succeeded by Jacques Bourdin
