= Jean François-Poncet =

French politician and diplomat

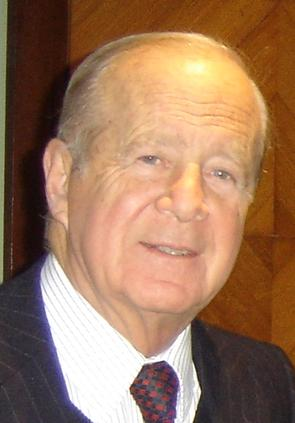

Minister of Foreign Affairs
- In office 29 November 1978 – 13 May 1981
- President: Valéry Giscard d'Estaing
- Preceded by: Louis de Guiringaud
- Succeeded by: Claude Cheysson

Senator for Lot-et-Garonne
- In office 25 September 1983 – 30 September 2011

Personal details
- Born: 8 December 1928 Paris, France
- Died: 18 July 2012 (aged 83) Paris, France
- Party: Union for French Democracy, Union for a Popular Movement
- Parent: André François-Poncet (father)
- Education: Wesleyan University (BA); Paris Law School (JD); École nationale d'administration

Jean François-Poncet (French pronunciation: [ʒɑ̃ fʁɑ̃swa pɔ̃sɛ]; 8 December 1928 – 18 July 2012) was a French politician and diplomat who served as Minister of Foreign Affairs under President Valéry Giscard d'Estaing from 1978 to 1981. From 1983 until 2011, he was a member of the Senate for Lot-et-Garonne.

François-Poncet had served as a diplomat in the government in the 1950s and 1960s. "Entering politics in 1967, he was elected in Lot-et-Garonne, as [a] member of the general council". François-Poncet was CEO of Carnaud SA, a packaging business, from 1971 to 1974. He returned to government service in 1974 when President Valéry Giscard d'Estaing appointed François-Poncet secretary of state at the Ministry of Foreign Affairs. In 1976 President Giscard d'Estaing appointed François-Poncet Secretary General in the Office of the President, "a key post in French politics". In 1978 d'Estaing appointed François-Poncet Minister of Foreign Affairs. He held the latter position until 1981.

In the 1980s he participated in three conferences of the Bilderberg group (in 1982, 1985 and 1988).

In 1983, he was elected senator from the Department of Lot-et-Garonne. François-Poncet served in the Senate until 2010, where he chaired the Economic Affairs Committee until 2001 and was Vice President of the Foreign Relations and Defense Committee as well as Vice President of the Senatorial European Affairs Committee. "He led Senate delegations in Eastern Europe, South-East Asia, China, Central Asia, Afghanistan, and most Middle Eastern countries."

He received his B.A. from Wesleyan University in 1947, his M.A. from the Fletcher School of Law and Diplomacy at Tufts University in 1948, and his PhD in economics from the Paris Law School. François-Poncet was also a graduate of the École nationale d'administration.

He died, aged 83, in Paris, France.

He was the son of André François-Poncet, also a French politician and diplomat, whose diplomatic post as French Ambassador to Germany allowed him to witness the rise to power of Adolf Hitler and the Nazi Party, as well as the Third Reich's preparations for war.

Political offices
Preceded by Louis de Guiringaud	Minister of Foreign Affairs; 1978–1981	Succeeded by Claude Cheysson
