= Jean Sauvagnargues =

French politician

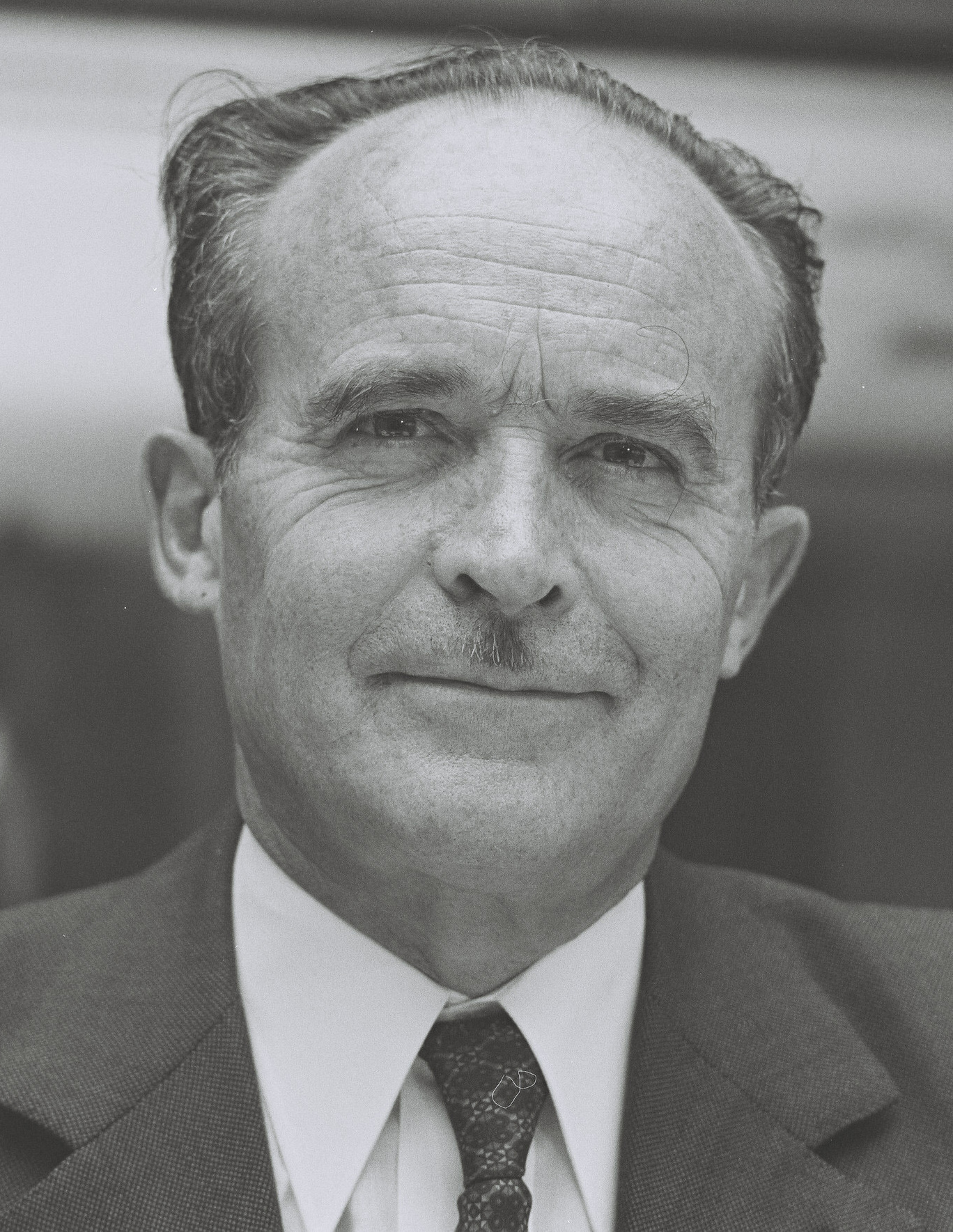
- Jean Sauvagnargues (1974)

French Minister of Foreign Affairs
- In office 28 May 1974 – 27 August 1976
- President: Valéry Giscard d'Estaing
- Preceded by: Michel Jobert
- Succeeded by: Louis de Guiringaud

Personal details
- Born: 2 April 1915 Paris, France
- Died: 6 August 2002 (aged 87) Lausanne, Switzerland
- Education: École Normale Supérieure

Jean Sauvagnargues (French pronunciation: [ʒɑ̃ sovaɲaʁɡ]; 2 April 1915 – 6 August 2002) was a French politician who served as Minister of Foreign Affairs under Valéry Giscard d'Estaing from 1974 to 1976 and was Ambassador to Ethiopia, Tunisia, West Germany, and the United Kingdom. Sauvagnargues died on 6 August 2002 in Lausanne, aged 87.

== Honours ==
- Commandeur de la Légion d’Honneur,
- Commandeur de l’ordre national du Mérite,
- Croix de guerre.

== See also ==
- List of Ambassadors of France to the United Kingdom

Political offices
Preceded by Michel Jobert	Minister of Foreign Affairs; 1974–1976	Succeeded by Louis de Guiringaud
