= Michel Jobert =

French politician (1921–2002)

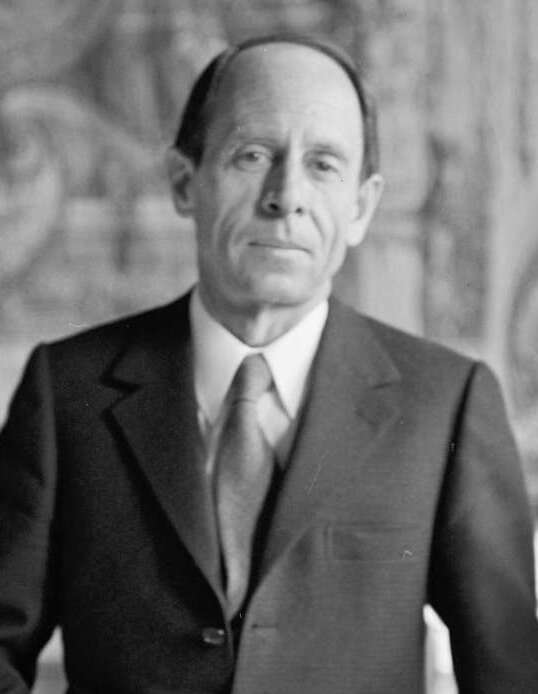

French Minister of Foreign Affairs
- In office 4 April 1973 – 28 May 1974
- President: Georges Pompidou
- Prime Minister: Pierre Messmer
- Preceded by: André Bettencourt
- Succeeded by: Jean Sauvagnargues

Chief of Staff of President of France
- In office 1969–1973
- President: Georges Pompidou
- Preceded by: Bernard Beck
- Succeeded by: Édouard Balladur

Personal details
- Born: 11 September 1921 Meknes, French Morocco
- Died: 25 May 2002 (aged 80) Paris, France
- Education: Sciences Po, ÉNA

Michel Jobert (French: [miʃɛl ʒɔbɛʁ]; 11 September 1921 – 25 May 2002) was a French politician of the left-wing Gaullist orientation. He served as Minister of Foreign Affairs under Georges Pompidou, and as Minister of External Commerce under François Mitterrand.

His tenure was marked, in part, by tense relations with the United States as he pursued French independence in the sphere of foreign relations. This policy at one point led a frustrated Henry Kissinger to call him "an idiot" and a "bad" foreign minister. Jobert died on 25 May 2002 in Paris, aged 80.

Political offices
Preceded by André Bettencourt	Minister of Foreign Affairs; 1973–1974	Succeeded by Jean Sauvagnargues
Preceded by Michel Cointat	Minister of External Commerce; 1981–1983	Succeeded by Édith Cresson
