= Bertrand de Salignac de la Mothe-Fénelon =

French diplomat

Bertrand de Salignac de la Mothe-Fénelon (1523–1589) was a French diplomat who served as ambassador to Elizabeth I in England and to James VI in Scotland.

== Ambassador in London ==
Mothe-Fénelon was secretary to the French ambassador Gilles de Noailles during the crisis of the Scottish Reformation in 1560.

After serving in the French army he was sent ambassador to England in November 1568, as a replacement for Jacques Bochetel de la Forest. At the request of Charles IX of France he endeavoured to excuse to Elizabeth the St. Bartholomew's Day massacre as a necessity caused by a plot which had been laid against the life of the king. After the death of Charles IX, Fénelon continued as ambassador in London. Mothe-Fénelon was involved the exchanges of gifts and portraits between the English and French court, including the work of the François Clouet and possibly Nicholas Hilliard.

He was recalled in 1575 when Catherine de' Medici wished to bring about a marriage between Elizabeth and the duke of Alençon, and thought that another ambassador, Michel de Castelnau, would have a better chance of success in the negotiation.

=== Mothe-Fénelon and Mary, Queen of Scots ===
While in England, Mothe-Fénelon corresponded with Mary, Queen of Scots on political matters. He also bought textiles and sewing materials for her, and advised on potential gifts for Elizabeth. In 1574 Mary, Queen of Scots embroidered an incarnate satin skirt with silver thread using materials bought in London by Mothe-Fénelon. She soon wrote for more incarnate silk thread, better quality thinner silver thread, and incarnate taffeta for the lining. Mothe-Fénélon presented the finished item to Elizabeth on 22 May, with a declaration of friendship, and reported to Charles IX that the gift was a success. Presumably hopeful of an audience at the English court, Mary asked the Archbishop of Glasgow, her contact in Paris, to send coifs embroidered with gold and silver and the latest fashion in Italian ribbons and veils for her hair.

Mary planned making more gifts for Elizabeth and wrote to Mothe Fénélon for advice on what she would like best. She asked him to send lengths of gold passementerie and braids called "bisette". Mothe Fénélon mentions gifts such as "three small night caps of her own handiwork", troys petites coyfures de nuict, ouvrées de sa main. Elizabeth remained cautious of Mary's gifts, and was reluctant to try some sweets which Mothe Fénélon offered her as a gift from the brother of the chancellor of Mary's dowry, for fear of poison.

In October 1574, Fénélon heard that Margaret Douglas, Countess of Lennox, had left the court in England and was travelling to her house in the north of England. From there she intended to visit her grandson James VI at Stirling Castle. The visit to Scotland did not happen, but she organised the wedding of her son Charles Stuart to Elizabeth Cavendish, which greatly displeased Queen Elizabeth. In September 1575, Fénélon received a letter from the former Regent Arran, now known as the Duke of Châtellerault, and a small portrait or miniature of James VI of Scotland, probably derived from a work of Arnold Bronckorst or an artist recorded as the "French painter". The portrait and the letter were intended to be forwarded to Mary, Queen of Scots.

=== England and Scotland in 1583 ===
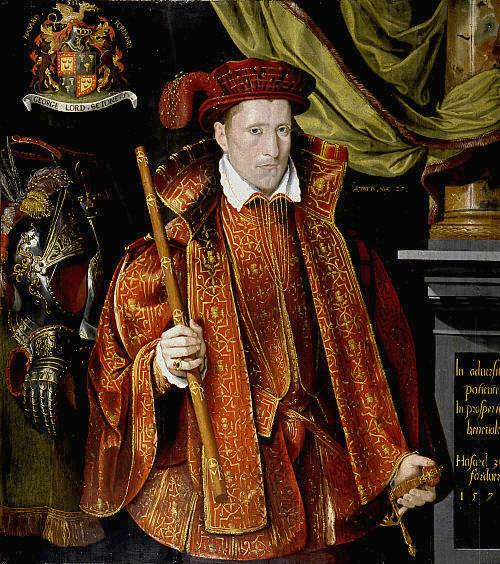
George Seton, 7th Lord Seton, was the French ambassador's ally in Edinburgh

In August 1582, the government of Scotland passed into the hands of the Ruthven Raiders, a rule known as the Gowrie Regime. Mothe-Fénelon and another French diplomat, François de Rocherolles, Sieur de Mainville, were instructed to ensure that James VI was at liberty, continue discussions about the return of Mary to Scotland to rule in "association" with James VI, and the rehabilitation of Esmé Stewart, 1st Duke of Lennox, who had been exiled by the Raiders.

They were sent as ambassadors to Scotland in December 1582. Mary, Queen of Scots, sent him a cipher key and her instructions. Elizabeth I gave him a passport to travel to Berwick-upon-Tweed and he was accompanied by her diplomat William Davison.

James VI wished to avoid him meeting Esmé Stewart, 1st Duke of Lennox in his journey. While travelling to Berwick in December 1582, by chance near Northallerton the ambassador encountered the Duke of Lennox, who was travelling south. Mothe-Fénelon corresponded with George Seton, 7th Lord Seton, who offered him the use of his lodging in Edinburgh. In January 1583, he stayed in Robert Gourlay's house on the Lawnmarket, at the top of the Royal Mile. Mainville arrived by ship at Burntisland on 19 January and came to Leith by the ferry boat.

Diplomatic discussions involved the topic of a marriage for James. The ambassador advocated the Auld Alliance, and reminded James that his grandfather James V of Scotland had married Madeleine of Valois and Mary of Guise. The English diplomat, Robert Bowes and William Davison, reported that Mothe-Fénelon and Maineville were trying to build a French faction in Scotland, help by the financial insecurity of the Ruthven Regime. After a banquet given by the Provost of Edinburgh, Alexander Clark, and the burgh council, Mothe-Fénelon went to Seton Palace and returned to Berwick.

== Return to France ==
Mothe Fénélon returned to France in 1583. He opposed the Protestants until the end of the reign of Henry III, but espoused the cause of Henry IV. He died in 1589.

== Writings ==
Fénelon was the author of a number of writings, among which those of general importance are:

- Mémoires touchant l'Angleterre et la Suisse, ou Sommaire de la négociation faite en Angleterre, l'an 1571 (containing a number of the letters of Charles and his mother, relating to Queen Elizabeth, Queen Mary and the Bartholomew massacre), published in the Mémoires of Castelnau (Paris, 1659)
- Négociations de la Mothe Fénelon et de Michel, sieur de Mauvissière, en Angleterre
- Dépêches de M. de la Mothe Fénelon, Instructions au sieur de la Mauvissière, contained with the above in the edition of Castelnau's Mémoires, published at Brussels in 1731.

The correspondence of Fénelon was published at Paris in 1838–1841.
