= Charles Louis Huguet, 1st Marquis of Sémonville =

French diplomat and politician

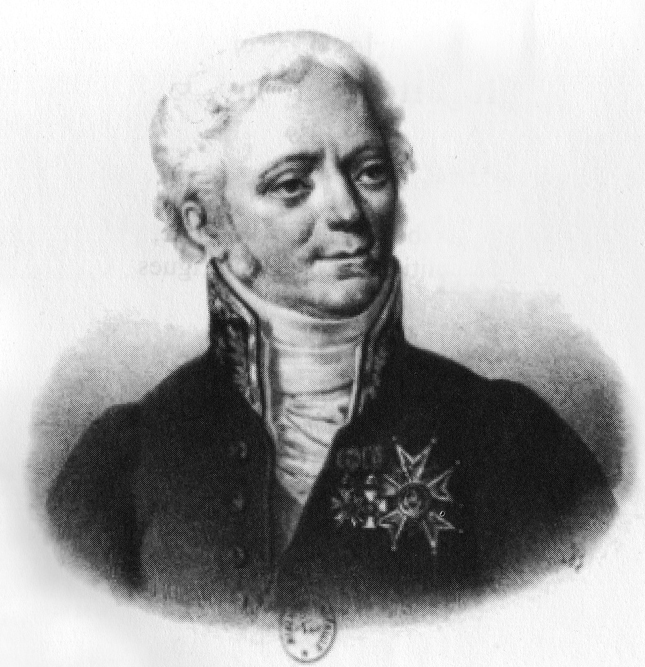
Charles-Louis Huguet de Sémonville

Charles Louis Huguet, 1st Marquis of Sémonville (9 March 1759 – 11 August 1839) was a French diplomat and politician. He was made a count of the First French Empire in 1808, and marquis in 1819.

== Biography ==
Born in Paris on as the son of one of the royal secretaries, he became Minister and Envoy Extraordinary of France to the Republic of Genoa in 1790–1791. He was instructed by Charles François Dumouriez to go to Turin and attempt to break off the alliance between Victor Amadeus III of Sardinia and the Habsburg monarchy, but was not permitted to cross the Sardinian frontier. Between 1792 and 1796, he was nominal ambassador to the Ottoman Empire, but he never occupied the post.

In 1793 he had started with Hugues-Bernard Maret for Italy where they had missions to the Grand Duchy of Tuscany and the Kingdom of Naples respectively, when the two envoys were kidnapped by Austrian orders in the Valtellina. They remained in the hotel Goldener Adler in Tyrol until December 1795, after that they were brought to Basel when there was an exchange of prisoners on the release of Madame Royale, daughter of the executed King Louis XVI, from the Temple prison.

In 1799 Napoleon Bonaparte, through whose influence his release had been obtained, sent him to as an envoy of the French Consulate to the Hague, in order to consolidate the alliance between France and the Batavian Republic. He was entirely successful, and he is credited with another diplomatic success in the negotiations leading to the "Austrian marriage" between Napoleon and Marie Louise of Habsburg.

Semonville accepted the Bourbon Restoration, and sat on the commission which drew up the Constitutional Charter. Treasured by Louis XVIII, he took no part in the Hundred Days; later on, he became on overt opponent of the Ultra-royalist policy of Charles X, but tried to save his throne during the July Revolution—with Antoine Maurice Apollinaire d'Argout, he visited the Tuileries Palace and persuaded the king to withdraw his ordinances and to summon the council. He died in Paris 9 years later.
