= Goldener Adler =

- Industry: Hotel
- Founded: 1390
- Headquarters: Herzog-Friedrich-Straße 6, 6020 Innsbruck, Austria
- Key people: Josef Hackl
- Website: www.goldeneradler.com

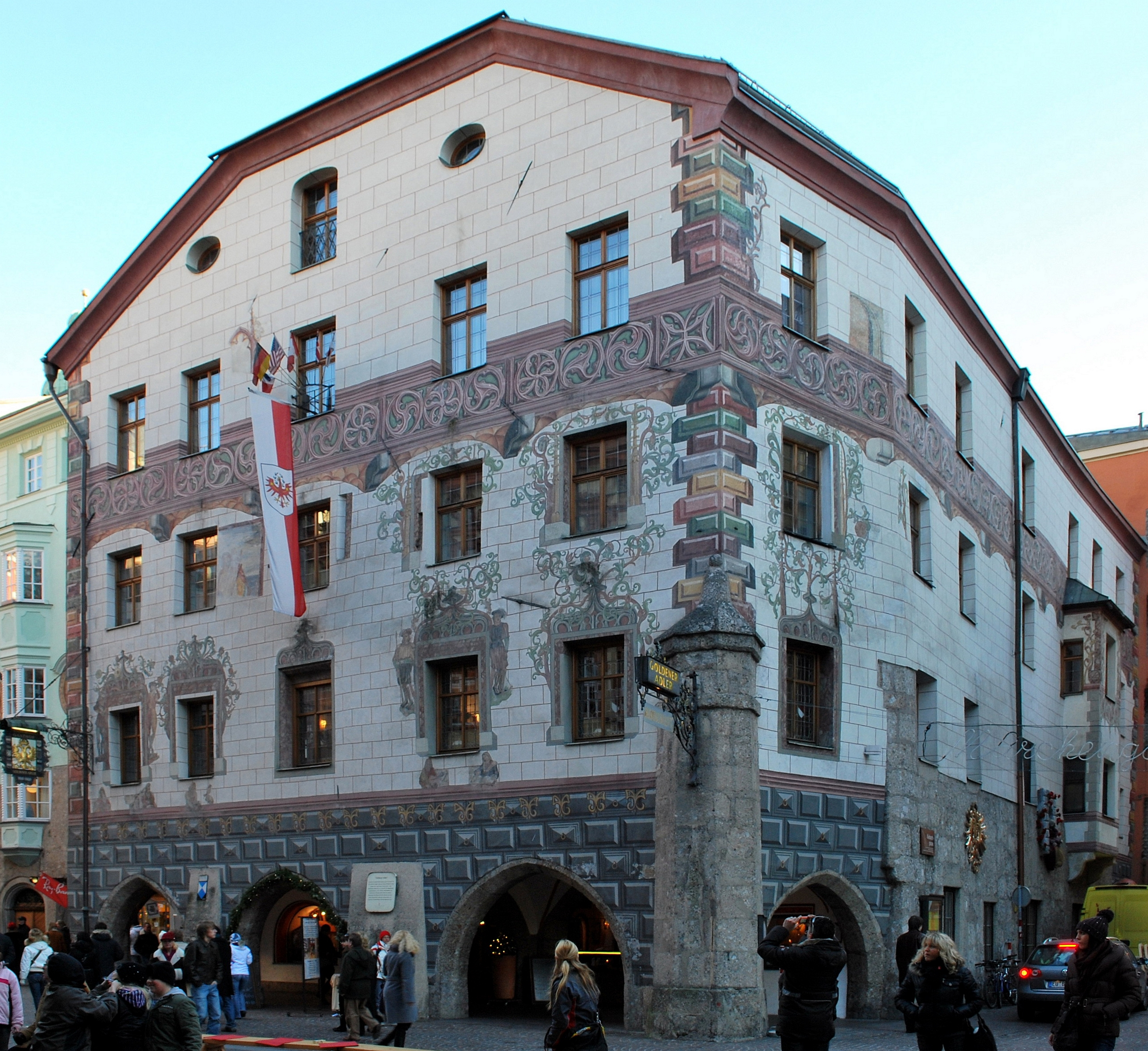
Hotel Goldener Adler

Goldener Adler is a traditional inn located in the historic center of Innsbruck city, Tyrol, Austria.

Since its foundation in 1390, many drivers and merchants who were looking for rest and shelter on their journeys between Italy and Germany were welcome.

== See also ==
- List of oldest companies
