= André-François Bourbeau =

Canadian survivalist

Andre-Francois Bourbeau is a noted Canadian survival expert and professor emeritus at the Université du Québec à Chicoutimi. Bourbeau co-founded the survival skills Outdoor Adventure Program (also called the Outdoors Pursuits and Adventure Tourism Program) at that university and taught there for more than 30 years. The students at the Université du Québec à Chicoutimi have affectionately given Bourbeau the nickname "Doc Survival" due to his skills.

== Biography ==
Bourbeau was born in Saint-Jean-sur-Richelieu, Quebec, and raised in the 200-person village of Spragge north of Lake Huron in central Ontario. He is the eldest son of Georges Bourbeau and Gertrude Bourbeau. Georges Bourbeau was a culinary professor and placement officer at the Provincial Institute of Trade (now George Brown College). Georges Bourbeau founded a meal-services business called G.B. Catering in 1969 (still in business today), catering initially to Camp Shalom, a Jewish children's summer camp. Gertrude was a professional baker.

Bourbeau started traveling with his father's catering business for summer camps as dishwasher and assistant cook, and became noted for eating unfamiliar berries, plants and roots and acting out survivalist scenarios with little or no food or tools at this young age. He completed a B.A. in mathematics and physical education at the University of Toronto. In the 1970s, Bourbeau taught at a high school in Thornhill, Ontario.

Bourbeau then completed a master's degree in outdoors education and a PhD in survival education (completed 1981) at the University of Northern Colorado in the school of educational change and development.

Bourbeau then took a faculty position at the Université du Québec à Chicoutimi, initially intending only to stay for a short time, but he "fell in love with the rugged Saguenay region, with its 15 whitewater rivers nearby and ample opportunities for living in the bush". As a professor, Bourbeau launched an undergraduate program in outdoor leadership at the Université du Québec à Chicoutimi in 1995, with physical education professor Mario Bilodeau. Bilodeau described their close relationship as tag team of different personalities, saying that "André-François was a bulldozer who broke down doors, and I was a carpenter who fixed them." Bourbeau was also noted for being strongly opposed to cigarette smoking from the very start of his career at Universite du Quebec a Chicoutimi.

This outdoor education program at the Universite du Quebec a Chicoutimi and Bourbeau himself were cited favorably by Henderson and Potter in their 2001 review of outdoor adventure education programs in Canada; Bourbeau's program was described positively as an example of a program that teaches "primitive wilderness survival" with minimal dependence on modern materials and tools that fosters a greater sense of connectedness to nature and uses less expensive methods (most Canadian programs use relatively modern equipment).

Bourbeau and Bilodeau both retired in 2011. Upon Bourbeau's retirement on August 1, 2011, he was profiled in La Presse (on June 26, 2011) as a pioneer of outdoors education and teacher to dozens of students. After retirement, Bourbeau continued to conduct research in survival-related topics and field work, such as the construction of a dugout canoe from scratch using an old Estonian method.

Bourbeau also developed a packaged dry food system for his father's G.B. Catering food services company, called the "G.B. Tripping System" in the late 1970s.

November 2013, Bourbeau was interviewed by QMI Agency (Quebecor Media) as a survival expert, discussing the situation of Marco Lavoie, an outdoorsman and hiker who survived a bear attack and decided to sacrifice and eat his German Shepherd after surviving for 3 months in the wilderness near James Bay. Bourbeau said that Lavoie survived because he made "good decisions" and that sacrificing his pet was one of those decisions. Bourbeau told the Ottawa Sun on October 31, 2013, that Lavoie's hope in a friend (who was informed of Lavoie's planned date of return to civilization) also played an important role in his survival.

== Guinness World Record ==
Bourbeau is noted for holding the Guinness World Record for longest voluntary wilderness survival of 31 days, a record he held for nearly 30 years.

== Books ==
Bourbeau is the author of four books on wilderness survival. These include Le Surviethon : Vingt-cinq ans plus tard, published in 2011 by JCL.

Bourbeau is the also the author of Wilderness Secrets Revealed: Adventures of a Survivor, a wilderness survival book published in 2013 by Dundurn Group that describes his lifetime of survival adventures since his childhood frog-hunting and canoeing with his father. This book's foreword is written by a colleague of Bourbeau's, Les Stroud, a noted Canadian survival expert in his own right.

Boubeau was interviewed by Radio Canada as a noted survival expert twice, in November 2013 on its Breakaway program concerning this book, concerning his world record, and concerning Marc Lavoie's situation (described above). and in September 2013 about his canoe research.

== Profiles of Nature episode ==
Bourbeau's survival teachings and his successful world record attempt are the subject of an episode of Profiles of Nature, a Canadian wildlife documentary television series. This episode won a bronze medal at the Houston International Film Festival.
