= Louis de Revol =

1st French Foreign Minister

- Born: 1531
- Died: 1594 (aged 62–63)

Louis de Revol (1531 – 24 September 1594) was the first French Foreign Minister from 1589 until his death in 1594. He is considered world's first foreign minister entrusted with all foreign relations.

== Life and career ==
He was born in Saint Pierre de Paladru (Isère), the son of Pierre and Marguerite Revol Pelissone. After Henry III created the office, Revol was appointed its first minister. He had previously served as one of four state secretaries. Revol was the first incumbent of the Ministry and saw the King every day at 5:00 am. Revol oversaw a commis and six clerks.

- Secretary of State of the Maison du Roi from 1588 to 1594 under Henri IV
- Secretary of State for Foreign Affairs from 15 September 1588 to 24 September 1594 under Henry IV
- Secretary of State for War from 1 January 1589 to 1594 under Henry IV

Political offices
Preceded by Nicolas de Neufville, seigneur de Villeroy	Minister of Foreign Affairs; 1 January 1589 – 17 September 1594	Succeeded by Nicolas de Neufville, seigneur de Villeroy
