= Jean Baptiste Noël Bouchotte =

French politician (1754–1840)

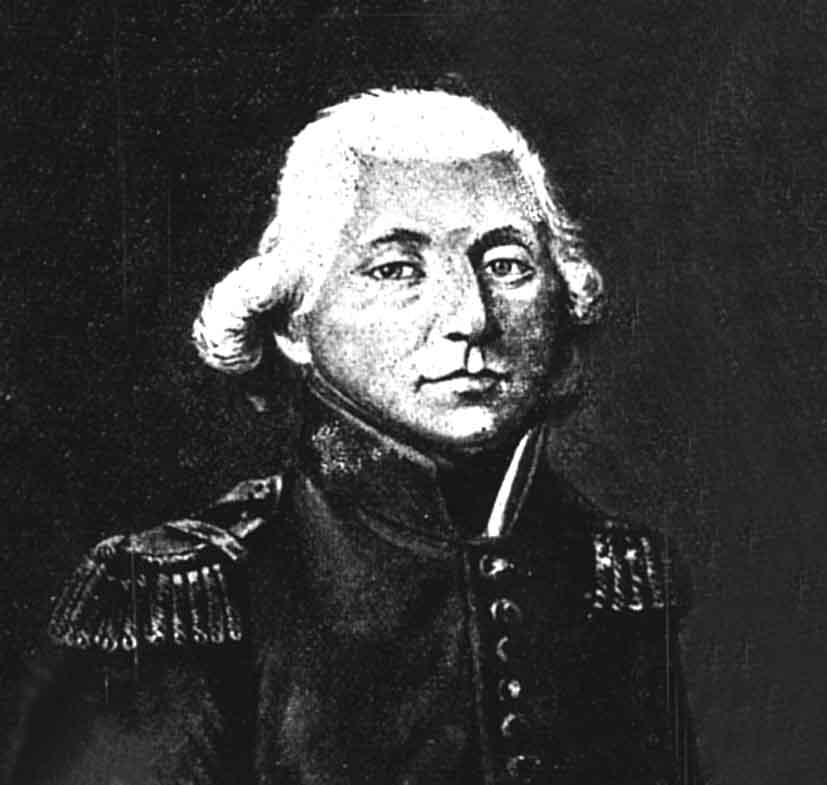

11th Minister of War
- In office 4 April 1793 – 20 April 1794
- Preceded by: Pierre Henri Hélène Marie Lebrun-Tondu
- Succeeded by: Jean-Baptiste Aubert-Dubayet

Personal details
- Born: 25 December 1754 Metz, France
- Died: 8 June 1840 (aged 85) Le Ban-Saint-Martin, France

Military service
- Allegiance: Kingdom of France; Kingdom of the French; French First Republic
- Years of service: 1773–1794
- Rank: Colonel
- Battles/wars: French Revolutionary Wars

Jean Baptiste Noël Bouchotte (French: [ʒɑ̃ batist nɔɛl buʃɔt]; 25 December 1754 – 8 June 1840) was a minister in the government of the French First Republic. He was born in Metz.

At the outbreak of the Revolution he was a captain of cavalry, and his zeal led to his being made colonel and given the command at Cambrai. When Dumouriez delivered up to the Austrians the minister of war, the marquis de Beurnonville, in April 1793, Bouchotte, who had bravely defended Cambrai, was called by the Convention to be minister of war, where he remained until 31 March 1794.

The predominant role of the Committee of Public Safety during that period did not leave much scope for the new minister, yet he rendered some services in the organization of the republican armies, and chose his officers with insight, among them Kléber, Masséna, Moreau and Bonaparte.

During the Thermidorian Reaction, in spite of his incontestable honesty, he was accused by the anti-revolutionists. He was tried by the tribunal of the Eure-et-Loir and acquitted. Then he withdrew from politics, and lived in retirement until his death.

Political offices
Preceded by Pierre Henri Hélène Marie Lebrun-Tondu	Secretary of State for War; 4 April 1793 – 20 April 1794	Succeeded by Jean-Baptiste Aubert-Dubayet
