= Claude de l'Aubespine, baron of Châteauneuf =

French diplomat and Secretary of State (1510–1567)

Claude II de l’Aubespine
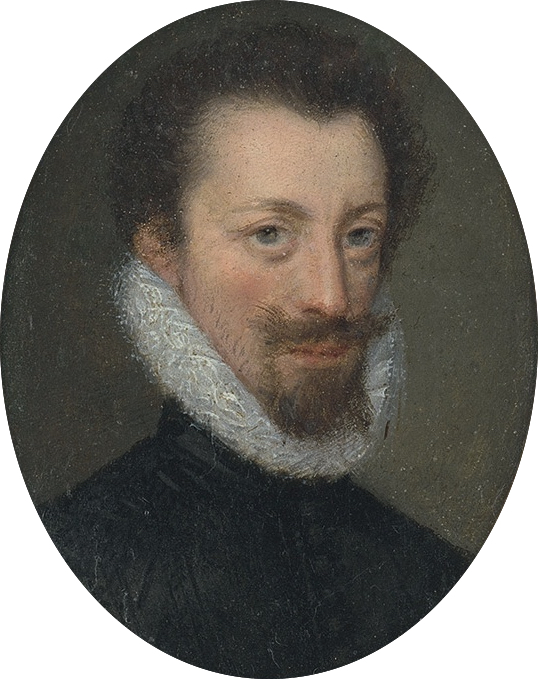
- Preceded by: Unknown
- Succeeded by: Nicolas de Neufville, seigneur de Villeroy

Secretary of State for the Navy
- In office 1 April 1547 – 1567

Secretary of State for Foreign Affairs
- In office 1 April 1547 – 1567

Personal details
- Born: 1510
- Died: 11 November 1567 (aged 56–57)
- Occupation: Diplomat, Secretary of State

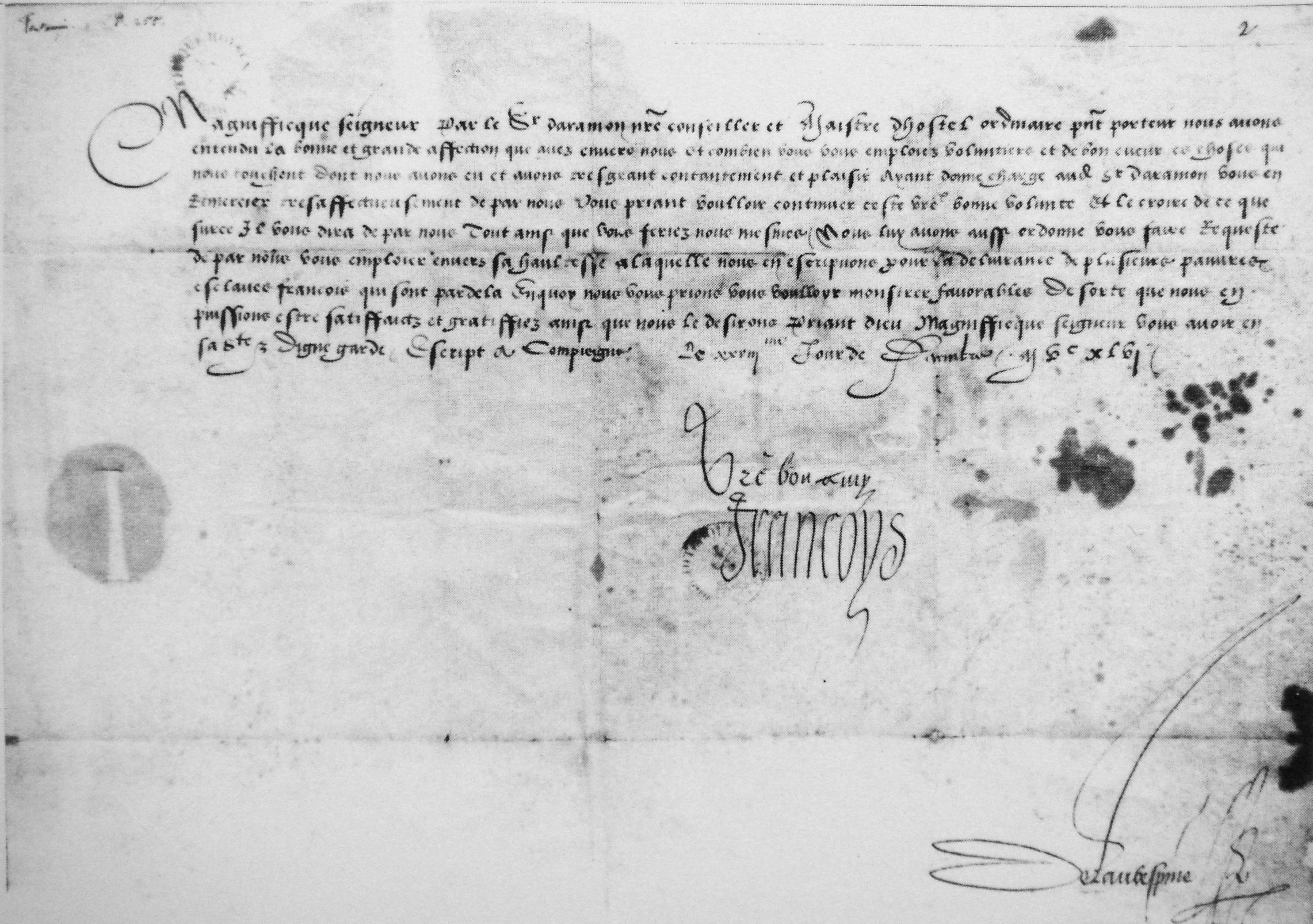
Letter of Francis I to the Ottoman Drogman Janus Bey, 28 December 1546, delivered by D'Aramon. The letter is countersigned by the State Secretary Claude de L'Aubespine (bottom right corner).

Claude II de l'Aubespine (1510 – 11 November 1567) was a French diplomat and Secretary of State. He was seigneur of Hauterive and of Forêt-Thaumieres and baron of Châteauneuf-sur-Loire.

== Life ==
From 1537 until 1567 he was one of the four Secretaries of State (ministers managing the government). He was one of the plenipotentiary of France to the Treaty of Cateau-Cambrésis, ending the Italian War of 1551–1559.

He served as secretary of state to kings Francis I, Henry II, Francis II and Charles IX.

He was associated with the Assembly of Notables at Fontainebleau, where he produced an edict of tolerance for reforms (1560) and the reddition de Bourges (1562).

== Family ==
Claude de l'Aubespine married Jeanne Bochetel, a daughter of the diplomat Guillaume Bochetel. Her brother Jacques Bochetel de la Forest, was a diplomat in London in the 1560s. Their children included:

- Madeleine de L'Aubépine (1546-1596).
- Guillaume de l'Aubespine de Châteauneuf (1547-1625), who was a diplomat in London, involved in the affairs of Mary, Queen of Scots.

== Sources ==
Political offices
Preceded by unknown	Secretary of State for the Navy; 1 April 1547–1567	Succeeded by Nicolas de Neufville, seigneur de Villeroy
Preceded by unknown	Secretary of State for Foreign Affairs; 1 April 1547–1567	Succeeded by Nicolas de Neufville, seigneur de Villeroy
