= André François Miot de Mélito =

French statesman and scholar

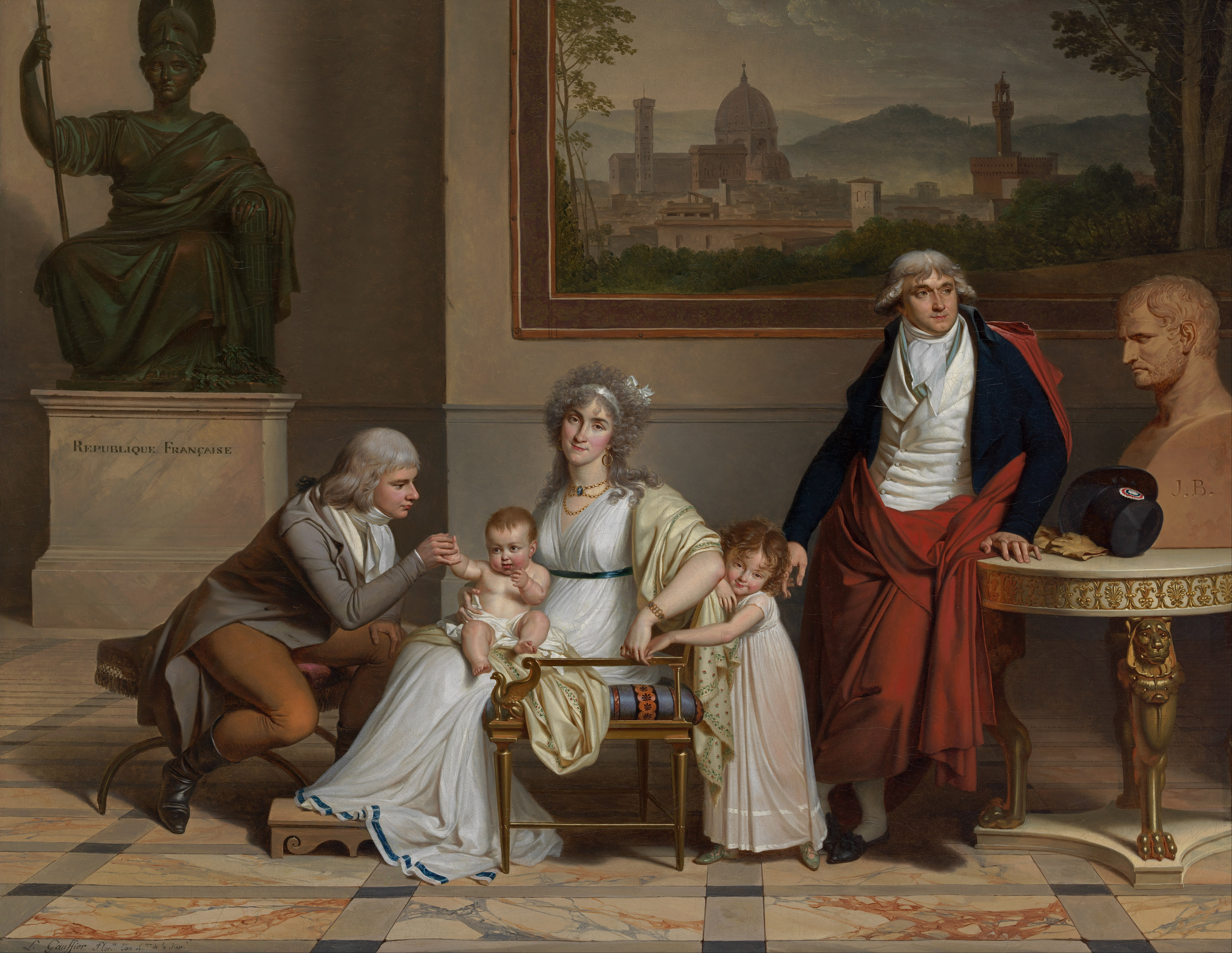
- Family of André-François Miot, painting by Louis Gauffier 1796
- Born: 9 February 1762
- Died: 1841 (aged 78–79)
- Occupation: statesman

André François Miot de Mélito (1762–1841) was a French statesman and scholar.

== Life ==
He was born at Versailles (Seine-et-Oise) on 9 February 1762. He was a high official in the war office before the Revolution, and under the Republic he eventually became secretary-general for foreign affairs. That he was not denounced under the Reign of Terror was due to the fact that he was indispensable in his department.

In 1795 he was sent as French envoy to Florence, then to Rome, and on his return to Florence received orders to proceed to Corsica, which, after its evacuation by the British, was in a state of anarchy. In Corsica he allied himself with Joseph Bonaparte, and after pacifying the island returned to Italy. Recalled by the Directory in 1798 because of his refusal to foment insurrection in Italy, he spent some time in retirement, but he was in the diplomatic service in the Netherlands at the revolution of 18 Brumaire (9 November 1799).

Under the Consulate he was secretary-general at the ministry of war, and a member of the council of state, and was sent on a second mission (1801–1802) for the pacification of Corsica. In 1806 he joined Joseph Bonaparte in Naples as minister of the interior, afterwards following him to Spain as Comptroller of the household, but he returned to France in the retreat of 1813. Next year he was created comte de Mélito, and during the Hundred Days he served as Commissary extraordinary with the XII. Army division. He took no part in politics after Waterloo, where his son-in-law, General J. B. Jamin, was killed, and his own son mortally wounded. He visited Joseph Bonaparte in America in 1825, and then spent some years in Germany with his daughter, whose second husband, General von Fleischmann, represented the king of Württemberg in Paris in 1831.

He was admitted in 1835 to the French Academy on the merits of his translations of Herodotus (Paris, 1822) and Diodorus (Paris, 1834-1838). He died in Paris on 5 January 1841.

Miot de Mélito had kept a diary, arranged for publication by his son-in-law, General von Fleischmann, which covers the years from 1788 to 1815, and is of interest for the history of the Bonaparte family and of Joseph's dominion in Spain. Published in France in 1858, it was translated into English by Mrs C. Hoey and J. Lillie (2 vols., 1881); and also into German (Stuttgart, 1866-1867) (see Albert Gaudin, Les Arrétés Miot; Ajaccio, 1896).
