= Samblançay =

Coat of Arms of Jacques de Beaune

Samblançay, or Semblançay, is a French noble family of Touraine, originally from the merchant class and taking their name from a village in Indre-et-Loire.

The founder of the family was Jean de Beaune (d. c. 1489), treasurer of Louis XI, who narrowly escaped death for conspiracy under Charles VIII. His son, Jacques de Beaune, baron de Semblançay, vicomte de Tours, became general of finances before 1497, and from 1518 was superintendent of finances. Convicted of peculation in connection with the supplies for the army in Italy, Jacques de Beaune was executed at Montfaucon on 9 August 1527. His eldest son, Martin de Beaune, who became archbishop of Tours in 1520, died in the same year as his father.

Another son, Guillaume de Beaune, general of finances under his father, and banished from 1527 to 1535, was the father of Renaud de Beaune (1527–1606), archbishop of Bourges (1581) and archbishop of Sens (1595). His efforts at pacification during the wars of religion culminated in the conversion of Henry IV, and it was he who presided at the ceremony of the king's abjuration of Protestantism on 25 July 1593. Renaud was one of the most famous orators of his time, and records of some of his speeches still exist, as well as his Reformation de l'université de Paris (1605 and 1667).

Another descendant of Jacques de Beaune was Charlotte de Sauve (c.1550–1617), a courtesan whom Catherine de' Medici employed to discover the secrets of her courtly enemies. She counted among her lovers and dupes the king of Navarre (Henry IV of France), the duc d'Alencon (Henry III.), Henry I., duc de Guise and others. The duc de Guise was killed as he left her apartments in the early morning of Christmas Day 1588. She was married early in life to Simon Fizes, baron de Sauves a secretary of state, and again in 1584 to François de la Tremoille, marquis de Noirmoutiers, by whom she had a son, Louis, 1st duc de Noirmoutiers, a ducal line which became extinct in 1733. Charlotte died on 30 September 1617.
