= Gibbet of Montfaucon =

Former structure that held gallows and gibbets

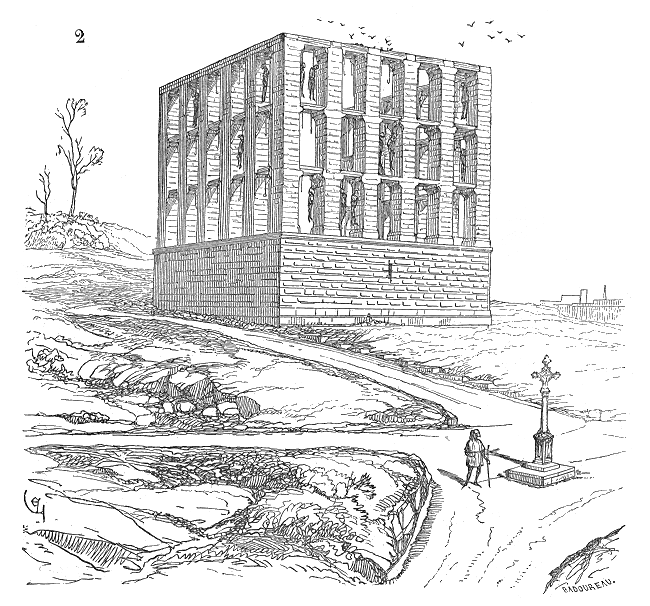
- 19th-century depiction of the Gibbet of Montfaucon long after it was taken down, by Viollet-le-Duc
- Interactive map of Gibbet of Montfaucon
- Location: Paris, France
- Coordinates: 48.8778°N 2.3680°E
- Type: Gallows
- Length: 12 to 14 m (39 to 46 ft)
- Width: 10 to 12 m (33 to 39 ft)
- Height: 4 to 6 m (13 to 20 ft)
- Completion date: Probably 13th century Destroyed 1760

The Gibbet of Montfaucon (French: Gibet de Montfaucon) was the main gallows and gibbet of the Kings of France until the time of Louis XIII. It was used to execute criminals, often traitors, by hanging and to display their dead bodies as a warning to the population. It was a large structure located at the top of a small hill near the modern Place du Colonel Fabien in Paris, though during the Middle Ages it was outside the city walls and the surrounding area was mostly not built up, being occupied by institutions like the Hôpital Saint-Louis from 1607, and earlier the Convent of the Filles-Dieu ("Daughters of God"), a home for 200 reformed prostitutes, and the leper colony of St Lazare.

First built during the reign of King Louis IX as a sign of royal justice in the late 13th century, the gibbet was later institutionalised under King Charles IV where the wooden scaffold was converted into stone with sixteen columns at a height of 10 meters. It was used until 1627 and then dismantled in 1760. A smaller gibbet was erected nearby for ceremonial purposes rather than for execution.

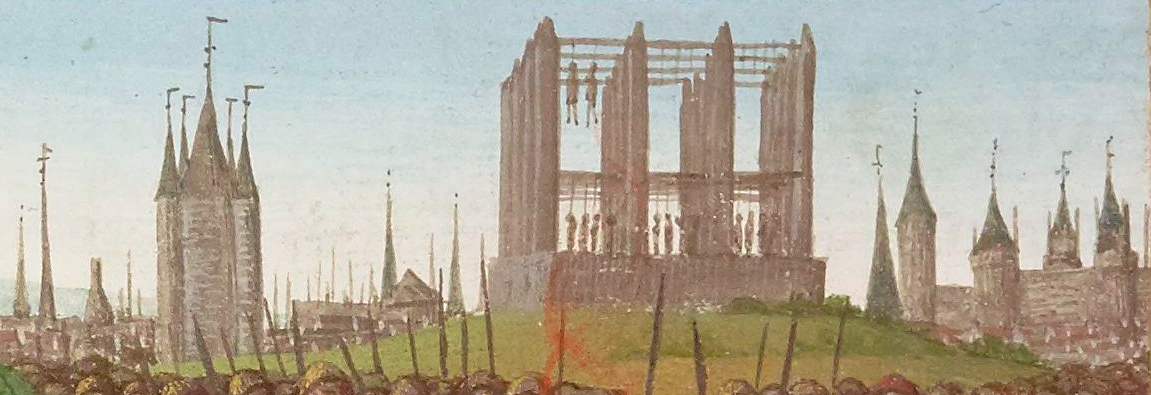
Detail from the Grandes Chroniques de France, by Jean Fouquet, about 1460

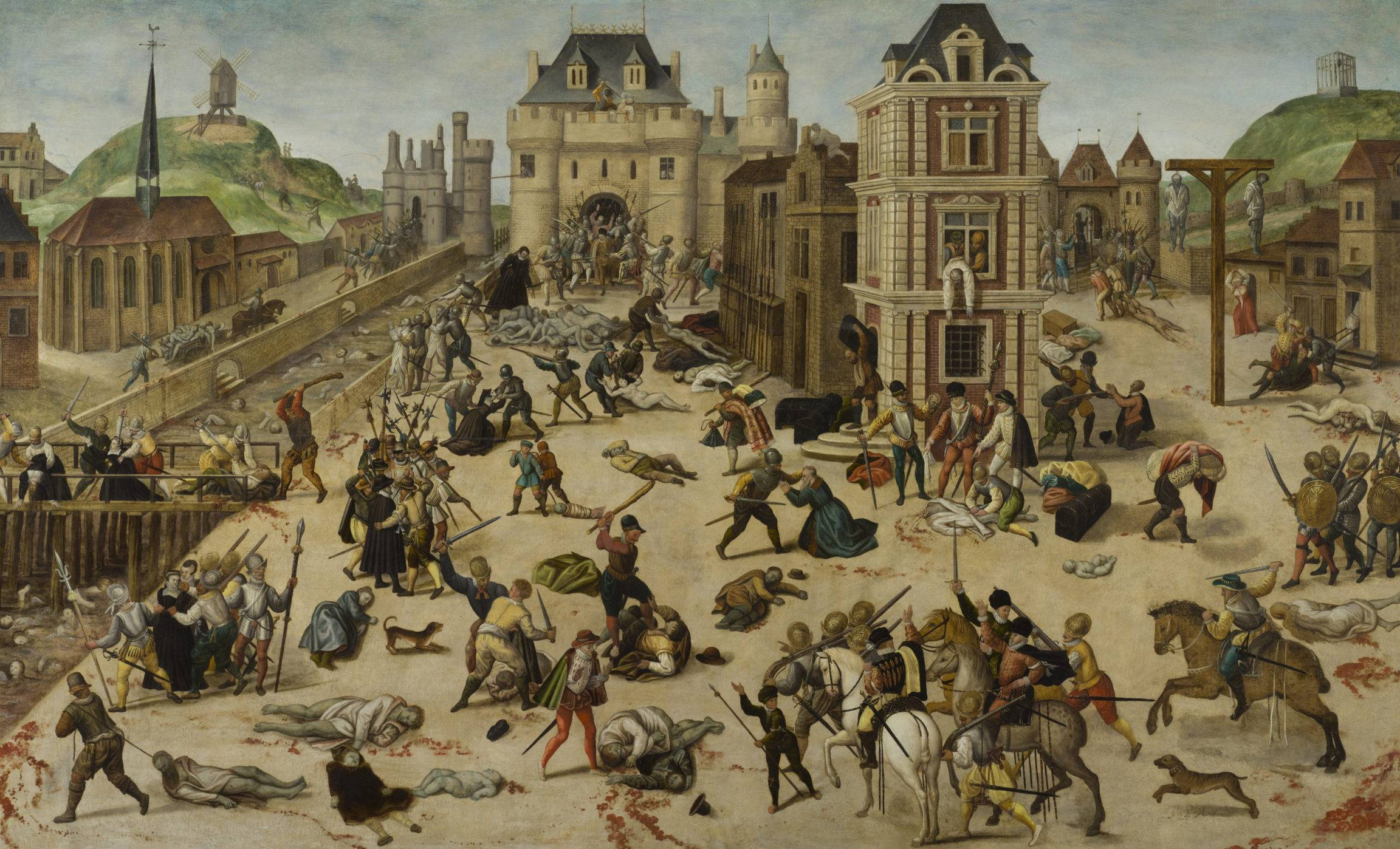
The St. Bartholomew's Day massacre in 1572, by François Dubois. The two top corners represent Montmartre with a windmill at left, and the Gibbet of Montfaucon on an equally steep and empty hill at right.

As reconstructed in images by Eugène Viollet-le-Duc it had three sides, and 45 compartments in which people could be both hanged and hung after execution elsewhere. A miniature of about 1460 from the Grandes Chroniques de France by Jean Fouquet, and also a print of 1609, show a somewhat less substantial structure than that in the reconstructions, which may, like others by Viollet-le-Duc, make the structure grander and more complex than was actually the case. The miniature shows bodies hanging from beams running across the central space, resting on the piers, but Viollet-le-Duc shows slabs running round the sides. Both show a substantial platform in masonry, which ran round a central space at ground level in the reconstructions, entered by a tunnel through the platform, closed by a gate. Another print of 1608 shows only two tiers of compartments rather than the three of Viollet-le-Duc. The English travel writer Thomas Coryat saw it at about the same time and described it as "the fairest gallows that I ever saw, built on a little hillocke ... [with] fourteen pillars of free stone".

The structure was also used for displaying the bodies of those executed elsewhere; in 1416 the remains of Pierre des Essarts were finally handed back to his family after three years at Montfaucon. Like an alarming number of other victims, Essarts had been one of the four royal treasurers.

The gibbet was a great favourite of popular historians and historical writers of the 19th century, appearing in historical novels including The Hunchback of Notre-Dame (1831) by Victor Hugo, Crichton (1837) by William Harrison Ainsworth, and La Reine Margot (1845) by Alexandre Dumas; both the last two tales centred on the St. Bartholomew's Day Massacre. The former site of the gibbet is featured in the 1996 video game Broken Sword: The Shadow of the Templars.

== Executions ==
Those executed or displayed there include:

- 1278: Pierre de La Brosse, favourite and grand chamberlain of King Philip III of France.
- 1315: Enguerrand de Marigny, former treasurer for King Philip IV of France.
- 1322: Giraud Gayte, treasurer for King Philip V of France.
- 1322: Jourdain de l'Isle, Gascon brigand, nephew by marriage of Pope John XXII.
- 1328: Pierre de Rémi, seigneur de Montigny, treasurer for King Charles IV of France.
- 1378: Jacques de Rue, chamberlain of Charles II of Navarre.
- 1378: Pierre du Tertre, secretary of Charles II of Navarre.
- 1386: Jacques Le Gris, knight who was killed during a trial by combat versus Jean de Carrouges. His body was dragged to Montfaucon and displayed there after his death.
- 1409: Jean de Montagu, treasurer of King Charles VI of France.
- 1413: Pierre des Essarts, also treasurer for Charles VI.
- 1457: Regnier de Montigny, brigand from the "coquillard".
- 1460: Colin de Cayeux, brigand from the "coquillards".
- 1484: Olivier Le Daim, confidant of King Louis XI of France.
- 1525: Barbiton, Jean Charrot and Jean Lubbe, brigands.
- 1527: Jacques de Beaune, baron de Semblançay, vicomte de Tours, Surintendant des Finances for King Francis I of France.
- 1572: The body of Admiral Gaspard II de Coligny, slain in the St. Bartholomew's Day massacre, was displayed there, hung by the feet.
