= Florimond Robertet =

Florimond Robertet may refer to:

- Florimond I Robertet (died 1527), treasurer of France after 1501
- Florimond II Robertet, seigneur de Fresne (1531–1567), French secretary of state to Francis II and Charles IX
- Florimond III Robertet d'Alluye (died 1569), counsellor of French kings Henry II and Francis II
