= Isabelle de Limeuil =

French noblewoman (c. 1535 – 1609)

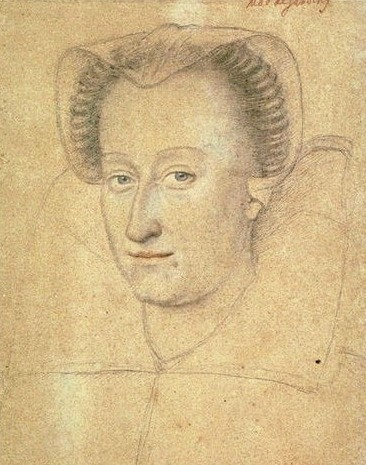
- Portrait of Isabelle de Limeuil
- Born: Isabelle de la Tour c. 1535; Limeuil, Aquitaine, France
- Died: 25 March 1609 (age 74); Paris, France
- Occupation: Maid of Honour
- Known for: French courtesan Member of Catherine de' Medici's "Flying Squadron"
- Title: Lady of Limeuil; Madame Sardiny; Viscountess of Buzancy; Baroness of Chaumont-sur-Loire
- Spouse(s): Scipion Sardini, Viscount de Buzancy and Baron of Chaumont-sur-Loire
- Children: Nicolas Sardini; Alexandre-Paul Sardini, Viscount of Buzancy and Baron of Chaumont-sur-Loire; Paul Sardini; Madeleine Sardini

Isabelle de la Tour, Lady of Limeuil (c. 1535 – 25 March 1609) was a French noblewoman and a Maid of Honour to the Queen Mother Catherine de' Medici. She also formed part of Catherine's notorious "flying squadron" (L'escadron volant), a group of beautiful female spies she used for the purpose of forming sexual liaisons with various powerful men at the French court thereby extracting information which would then be passed on to her. In about 1562 at Catherine's instigation, she became the mistress of Louis, Prince of Condé, brother of King Antoine of Navarre and one of the leading Huguenots in France. Two years later when Isabelle created a scandal by giving birth to his son whilst the court was on a royal progress, she was banished to a convent.

She later married wealthy Tuscan banker Scipion Sardini, a favoured protégé of Catherine de' Medici.

== Family ==
Isabelle was born in Limeuil, France in about 1535, a daughter of Gilles de la Tour, Viscount of Turenne, Baron of Limeuil and Marguerite de la Cropte, Lady of Lanquais. She went to live at the court of King Charles IX where she became one of queen mother Catherine de' Medici's Maids of Honour. Isabelle was distantly related to Catherine through the latter's French mother, Madeleine de La Tour d'Auvergne.

== Flying Squadron ==
Described as beautiful with blonde hair, blue eyes, rose-pink complexion and possessed of a "vivacious wit", she was immortalised in verse by the poet Pierre de Ronsard. He wrote that he "would like to give her as many kisses as there were leaves on the trees of the forest". Her outstanding good looks caught the attention of the Queen Mother who invited her to join her elite "flying squadron" (L'escadron volant), a group of attractive and talented female spies who were recruited to seduce powerful men at Court, thereby extracting information which would then be passed on to Catherine and used as political leverage by the latter. Catherine was keenly aware of the power and influence women were able to wield over men – knowledge she had acquired from observing her late husband, King Henry II, fall completely under the sway of his cultured mistress Diane de Poitiers. She set out establishing this select group of about eighty beautiful ladies-in-waiting whom she had dressed at all times "like goddesses in silk and gold cloth". They took active roles in Catherine's fantastic spectacles and magnificent entertainments which were regularly put on for the benefit of the court. At one lavish outdoor banquet held at the Château de Chenonceau, the male guests were served by ladies with bared breasts. The members of the "Flying Squadron" were encouraged to form sexual liaisons with the most influential men at court on whom they would spy for the Queen Mother.

Isabelle's first lover was Claude, Duke of Aumale, a member of the House of Guise, who were Catherine's greatest rivals. The duke was followed by Florimond Robertet, Catherine's secretary and a Guise associate. In about 1562 at Catherine's instigation, she seduced the prominent Huguenot, Louis, Prince of Condé, who was also the brother of King Antoine of Navarre. Antoine was the husband of Queen Jeanne of Navarre, another implacable adversary of Catherine and the political leader of the French Huguenot movement. Years earlier, Catherine had assigned another "Flying Squadron" member, Louise de La Béraudière de l'Isle Rouhet to attach herself to Antoine. This led Queen Jeanne to later denounce Catherine's court in a letter to her son, the future Henry IV of France, "Here it is the women who make advances to the men, rather than the other way around". Despite his mother's warnings about the brazen women who frequented the French court, Henry himself would succumb to the sophisticated charms of Charlotte de Sauve, whom author Mark Strage described as having been "one of the most accomplished members of L'escadron volant.

Much to Catherine's satisfaction, Condé fell passionately in love with Isabelle, whose beauty and sensuality so ensnared him that he neglected to attend Protestant religious services at court. However, her dominance over him came to an end in May 1564 when she gave birth to his son in the Queen Mother's chamber at Dijon while the court was on a royal progress. The scandal threw Catherine into a rage. Although the ladies of her "flying squadron" were used for the specific purpose to act as spies by forming sexual relationships at court, they were required to be discreet and decorous in public and above all to avoid pregnancy at all costs. Isabelle added fuel to the fire by loudly proclaiming Condé as the infant's father and even went so far as to send the baby to him in a basket. Condé vociferously denounced paternity, and Catherine angrily dismissed her from court. Isabelle was forced to enter a convent in Auxonne. To justify Catherine's harsh treatment of her, it was claimed that Isabelle had attempted to poison her rejected suitor, the Prince de la Roche-sur-Yon, as well as the elderly Constable of France, Anne de Montmorency.

In May 1564, Charles Robert de la Marck, count de Maulevrier, made a statement about Isabelle de Limeuil, claiming that she had offered to ally with him to poison their common enemy, Charles, Prince of La Roche-sur-Yon. He claimed that Limeuil felt persecuted by the prince, whom she alleged pressured his wife Philippes de Montespedon, who was the Première dame d'honneur responsible for the ladies-in-waiting, to control and oppress the ladies-in-waiting: "The said princess, at the behest of the said prince her husband, aside from the pains that she gave to all the maids of the Queen, seemed to have a particular animosity towards her and tried to verify whether she was pregnant, often tormenting her in front of the Queen on this matter and others."

Two months after Isabelle gave birth to his child, Condé's wife, Eléanor de Roucy de Roye, died. He chose as his second wife a young Huguenot of noble birth, Françoise d'Orleans-Longueville. By then he had broken completely with Isabelle, who never forgave his rejection of her and his denial of her son's paternity. The baby did not survive early infancy and died on an unknown date.

== Marriage and issue ==
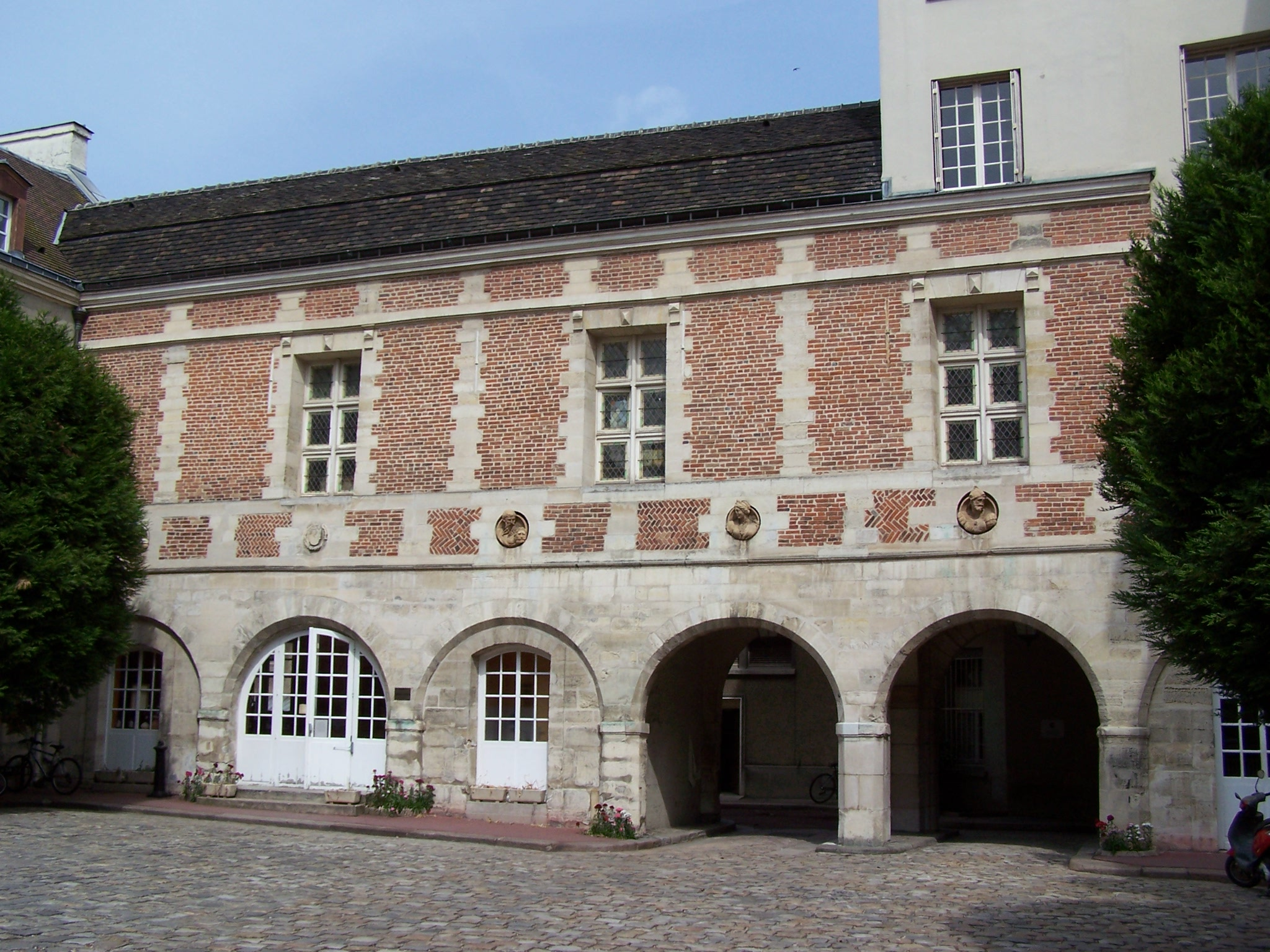
The courtyard of the Hôtel Scipion in Paris, the principal residence of Isabelle and her family

Isabelle was eventually allowed to leave the convent and in 1567 at the age of approximately 32 she married one of Catherine's protégés. He was Scipion Sardini, a wealthy banker originally from Catherine's native Tuscany. Upon her marriage, Isabelle was styled "Madame Sardiny". She and her husband made their home at the "Hôtel Scipion", Sardini's mansion on the Rue Scipion in Paris which he had built in 1565.

On 13 March 1569 Isabelle's erstwhile lover, the Prince of Condé was killed at the Battle of Jarnac during the Third War of Religion. When informed of his death, she tersely replied, "enfin" ("finally").

Sardini was ennobled by Charles IX who created him "Viscount of Buzancy". This made Isabelle by marriage the "Viscountess of Buzancy".

She bore her husband three sons and a daughter:

- Nicolas Sardini, Siegneur de Prunay
- Alexander-Paul Sardini (1574-1645), Baron of Chaumont-sur-Loire, Viscount of Buzancy; left descendants
- Paul Sardini (died 1667); left descendants
- Madeleine Sardini

In 1600, the viscount purchased the Château de Chaumont whose previous owners included Catherine de' Medici and Diane de Poitiers. Isabelle and her husband, however chose to live at the Hôtel Scipion. Sardini was given the title of "Baron of Chaumont-sur-Loire" which was passed on to their second eldest son, Alexander-Paul upon his death.

== Death and legacy ==
Isabelle died in Paris on 25 March 1609 and was buried in Chaumont-sur-Loire the following 1 April. Sardini died the same year.

She featured in Honoré de Balzac's satirical tale, La Chière nuictée d'amour in which her husband was the central character.

== Sources ==
- Babelon, Jean Pierre (1989). Châteaux de France au siècle de la Renaissance. Flammarion.
- McIlvenna, Una (2016). Scandal and Reputation at the Court of Catherine de Medici. Routledge.
