= Simon Fizes, baron de Sauves =

French politician (c. 1535–1579)

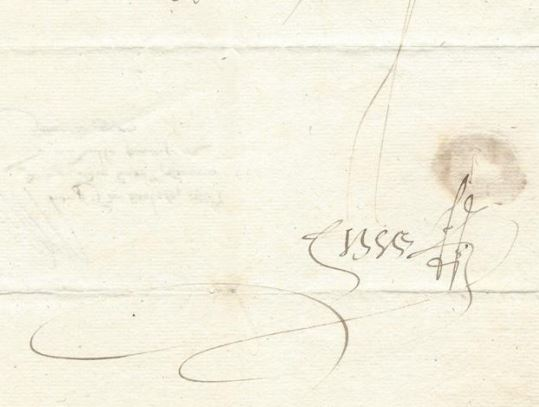
Autograph of Simon Fizes de Sauve

Simon Fizes, baron de Sauves (1535? - 27 November 1579) was a Secretary of State under Charles IX of France, and Henry III of France.

== Life ==
Originally from the region of Pézenas, he was the son of peasants taught by the church clerk, Jean de Rocoles; he became secretary to the Keeper, Jean Bertrand. In 1553, he became a Secretary of State. In 1559, he became Principal Private Secretary to Queen Catherine de Medici. In 1562-1563, he accompanied the Charles, Cardinal of Lorraine at the Council of Trent. In 1563, he bought the land and the title of Baron de Sauve, from the bishop of Montpellier. From 2 October 1567 to November 1579, he was Secretary of State for Foreign Affairs in charge of Denmark, Sweden and Poland, where he succeeded Florimond II Robertet, seigneur de Fresnes.

In 1569, he married Charlotte de Sauve, Viscountess of Tours (c. 1551 – 1617), daughter of Jacques de Beaune, Chevalier of the order of the king, gentleman of the bedchamber and chamberlain to the Duke of Anjou.

On 2 January 1573, he was appointed governor of Montpellier. In 1573, Charles IX gave him all his designs on St. Bartholomew's Day massacre, charging only that he keep all the news secret for that infamous day. In August 1574, he was an envoy by Henry III of France to negotiate about Piedmont, and restore contact between the new king, and queen mother. He was buried in the Church of the Celestines in Paris, in a small chapel on the right side of the great altar.

Political offices
Preceded by Florimond II Robertet, seigneur de Fresnes	Minister of Foreign Affairs; 22 October 1567 - 27 November 1579	Succeeded by Nicolas de Neufville, seigneur de Villeroy; Pierre Brûlart, seigneur de Genlis
