= Florimond III Robertet d'Alluye =

French Secretary of State (1533-1569)

Florimond III Robertet, Baron Alluye (1533–1569) was governor of Orléans, and Secretary of State to Francis II of France, and Charles IX of France.

== Biography ==
Robertet was born in Blois in 1533 to Claude Robertet and Anne Briçonnet. He was the grandson of Florimond I Robertet.

In 1557, he married Joan of Halluyn of Vienne, god-daughter of Catherine de Medici (she broke her secret marriage to François de Montmorency, to allow him to marry Diane de France). They had a child, Stephen Roberdet of Alluye. This is when the name was changed to Robertet for this branch of the family.

He was appointed Secretary of State in 1559 at the recommendation of Francis, Duke of Guise, under Francis II. He was committed to serving the Duke of Guise and Catherine de Medici, to whom he wrote in 1560 a letter expressing his concern with the budding wars of religion:

Madam, within a year, the fire will be even more up;

His cousin Robertet de Fresne succeeded his father-in Clausse Marchaumont. Thus, the two close relatives were at the same time, along with the offices of secretary of state, in two different departments. In April 1562, he and Robertet de Fresne were sent to Orléans with the Prince of Conde, who after the massacre of Vassy, seized Orléans, Blois, Tours, Angers and Le Mans. The prince said that he would not disarm if M. de Guise did not withdraw from the court, if not punished for the act of Vassy. In the same year, he was appointed by the queen mother and the princes of the House of Lorraine to go to the Duke of Savoy to maintain his neutrality, over the ruinous repayment by Turin and Piedmont that France: but the Duke of Guise wanted to please the Duchess of Savoy, and allied. In vain, Marshal Bourdillon and Marshal of Brissac opposed them. In 1563, he was sent to England to take Elizabeth I of England to visit Le Havre. The queen did not refuse to return the town, but wanted nothing less than Calais in exchange. A few months later, the Constable de Montmorency and a French army defeated the Earl of Warwick and the English. Florimond III d'Alluye died as Secretary of State in 1569, two years after his cousin Robertet de Fresne.

Political offices
Preceded by Jean du Thiers	Minister of Foreign Affairs; 22 October 1559 - 1569	Succeeded by Pierre Brûlart, seigneur de Genlis
