= Escadron volant =

Alleged spies of Catherine de' Medici of France

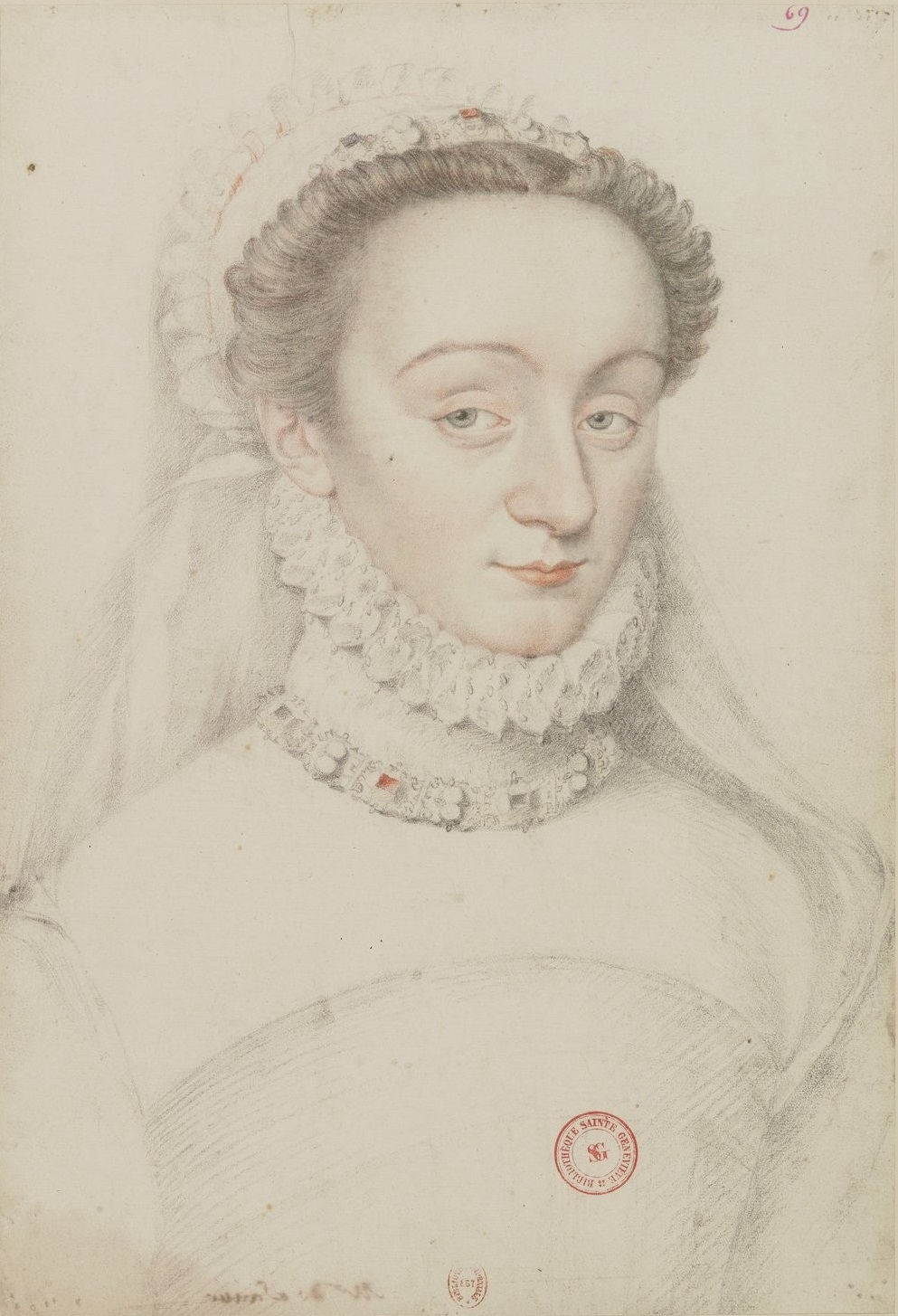
Charlotte de Sauve, a famous member of the Escadron volant.

Escadron volant ("[The] Flying squadron") was a term used in the propaganda against the queen-regent of France, Catherine de' Medici. It was a part of the Black Legend around Catherine de' Medici, alongside her alleged use of poison, witchcraft and political conspiracies.

The term stood for the beautiful ladies-in-waiting of the queen dowager, whom she is claimed to have specifically employed in order to use them as spies to further her political agenda by exploiting their beauty and sexuality.

== History ==
The French Protestants (Huguenots) referred to these ladies-in-waiting as "a stable of whores", who were prostituted by the queen-regent to further her political goals, and used it as an example of the decadence of the Catholic House of Valois.

The historical truth of the term is dubious. Queen Catherine de' Medici is known to have employed a famously large number of ladies-in-waiting; a larger number than most French queens. It was not uncommon for women of the royal court to have extramarital love affairs, which was socially accepted at court, as long as it was discreet. It is possible that Catherine de' Medici, when she noticed that one of her ladies-in-waiting where having an affair with a man of influence, attempted to use this fact by requesting her lady-in-waiting to obtain political favors or information from her lover. This is clearly known to have occurred in one case: during the affair between Catherine's lady-in-waiting Charlotte de Sauve and Henry of Navarre in 1572.

However, the notion that Catherine de' Medici employed ladies-in-waiting with the purpose of prostituting them by commanding them to have sexual affairs with men she selected for them to extract favors from them, is viewed as slander and political propaganda from misogynist political enemies of the queen-regent who wished to paint the Catholic Valois court as decadent. While Catherine de' Medici may indeed have attempted to use the love affairs of her ladies-in-waiting after the fact, she is unlikely to have planned and initiated them. On the contrary, she is known to have dismissed ladies who were not discreet with their love affairs, such as in the known case of Isabelle de Limeuil in 1564, and preferred to employ women who showed at least outward discretion, moderation and neutrality.

== See also ==
- Les Mignons
- Catherine de' Medici's court festivals
