= Jardin Musée de Limeuil =

Museum and botanical garden in France

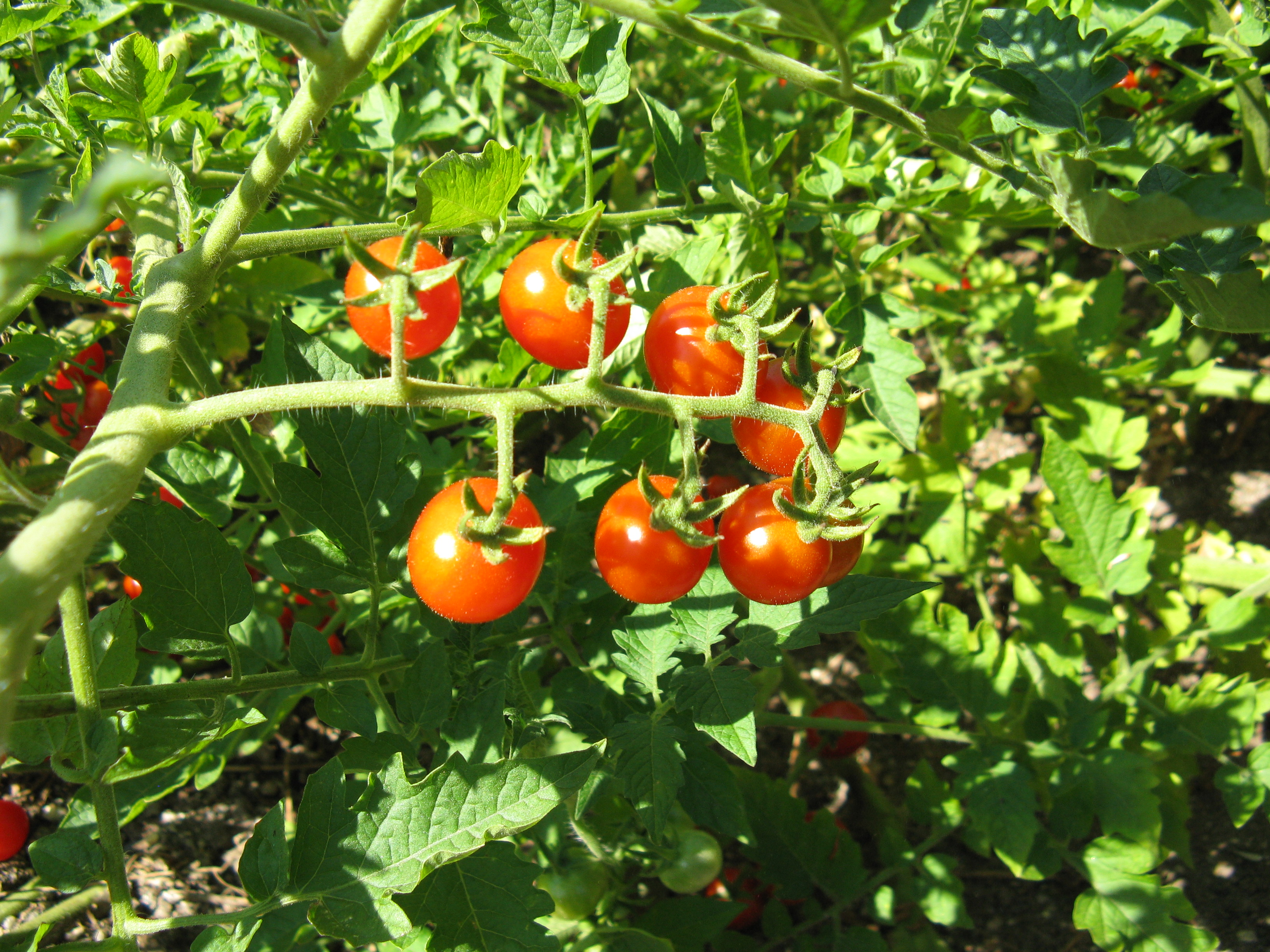
- Location: France
- Coordinates: 44°53′04″N 0°53′23″E
- Location of Jardin Musée de Limeuil

The Jardins Panoramiques de Limeuil, is botanical garden located in Limeuil, Dordogne, Aquitaine, France.

The garden was created in the 19th century by Doctor Linares. In 2004, the Au Fil du Temps association and the city of Limeuil restored it and opened it to the public.

== See also ==
- List of botanical gardens in France
