= Pierre Brûlart, seigneur de Genlis =

French statesman

Pierre Brûlart, Lord of Genlis and Crosne (c. 1535 – 12 April 1608) was a French statesman of the sixteenth century.

== Early life ==
Brûlart was born in c. 1535 into a noble house from St Martin at Blois. He was the son of Noel Brûlart, Lord of Crosne (d. 1557) and Isabeau Bourdin, Lady Chapet (d. 1589).

== Career ==
He was Secretary to the King in 1557, and commandments of Queen Catherine de' Medici in 1564. At the death of Florimond III Robertet d'Alluye, King Charles IX appointed him Secretary of State from 8 June 1569, serving until 1588, including under Charles IX's successor, Henri III.

He was at the king's marriage with Elizabeth of Austria. He read the contract and signed the ratification.

== Personal life ==
On 10 September 1571, he married Madeleine Chevalier (d. c. 1610). Together, they were the parents of:

- Gilles Brûlart, Lord of Genlis, Crosne, Abbécourt and Triel, Marizelle, Bichancourt, Bac, Arblincourt, etc., Bailiff of Chauny, Gentleman Ordinary of the King's Chamber, Dean of the King's Councillors at the Council of State; he married Anne de Halluin, a daughter of Charles, Lord of Piennes, Marquis of Maignelais, and Anne Chabot. After her death in 1607, he married Claude Aux-Epaules, a daughter of François, Lord of Pisy, and Gabrielle de Laval, Marquise of Nesle.
- Charles "Leon" Brûlart (d. 1649), canon of the Cathedral of Paris, advisor to the Parliament, Abbot of the Abbey of Saint-Pierre de Neauphle-le-Vieux and Joyenval, Prior of Léon, advisor to the Parliament, diplomat for Father Joseph, Ambassador at Venice and at the Diet of Regensburg in 1640, Advisor then Dean of the Council of State.
- Peter Brûlart, Abbot of Saint Martin d'Autun in Burgundy and of Joyenval, advisor to the Grand Council.
- Nicolas Brûlart (d. 1659), Lord of Broussin and Boulay, Baron of Orsonville, Poligny, Roussières and Souppes, chamberlain of Gaston, Duke of Orléans, Captain of a Cavalry Company in Holland; married Marie Cerisier, widow of Pierre Brulart, Lord of Vaux.
- Louis-Roger Brûlart (d. 1646), who married Madeleine Colbert, daughter of Oudard Colbert and cousin of Minister Jean-Baptiste Colbert.
- Magdalena Brûlart, who married François Robertet, chevalier, Lord and Baron d'Alluye, Bury and Corus.
- Nicolas Brûlart (d. 1659)
- Mary Brûlart (d. 1631), who married François de Mailloc, Lord and Baron of Mailloc, in 1587. After his death, she married François de Raveton, Lord of Chauvigny.
- Elizabeth Brûlart, a nun at Saint-Antoine-des-Champs in Paris.

The Lord of Genlis died on 12 April 1608.

Political offices
Preceded by Florimond III Robertet d'Alluye	Foreign Minister of France; 8 June 1569 – 1588	Succeeded by Louis de Revol
