= Olivier le Daim =

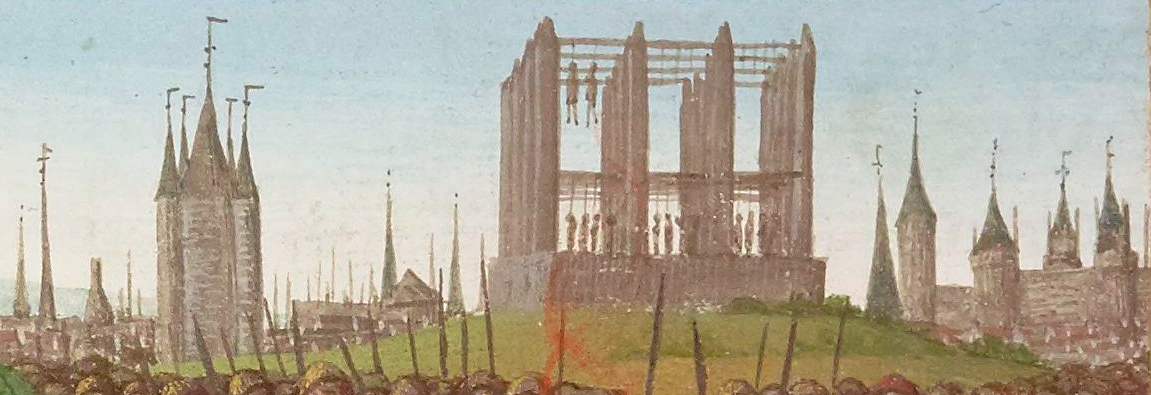
The Gallows of Montfaucon, (Viollet-le-Duc) detail Grandes Chroniques de France by Jean Fouquet, ca. 1460

Olivier le Daim (born Olivier de Neckere; c. 1428 – May 21, 1484) was a French favourite courtier and close advisor of King Louis XI.

== Life ==
He was born of humble parentage at Tielt in Flanders. His original surname was "de Neckere", that in Flemish means "evil spirit", giving him the nickname of "Olivier le Mauvais" ("Olivier the Wicked"). Seeking his fortune at Paris, he became court barber and valet to Louis XI, and so ingratiated himself with the king that in 1474 he was ennobled under the title Le Daim and in 1477 made comte de Meulan. In the latter year he was sent to Burgundy to influence Mary of Burgundy, the young heiress of Charles the Bold, but he was ridiculed and compelled to leave Ghent. He thereupon seized and held Tournai for the French.

Le Daim had considerable talent for intrigue, and, according to his enemies, could always be depended upon to execute the baser designs of the king. He amassed a large fortune, largely by oppression and violence, and was named gentleman-in-waiting, captain of Loches, and governor of Saint-Quentin. He remained in favour until the death of Louis XI, when the rebellious lords were able to avenge the slights and insults they had suffered in the hands of the royal barber. He was arrested on charges, the nature of which is uncertain, tried before the parlement of Paris, and on May 21, 1484, hanged at the Gallows of Montfaucon without the knowledge of Charles VIII, who might have heeded his father's request and spared the favourite. Le Daim's property was given to the Duke of Orléans.

Memoirs of his contemporaries include:

- Philippe de Commines (ed. Mandrot, 1901–1903, Eng. trans. in Bohn Library)
- Robert Gaguin, Compendium de origine et gestis Francorum (Paris, 1586) it was Gaguin who made the celebrated epigram concerning Le Daim: "Eras judex, lictor, et exitium."
- De Reiffenberg, Olivier le Daim (Brussels, 1829)
- Delanone, Le Barbier de Louis XI (Paris, 1832)
- G. Picot, "Procès d'Olivier le Daim", in the Comptes-rendus de l'Académie des sciences morales et politiques, viii. (1877), 485–537

The memoirs of the time are uniformly hostile to Le Daim.

== In popular culture ==
Le Daim plays a major role in book nine, chapter five of Victor Hugo's novel The Hunchback of Notre-Dame, being described as "that terrible Figaro whom Providence, the great maker of dramas, mingled so artistically in the long and bloody comedy of the reign of Louis XI."

Gustav von Seyffertitz plays le Daim in the silent film Yolanda (1924).
