= Jean Duthier =

16th-century French administrator

Jean Duthier, seigneur de Beauregard (died 1559), also called Jean du Thier, was Minister of Finance for King Henry II and a Secretary of State.

He was a great humanist and protector of the poets Joachim du Bellay and Pierre de Ronsard.

He bought the Château de Beauregard (Loire Valley), in 1545, for 2,000 gold ecus. Jean Duthiers was the real builder of the castle. He incorporated the old house in the new building and built in Renaissance style, the central gallery which connected the two buildings.

From 1553, he appealed to many foreign artists who were working for King Henry II. The painter Nicolò dell'Abbate decorated it with frescoes. Francesco Scibec da Carpi carved woodwork of the study, "the Cabinet of Jingle Bells" at the foot of the windows of the south wing. He showed a collection of rare plants.

Political offices
Preceded by unknown	Secretary of State for Foreign Affairs; 1547–1559	Succeeded by Florimond III Robertet d'Alluye
