= Limeuil =

- Commune
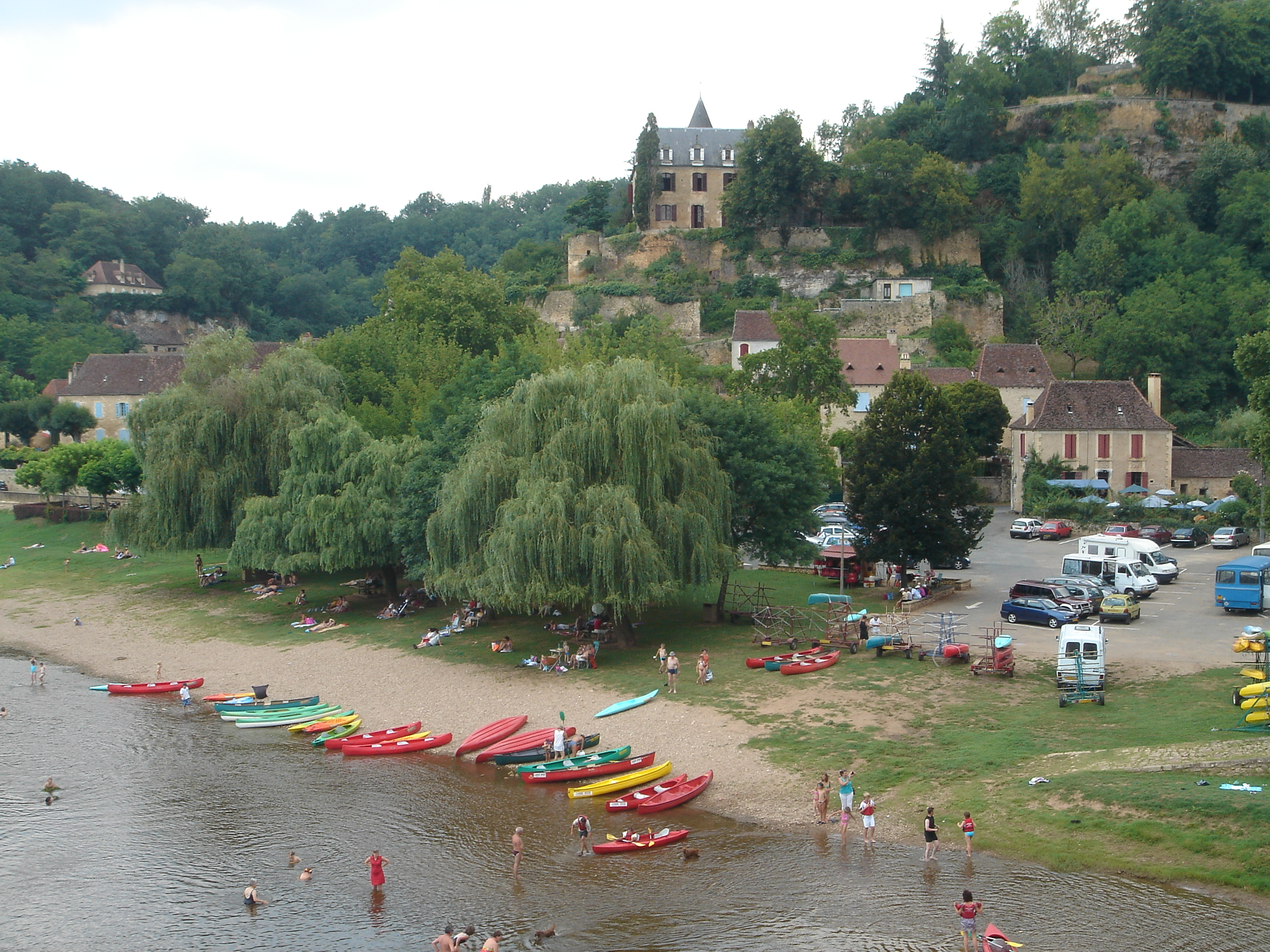
- Canoes on the bank of the Dordogne river in Limeuil

- Coat of arms
- Location of Limeuil
- Location within France Location within Nouvelle-Aquitaine
- Coordinates: 44°53′10″N 0°53′23″E
- Country: France
- Region: Nouvelle-Aquitaine
- Department: Dordogne
- Arrondissement: Sarlat-la-Canéda
- Canton: Périgord Central
- Intercommunality: Vallée de l'Homme

Government
  - Mayor (2020–2026): Jean-Claude Hervé
- Area^{1}: 10.57 km^{2} (4.08 sq mi)
- Elevation: 50 m (160 ft)
- Highest elevation: 200 m (660 ft)
- Lowest elevation: 45 m (148 ft)
- Population (2023): 342
  - Density: 32.4/km^{2} (83.8/sq mi)
- Time zone: UTC+01:00 (CET)
  - Summer (DST): UTC+02:00 (CEST)
- INSEE/Postal code: 24240 /24510
- ^{1} French Land Register data, which excludes lakes, ponds, glaciers > 1 km^{2} (0.386 sq mi or 247 acres) and river estuaries.

Limeuil (French pronunciation: [limœj]; Occitan: Limuèlh) is a commune in the Dordogne department in Nouvelle-Aquitaine in southwestern France.

Limeuil village is located at the confluence of the Dordogne and Vézère rivers. Historically this location at the meeting of the two major local rivers gave Limeuil immense importance – both commercially and strategically. In medieval times, the rivers were the highways of trade, and to be at the convergence of two of them was a unique advantage in the region: this was, historically, primarily a wine-producing area, much of the wine quite 'rough', but the casks of relatively better wine were delivered into the 'chais' at Limeuil, for subsequent delivery downstream to Bordeaux, on large, flat-bottomed 'gabarres' [See 'the wine trade', below]. The rivermen had to be accommodated here, and to this day the riverside bar/restaurant bears the name L'ancre de Salut – a boatsman's term meaning literally 'the safety anchor', a place where the rivermen could find food, wine, a bed, and rest, before their return up river. The church at the top of the village [there are two churches – see 'Churches' below] is, significantly, named after Ste Catherine, who was the patron saint of boat people. Strategically, Limeuil consequently had to defend itself (and its inhabitants) from the relentless waves of territory-grabbing that arose from the Hundred Years' War, and the Wars of Religion – endless 'chevauchées' [see 'Medieval Wars' below] that would see the locality relentlessly under attack, for over two hundred years (the so-called Hundred Years' War lasted, in fact, for 116 years!) The hillside promontory on which the village is situated provides a natural defence – and was surmounted by a chateau, enclosed within its defensive circular stone walls [see 'The Chateau'] below.

Today this unique medieval village remains almost intact, and has been completely restored by property owners, second-home buyers, and remaining old families. Unlike French Villages, which is left unreconstructed. When the river trade collapsed through the devastation of the vineyards caused by Phylloxera, [see 'Wine Production' below] and communication was overtaken, first by rough roads, and then in the last century by a network of trains, with the depopulation that followed the Second World War the village lost its purpose, and – apart from the agricultural work available to the families down on 'the plain' (the adjoining richly fertile river flood-plain) – the houses within the walled 'bourg' emptied, and consequently fell into dis-repair, even collapse. But the prehistoric stone of Périgord is indestructible. Three of the original four entrance gates into the defensively-walled village still stand; and beyond them you walk onto the river bank, or just out into green fields, as you would have done 800 years ago.

== History of the village ==
Behind the buildings that form the river frontage is a cave, not open to the public, which dates to the Magdalenian VI period (at least 12,000 years ago), and includes about 200 carvings in the limestone plates, as well as many carved antlers and other bones. The carvings are of a variety of animals, including a rare find, a fox. It therefore seems likely that there has been a settlement here for some 15,000 years. When the Celts arrived they named it "Lemoialum", meaning 'a place planted with elms'. The first crude fortification was constructed here by The Gauls, probably from wood – which was inevitably taken by the Romans when they arrived in the 50s BC (There remain traces of a Roman villa near the Chapelle St Martin in the valley). With the decline of the Roman Empire in the 8th century AD, the Vikings invaded, and the population moved from the valley, where they worked the land, up into the higher, safer levels of the hillside – with the first complete fortress (again probably constructed from wood) on the highest terrace. Over the next 200 years stone defensive walls were built around the fortress, and then around the village itself: most of these remain amazingly intact today. Three of the four entrance Gates survive (the 4th was demolished to enable a new road to access the upper village).

More recently, the English arrived in force with their King, Henry, Duke of Normandy, when he succeeded to the throne in 1154 – in 1152 he had married Aliénor Duchess of Aquitaine (now known as Eleanor). France became reduced to internal war between the two Royal houses – the Plantaganets from England, with their roots in Normandy and Anjou; and the Valois, from Provence. The ensuing 'Hundred Years' War' lasted off and on between 1137 and 1453, with Limeuil being allied to the English for most of that time. But in 1449 the tide had begun to turn, as the French adopted a strategy of 'battle avoidance', preferring instead the tactic known as chevauchée, which simply required the armies to surround a town and set up camp, sometimes for months, cutting off all supplies until the inhabitants surrendered. Anyone who might command a ransom (such as church dignitaries and aristocrats) were taken captive; and the rest were subjected to taxes and tithes. The last and deciding battle took place in 1453 at nearby Castillon, where the French cannons of Jean Bureau defeated the archers of John Talbot, Earl of Shrewsbury, who was himself killed in the field of battle. A century of relative calm followed, and the village houses were repaired and reconstructed [see 'The Chateau' below]. But from the middle of the 16th century bloodshed and chaos returned, as Catholics fought Protestants – a period known as the 'Wars of Religion'. Limeuil had both a Catholic monastery (a surviving part of which is now the Mairie building); and a Protestant convent and church, both of which have now disappeared – the church was destroyed in 1683 after the revocation of the Edict of Nantes: all that survives is an iron cross on an ancient stone pillar in the corner of the Place des Ormeaux in the upper village.

== The chateau ==
At some point the early wooden defensive stronghold was rebuilt in local stone, but little evidence of this chateau fortification survives within the walls of today's Parc du Chateau. Perhaps the most famous of the occupants of this chateau was Isabeau de Limeuil, the daughter of Gilles de la Tour, lord of Limeuil and Abbot of Vigeois (which is north-east of Excideuil). They were related to Catherine de' Medici, Queen of France, and Isabeau was a mistress of Louis I de Bourbon, and bore him children.

It is likely that this stone structure was demolished by the inhabitants themselves, sometime after 1453, as a clear demonstration that they had no wish to go on fighting these relentless defensive wars – as also happened with a number of other chateaux in the Périgord. Evidence of the truth of this theory can be seen in unexpected stone details set into some of the village houses; and two magnificent fireplaces bearing the Royal Coat of Arms, one in the Maison de la Justice in the upper village; and the other in the "Chais" restaurant down by the river. The castellated, rather Moorish-styled building that visitors to the Parc see today was constructed from remaining stones, by Dr. Fernand Linares, who was born in Limeuil in 1850; served the Sultan of Morocco, Mulay Hassan I, as his personal physician; and purchased the chateau parc for his retirement. Some 60 years after his death, the entire Parc was purchased by the villagers for €320,142. The building is now used for exhibitions and communal meetings; and the grounds are maintained and managed by a local 'patrimoine' conservation group, the Au Fil du Temps.

== Wine and the rivers ==
The hills around Limeuil are today densely wooded. But walk into these woods and you will find time-worn stone supported terraces. These used to be covered by hillside vineyards, thousands of acres of wine production, until the devastation of the Phylloxera insect infestation that destroyed most of the vineyards around 1880, with the consequential catastrophic loss of livelihood that resulted for thousands of peasant families. Wine in barrel was brought downstream to Limeuil from as far afield as the Massif Central on flat-bottomed 'gabarres', destined for the ocean-going port of Bordeaux. There were two types, known locally as courpets and courraus. The courpet was small, and could navigate from well up-river, to be dismembered on arrival, its timbers often re-used. The larger courreau was built to last 40 or 50 years, and was hauled back to Limeuil from Bordeaux by oxen and men, loaded with salt, fish, and other goods, to be offloaded into the chais buildings – there used to be a great Market Hall on the Place des Ormeaux in the upper village, now long gone.

The rivers were regularly prone to extensive flooding of the valleys through the winter – but could be walked across during the dry summer months (the Gateway arched entrance from the riverside is carved with the flood levels for particular years, an amazing record). The window of opportunity for the boatmen to work was therefore limited to only a couple of months in a year; and inevitably the development of roads, and then railways, brought to an end a centuries-old trade.

== Churches ==
There are two churches in the commune. At the top of the village is the original church, dedicated to Sainte Catherine, the patron Saint of boatmen. A church has stood on this site since the 1100s, but the building you now see dates from the 14th and 15th centuries. Inside you may see a darkened original effigy of the Virgin Mary, in a niche in the south wall – now a little damaged, because it was rescued from the depths of the river, where it was discovered, after having been thrown into the waters by Protestants during the Wars of Religion.

In the valley, on a slightly raised mound just above the old river flood levels, is the Chapelle St. Martin, known locally as 'the English church'. Unusually for this region, it is surrounded by its cemetery (more customarily they are separate from the churches, outside the village boundary). The Chapelle was built in 1194 reputedly on the order of King Richard 1 (the Lionheart) of England, as an earthly recompense for the murder by his father, Henry II, of Archbishop Thomas A'Becket in Canterbury Cathedral on 29 December 1170, 24 years earlier. It is difficult to substantiate this tradition. Indeed, at the time, Richard Lionheart had been held in captivity in Austria for two years, having been captured returning from the Holy Lands for the Third Crusade in 1191 – and he was only released because his mother, Queen Eléanor, raised a ransom equivalent to around 2 or 3 times the annual income of England. Richard had borne little love for his father – he actually spent his life trying to overthrow him, and take over his possessions in France, where he spent his life (he actually was unable to speak much English). The dedicatee of the chapelle, Saint Martin, has many churches named after him – he was a patron saint of France, and of soldiers, and lived in Tours, in the Loire valley.

== Post-revolution and into the 20th century ==
Following the Revolution in 1789, organised road and railway building gathered pace, to the detriment of the river traffic that Limeuil depended upon. Bridges were built across the two rivers in 1891, and the ferrymen who had for thousands of years taken people, livestock, and goods across the rivers at fixed points, lost their livelihoods (the cobbled slope of the ferry landing stage across the Dordogne at Limeuil can be seen just before the road turns sharp right at the end of the Mairie wall). Flooding was contained by the construction of a series of dams. The tradesmen, artisans, craftsmen, and shopkeepers who had serviced the river trade were no longer required. The village steadily declined in population.

This was Vichy France, occupied – by consent – by the Nazi army. The nearby railheads at Le Buisson became the regional logistics centre for the German occupiers. Just above Ste. Catherine's church is a pathway recorded as 'Love Lane' on the local authority cadastral plan: the 3 bedrooms of the balconied house on the left of the entrance to the lane were partitioned into 6, and the German soldiers were welcomed here with 'away-from-home' comforts. But the Resistance was very active here too – and amongst many local memorial stèle (memorial plaques) to those who paid the ultimate price for their patriotism, is one on the road at the bottom of the village.

== Tourism ==
After the War, tourism steadily gathered pace. As the old river-related trades had already died away, the youth of the village were largely more interested in moving out to the greater opportunities in Bordeaux and other large cities, and by the end of the Second World War there were only about 40 houses still occupied in the village. But derelict houses were steadily bought, to be restored by French, Dutch, English, German, South African, and Australian second-home owners. The Municipal Council of the commune obtained grants and other support to improve and maintain the public areas and facilities. The bourg (original walled community) was accepted as a member of the prestigious (entirely non-governmental) organisation Les Plus Beaux Villages de France and restaurants and artisans returned to service the needs of a growing flow of tourists – estimated in 2016 at about 100,000 visitors. The original village (of barely 30 permanent, year-round, residents now) has to endure all the inconvenience – as well as some benefits – of this mass inflow.

Many events are organised with the tourist visitor in mind – a weekly marché nocturne (an open-air meal, with entertainment, bought from an array of stalls cooking a wide variety of food) during the summer, in the Place du Port down alongside the river; art exhibitions in the Chateau Parc; a small weekly market; an immense Pottery Fair, one of the largest in France; a similarly large antique and bric'a'brac fair; to join the regular artisans – a glassblower, a potter, and a micro-brewery ('brasserie') – as well as local canoeing, horseriding, football, and pétanque.

== Population ==
Historical population
Year	Pop.	±% p.a.
1968	350	—
1975	317	−1.40%
1982	351	+1.47%
1990	335	−0.58%
1999	315	−0.68%
2007	345	+1.14%
2012	338	−0.41%
2017	336	−0.12%
2023	342	+0.30%
Source: INSEE

== Sights ==
- Jardin Musée de Limeuil

== See also ==
- Communes of the Dordogne department
