= Semblançay =

- Commune
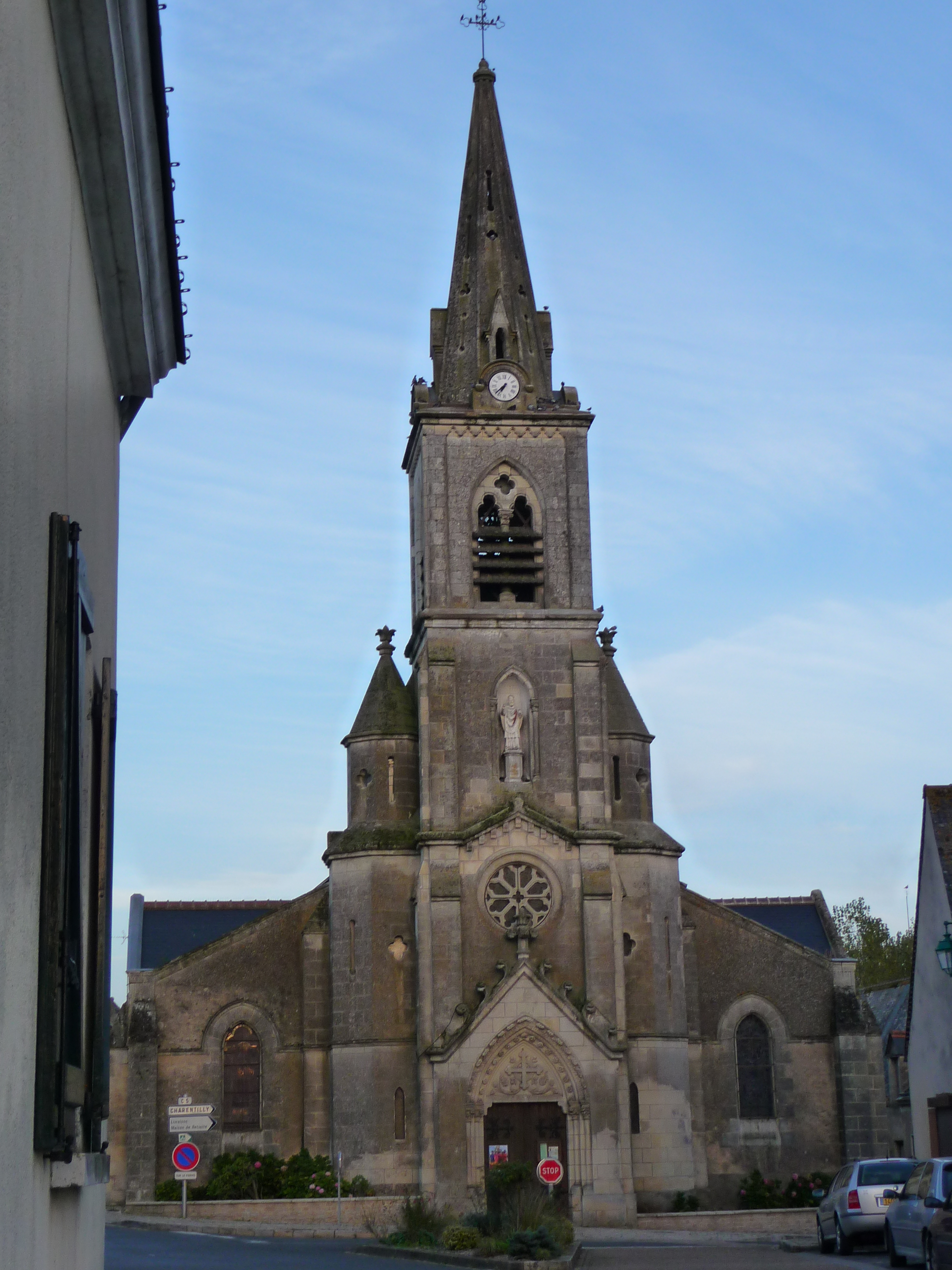
- The church in Semblançay

- Coat of arms
- Location of Semblançay
- Location within France Location within Centre-Val de Loire
- Coordinates: 47°29′59″N 0°34′52″E
- Country: France
- Region: Centre-Val de Loire
- Department: Indre-et-Loire
- Arrondissement: Chinon
- Canton: Château-Renault

Government
  - Mayor (2020–2026): Antoine Trystram
- Area^{1}: 35.66 km^{2} (13.77 sq mi)
- Highest elevation: 134 m (440 ft)
- Lowest elevation: 92 m (302 ft)
- Population (2023): 2,200
  - Density: 62/km^{2} (160/sq mi)
- Time zone: UTC+01:00 (CET)
  - Summer (DST): UTC+02:00 (CEST)
- INSEE/Postal code: 37245 /37360
- ^{1} French Land Register data, which excludes lakes, ponds, glaciers > 1 km^{2} (0.386 sq mi or 247 acres) and river estuaries.

Semblançay (French pronunciation: [sɑ̃blɑ̃sɛ]) is a commune in the Indre-et-Loire department in central France.

== Population ==
Historical population

Year	Pop.	±% p.a.
1793	664	—
1800	574	−2.06%
1806	656	+2.25%
1821	750	+0.90%
1831	901	+1.85%
1836	963	+1.34%
1841	1,009	+0.94%
1846	1,063	+1.05%
1851	1,156	+1.69%
1856	1,150	−0.10%
1861	1,164	+0.24%
1866	1,159	−0.09%
1872	1,111	−0.70%
1876	1,103	−0.18%
1881	1,111	+0.14%
1886	1,127	+0.29%
1891	1,106	−0.38%
1896	1,125	+0.34%
1901	1,112	−0.23%

Year	Pop.	±% p.a.
1906	1,079	−0.60%
1911	1,082	+0.06%
1921	962	−1.17%
1926	921	−0.87%
1931	920	−0.02%
1936	852	−1.52%
1946	916	+0.73%
1954	908	−0.11%
1962	929	+0.29%
1968	867	−1.14%
1975	875	+0.13%
1982	1,093	+3.23%
1990	1,489	+3.94%
1999	1,692	+1.43%
2007	2,000	+2.11%
2012	2,112	+1.10%
2017	2,171	+0.55%
2023	2,200	+0.22%

Source: EHESS and INSEE (1968-2023)

== See also ==
- Communes of the Indre-et-Loire department
- Samblanay
