= Joyenval Abbey =

Former French abbey

Coordinates: 48°53′10″N 2°2′10″E

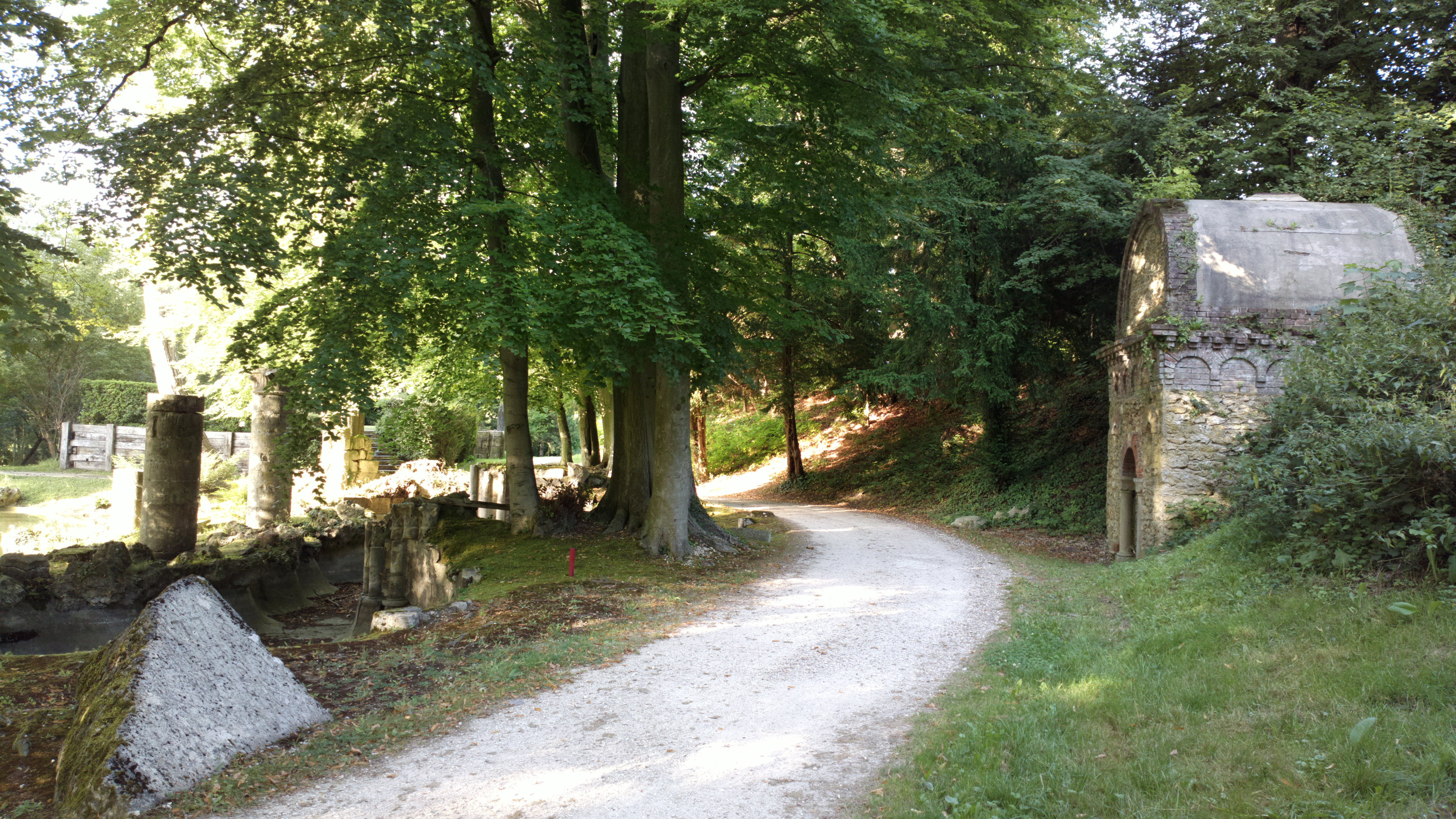
Abbey ruins

Joyenval Abbey (French: Abbaye de Joyenval) was a Premonstratensian monastery located in the Forêt de Marly, in the present commune of Chambourcy, Yvelines, France.

== History ==
The abbey was founded in 1224 by Barthélemy de Roye, chamberlain of King Philippe-Auguste. It was built close to the donjon or fortress of Montjoye, where (as the canons maintained) the oriflamme, the standard given to Charlemagne by Pope Leo III, was anciently preserved, and (according to legend) the location of the Fontaine des Lys, the site of the conversion of Clovis.

The church was initially dedicated to Saint Laurence, and after 1261, when his relics were transferred here, also to Saint Bartholomew.

The abbey was set on fire on 13 August 1346 during the advance of Edward III in the Hundred Years' War.

The canons also owned an hôtel, or town house, in Paris, in a street on the rive droite in the present 1st arrondissement, named after them the Rue aux Moines de Joienval and later, with some corruption, the Rue aux Moines-de-Jenvau or Rue à Moingnes de Jenvau. The building was replaced by a salt warehouse in 1698. The street is now known as the Rue des Orfèvres.

The abbey was destroyed in the 1790s during the French Revolution.

== Remains ==
The only physical remains are a few traces of the abbey church, which can be seen on Joyenval golf course. They were recorded as a monument historique on 24 October 1989.

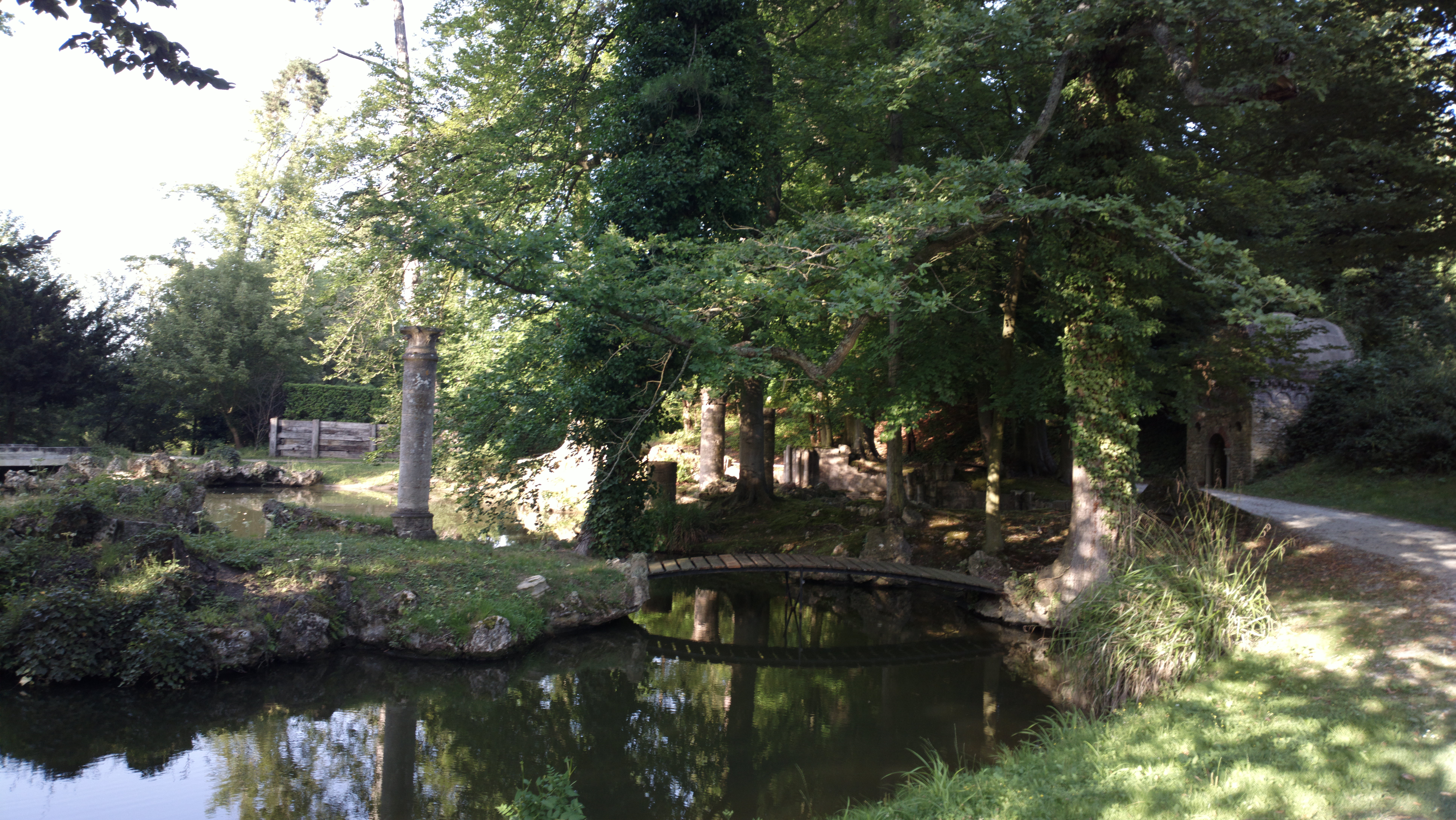

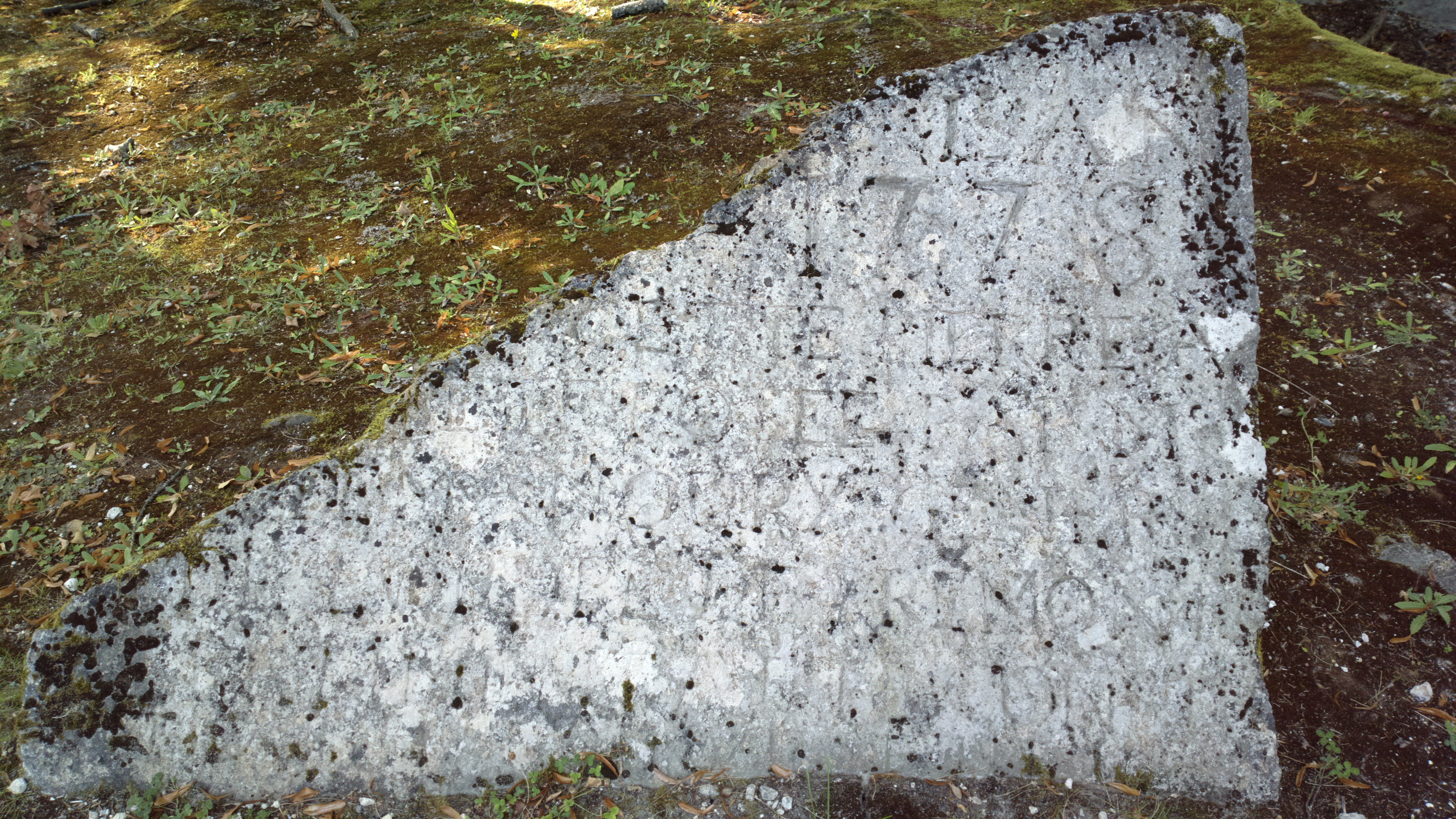

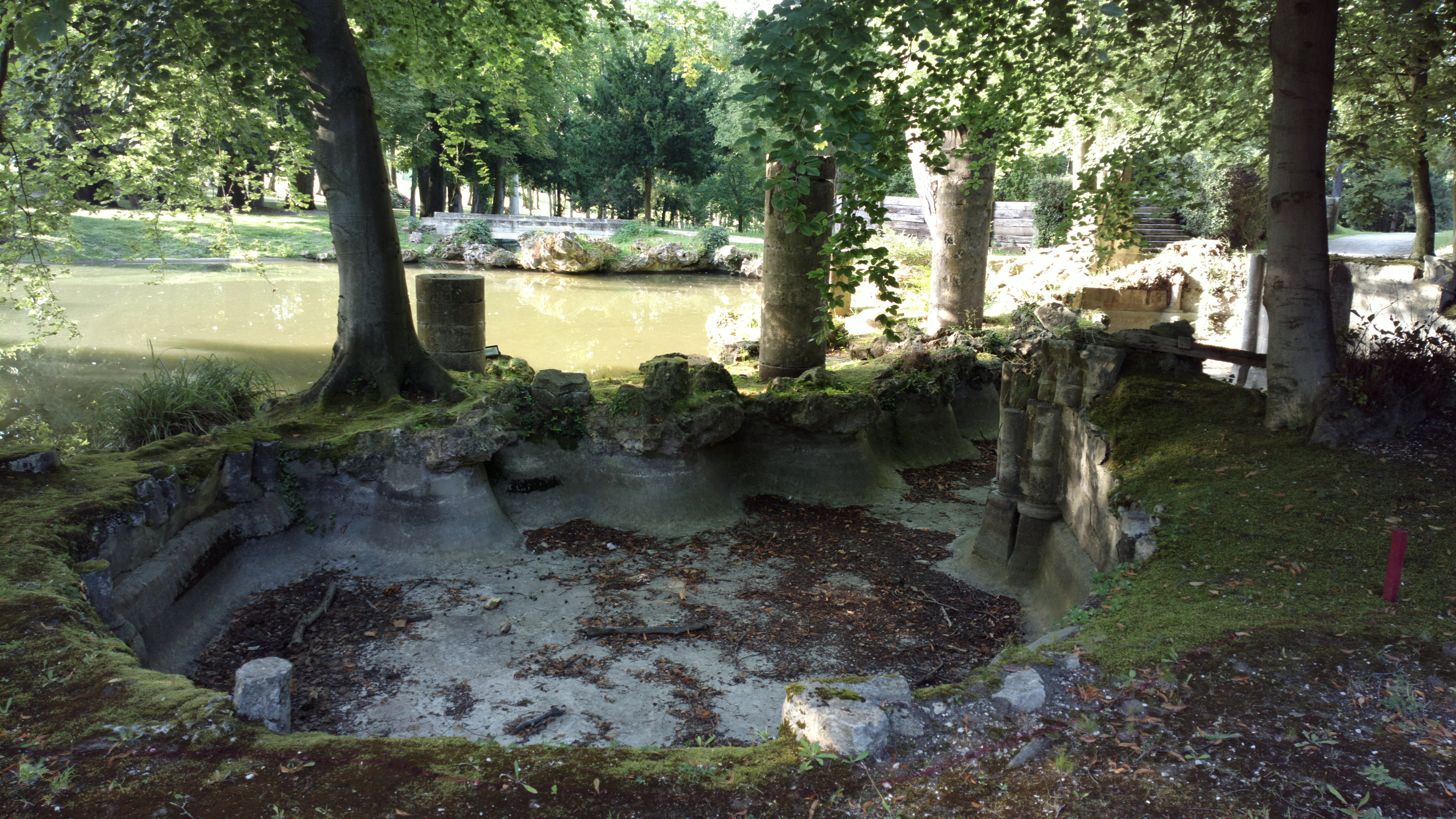

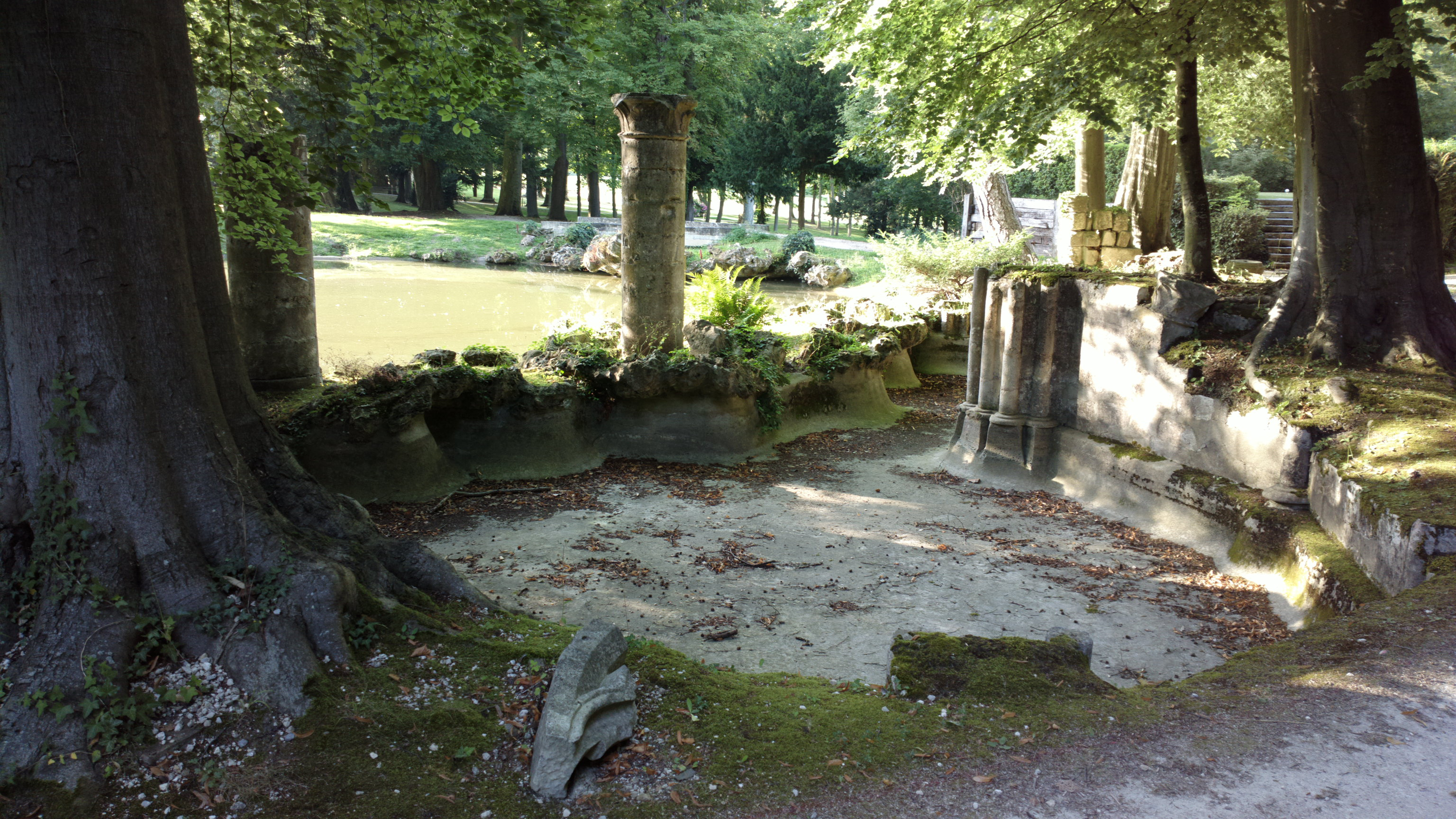
