= Charlotte de Sauve =

French courtesan (1551–1617)

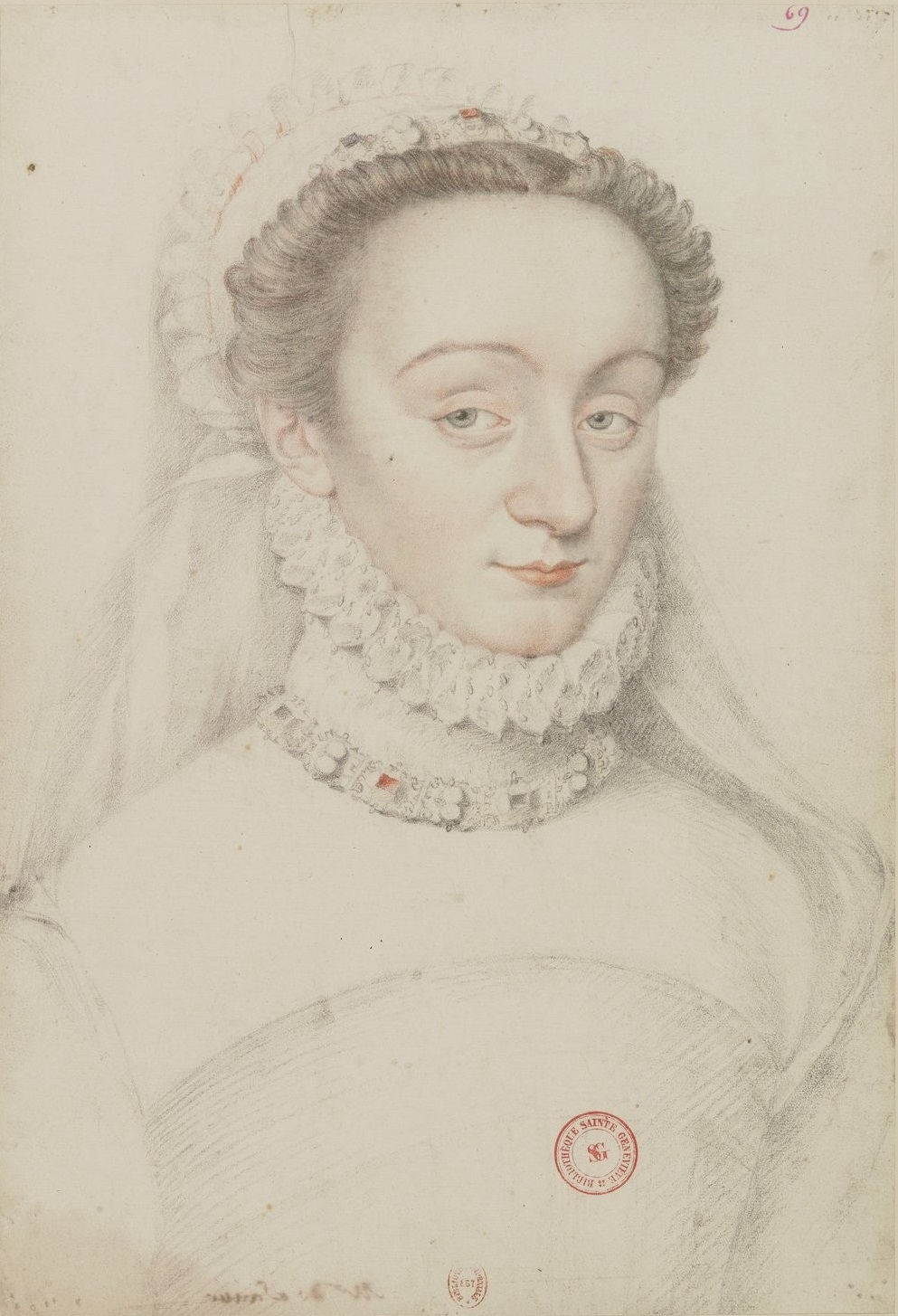
- Portrait of Charlotte de Sauve, by an unknown artist

suo jure Baroness of Semblançay and Viscountess of Tours
- Reign: -30 September 1617
- Predecessor: Jacques de Beaune
- Successor: Louis de La Tremoille
- Full name: Charlotte de Beaune Semblançay
- Known for: Mistress of Henry IV of France, Francis, Duke of Anjou, and Henry I, Duke of Guise; Member of the Flying Squadron
- Born: 26 October 1551; France
- Died: 30 September 1617 (aged 65); France
- Noble family: de Beaune
- Spouses: Simon Fizes, baron de Sauves; Francois de La Tremoille, Marquis de Noirmoutier
- Issue: Louis de La Tremoille
- Father: Jacques de Beaune
- Mother: Gabrielle de Sade

Charlotte de Beaune Semblançay, Viscountess of Tours, Baroness de Sauve, Marquise de Noirmoutier (26 October 1551 – 30 September 1617) was a French noblewoman and a mistress of King Henry of Navarre, who later ruled as King Henry IV of France. She was a member of queen mother Catherine de' Medici's notorious "Flying Squadron" (L'escadron volant in French), a group of beautiful female spies and informants recruited to seduce important men at court, and thereby extract information to pass on to the Queen Mother.

== Biography ==
Charlotte was born in France on 26 October 1551, the daughter and only child of Jacques de Beaune, Baron Semblançay, Viscount of Tours, and Gabrielle de Sade, a descendant of Provençal nobility. The family seat was in the former province of Touraine. Her great-grandfather, Jacques de Beaune, was a superintendent of finance to King Francis I who ordered his execution in 1527 at the instigation of his mother, Louise of Savoy. Charlotte later succeeded her father to the barony of Semblançay and the viscounty of Tours.

Charlotte was sent to court where she was educated in the household of Catherine de' Medici. Blonde-haired, and described as having been "beautiful, intelligent, and immoral", she was married to Simon de Fizes, Baron de Sauve, secretary of state first to King Charles IX and afterwards King Henry III, in 1569 when she was eighteen years old. Her marriage was arranged by the powerful Guise family. In the words of historian Jean Heritier, her background meant that "at twenty-one, she knew all there was to be known about politics".

She was appointed maid-of-honour to Marguerite de Valois. She is recorded as taking part in some of the extravagant pageants and ballets which Catherine de' Medici produced in abundance. She helped Catherine mount an outdoor banquet and lavish show depicting the Apotheosis of Woman on 9 June 1577 at the château of Chenonceau. During the banquet the male guests were served by Catherine's most beautiful ladies-in-waiting who wore topless gowns and their hair flowing loose as was the custom of brides on their wedding night.

On 27 November 1579 her husband died. Charlotte married secondly on 18 October 1584, Francois de La Tremoille, Marquis de Noirmoutier and gave birth to a son, Louis de La Tremoille in 1586. In 1608, Louis would succeed his father as Marquis de Noirmoutier. On 13 March 1610, he married Lucrèce Bouhier, by whom he had a son, Louis de La Tremoille, 1st Duke of Noirmoutier (25 December 1612 – 12 October 1666). A notable descendant of Charlotte was Marie-Anne de la Trémoille, Princesse des Ursins.

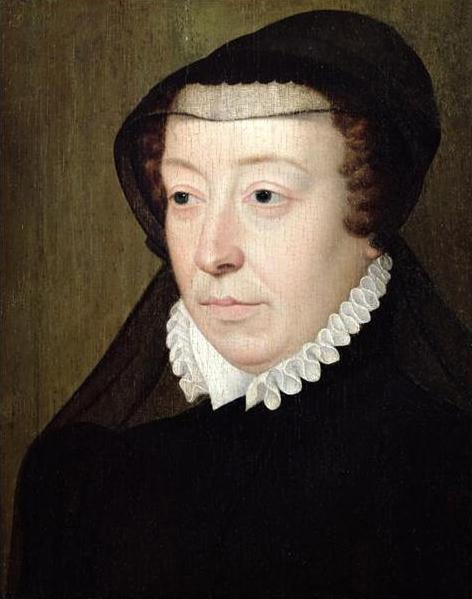
Catherine de' Medici formed the notorious group of female informants known as the "Flying Squadron", of which Charlotte de Sauve was a member

== Flying Squadron ==
Shortly after Henry of Navarre's marriage to Catherine's daughter Marguerite de Valois in 1572, Catherine recruited Charlotte to her elite group of beautiful female spies and informants known as the "Flying Squadron" (L'escadron volant) and she quickly became one of its "most accomplished members". The Queen Mother's purpose in inviting Charlotte to join the group was for the latter to seduce Navarre, become his confidante as well as mistress, and thus extract information which she would duly pass on to Catherine who would subsequently use it as political leverage. The "Flying Squadron" had a male counterpart in "Les Mignons". Charlotte quickly became Navarre's mistress and exerted a strong influence over him. His wife Marguerite recorded in her memoirs: "Mme de Sauve so completely ensnared my husband that we no longer slept together, not even conversed". She accused de Sauve ("that Circe") of persuading Henry that she was jealous of de Sauve, with the result that Henry, whose affairs Marguerite had allowed, stopped confiding in her.

Charlotte de Sauve has been credited as a source of the information that led to the execution of Marguerite de Valois's lover Joseph Boniface de La Môle and Annibal de Coconnas for engaging in a conspiracy to overthrow the gravely ill Charles IX and the Queen Mother in 1574 with the assistance of Huguenot troops. In 1575, Catherine de' Medici, abetted by her son Henry III, instructed Charlotte to seduce the king's brother, her youngest son, François, Duke of Alençon, with the aim of provoking hostility between the two young men, so that they would not conspire together in the future. Charlotte subsequently became the duke's mistress, creating a rift between the former close friends, as Navarre and Alençon became rivals over Charlotte. According to Marguerite's memoirs: "Charlotte de Sauve treated both of them [Navarre and Alençon] in such a way that they became extremely jealous of each other, to such a point that they forgot their ambitions, their duties and their plans and thought of nothing but chasing after this woman". Henry of Navarre wrote to a friend: "The court is the strangest I have ever known. We are nearly always ready to cut each other's throat ... All the band you know wants my death on account of my love for Monsieur [Alençon] and they have forbidden for the third time my mistress [Charlotte de Sauve] to speak to me. They have such a hold on her that she does not dare look at me. I am waiting for a minor battle, for they say they will kill me, and I want to be one jump ahead of them". On one occasion, Henry III had Alençon's papers searched for evidence of political plotting but turned up only a declaration of love from Madame de Sauve.

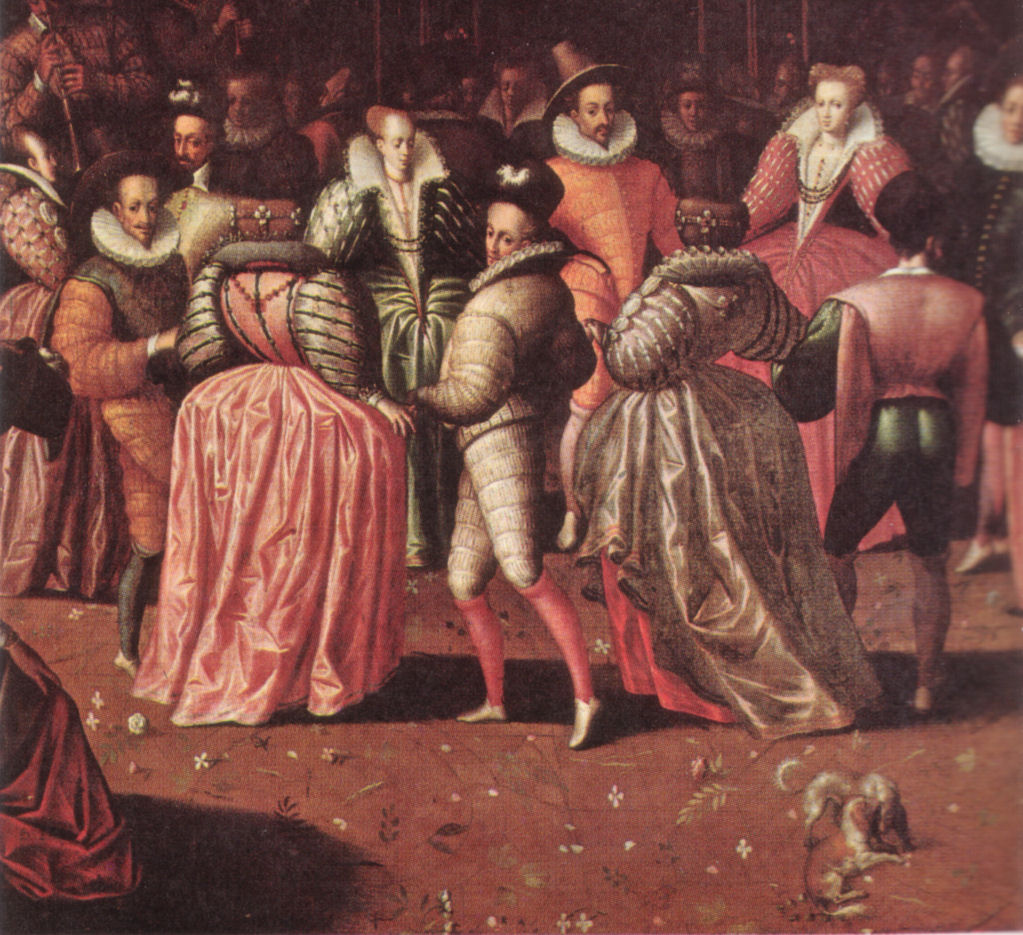
Ball at the court of Henry III, c. 1582

In the autumn of 1578, she was recorded as having been one of the three hundred members of the court which accompanied Catherine and Marguerite on a royal progress to the Kingdom of Navarre where the latter was reunited with her husband who had returned to his kingdom two years earlier. However, instead of resuming his love affair with Charlotte, Navarre's interest was caught by Victoria de Ayala, a beautiful Spanish girl and a recent recruit to the "Flying Squadron".

Charlotte de Sauve later became the mistress of Navarre's greatest adversary, Henry I, Duke of Guise, with whom she spent the night at Blois on 22 December 1588, before his assassination by "the Forty-five", Henry III's bodyguards, the following morning. She had other lovers, including the Duc d'Épernon and the Seigneur d'Avrilly.

== Later years and death ==
She appears again in 1599 when she was called upon as a witness in the annulment proceedings of Henry of Navarre (who had succeeded to the French throne as Henry IV in 1589) and Marguerite, who had proved to be sterile. Henry wished to annul his marriage in order to marry Marie de' Medici and sire an heir. Charlotte testified that Marguerite had been forced to marry Henry by Charles IX and the Queen Mother, swearing that Catherine had threatened Marguerite that "if she did not consent to this marriage, she would make her the most miserable woman in the kingdom". The annulment was granted on 17 December 1599 leaving King Henry free to wed Marie de' Medici by whom he had six legitimate royal offspring, including his heir Louis.

Charlotte died on 30 September 1617 at age 65.

== In film ==
The role of Charlotte de Sauve was played by Italian actress Asia Argento in the 1994 film La Reine Margot starring Isabelle Adjani in the title role. In the film the character dies while unknowingly trying to poison Henry of Navarre.

Charlotte is also portrayed in season one episode seventeen of The CW's television show Reign by actress Amy Groening.

== See also ==
- Henry IV of France's wives and mistresses
