= Florimond II Robertet, seigneur de Fresne =

Florimond II Robertet de Fresne (1531–1567) was a Secretary of State to French kings Francis II and Charles IX. He served in that role from the age of 26 until his death ten years later.

Robertet was born into a family that was supported by the House of Guise. His father, Francis Robertet, served as secretary to Peter II, who, with his wife, Anne of France, ruled the kingdom during the minority of her brother, Charles VIII.

Political offices
Preceded by Côme Clausse	Minister of Foreign Affairs; 22 October 1559–1567	Succeeded by Simon Fizes, baron de Sauves
