= Jacques de Beaune =

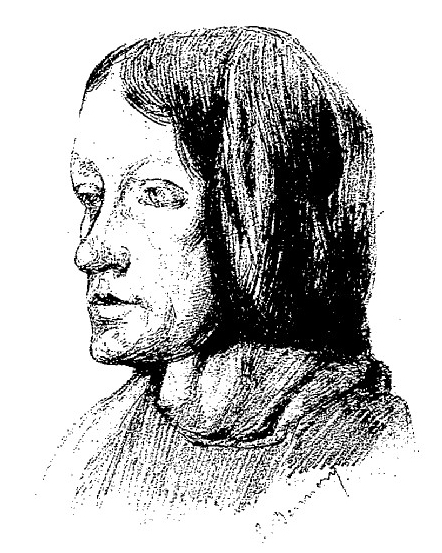

Jacques de Beaune, baron de Semblançay (c.1445/1465 (Note: The University of Tours states "born around 1455" : Jacques de Beaune ; the Encyclopédie Larousse states "born around 1445" : Jacques de Beaune) - 12 August 1527) was a French politician, serving as an officer of Francis I of France and considered to be the first surintendant des finances of the kingdom of France.

He married Jeanne Ruzé, daughter of mayor Jean Ruzé and Guillonne Berthelot.

== In popular culture ==
Le Carroi de Beaune, an interactive comic on his life, was published online on 25 October 2022 by Loïc Chevalier, Ullcer and Greg Lofé.

== Bibliography (in French) ==
- Philippe Hamon, « Semblançay, homme de finances et de Conseil (v. 1455-1527) », in Cédric Michon (ed.), Les conseillers de François Ier, Rennes, Presses universitaires de Rennes, coll. « Histoire. L'univers de la cour », 2011, 668 p. (ISBN 978-2-7535-1313-6, p. 117-130.
- Alfred Spont, Semblançay (?-1527) : la bourgeoisie financière au début du 16th century, Hachette, Paris, 1895, online.
- Clément-Simon, « Jean de Selve, Premier Président du Parlement de Paris », Revue des questions historiques, 1898.

== External links (in French) ==
- Biography on the Comité pour l'histoire économique et financière de la France site
- Beaune, Jacques de, Partours - Université de Tours
